= Anaerobic =

Anaerobic means "living, active, occurring, or existing in the absence of free oxygen", as opposed to aerobic which means "living, active, or occurring only in the presence of oxygen." Anaerobic may also refer to:

- Anaerobic adhesive, a bonding agent that does not cure in the presence of air
- Anaerobic respiration, respiration in the absence of oxygen, using some other molecule as the final electron acceptor
  - Anaerobic organism, any organism whose redox metabolism does not depend on free oxygen
  - Anammox, anaerobic ammonium oxidation, a globally important microbial process of the nitrogen cycle
  - Anaerobic filter, an anaerobic digester with a tank containing a filter medium where anaerobic microbes can establish themselves
  - Anaerobic digestion, the use of anaerobic bacteria to break down waste, with biogas as a byproduct
    - Anaerobic clarigester, an anaerobic digester that treats dilute biodegradable feedstocks and allows different retention times for solids and liquids
    - Anaerobic contact process, an anaerobic digester with a set of reactors in series
- Hypoxia (environmental) (anaerobic environment), an environment with little or no available oxygen
- Anaerobic lagoon, used to dispose of animal waste, particularly that of cows and pigs
- Anaerobic exercise, exercise intense enough to cause lactate to form, used in non-endurance sports

== See also ==
- Aerobic (disambiguation)
- Oxygen-free (disambiguation)
