= Internal circulation reactor =

The internal circulation reactor (IC reactor) is a form of anaerobic digester. It is primarily designed to treat wastewater. The IC reactor is an evolution of the UASB and EGSB digestion systems. The IC reactor is essentially two vertical UASB reactors in series, providing a larger height-to-diameter ratio, and decreasing footprint. The main feature of an IC reactor is its gas-driven internal circulation system, which retains biomass within the column until digestion, instead of having an external vessel for re-circulation. Because of this retention, ICs typically produce biogas with a high concentration of methane (~80%), and can process waste 3-5 times faster than typical UASB reactors.

The IC reactor typically comes as part of a series of anaerobic digestion system where it is preceded by thermal hydrolysis, acidogenesis, and acetogenesis, with high methanogenic activity in the IC reactor being an indicator of its efficiency. Effluent leaving the IC reactor may require further aerobic treatment to reduce biochemical (BOD) and chemical oxygen demand (COD) to levels consistent with local legislation.

== See also ==
- Anaerobic digester types
