= Anaerofilum =

Scientific classification
- Domain: Bacteria
- Kingdom: Bacillati
- Phylum: Bacillota
- Class: Clostridia
- Order: Eubacteriales
- Family: Oscillospiraceae
- Genus: Anaerofilum; Zellner et al. 1996

Type species
- Anaerofilum pentosovorans Zellner et al. 1996

Species
- A. agile; "Ca. A. excrementigallinarum"; "Ca. A. faecale"; A. hominis; A. pentosovorans

Genus of bacteria

Acutalibacter is a Gram-positive, strictly anaerobic, chemoorganotrophic, mesophilic and acidogenic genus of bacteria from the family of Oscillospiraceae.

== Phylogeny ==
The currently accepted taxonomy is based on the List of Prokaryotic names with Standing in Nomenclature (LPSN) and National Center for Biotechnology Information (NCBI)

16S rRNA based LTP_10_2024

- Anaerofilum
  - A. hominis Liu et al. 2022
  - - A. agile Zellner et al. 1996
    - A. pentosovorans Zellner et al. 1996

120 marker proteins based GTDB 09-RS220

- Anaerofilum
  - "Ca. A. excrementigallinarum" Gilroy et al. 2021
  - "Ca. A. faecale" Gilroy et al. 2021

== See also ==
- List of bacterial orders
- List of bacteria genera
