= Anoxia =

Anoxia means a total depletion in the level of oxygen, an extreme form of hypoxia or "low oxygen". The terms anoxia and hypoxia are used in various contexts:

- Anoxic waters, sea water, fresh water or groundwater that are depleted of dissolved oxygen
- Anoxic event, when the Earth's oceans become completely depleted of oxygen below the surface levels
- Euxinic, anoxic conditions in the presence of hydrogen sulfide
- Hypoxia (environmental), low oxygen conditions
- Hypoxia (medicine), when the body or a region of the body is deprived of adequate oxygen supply
  - Cerebral anoxia, when the brain is completely deprived of oxygen, an extreme form of cerebral hypoxia

== See also ==
- Anoxia (beetle), a genus of scarab beetles
- Oxygen saturation, a relative measure of the oxygen dissolved or carried in a medium; a measure of the severity of hypoxic conditions
- Oxygen toxicity (hyperoxia), the opposite condition of hypoxia, an excess of oxygen in body tissues
- Oxygen-free (disambiguation)
