= Anaerobic clarigester =

The anaerobic clarigester is a form of anaerobic digester. It is regarded as being the ancestor of the upflow anaerobic sludge blanket digestion (UASB) anaerobic digester. A clarigester treats dilute biodegradable feedstocks and separates out solid and hydraulic (liquid) retention times. A diagram comparing the UASB, anaerobic clarigester and anaerobic contact processes can be found on the FAO website.

== See also ==
- Anaerobic digestion
- Anaerobic digester types
- Biogas
- Expanded granular sludge bed digestion
- List of wastewater treatment technologies
- Upflow anaerobic sludge blanket digestion
