= Fire copper distillation =

Fire copper distillation is a process used in the distilling industry that uses a pot still and a direct flame to heat the wort. The term is most often used in the production of sour mash whiskey but has also been used for rum.

== History ==
The term "fire copper" originated from the "brewing copper" or "wort copper" kettles used for brewing. Before the 19th century most distillation was performed from a simple pot still developed in 800 AD by the Arab alchemist Jabir ibn Hayyan. In the early 19th century the advent of steam heating and later the continuous "patent" still radically transformed the spirits industry. Smaller traditional producers developed marketing strategies to differentiate industrial, mass-produced spirits from batch distilled traditional spirits. The terms "fire copper", "pure fire copper" and "fire copper distilled" became common after 1850. In the years leading up to prohibition many smaller spirits producers disappeared. After prohibition the term was seldom used.
