= Digeponics =

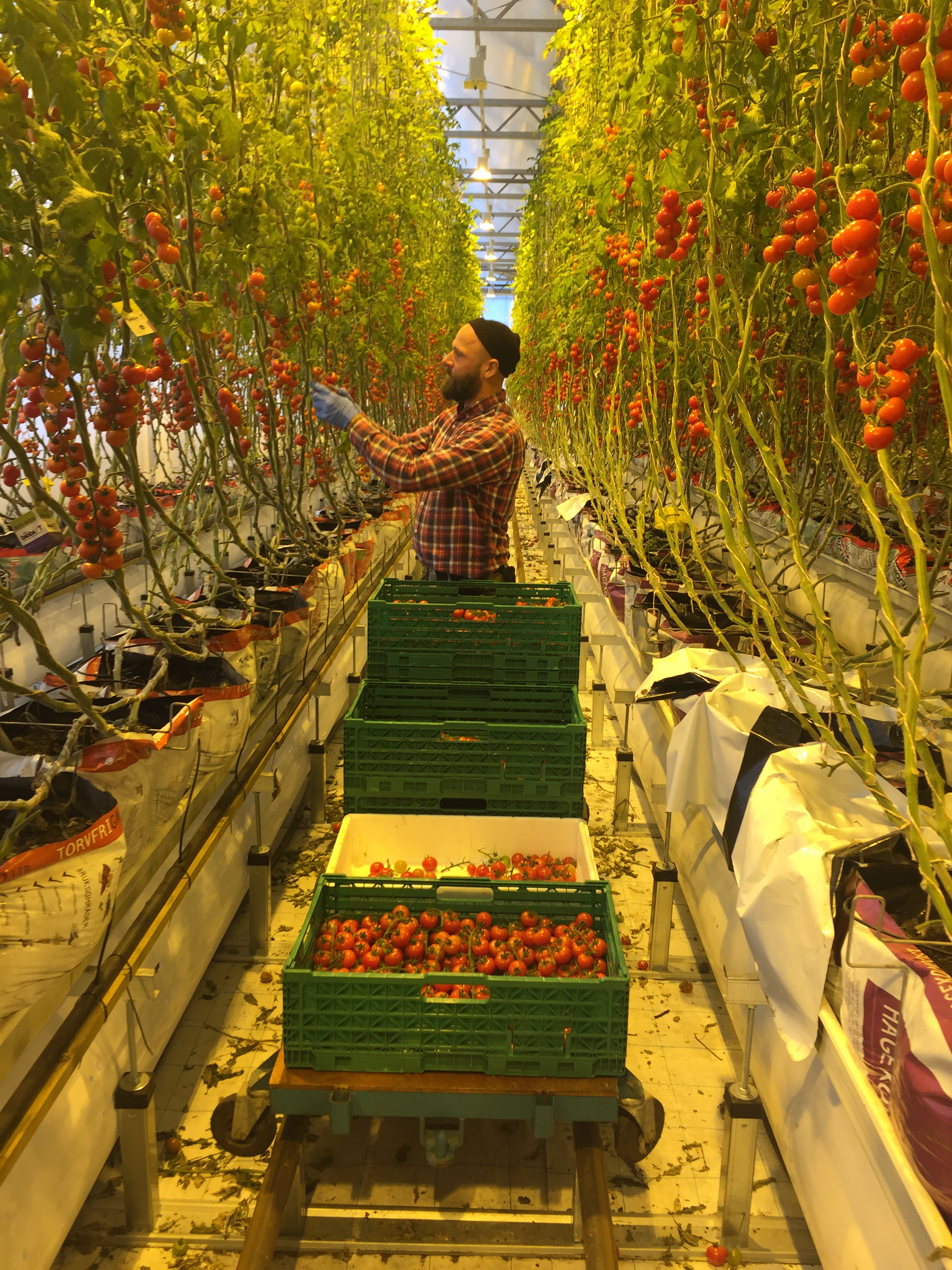

Digeponics (pronounced die-jeh-ponics, as in digestion) is a method of agriculture which integrates the products of anaerobic digestion, including CO_{2} and digestate, with greenhouse cultivation of vegetables.

== Background ==
Digeponics was developed in Norway by the "Food to Waste to Food" (F2W2F) program, a part of the EU Eco-innovation Initiative, in partnership with the waste management company Lindum AS.

== Overall concept ==
The method involves the use of various products of anaerobic digestion in the cultivation of vegetables in a greenhouse environment. The more widely used aspects include the use of biogas for electricity production, which is used for lighting and heating the greenhouse in the winter months, as well as the introduction of carbon dioxide into the greenhouse, which is a byproduct of biogas combustion, for increased plant growth. The more novel aspect of this method is the use of a "mix of vermicompost and garden waste compost fertilized by (non-separated) digestate in a circulating system including earth worms in the substrate and aeration in a biofilter buffer tank."

== Performance ==
Research conducted on digeponics found that this method, and others like it, could meet or exceed the production rates of mineral fertilizers. For tomato production, digeponics yielded 5430 g, compared to 4920 g for mineral fertilizers. For cucumber production, digeponics yielded 19560g, compared to 8502g for mineral fertilizers.

In addition to increased yields, this method can provide decreased energy costs and very low carbon emissions, by producing energy on site from renewable carbon neutral sources that are readily available to the farmer, and could even provide an additional source of income by charging tipping fees for organic waste collection and selling excess electricity or gas back into the grid. Methane emissions were shown to be reduced by 98%, compared to landfilling of organic waste, and carbon emissions were reduced 95%, compared with conventional tomato greenhouse production.

== See also ==
- Controlled-environment agriculture
- Hydroponics
- Aquaponics
