= Avonmouth explosion =

2020 Explosion in Bristol, England

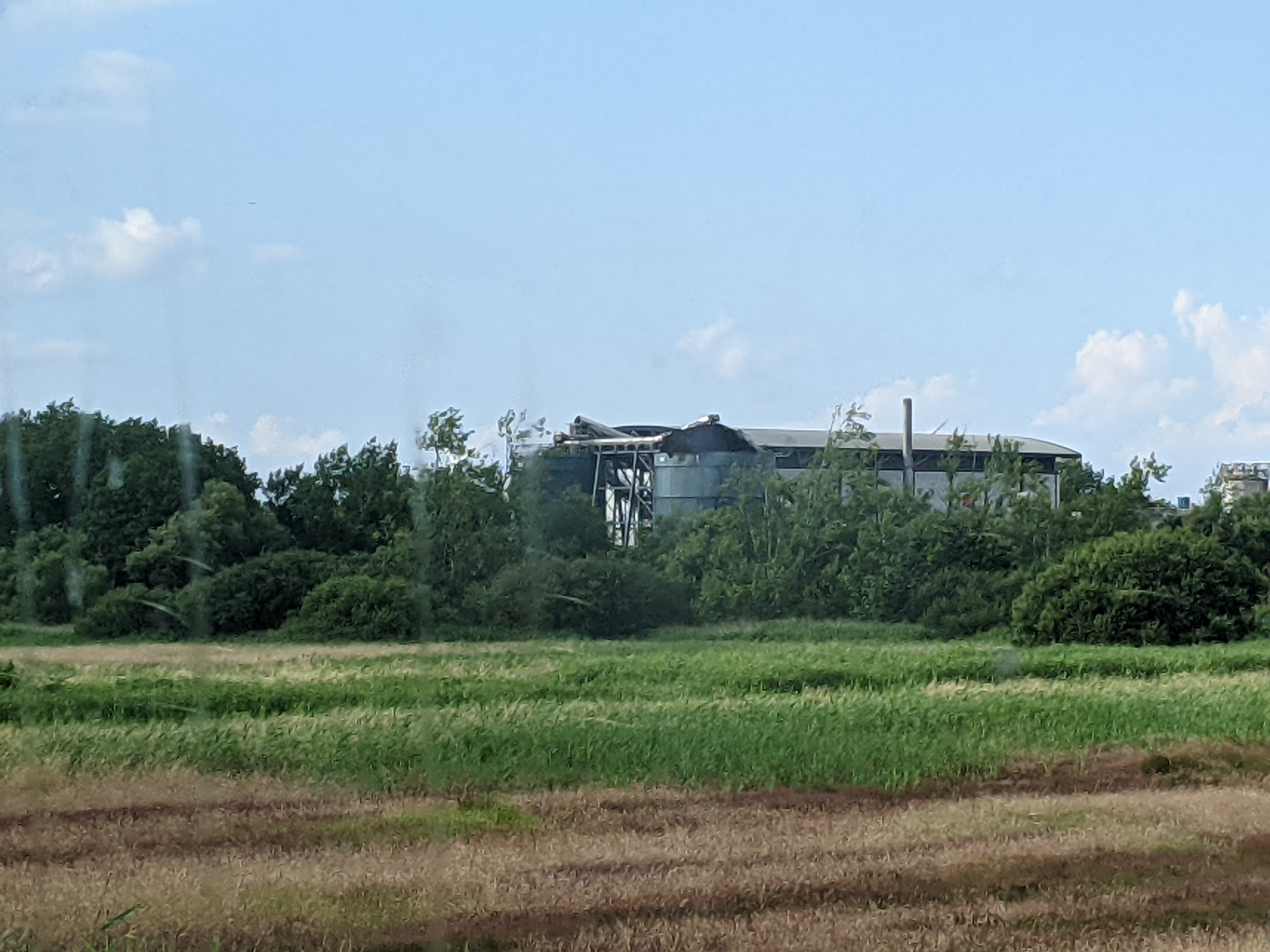
- The silo that exploded, as seen from Kings Weston Lane
- Date: 3 December 2020
- Time: 11:20 GMT
- Venue: Bristol Bioresources and Renewable Energy Park
- Location: Avonmouth, Bristol, United Kingdom; 51.51264°N 2.67641°W
- Deaths: 4
- Injuries: 1

On 3 December 2020, at about 11:20 GMT, a silo containing biosolids exploded in Avonmouth, Bristol, UK, killing four men, including a 16-year old apprentice, and injuring another person. Avon and Somerset Police declared a major incident, the Hazardous Area Response Team from Bristol and a doctor and specialist paramedic in critical care from the nearby Great Western Air Ambulance headquarters attended the incident by both their rapid response car and emergency helicopter.

The sewage treatment and food waste site is operated by GENeco, a subsidiary of Wessex Water. Its products include biomethane produced by anaerobic digestion, which is supplied to bus operators, among them Bristol Community Transport who operate one of the MetroBus routes.

Unconfirmed evidence obtained by The Bristol Cable suggests the men were using angle grinders on the top of a silo where methane could have accumulated, without adequate controls to prevent ignition.

An investigation by the police was closed in July 2024 due to "insufficient evidence" for a manslaughter conviction. The Health and Safety Executive continued investigation to determine if criminal offences had been committed. This resulted in a hearing at Bristol magistrates' court in November 2026, where Wessex Water pleaded guilty to three charges under the Health and Safety at Work Act. Afterwards, a HSE inspector said the HSE had found that Wessex Water had made "clear, identifiable failures that could too reasonably have been prevented". The case was referred to Bristol Crown Court for a hearing on 8 January 2027.
