= Karl Imhoff =

German civil engineer and author

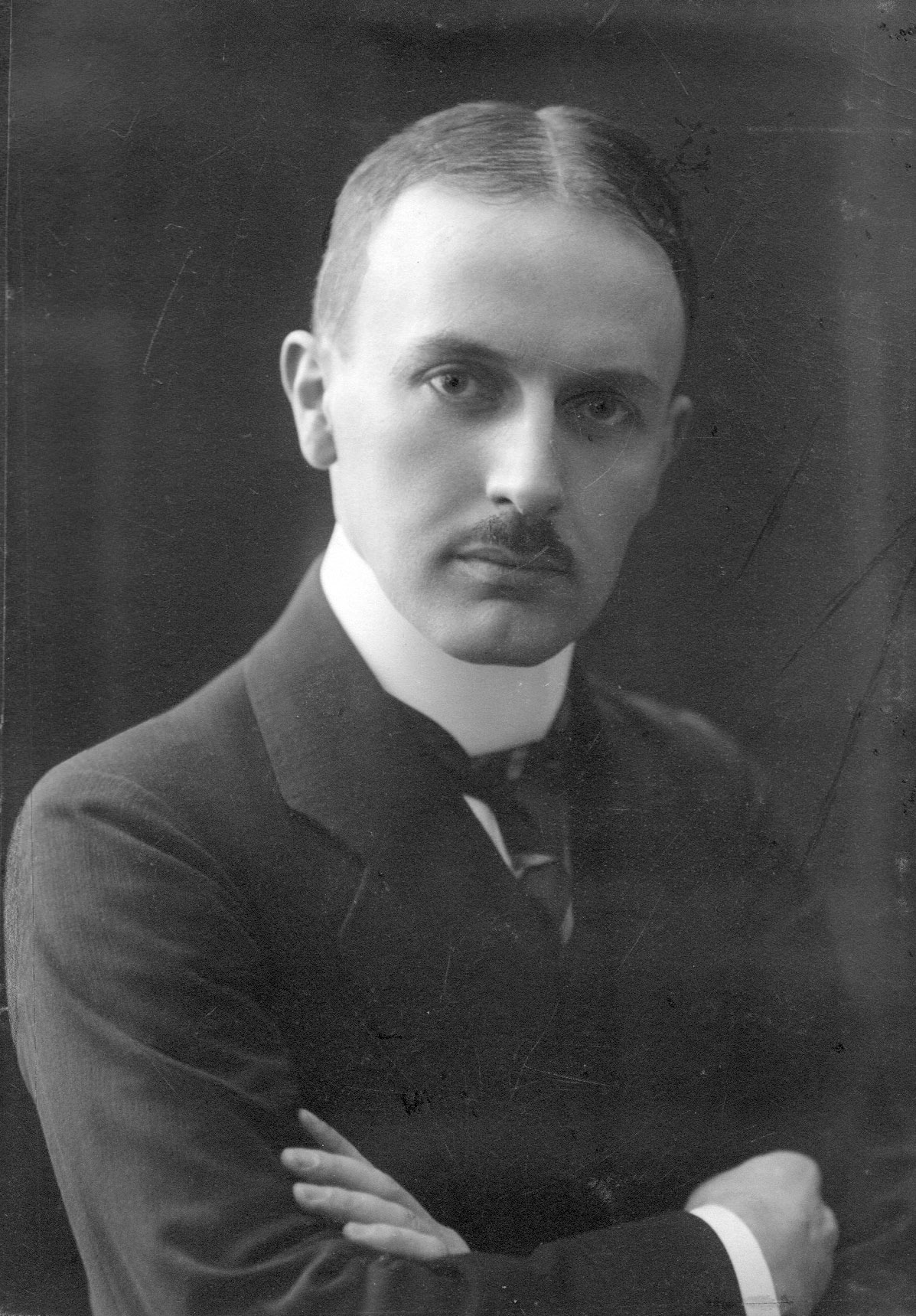
- Born: April 7, 1876; Mannheim, Prussia, German Empire
- Died: September 28, 1965 (aged 89); Essen, West Germany
- Engineering career
- Discipline: Civil engineering

Karl Imhoff (7 April 1876 in Mannheim – 28 September 1965) was a German civil engineer, author, and a pioneer of wastewater treatment used throughout the world.

== Action ==
Karl Imhoff was the driving force in the development and invention of the technical apparatuses and methods of sewage treatment (the trickling - and activated sludge process). Imhoff provided not only significant technical innovations, but also design rules derived from experience in the operation of sewage treatment plants. He wrote a book Handbook of Urban Drainage in 1906, which today is released in new editions. In its 100-year history, the book has been translated 40 times. It has appeared in a total of 20 languages.

From 1906 Imhoff was the Emscher Society served as head of the Office wastewater. 1907, where he developed the Emscher fountain with an anaerobic sludge treatment.

From 1922 to 1934, Imhoff was managing director of the Ruhrverband, where he planned five Ruhr dams, until he was replaced by the Nazis. On May 10, 1948 on his initiative and to the Director of the Ruhr Association, Max Prüss, the Wastewater Technical Association. Founded eV (ATV) in Düsseldorf Imhoff was at that time in Germany, the largest capacity for wastewater treatment.

== Honours ==
Imhoff was awarded honorary degrees by the Institutes of Technology in Karlsruhe, Stuttgart and Aachen and, in 1953, the Great Cross of Merit of the Federal Republic of Germany and in 1959 the "Bunsen Pettenkofer honor roll". This is awarded to individuals who have made in an excellent way to promote water and wastewater management in scientific or practical way by the Deutscher Verein des Gas- und Wasserfaches.

The 10,000 euro Karl Imhoff Award was donated to the recognition of the great merits of his wastewater management and as a permanent reminder of his work. He is of the DWA - awarded German Association for Water, Wastewater and Waste, for the Promotion of scientific work in the field of waste water system for outstanding research, dissertations or examination papers.

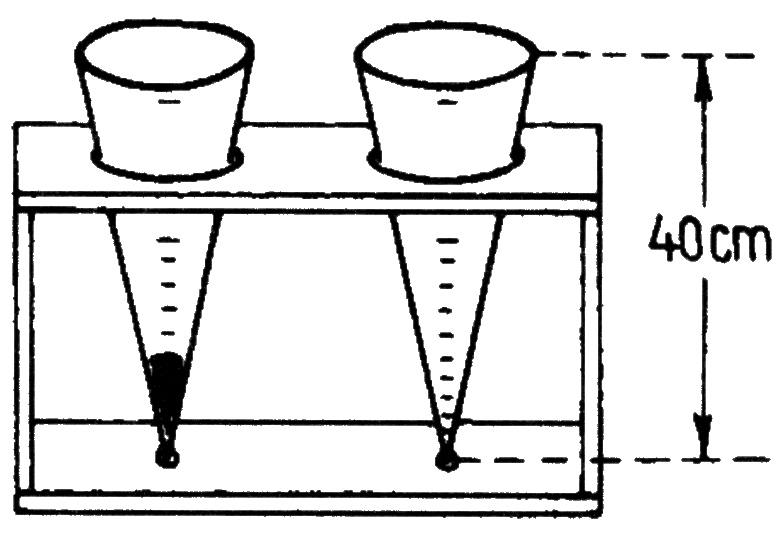
Imhoff cone to determine the amount of settleable solids in the wastewater

Imhoff tank, which are used for treatment of waste water, and the Imhoff cone for determining settleable matter.

Streets in five German cities (Hannover, Langenhagen, Mannheim, Schleswig and Straubing) were named after him.

== Journals (selection) ==
- Handbook of Urban Drainage. R. Oldenbourg Verlag, Munich 1906.
  - 30th Edition (the 100th anniversary of the first edition), Oldenbourg industry Verlag, Munich 2006, ISBN 3-8356-3094-6.
  - English edition: Karl Imhoff's Handbook of Urban Drainage and Wastewater Disposal. Wiley, New York 1989, ISBN 0-471-81037-1..
- (With G. M. Fair): Sewage treatment. John Wiley & Sons, New York, 1949.
- (With W. J. Müller, D. K. B. Thistlethwayte): Disposal of Sewage and other Water-borne Wastes. 2nd Edn., Butterworths, London, 1971.

== Literature ==
- William Husmann (1974). "Imhoff, Karl". Neue Deutsche Biographie (in German). Vol. 10. Berlin: Duncker & Humblot. pp. 153–154.
- Herbert Ricken: Memory of Karl Imhoff (1876-1965) In. Construction technology, 78 Class of 2001, No. 5 (May 2001), p #.
- Hans-Erhard Lessing: pioneers Mannheimer Wellhöfer-Verlag, Mannheim 2007th.
