= Comparison of anaerobic and aerobic digestion =

Anaerobic & aerobic system comparison
Anaerobic digestion	Composting
Digestate	Compost
Carbon dioxide	Carbon dioxide
Methane	Heat
Hydrogen sulfide (trace levels)	

The following article is a comparison of aerobic and anaerobic digestion. In both aerobic and anaerobic systems the growing and reproducing microorganisms within them require a source of elemental oxygen to survive.

In an anaerobic system there is an absence of gaseous oxygen. In an anaerobic digester, gaseous oxygen is prevented from entering the system through physical containment in sealed tanks. Anaerobes access oxygen from sources other than the surrounding air. The oxygen source for these microorganisms can be the organic material itself or alternatively may be supplied by inorganic oxides from within the input material. When the oxygen source in an anaerobic system is derived from the organic material itself, then the 'intermediate' end products are primarily alcohols, aldehydes, and organic acids plus carbon dioxide. In the presence of specialised methanogens, the intermediates are converted to the 'final' end products of methane, carbon dioxide with trace levels of hydrogen sulfide. In an anaerobic system the majority of the chemical energy contained within the starting material is released by methanogenic bacteria as methane.

In an aerobic system, such as composting, the microorganisms access free, gaseous oxygen directly from the surrounding atmosphere. The end products of an aerobic process are primarily carbon dioxide and water which are the stable, oxidised forms of carbon and hydrogen. If the biodegradable starting material contains nitrogen, phosphorus and sulfur, then the end products may also include their oxidised forms- nitrate, phosphate and sulfate. In an aerobic system the majority of the energy in the starting material is released as heat by their oxidisation into carbon dioxide and water.

Composting systems typically include organisms such as fungi that are able to break down lignin and celluloses to a greater extent than anaerobic bacteria. Due to this fact it is possible, following anaerobic digestion, to compost the anaerobic digestate allowing further volume reduction and stabilisation.
