= Anaerofilum pentosovorans =

Scientific classification
- Domain: Bacteria
- Kingdom: Bacillati
- Phylum: Bacillota
- Class: Clostridia
- Order: Eubacteriales
- Family: Oscillospiraceae
- Genus: Anaerofilum
- Species: A. pentosovorans

Binomial name
- Anaerofilum pentosovorans Zellner et al. 1996

Type strain
- DSM 7168, strain Fae

Species of bacterium

Anaerofilum pentosovorans is a Gram-positive strictly anaerobic, mesophilic and acidogenic bacterium from the genus Anaerofilum which has been isolated from sludge from a bioreactor from Frankfurt in Germany.
