= Dunder =

Liquid left after distilling rum

Dunder is the liquid left in a boiler after distilling a batch of rum. It is a traditional flavor source used in the fermentation of the wash of Jamaican rum. Similar in process to sour mash in Bourbon whiskey, it is a crucial step in achieving an authentic rum flavor. In Europe, waste liquors from alcohol distillation are referred to as vinasse.

Dunder contains many by-products that help in future fermentations, including dead yeast cells, which are an excellent yeast nutrient. Subsequent fermentations using dunder must be carefully controlled to prevent stress on the yeast which will cause a greater amount of mutations. Also if planning to store dunder before use it is advised to refrigerate the dunder to suppress cell division as to prevent mutations. These mutations change flavor, alcohol content, and overall affect consistency of the finished product. Dunder, if not used to re-pitch the yeast colony, can also be applied as fertilizer.

Traditionally, 20% to 35% of a new wash is dunder from one or more previous washes. This lowers pH, conserves liquid, provides yeast nutrient, and concentrates critical flavoring esters ("rum oils") such as ethyl formate or propyl isobutyrate to ensure good rum flavor. Also traditionally, after a run, the spent liquid from the still (dunder) was tossed in "the dunder pit", where it would settle, and where bacterial action would develop the rum oils. It was then removed to make wash as needed.
