= Digestate =

Material remaining after the anaerobic digestion of a biodegradable feedstock

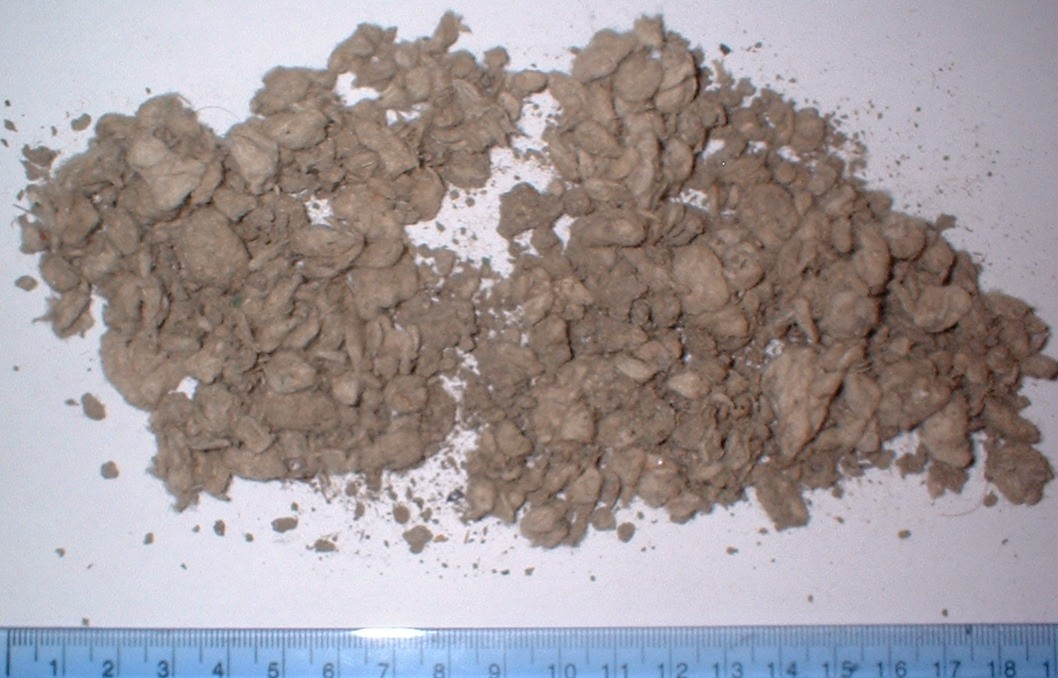
Acidogenic digestate produced from mixed municipal waste

Digestate is the material remaining after the anaerobic digestion (decomposition under low oxygen conditions) of a biodegradable feedstock. Anaerobic digestion produces two main products: digestate and biogas. Digestate is produced both by acidogenesis and methanogenesis and each has different characteristics. These characteristics stem from the original feedstock source as well as the processes themselves.

== Digestate feedstock sources ==
Anaerobic digestion is a versatile process that can use many different types of feedstocks. Example of feedstocks can be from:

- Sewage sludges: Liquid sludge, untreated sewage sludge, composted sludge, and lime treated sludge.
- Animal wastes: Animal fats, animal blood, food remains, stomach contents, rumen contents, animal carcasses, and poultry, fish, and livestock manure.
- Energy crops: Usually corn, maize, millet, and clover. This can be whole crops used in co-digestion or as waste (stems and stalks) from harvesting of these crops.
- Municipal wastes: Food waste, coffee/tea filters, organic leftovers, bakery waste, and kitchen waste.
- Agricultural wastes: Fruits, molasses, stems, plant straw, and bagasse (residue after crushing sugarcane or sorghum stalks).
- Industrial wastes: Food/beverage processing waste, dairy wastes, starch/sugar industries wastes, slaughterhouse wastes, and brewery wastes.

These are just some of the different sources that anaerobic digestate can come from. The chemical make-up of the digestate produced can vary depending on what feedstock is used. Sewage sludge and animal manure generally have the majority of its energy contents consumed due to the original energy source (food) being digested inside the person or animal first. This allows sewage sludge and animal manure to be good candidates for co-digestion together with other feedstocks to produce a better digestate for agricultural purposes as well as increased biogas production.

== Acidogenic digestate ==
During this stage, the acidifying bacteria convert water-soluble chemical substances, including products of hydrolysis, to short-chain organic acids, such as formic, acetic, propionic, butyric, and pentanoic, alcohols, such as methanol and ethanol, aldehydes, carbon dioxide, and hydrogen. Ammonia and hydrogen sulfide are other products of acidogenesis. This bacteria operate within a pH range from 4.0 to 8.5. This process can also lower pH inside the biodigester over time causing the microbes not to be able to function. For this reason pH must be carefully monitored.

Since acidogenesis is early in the process of anaerobic digestion, most of the organic matter has not been fully degraded leaving a digestate that is fibrous and consists of structural plant matter including lignin and cellulose. Thus, it is often referred to as solid digestate. Acidogenic digestate has high moisture retention properties. The digestate may also contain minerals (primarily phosphorus) and remnants of bacteria.

== Methanogenic digestate ==
Methanogenesis is the last stage of anaerobic digestion. During this phase methanogenic Archaea produce methane from the substrates generated during acetogenesis. These substrates are mainly acetate and hydrogen. Methanogenesis can also occur using another metabolism based on the cooperation of fermenting bacteria and methanogens archaea, the syntrophic methanogenic pathway. During syntrophic methanogens bacteria belonging mainly to the Clostridia class oxidize acetate into hydrogen and CO_{2}, which are successively exploited by hydrogenotrophic Archaea for the methanogens. The methanogenic microbes are fairly sensitive to pH changes and prefer a range from 5.0 to 8.5 depending on the species. This is why in some biodigesters the chambers for the different anaerobic digestions stages will be separated for optimal biogas production.

By this point most of the organic matter has broken down leaving behind the Methanogenic digestate known as a sludge (sometimes called a liquor or liquid digestate). The sludge is high in nutrients such as ammoniums and potassium. The other byproduct of this step is methane, which is often collected and used as a fuel source.

== Whole digestate ==
This is when the fibrous digestate (solid fraction) of the acidogenic digestate is combined with the liquor digestate (liquid fraction) of the methanogenic digestate to create the whole digestate. This combination of the two digestates consists as a sludge form. The liquid fraction constitutes up to 90% of the digestate by volume, contains 2–6% dry matter, particles <1.2 mm in size, and most of the soluble nitrogen and potassium, while the solid fraction retains most of the digestate phosphorus, and contains dry matter content ˃ 15%.

Combining the two into a whole digestate allows for increased availability of a wide array of nutrients that can be useful for agricultural activities. Some anaerobic biodigesters will only have one digestion chamber allowing these two digitates to mix together on their own without further intervention.

== Digestate characteristics ==
The major parameters to assess digestate quality when being used for agricultural applications include pH, nutrients, total solids (TS), volatile solids (VS), and total carbon (TC). This quality depends on feedstock and type of anaerobic digester system. Generally the ammonia content of the digestate accounts for approximately 60-80% of the total nitrogen content, but for a feedstock like kitchen food waste it can be as high as 99%. Digestate has also been reported to have a higher phosphorus and potassium concentration than that of composts. The average P to K ratio is about 1:3. All this together makes digestate a potentially viable source for agricultural soil amendments of certain crops.

== Uses ==
The primary use of digestate is as a soil conditioner. Acidogenic digestate provides moisture retention and organic content for soils. This organic material can break down further, aerobically in soil. Methanogenic digestate provides nutrients for plant growth. It can also be used to protect soils against erosion.

Acidogenic digestate can also be used as an environmentally friendly filler to give structure to composite plastics.

Growth trials on digestate originating from mixed waste have shown healthy growth results for crops. Digestate can also be used in intensive greenhouse cultivation of plants, e.g., in digeponics.

Additionally, both solid and liquid digestates have been shown to be of use in hydroponic crop production. Multiple studies have shown that digestate can produce similar or higher yields across multiple crops when compared to standard growing practices used in hydroponics and soilless substrate growing.

Application of digestate has been shown to inhibit plant diseases and induction of resistance. Digestate application has a direct effect on soil-borne diseases, and an indirect effect by stimulation of biological activity.

== Digestate and compost ==
Digestate is technically not compost although it is similar to it in physical and chemical characteristics. Compost is produced by aerobic digestion-decomposition by aerobes. This includes fungi and bacteria which are able to break down the lignin and cellulose to a greater extent.

Treatment, for example by ultrasonication, has shown to enhance solubilization of digestate as measured by increased levels of soluble chemical oxygen demand (sCOD), soluble total organic carbon (sTOC), and soluble total nitrogen (sTN) released into the solution.

In plants where solid digestate is further aerobically stabilised, matured or composted, an additional reject stream, sometimes referred to as a compost reject fraction, may be generated during screening or compost refining. This material can contain plastics, glass, metals, oversized particles and other inert contaminants, and its generation is influenced by feedstock quality and the efficiency of pre-treatment and separation steps.

== Standards for digestate ==
The standard of digestate produced by anaerobic digestion can be assessed on three criteria, chemical, biological and physical aspects. Chemical quality needs to be considered in terms of heavy metals and other inorganic contaminant, persistent organic compounds and the content of macro-elements such as nitrogen, phosphorus and potassium. Depending on their source, biowastes can contain pathogens, which can lead to the spreading of human, animal or plant diseases if not appropriately managed.

The physical standards of composts includes mainly appearance and odor factors. Whilst physical contamination does not present a problem with regards to human, plant or animal health, contamination (in the form of plastics, metals and ceramics) can cause a negative public perception. Even if the compost is of high quality and all standards are met, a negative public perception of waste-based composts still exists. The presence of visible contaminants reminds users of this.

Quality control of the feedstock is the most important way of ensuring a quality end product. The content and quality of waste arriving on-site should be characterised as thoroughly as possible prior to being supplied.

In the UK the Publicly Available Specification (called PAS110) governs the definition of digestate derived from the anaerobic digestion of source-segregated biodegradable materials. The specification ensures all digested materials are of consistent quality and fit for purpose. If a biogas plant meets the standard, its digestate will be regarded as having been fully recovered and to have ceased to be waste, and it can be sold with the name "bio-fertiliser".

== See also ==
- Anaerobic decomposition
- Anaerobic digester types
- Anaerobic digestion
- Biogas powerplant
- Biosolids
- Mechanical biological treatment
