= Thermophilic digester =

Type of biodigester

A thermophilic digester or thermophilic biodigester is a kind of biodigester that operates at temperatures of 50–60 °C (122–140 °F), producing biogas. It has some advantages: it does not need agitation and is faster in fermentation than a mesophilic digester. In fact, it can be as much as six to ten times faster than a normal biodigester. The problem is that for use in this biodigester, the source must enter at high temperature. Vinasse is produced at more than 70 °C (158 °F) and can be used in this kind of biodigester. For each unit of volume of ethanol, about eight units of vinasse are produced. In Brazil, this kind of biodigester is used to process vinasse as a cheap source of methane.
