= Vinasse =

Byproduct of the sugar or ethanol industry

Vinasse is a byproduct of the sugar or ethanol industry. Sugarcane or sugar beet is processed to produce crystalline sugar, pulp and molasses. The latter are further processed by fermentation to ethanol, ascorbic acid or other products. Juice sugarcane can also be processed directly by ethanol fermentation. After the removal of the desired product (alcohol, ascorbic acid, etc.) the remaining material is called vinasse. Vinasse is sold after a partial dehydration and usually has a viscosity comparable to molasses. Commercially offered vinasse comes either from sugar cane and is called cane-vinasse or from sugar beet and is called beet-vinasse. Vinasse produced from sugar cane is also called dunder.

In the process of distillation of the alcohol and as a result of the heating in the distillation process, in the pulp of the beet reactions of condensation and predominantly molecular ruptures take place. This causes a high fulvic acid concentration in this byproduct. One use of vinasse is in thermophilic digesters. In Brazil, thermophilic digestion is a source of biogas using pure and hot vinasse as the source of production of methane. In the past, vinasse was a problem in production of ethanol, but vinasse is also a good fertilizer (at least for some time) and a source of methane that can be used to generate heat or electricity. Moreover, other uses of vinasse involving also the formulation of nutritive solutions for hydroponics, formulation of culture media for plant tissue culture and culture media for algal growth.

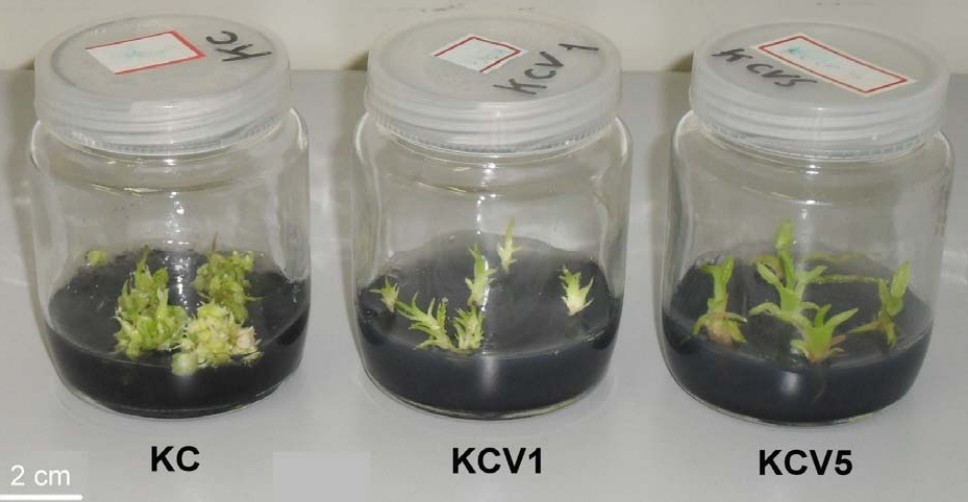
(KCV1 and KCV5) Vinasse used to formulate culture media for the in vitro elongation and rooting of Oncidium leucochilum (orchid), (KC) medium Knudson C used as control. In order to formulate the vinasse media was used a dilution of 2.5% vinasse. These culture media are free of plant growth regulators (Silva et al., 2014).

== See also ==
- Bagasse
- Dunder
