= Oxygen-free =

Oxygen-free may refer to the absence of oxygen in an environment or in a material.

Not to be confused with free oxygen, oxygen in the atmosphere of Earth that is not combined with other elements and may be breathed by living beings.

== Environmental conditions ==
- Hypoxia (environmental), an environment with low, or near-zero, oxygen content, commonly called anoxia;
- Anaerobic (disambiguation), a technical word which literally means without air (where "air" is generally used to mean oxygen), as opposed to aerobic;
- Aerobic (disambiguation), antonym of anaerobic

== Oxygen-free materials ==
- Oxygen-free copper, pure copper without oxygen in its crystal lattice;
- OFHC, oxygen-free high thermal conductivity copper;
- CuOFP, oxygen-free pure copper containing phosphorus
