= Upflow anaerobic sludge blanket digestion =

Form of anaerobic digester used for wastewater treatment

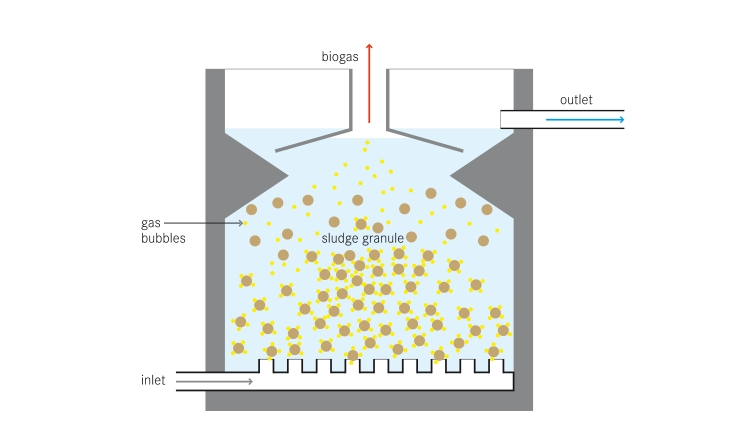
Schematic of an upflow anaerobic sludge blanket reactor (UASB): Wastewater enters the reactor from the bottom and flows upward.

Upflow anaerobic sludge blanket (UASB) technology, normally referred to as UASB reactor, is a form of anaerobic digester that is used for wastewater treatment.

The UASB reactor is a methanogenic (methane-producing) digester that evolved from the anaerobic clarigester. A similar but variant technology to UASB is the expanded granular sludge bed (EGSB) digester.

== Process description ==
UASB uses an anaerobic process whilst forming a blanket of granular sludge which suspends in the tank. Wastewater flows upwards through the blanket and is processed (degraded) by the anaerobic microorganisms. The upward flow combined with the settling action of gravity suspends the blanket with the aid of flocculants. The blanket begins to reach maturity at around three months. Small sludge granules begin to form whose surface area is covered in aggregations of bacteria. In the absence of any support matrix, the flow conditions create a selective environment in which only those microorganisms capable of attaching to each other survive and proliferate. Eventually the aggregates form into dense compact biofilms referred to as "granules".

Biogas with a high concentration of methane is produced as a by-product, and this may be captured and used as an energy source, to generate electricity for export and to cover its own running power. The technology needs constant monitoring when put into use to ensure that the sludge blanket is maintained, and not washed out (thereby losing the effect). The heat produced as a by-product of electricity generation can be reused to heat the digestion tanks.

The blanketing of the sludge enables a dual solid and hydraulic (liquid) retention time in the digesters. Solids requiring a high degree of digestion can remain in the reactors for periods up to 90 days. Sugars dissolved in the liquid waste stream can be converted into gas quickly in the liquid phase which can exit the system in less than a day.

UASB reactors are typically suited to dilute waste water streams (3% TSS with particle size >0.75mm).

=== Historical course ===
Over time, the UASB model has been upgraded, pain points have been addressed, and design has been optimized - ultimately resulting in the following types of systems.

- Second generation UASB reactors, the EGSB (Expended Granule Sludge Blanket) reactor. This is a single layer high load system, with only one settler layer. The upflow speeds are many times higher than in UASB, so that the 'adult' granules remain in the system, 'baby' granules often wash out. Typical loading rates for an EGSB; 15 - 30kg COD / m3 / day. The EGSB is a largely closed system. There is no or little chance of corrosion or odor nuisance.
- Third generation UASB reactors, the ECSB reactor. This is a double layer high load system, with 2 settler layers. The upflow rates are high below the first settler layer, and low below the second settler layer - this keeps both the 'adult' and 'baby' grains in the system, which pays off in greater net growth of granular sludge. Typical loading rates for an ECSB; 15 - 35 kg COD / m3 / day. The ECSB is a closed system. There is no chance of corrosion or odor nuisance.

== Design ==
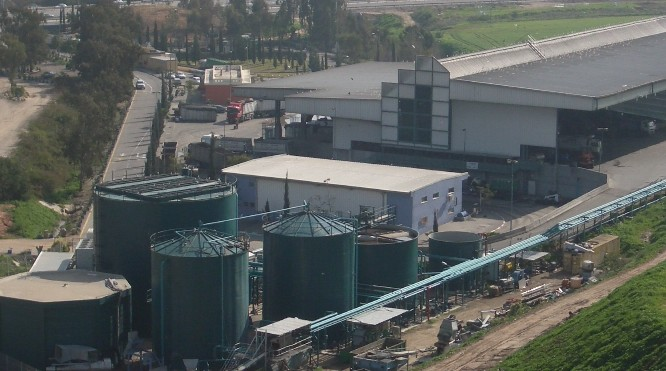
UASB reactor shown is the larger tank. Hiriya, Tel Aviv, Israel

With UASB (but also EGSB and ECSB), the process of settlement and digestion occurs in one or more large tank(s). The effluent from the UASB, which has a much reduced biochemical oxygen demand (BOD) concentration, usually needs to be treated further, for example with the activated sludge process, depending on the effluent quality requirements.

== See also ==
- Anaerobic digestion
- Anaerobic digester types
- Anaerobic filter
- Expanded granular sludge bed digestion
- Hybrid reactor (combination of UASB and an anaerobic filter)
- Fluidized bed reactor
- List of waste-water treatment technologies
