= Mesophilic digester =

Type of biodigester

Mesophilic digester or Mesophilic biodigester is a kind of biodigester that operates at temperatures between 20 °C and about 40°, typically 37 °C. This is the most used kind of biodigester in the world. More than 90% of worldwide biodigesters are of this type. In contrast, thermophilic digesters are less than 10% of digesters in the world, as it is more difficult to maintain the higher temperatures in a treatment plant, and they typically perform worse at separating liquids out of the sludge. Mesophilic digesters are used to produce biogas, biofertilizers, and sanitarization mainly in tropical countries such as India and Brazil.
