= Anaerobic filter =

Technology used in sewage treatment

In sewage treatment systems, an anaerobic filter (AF) is a form of anaerobic digester. The digestion tank contains a filter medium where anaerobic microbial populations—organisms that live in the absence of oxygen — can establish themselves. Such filters are commonly employed in the treatment of waste water. These reactors are gaining in popularity versus more established aerobic waste-water treatment systems because they produce a less solid residue than do other types of filter.

== See also ==
- Anaerobic digester types
- Anaerobic digestion
- List of waste-water treatment technologies
