= Anaerobic contact process =

Type of anaerobic digester

The anaerobic contact process is a type of anaerobic digester. Here a set of reactors are created in series, where biomass is separated and returned to the complete mixture. This recycled material is pumped up into the bottom of the first reactor, an upflow reactor. The upflow anaerobic process is a large reactor which allows the waste to flow up from the bottom and separates the waste into 3 zones. At the very top is the biogas zone where the gas is collected. Bacteria digest waste in the lowest portion of the upflow reactor; the bioreactor zone. In between these two stages is the clarifier zone where which exports the stabilised waste.

== See also ==
- Anaerobic digester types
