= Anaerobic digester types =

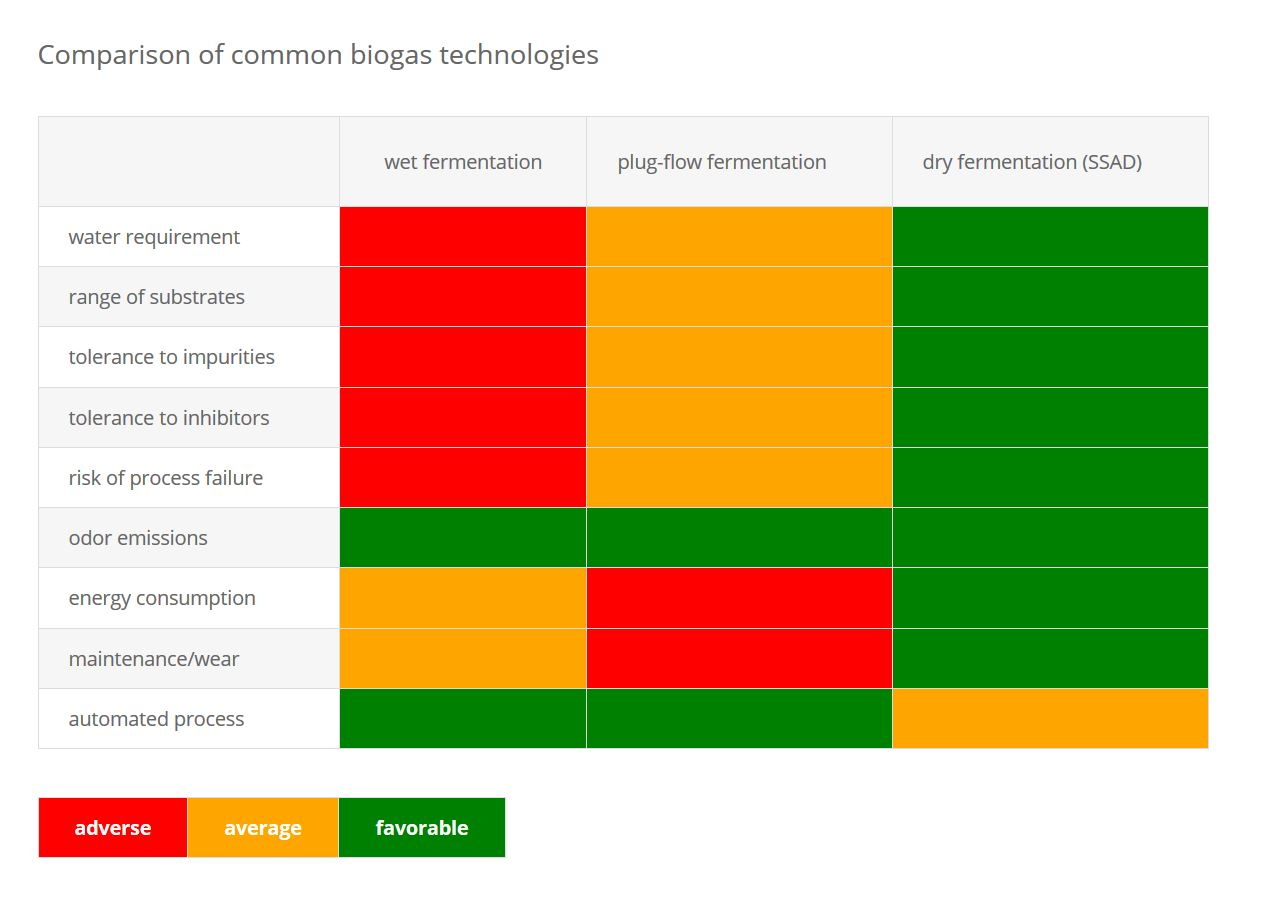
Comparison of common AD digester technology types.

The following is a partial list of types of anaerobic digesters. These processes and systems harness anaerobic digestion for purposes such as treatment of biowaste, animal manure, sewage and biogas generation.

== Classification ==
Anaerobic digesters can be categorized according to several criteria: by whether the biomass is fixed to a surface ("attached growth") or can mix freely with the reactor liquid ("suspended growth"); by the organic loading rate (the influent mass rate of chemical oxygen demand per unit volume); by centralized plants and decentralized plants.

Most anaerobic digesters worldwide are built based on wet-type anaerobic digestion, wherein biomass (usually animal dung) and water are mixed in equal amounts to form a slurry in which the content of total solids (TS) is about 10-15%. This method is commonly used in wastewater treatment plants, where large quantities of water are already available in the feedstock. While this type is suitable for most regions, it becomes a challenge in large plants where it necessitates the use of large quantities of water every day in water-scarce areas.

Solid-state type digesters, as opposed to the wet-type digesters, reduces the need to dilute the biomass before using it for digestion. Solid-state type digesters can handle dry, stackable biomass with a high percentage of solids (up to 40%), and consists of gas-tight chambers called fermenter boxes working in batch-mode that are periodically loaded and unloaded with solid biomass and manure. The widely used UASB reactor, for example, is a suspended-growth high-rate digester, with its biomass clumped into granules that will settle relatively easily and with typical loading rates in the range 5-10 kgCOD/m^{3}/d.

Most common types of anaerobic digestion are liquid, plug-flow, and solid-state type digesters.

== Examples ==
Examples of anaerobic digesters include:

- Anaerobic activated sludge process
- Anaerobic clarigester
- Anaerobic contact process
- Anaerobic expanded-bed reactor
- Anaerobic filter
- Anaerobic fluidised bed
- Anaerobic lagoon
- Anaerobic MBRs
- Anaerobic migrating blanket reactor
- Batch system anaerobic digester
- Continuous stirred-tank reactor (CSTR)
- Expanded granular sludge bed digestion (EGSB)
- Hybrid reactor
- Imhoff tank
- Internal circulation reactor (IC)
- One-stage anaerobic digester
- Plug-flow anaerobic digester
- Submerged media anaerobic reactor
- Sintex Digester
- Solid-state anaerobic digester (SSAD)
- Two-stage anaerobic digester
- Upflow anaerobic sludge blanket digestion (UASB)
- Upflow and down-flow anaerobic attached growth
