= Aerobic =

Aerobic means "requiring air," in which "air" usually means oxygen.

Aerobic may also refer to

- Aerobic exercise, prolonged exercise of moderate intensity
- Aerobics, a form of aerobic exercise
- Aerobic respiration, the aerobic process of cellular respiration
- Aerobic organism, a living thing with an oxygen-based metabolism

== See also ==
- Anaerobic (disambiguation)
