= The Bristol Cable =

Independent media company in Bristol, UK

- Type: Website and quarterly print edition
- Owner: Co-operative society
- Staff writers: Approx 9
- Founded: 2014
- Headquarters: Silver Street, Bristol, England
- Website: Official website

The Bristol Cable is an independent media co-operative in Bristol, UK, founded in 2014. It provides local news through independent investigative journalism, in a quarterly print publication and website, both free. As a co-operative, The Bristol Cable is owned by its members, who pay a monthly fee. The publication has a print run of 30,000 copies, distributed throughout the city.

The Bristol Cable was founded by Alec Saelens, Adam Cantwell-Corn and Alon Aviram. It is part of the Global Investigative Journalism Network.

== History ==
As of December 2017 the co-op cost £1 per month to join, had 1,900 members who contributed on average £2.70 per month; and had six full-time staff. Membership provides a means of funding the newspaper and gives members a say in strategic decisions about the co-op.

In 2019 The Bristol Cable won the Press Gazette British Journalism Award for Local Journalism, noting its five year investigation into modern day slavery by a local employer. In 2021 the Press Gazette again noted the investigative journalism and successful development of The Bristol Cable, with membership at 2,600.

== Stories broken by The Bristol Cable ==
The Bristol Cable has broken stories on workplace abuses in the catering sector (October 2014); Bristol University's holdings in fossil fuels, which was used by people campaigning for its divestment and prompted a change by the University (June 2015); ownership of property in the city by offshore companies based in tax havens (January 2016 and January 2018); the Mayor and senior council officials hiding the potential for deep well fracking from councillors and the public, to prevent disruption to the sale of Bristol Port land (May 2016); the use by local police of mass surveillance devices, known as IMSI-catchers or Stingray phone trackers, that eavesdrop on mobile phone and other devices, which became a national news story (October 2016); local companies' links to the arms trade (February 2017); poor working conditions (March 2017); racial bias in Immigration Enforcement officers' stop and checks of people on the street they suspect of immigration offences (October 2017, with the Bureau of Investigative Journalism); and the small share of new property developments given over to affordable housing, in comparison with the official policy of Bristol City Council (March 2018).

== Other funding sources ==
To set up, produce its first issue, and launch citizen journalism workshops, it raised £3,300 in a crowdfunding campaign, was given £1,500 by Co-operatives UK and £1,600 by Lush. In 2017 it received a grant of £40,000 from the Reva and David Logan Foundation to expand its capacity in the local community. In 2018 it received a grant of £100,000 a year for two years from the Omidyar Network.
