= Sour mash =

Fermenting material

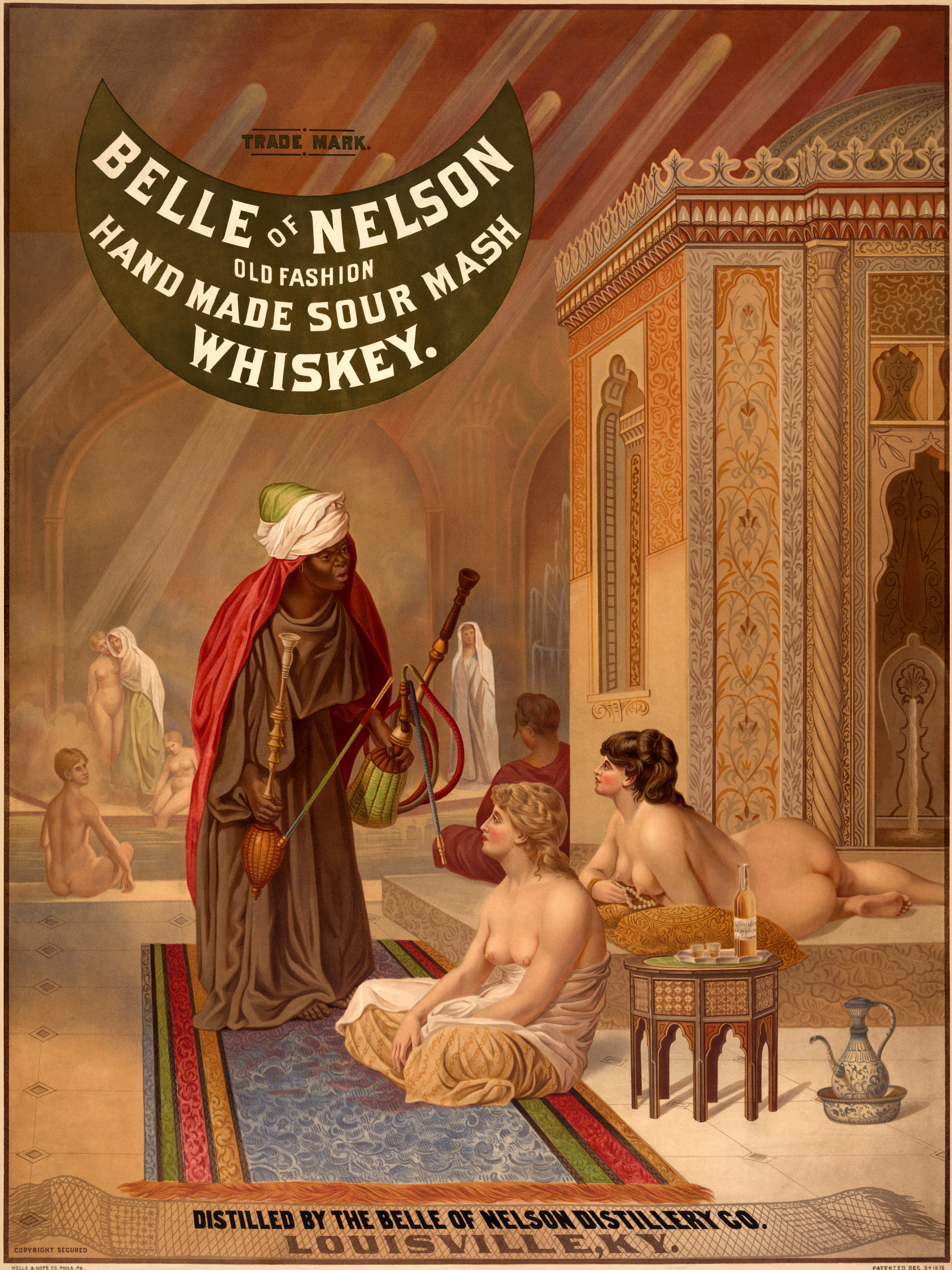
Belle of Nelson poster for their sour mash whiskey

Sour mash (or sourmash) is a process used in the distilling industry that uses material from an older batch of mash to adjust the acidity of a new mash. The term can also be used as the name of the type of mash used in such a process, and a bourbon made using this process can be referred to as a sour mash bourbon.

Sour beer may also be created with this process. Well-known brands of sour mash whiskey are Jim Beam and Jack Daniel's.

== Process ==
In the sour mash process, the mash – a mixture of grain, malt and water – is conditioned with some amount of spent mash (previously fermented mash that still contains dead yeast, a good food source for live yeast). Spent mash is also known as spent beer, distillers' spent grain, and slop or feed mash because it is also used as animal feed. The acid introduced by the sour mash controls the growth of bacteria that could taint the Bourbon. An established and active strain of live yeast is introduced into the mash to be fermented. By using an established and known fermented "sour", this fermentation process controls the introduction and growth of foreign bacteria and yeasts that could damage the Bourbon and improves the consistency and quality of the liquor, ensuring every bottle tastes as similar as possible.

Sour mashing is also a process sometimes used in brewing to make sour beers in a short time frame. In the brewing version of sour mashing, brewers mash in their grains to begin the brewing process, but instead of extracting the wort from the grains at the end of the mash (typically in less than 90 minutes), the brewer leaves the grains and wort together for as long as several days before draining the wort. During this time, the lactic acid bacteria naturally present on the grain ferment some of the sugars in the wort into lactic acid. This lactic acid adds sourness to the beer. In order to promote fast bacterial fermentation and reduce yeast activity, the mash is kept between 100–120 °F (38–49 °C). The brewer extracts the wort by sparging when they believe enough acid has been produced. Some beers employing sour mashing are fermented with the addition of brewing yeast but without a boil. Other brewers prefer to boil their sour mashed beer and then ferment it with brewing yeast. The resulting beers can range from mildly tart to noticeably sour.

== See also ==
- Barm, a pre-fermented residue used in the making of liquors and breads
- Dunder, yeast-rich foam leftovers commonly used in the production of Jamaican rums
- Mash ingredients
