= Anaerobic digestion =

Oxygen-free break down of material

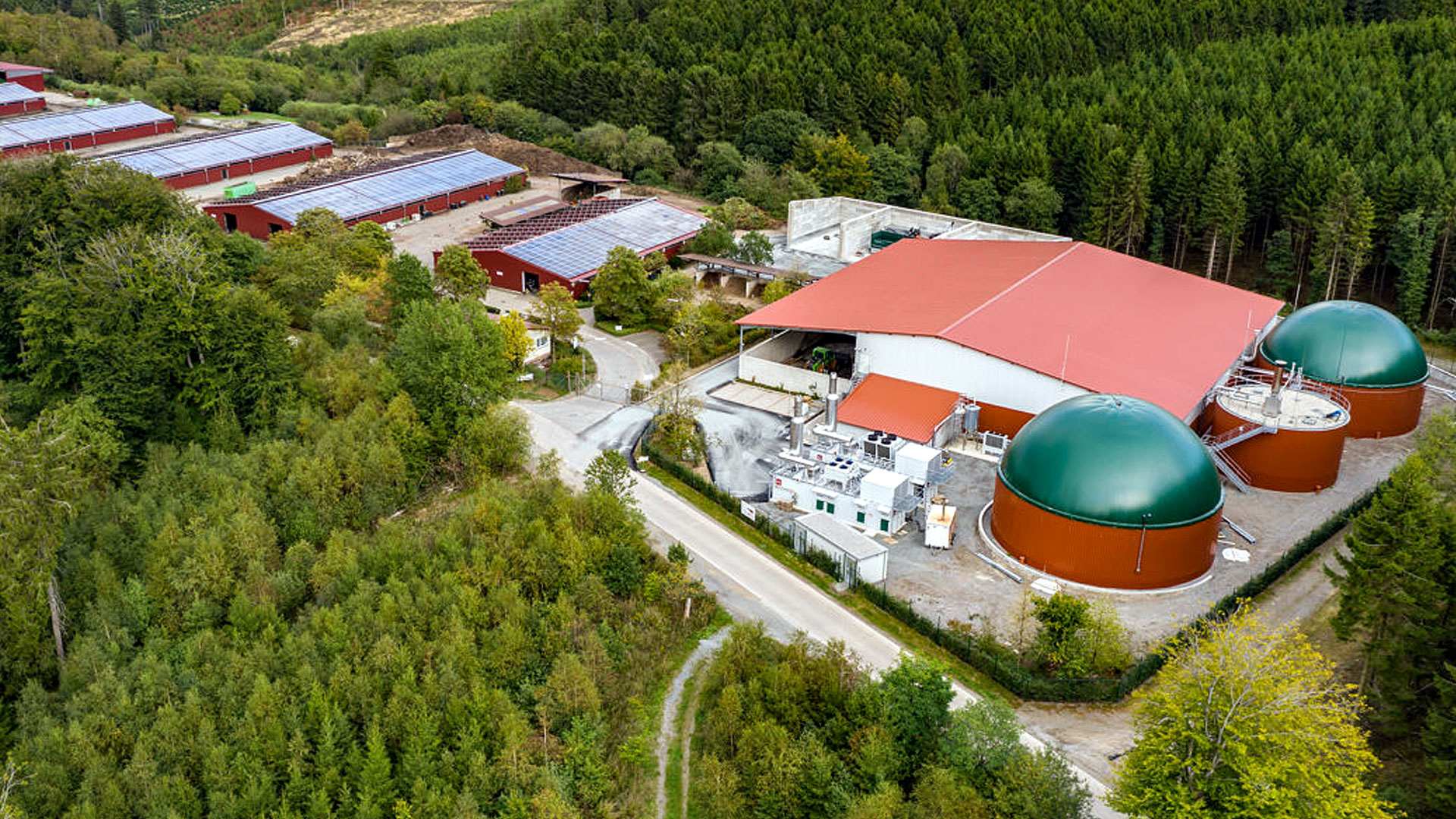
Anaerobic digester system in Germany

Anaerobic digestion is a sequence of processes by which microorganisms break down biodegradable material in the absence of oxygen. The process is used for industrial or domestic purposes to manage waste or to produce fuels. Much of the fermentation used industrially to produce food and drink products, as well as home fermentation, uses anaerobic digestion.

Anaerobic digestion reduces sludge volume and pathogen content while generating methane-rich biogas that can be used for renewable energy production. The liquid remainder, digestate, can be further treated and, in some cases, beneficially reused.

Anaerobic digestion occurs naturally in some soils and in lake and oceanic basin sediments, where it is usually referred to as "anaerobic activity". This is the source of marsh-gas methane, as discovered by Alessandro Volta in 1776.

Anaerobic digestion comprises four stages: hydrolysis, acidogenesis, acetogenesis, and methanogenesis.

The digestion process begins with bacterial hydrolysis of the input materials. Insoluble organic polymers, such as carbohydrates, are broken down to soluble derivatives that become available for other bacteria. Acidogenic bacteria then convert the sugars and amino acids into carbon dioxide, hydrogen, ammonia, and organic acids. In acetogenesis, bacteria convert these resulting organic acids into acetic acid, along with additional ammonia, hydrogen, and carbon dioxide, amongst other compounds. Finally, methanogens convert these products to methane and carbon dioxide. The methanogenic archaea populations play an indispensable role in anaerobic wastewater treatments.

Anaerobic digestion is used as part of the process to treat biodegradable waste and sewage sludge. As part of an integrated waste-management system, anaerobic digestion reduces the emission of landfill gas into the atmosphere. Anaerobic digesters can also be fed with purpose-grown energy crops, such as maize.

Anaerobic digestion is widely used as a source of renewable energy. The process produces a biogas, consisting of methane, carbon dioxide, and traces of other "contaminant" gases. This biogas can be used directly as fuel, in cogeneration plants or upgraded to natural-gas-quality biomethane. The nutrient-rich digestate also produced can be used as fertilizer.

== Process ==
Many microorganisms affect anaerobic digestion, including acetic-acid-forming bacteria (acetogens) and methane-forming archaea (methanogens). These organisms promote a number of chemical processes in converting the biomass to biogas.

Gaseous oxygen is excluded from the reactions by physical containment. Anaerobes use electron acceptors from sources other than oxygen gas. These acceptors can be the organic material itself or may be supplied by inorganic oxides from within the input material. When the oxygen source in an anaerobic system is derived from the organic material itself, the "intermediate" end products are primarily alcohols, aldehydes, and organic acids, plus carbon dioxide. In the presence of specialised methanogens, the intermediates are converted to the "final" end products of methane, carbon dioxide, and trace levels of hydrogen sulfide. In an anaerobic system, the majority of the chemical energy contained within the starting material is released by methanogenic archaea as methane.

Populations of anaerobic microorganisms typically take a significant period of time to establish themselves to be fully effective. Therefore, common practice is to introduce anaerobic microorganisms from materials with existing populations, a process known as "seeding" the digesters, typically accomplished with the addition of sewage sludge or cattle slurry.

=== Process stages ===
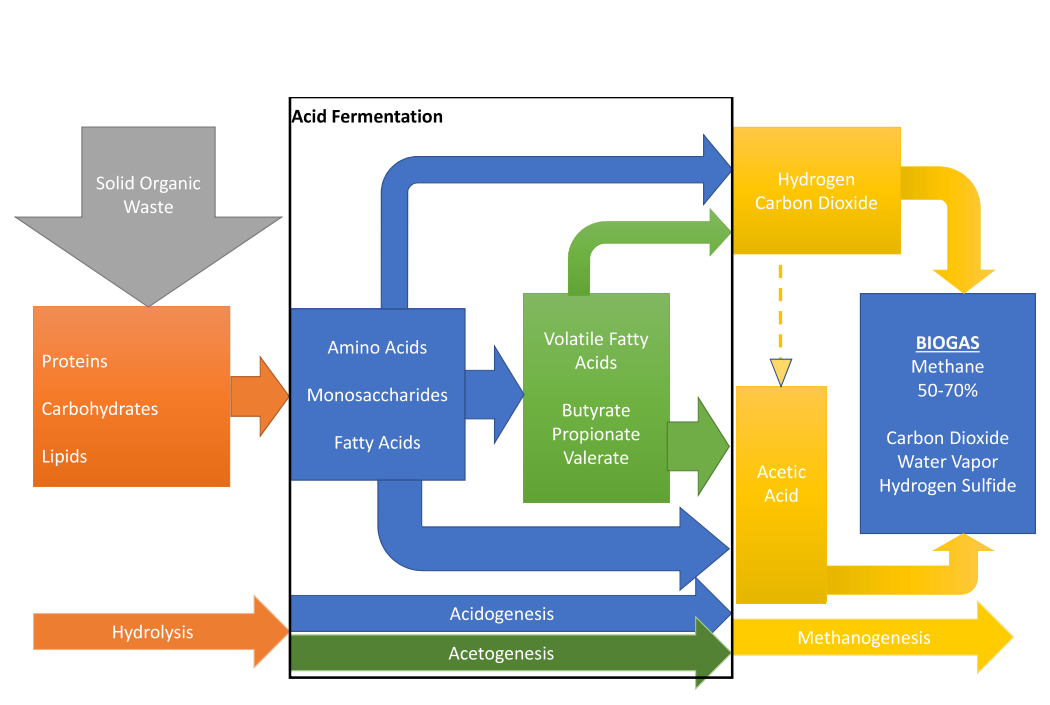
Anaerobic Digestion Process Flow: All process flows are dependent on the balance of between proteins, carbs and fats.

The four key stages of anaerobic digestion involve hydrolysis, acidogenesis, acetogenesis, and methanogenesis. The overall process can be described by the chemical reaction, where organic material such as glucose is biochemically digested into carbon dioxide (CO_{2}) and methane (CH_{4}) by the anaerobic microorganisms:

C_{6}H_{12}O_{6} → 3CO_{2} + 3CH_{4}

Hydrolysis
In most cases, biomass is made up of large organic polymers. For the bacteria in anaerobic digesters to access the energy potential of the material, these chains must first be broken down into their smaller constituent parts. These constituent parts, or monomers, such as sugars, are readily available to other bacteria. The process of breaking these chains and dissolving the smaller molecules into solution is called hydrolysis. Therefore, hydrolysis of these high-molecular-weight polymeric components is the necessary first step in anaerobic digestion. Through hydrolysis, the complex organic molecules are broken down into simple sugars, amino acids, and fatty acids.
Acetate and hydrogen produced in the first stages can be used directly by methanogens. Other molecules, such as volatile fatty acids (VFAs) with a chain length greater than that of acetate must first be catabolised into compounds that can be directly used by methanogens.
Acidogenesis
The biological process of acidogenesis results in further breakdown of the remaining components by acidogenic (fermentative) bacteria. Here, VFAs are created, along with ammonia, carbon dioxide, and hydrogen sulfide, as well as other byproducts. The process of acidogenesis is similar to the way milk sours.
Acetogenesis
The third stage of anaerobic digestion is acetogenesis. Here, simple molecules created through the acidogenesis phase are further digested by acetogens to produce largely acetic acid, as well as carbon dioxide and hydrogen.
Methanogenesis
The terminal stage of anaerobic digestion is the biological process of methanogenesis. Here, methanogens use the intermediate products of the preceding stages and convert them into methane, carbon dioxide, and water. These components make up the majority of the biogas emitted from the system. Methanogenesis is sensitive to both high and low pHs and occurs between pH 6.5 and pH 8. The remaining, indigestible material the microbes cannot use and any dead bacterial remains constitute the digestate.

=== Main Parameters that affect performance ===
Process performance depends on several operational parameters, including temperature (mesophilic conditions at approximately 35–37 °C or thermophilic conditions at 50–55 °C), organic loading rate (OLR), pH (typically maintained between 6.8 and 7.2), and solids retention time (SRT). Proper control of these parameters is essential to prevent process instability and volatile fatty acid accumulation.

=== Configuration ===
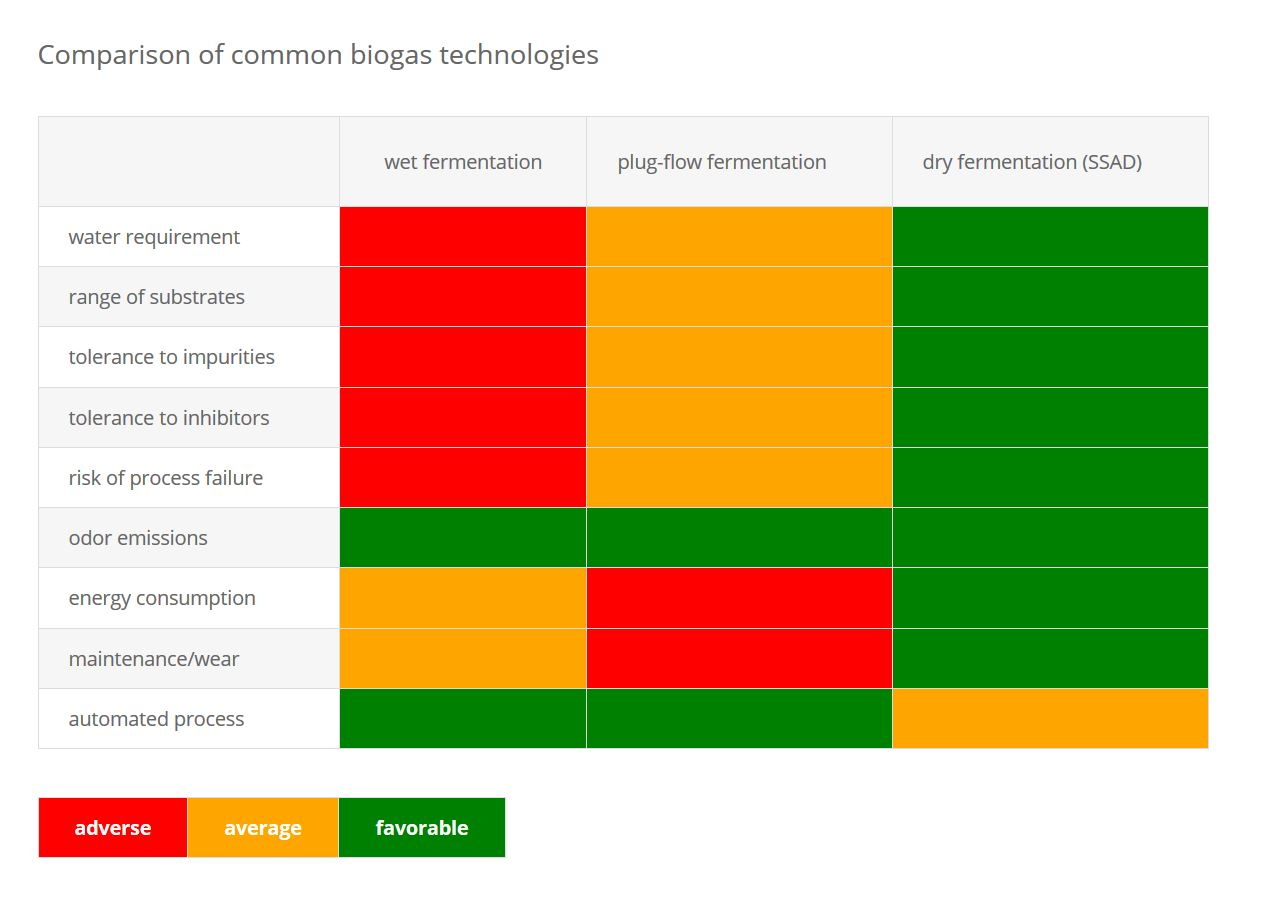
Comparison of common biogas technologies

Anaerobic digesters can be designed and engineered to operate using a number of different configurations and can be categorized into batch vs. continuous process mode, mesophilic vs. thermophilic temperature conditions, high vs. low portion of solids, and single-stage vs. multistage processes. Continuous processes require more complex design, but still may be more economical than batch processes, because batch processes require more initial building money and a larger volume of the digesters (spread across several batches) to handle the same amount of waste as continuous-process digesters. Higher heat energy is required in a thermophilic system compared to a mesophilic system, but the thermophilic system requires much less time and has a larger gas output capacity and higher methane gas content. For solids content, up to 15% solid content is considered low. Above this level is considered high solids content and can also be known as dry digestion. In a single-stage process, one reactor houses the four anaerobic digestion steps. A multistage process uses two or more reactors for digestion to separate the methanogenesis and hydrolysis phases.

==== Batch or continuous ====
Anaerobic digestion can be performed as a batch process or a continuous process. In a batch system, biomass is added to the reactor at the start of the process. The reactor is then sealed for the duration of the process. In its simplest form, batch processing needs inoculation with already-processed material to start the anaerobic digestion. In a typical scenario, biogas production will be formed with a normal distribution pattern over time. Operators can use this fact to determine when they believe the process of digestion of the organic matter has completed. There can be severe odour issues if a batch reactor is opened and emptied before the process is well completed. A more advanced type of batch approach has limited the odour issues by integrating anaerobic digestion with in-vessel composting. In this approach, inoculation takes place through the use of recirculated degasified percolate. After anaerobic digestion has completed, the biomass is kept in the reactor, which is then used for in-vessel composting before it is opened As the batch digestion is simple and requires less equipment and lower levels of design work, it is typically a cheaper form of digestion. Using more than one batch reactor at a plant can ensure constant production of biogas.

In continuous digestion processes, organic matter is constantly added (continuous complete mixed) or added in stages to the reactor (continuous plug flow; first in – first out). Here, the end products are constantly or periodically removed, resulting in constant production of biogas. A single digester or multiple digesters in sequence may be used. Examples of this form of anaerobic digestion include continuous stirred-tank reactors, upflow anaerobic sludge blankets, expanded granular sludge beds, and internal circulation reactors.

==== Temperature ====
The two conventional operational temperature levels for anaerobic digesters determine the species of methanogens in the digesters:

- Mesophilic digestion takes place optimally around 30–38 °C, or at ambient temperatures of 20–45 °C, where mesophiles are the primary microorganisms present.
- Thermophilic digestion takes place optimally around 49–57 °C, or at elevated temperatures up to 70 °C, where thermophiles are the primary microorganisms present.

A limit case has been reached in Bolivia, with anaerobic digestion in temperature working conditions of less than 10 °C. The anaerobic process is very slow, taking more than three times the normal mesophilic time process. In experimental work at University of Alaska Fairbanks, a 1,000-litre digester using psychrophiles harvested from "mud from a frozen lake in Alaska" has produced 200–300 litres of methane per day, about 20 to 30% of the output from digesters in warmer climates. Mesophilic species outnumber thermophiles, and they are also more tolerant to changes in environmental conditions than thermophiles. Mesophilic systems are, therefore, considered to be more stable than thermophilic digestion systems. In contrast, while thermophilic digestion systems are considered less stable, their energy input is higher, with more biogas being removed from the organic matter in an equal amount of time. The increased temperatures facilitate faster reaction rates, and thus faster gas yields. Operation at higher temperatures facilitates greater pathogen reduction of the digestate. In countries where legislation, such as the Animal By-Products Regulations in the European Union, requires digestate to meet certain levels of pathogen reduction, there may be a benefit to using thermophilic temperatures instead of mesophilic.

Additional pre-treatment can be used to reduce the necessary retention time to produce biogas. For example, certain processes shred the substrates to increase the surface area or use a thermal pretreatment stage (such as pasteurisation) to significantly enhance the biogas output. The pasteurisation process can also be used to reduce the pathogenic concentration in the digestate, leaving the anaerobic digester. Pasteurisation may be achieved by heat treatment combined with maceration of the solids.

==== Solids content ====
In a typical scenario, three different operational parameters are associated with the solids content of the feedstock to the digesters:

- High solids (dry—stackable substrate)
- High solids (wet—pumpable substrate)
- Low solids (wet—pumpable substrate)

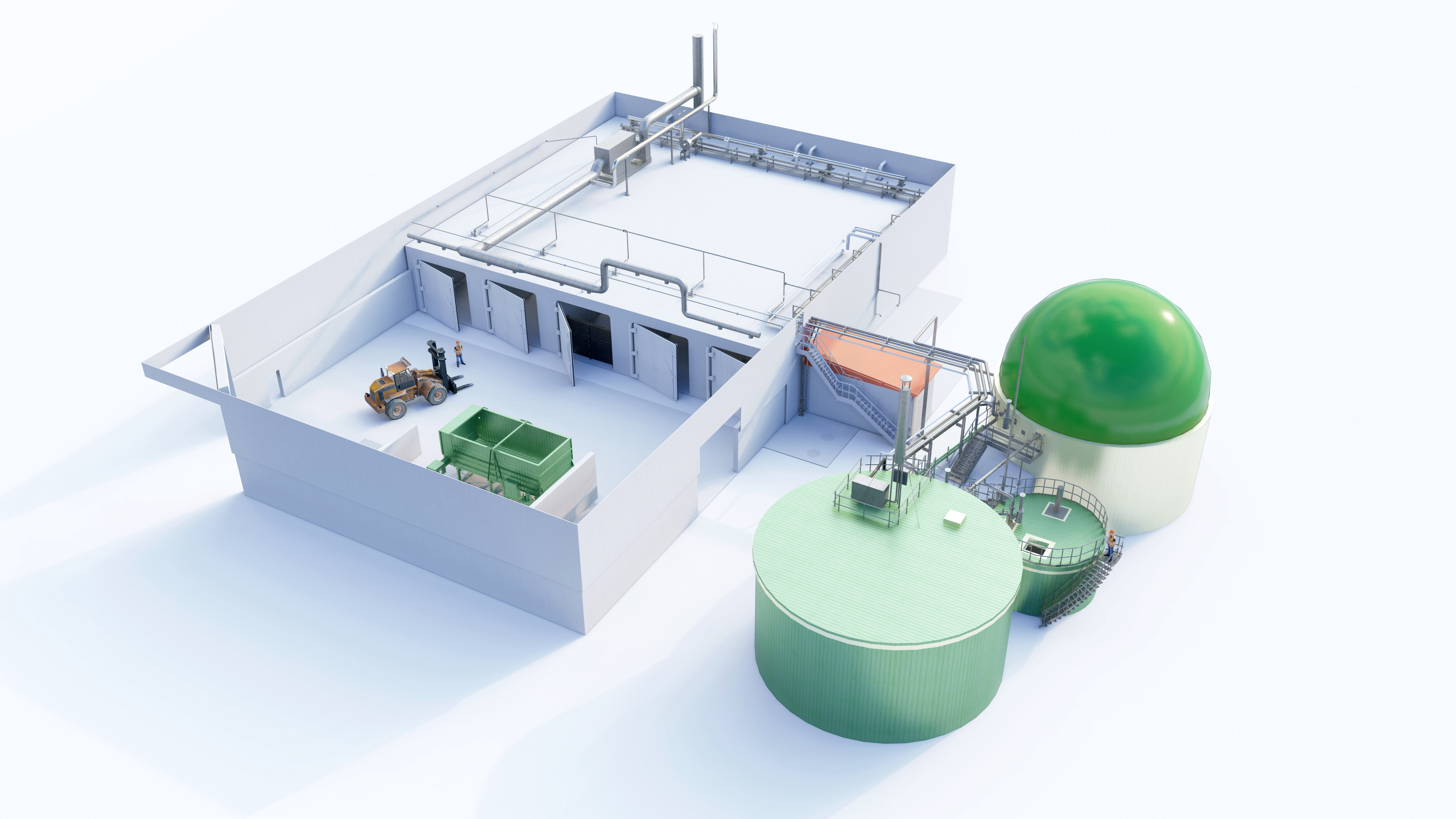
Design of a dry/solid-state anaerobic digestion (AD) biogas plant

High-solids (dry) digesters are designed to process materials with a solids content of 25–40%. Unlike wet digesters that process pumpable slurries, high-solids (dry – stackable substrate) digesters are designed to process solid substrates without the addition of water. The primary styles of dry digesters are continuous vertical plug-flow and batch tunnel horizontal digesters. Continuous vertical plug-flow digesters are upright, cylindrical tanks where feedstock is continuously fed into the top of the digester, and flows downward by gravity during digestion. In batch tunnel digesters, the feedstock is deposited in tunnel-like chambers with gas-tight doors. Neither approach has mixing inside the digester. The amount of pretreatment, such as contaminant removal, depends upon both the natures of the waste streams being processed and the desired quality of the digestate. Size reduction (grinding) is beneficial in continuous vertical systems, as it accelerates digestion, while batch systems avoid grinding and instead require structure (e.g. yard waste) to reduce compaction of the stacked pile. Continuous vertical dry digesters have smaller footprints due to the shorter effective retention time and vertical design. Wet digesters can be designed to operate with either a high solids content, with a total suspended solids (TSS) concentration greater than ~20%, or a low solids concentration less than ~15%.

High-solids (wet) digesters process thick slurries that require more energy input to move and process the feedstock. The thickness of the material may also lead to associated problems with abrasion. High-solids digesters will typically have a lower land requirement due to the lower volumes associated with the moisture. High-solids digesters also require correction of conventional performance calculations (e.g. gas production, retention time, kinetics, etc.) originally based on very dilute sewage digestion concepts, since larger fractions of the feedstock mass are potentially convertible to biogas.

Low-solids (wet) digesters can transport material through the system using standard pumps that require significantly lower energy input. Low-solids digesters require a larger amount of land than high-solids due to the increased volumes associated with the increased liquid-to-feedstock ratio of the digesters. There are benefits associated with operation in a liquid environment, as it enables more thorough circulation of materials and contact between the bacteria and their food. This enables the bacteria to more readily access the substances they are feeding on, and increases the rate of gas production.

==== Complexity ====
Digestion systems can be configured with different levels of complexity. In a single-stage digestion system (one-stage), all of the biological reactions occur within a single, sealed reactor or holding tank. Using a single stage reduces construction costs, but results in less control of the reactions occurring within the system. Acidogenic bacteria, through the production of acids, reduce the pH of the tank. Methanogenic archaea, as outlined earlier, operate in a strictly defined pH range. Therefore, the biological reactions of the different species in a single-stage reactor can be in direct competition with each other. Another one-stage reaction system is an anaerobic lagoon. These lagoons are pond-like earthen basins used for the treatment and long-term storage of manures. Here the anaerobic reactions are contained within the natural anaerobic sludge contained in the pool.

In a two-stage digestion system (multistage), different digestion vessels are optimised to bring maximum control over the bacterial communities living within the digesters. Acidogenic bacteria produce organic acids and more quickly grow and reproduce than methanogenic archaea. Methanogenic archaea require stable pH and temperature to optimise their performance.

Under typical circumstances, hydrolysis, acetogenesis, and acidogenesis occur within the first reaction vessel. The organic material is then heated to the required operational temperature (either mesophilic or thermophilic) prior to being pumped into a methanogenic reactor. The initial hydrolysis or acidogenesis tanks prior to the methanogenic reactor can provide a buffer to the rate at which feedstock is added. Some European countries require a degree of elevated heat treatment to kill harmful bacteria in the input waste. In this instance, there may be a pasteurisation or sterilisation stage prior to digestion or between the two digestion tanks. Notably, it is not possible to completely isolate the different reaction phases, and often some biogas is produced in the hydrolysis or acidogenesis tanks.

==== Residence time ====
The residence time in a digester varies with the amount and type of feed material, and with the configuration of the digestion system. In a typical two-stage mesophilic digestion, residence time varies between 15 and 40 days, while for a single-stage thermophilic digestion, residence time is normally faster and takes around 14 days. The plug-flow nature of some of these systems will mean that the full degradation of the material may not have been realised in this timescale. In this event, digestate exiting the system will be darker in colour and will typically have more odour.

In the case of an upflow anaerobic sludge blanket digester (UASB), hydraulic residence times can be as short as 1 hour to 1 day, and solid retention times can be up to 90 days. In this manner, a UASB system is able to separate solids and hydraulic retention times with the use of a sludge blanket. Continuous digesters have mechanical or hydraulic devices, depending on the level of solids in the material, to mix the contents, enabling the bacteria and the food to be in contact. They also allow excess material to be continuously extracted to maintain a reasonably constant volume within the digestion tanks.

==== Pressure ====
A recent development in anaerobic reactor design is, high-pressure anaerobic digestion (HPAD), also called autogenerative high-pressure digestion (AHPD). This technique produces a biogas with an elevated methane content. The produced carbon dioxide in biogas dissolves more into the water phase under pressure than methane does, so the produced biogas is richer in methane. Research at the University of Groningen demonstrated that the bacterial community changes in composition under the influence of pressure. Individual bacteria species have their optimum circumstances in which they grow and replicate the fastest. Commonly known are pH, temperature, salinity, etc., but pressure is also one of them. Some species have adapted to life in the deep oceans where pressure is much higher than at sea level. This gives another parameter to influence the anaerobic digestion process alongside temperature, retention time, and pH.

=== Inhibition ===
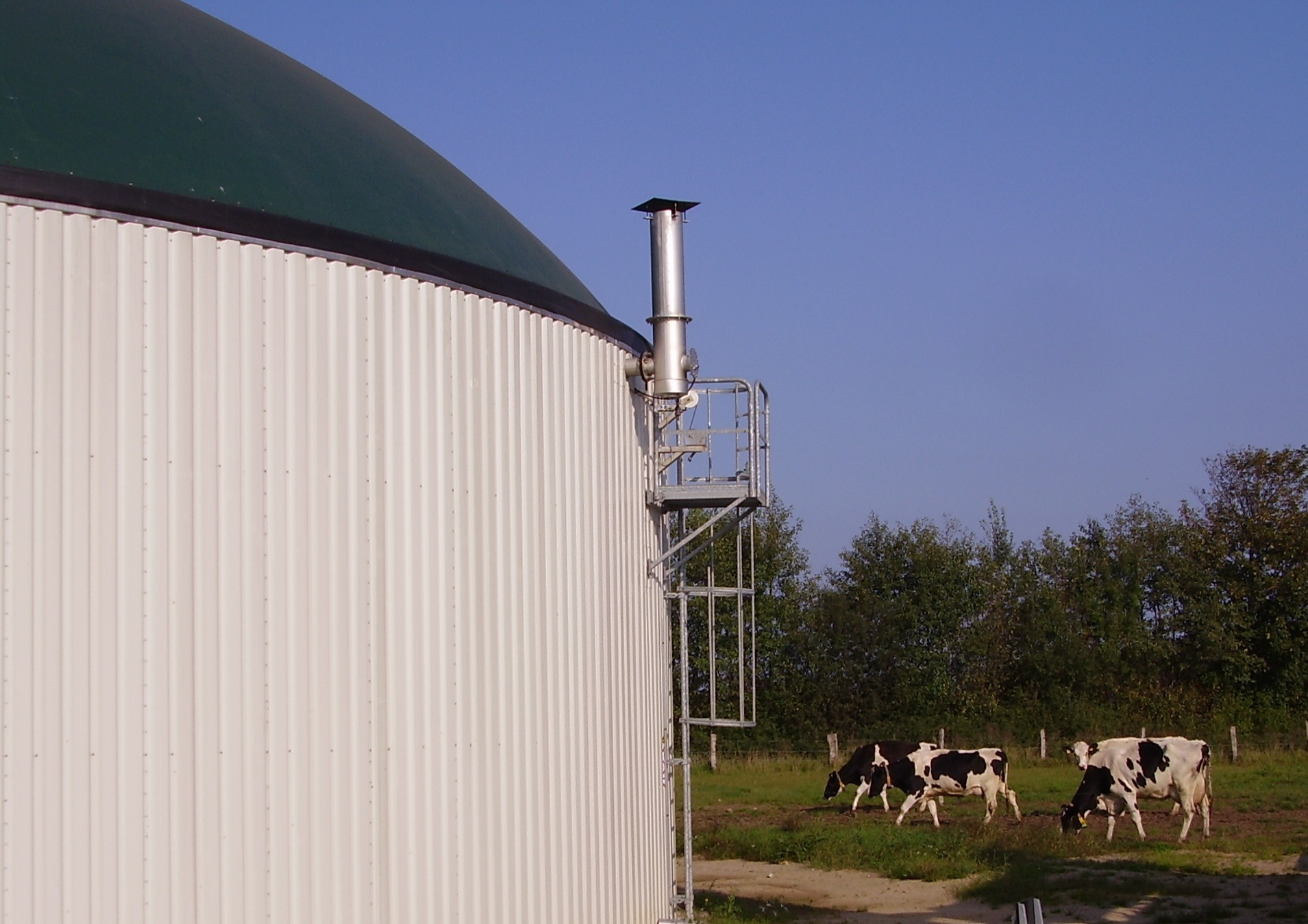
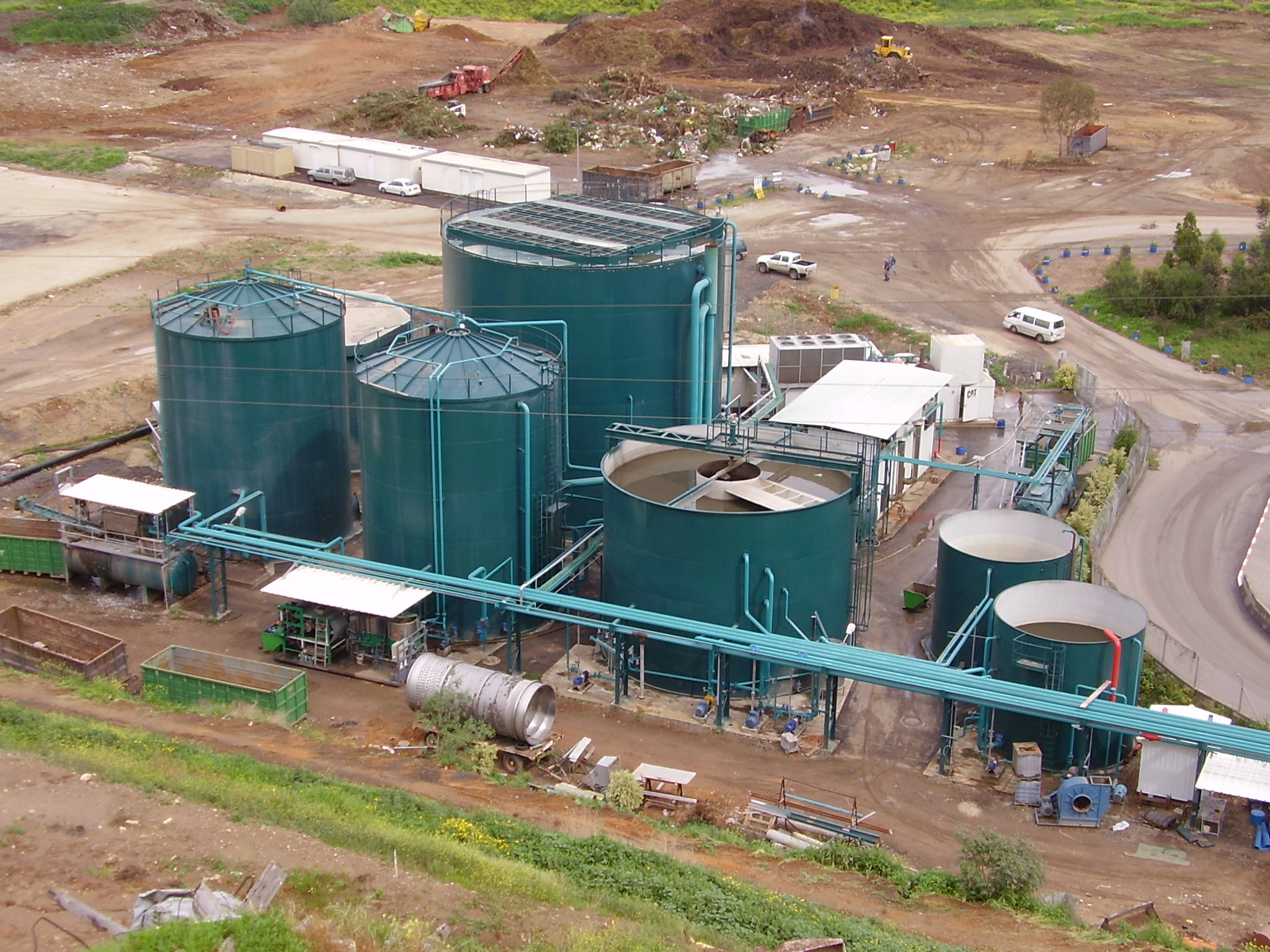
Left: Farm-based maize silage digester located near Neumünster in Germany, 2007 – the green, inflatable biogas holder is shown on top of the digester. Right: Two-stage, low solids, UASB digestion component of a mechanical biological treatment system near Tel Aviv; the process water is seen in balance tank and sequencing batch reactor, 2005.

The anaerobic digestion process can be inhibited by several compounds, affecting one or more of the bacterial groups responsible for the different organic-matter-degradation steps. The degree of the inhibition depends, among other factors, on the concentration of the inhibitor in the digester. Potential inhibitors are ammonia, sulfide, light metal ions (Na, K, Mg, Ca, Al), heavy metals, some organics (chlorophenols, halogenated aliphatics, N-substituted aromatics, long-chain fatty acids), etc.

Total ammonia nitrogen (TAN) has been shown to inhibit production of methane. Furthermore, it destabilises the microbial community, impacting the synthesis of acetic acid. Acetic acid is one of the driving forces in methane production. At an excess of 5000 mg/L TAN, pH adjustment is needed to keep the reaction stable. A TAN concentration above 1700–1800 mg/L inhibits methane production, and yield decreases at greater TAN concentrations. High TAN concentrations cause the reaction to turn acidic and lead to a domino effect of inhibition. Total ammonia nitrogen is the combination of free ammonia and ionized ammonia. TAN is produced through degrading material high in nitrogen, typically proteins, and will naturally build in anaerobic digestion. This is depending on the organic feed stock fed to the system. In typical wastewater treatment practices, TAN reduction is done with via nitrification. Nitrification is an aerobic process where TAN is consumed by aerobic heterotrophic bacteria. These bacteria release nitrate and nitrite, which are later converted to nitrogen gas through the denitrification process. Hydrolysis and acidogenesis can also be impacted by TAN concentration. In mesophilic conditions, inhibition for hydrolysis was found to occur at 5500 mg/L TAN, while acidogenesis inhibition occurs at 6500 mg/L TAN.

== Feedstocks ==
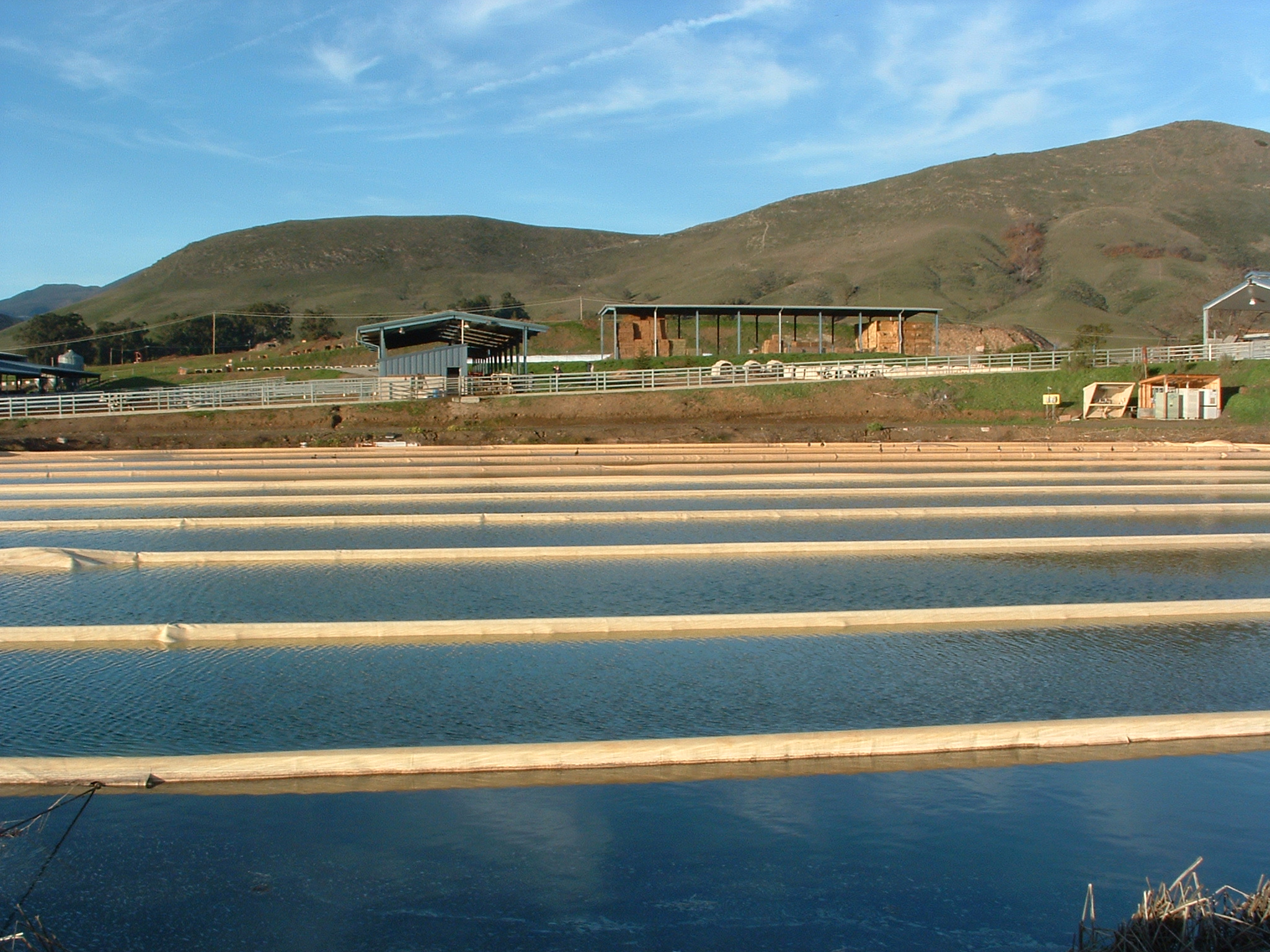
Anaerobic lagoon and generators at the Cal Poly Dairy, United States

The most important initial issue when considering the application of anaerobic digestion systems is the feedstock to the process. Almost any organic material can be processed with anaerobic digestion; however, if biogas production is the aim, then the level of putrescibility is the key factor in its successful application. The more putrescible (digestible) the material, the higher the gas yields possible from the system.

Feedstocks can include biodegradable waste materials, such as waste paper, grass clippings, leftover food, sewage, and animal waste. Woody wastes are the exception, because they are largely unaffected by digestion, as most anaerobes are unable to degrade lignin. Xylophagous anaerobes (lignin consumers) or high-temperature pretreatment, such as pyrolysis, can be used to break lignin down. Anaerobic digesters can also be fed with specially grown energy crops, such as silage, for dedicated biogas production. In continental Europe, these facilities are called biogas plants. A codigestion or cofermentation plant is typically an agricultural anaerobic digester that accepts two or more input materials for simultaneous digestion.

The length of time required for anaerobic digestion depends on the chemical complexity of the material. Material rich in easily-digestible sugars breaks down quickly, whereas intact lignocellulosic material rich in cellulose and hemicellulose polymers can take much longer to break down. Anaerobic microorganisms are generally unable to break down lignin, the recalcitrant aromatic component of biomass.

Anaerobic digesters were originally designed for operation using sewage sludge and manures. Sewage and manure are not, however, the materials with the most potential for anaerobic digestion, as the biodegradable material has already had much of the energy content taken out by the animals that produced it. Therefore, many digesters operate with codigestion of two or more types of feedstock. For example, in a farm-based digester that uses dairy manure as the primary feedstock, the gas production may be significantly increased by adding a second feedstock, such as grass and corn (typical on-farm feedstock), or various organic byproducts, such as slaughterhouse waste, fats, oils, and grease from restaurants, organic household waste, etc. (typical off-site feedstock).

Digesters processing dedicated energy crops can achieve high levels of degradation and biogas production. Slurry-only systems are generally cheaper, but generate far less energy than those using crops, such as maize and grass silage; by using a modest amount of crop material (30%), an anaerobic digestion plant can increase energy output tenfold for only three times the capital cost, relative to a slurry-only system.

=== Moisture content ===
A second consideration related to the feedstock is moisture content. Drier, stackable substrates, such as food and yard waste, are suitable for digestion in tunnel-like chambers. Tunnel-style systems typically have near-zero wastewater discharge, so this style of system has advantages where the discharge of digester liquids are a liability. The wetter the material, the more suitable it will be to handling with standard pumps instead of energy-intensive concrete pumps and physical means of movement. Also, the wetter the material, the more volume and area it takes up relative to the levels of gas produced. The moisture content of the target feedstock will also affect what type of system is applied to its treatment. To use a high-solids anaerobic digester for dilute feedstocks, bulking agents, such as compost, should be applied to increase the solids content of the input material. Another key consideration is the carbon:nitrogen ratio of the input material. This ratio is the balance of food a microbe requires to grow; the optimal C:N ratio is 20–30:1. Excess nitrogen can lead to ammonia inhibition of digestion.

=== Contamination ===
The level of contamination of the feedstock material is a key consideration when using wet digestion or plug-flow digestion.

If the feedstock to the digesters has significant levels of physical contaminants, such as plastic, glass, or metals, then processing to remove the contaminants will be required. If it is not removed, then the digesters can be blocked and will not function efficiently. This contamination issue does not occur with dry digestion or solid-state anaerobic digestion (SSAD) plants, since SSAD handles dry, stackable biomass with a high percentage of solids (40–60%) in gas-tight chambers called fermenter boxes. It is with this understanding that mechanical biological treatment plants are designed. The higher the level of pretreatment a feedstock requires, the more processing machinery will be required, and, hence, the project will have higher capital costs.

After sorting or screening to remove any physical contaminants from the feedstock, the material is often shredded, minced, and mechanically or hydraulically pulped to increase the surface area available to microbes in the digesters and, hence, increase the speed of digestion. The maceration of solids can be achieved by using a chopper pump to transfer the feedstock material into the airtight digester, where anaerobic treatment takes place.

=== Substrate composition ===
Substrate composition is a major factor in determining the methane yield and methane production rates from the digestion of biomass. Techniques to determine the compositional characteristics of the feedstock are available, while parameters such as solids and elemental and organic analyses are important for digester design and operation. Methane yield can be estimated from the elemental composition of substrate along with an estimate of its degradability (the fraction of the substrate that is converted to biogas in a reactor). In order to predict biogas composition (the relative fractions of methane and carbon dioxide) it is necessary to estimate carbon dioxide partitioning between the aqueous and gas phases, which requires additional information (reactor temperature, pH, and substrate composition) and a chemical speciation model. Direct measurements of biomethanation potential are also made using gas evolution or more recent gravimetric assays.

== Applications ==
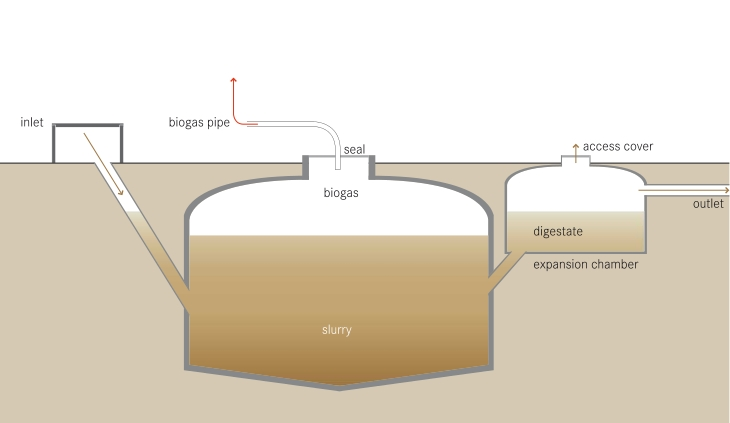
Schematic of an anaerobic digester as part of a sanitation system. It produces a digested slurry (digestate) that can be used as a fertilizer, and biogas that can be used for energy.

Using anaerobic digestion technologies can help to reduce the emission of greenhouse gases in a number of key ways:

- Replacement of fossil fuels
- Reducing or eliminating the energy footprint of waste treatment plants
- Reducing methane emission from landfills
- Displacing industrially produced chemical fertilizers
- Reducing vehicle movements
- Reducing electrical grid transmission losses
- Reducing usage of LP Gas for cooking
- An important component of the Zero Waste initiatives.

=== Waste and wastewater treatment ===
Anaerobic digesters in a sewage treatment plant. The methane gas is managed by burning through a gas flare.

Anaerobic digestion is particularly suited to organic material, and is commonly used for treatment of industrial effluent, wastewater, and sewage sludge. Anaerobic digestion, a simple process, can greatly reduce the amount of organic matter that might otherwise be destined to be dumped at sea, dumped in landfills, or burnt in incinerators.

Pressure from environmentally-related legislation on solid-waste disposal methods in developed countries has increased the application of anaerobic digestion as a process for reducing waste volumes and generating useful byproducts. It may be used to process the source-separated fraction of municipal waste or, combined with mechanical sorting systems, to process residual mixed municipal waste. These facilities are called mechanical biological treatment plants.

If the putrescible waste processed in anaerobic digesters were disposed of in a landfill, it would break down naturally and often anaerobically. In this case, the gas will eventually escape into the atmosphere. As methane is about 20 times more potent as a greenhouse gas than carbon dioxide, this has significant negative environmental effects.

In countries that collect household waste, the use of local anaerobic digestion facilities can help to reduce the amount of waste that requires transportation to centralized landfill sites or incineration facilities. This reduced burden on transportation reduces carbon emissions from the collection vehicles. If localized anaerobic digestion facilities are embedded within an electrical distribution network, then they can help reduce the electrical losses associated with transporting electricity over a national grid.

Anaerobic digestion can be used for the remediation of sludge polluted with PFAS. A 2024 study has shown that anaerobic digestion, combined with adsorption in activated carbon and voltage application, can remove up to 61% of PFAS from sewage sludge.

=== Power generation ===
In developing countries, simple home- and farm-based anaerobic digestion systems offer the potential for low-cost energy for cooking and lighting. Since 1975, China and India have both had large, government-backed schemes for adaptation of small biogas plants for use in the household for cooking and lighting. At present, projects for anaerobic digestion in the developing world can gain financial support through the United Nations Clean Development Mechanism if they are able to show they provide reduced carbon emissions.

Methane and power produced in anaerobic digestion facilities can be used to replace energy derived from fossil fuels, and hence reduce emissions of greenhouse gases, because the carbon in biodegradable material is part of a carbon cycle. The carbon released into the atmosphere from the combustion of biogas has been removed by plants for them to grow in the recent past, usually within the last decade, but more typically within the last growing season. If the plants are regrown, taking the carbon out of the atmosphere once more, then the system will be carbon neutral. In contrast, carbon in fossil fuels has been sequestered in the earth for many millions of years, and its combustion increases the overall levels of carbon dioxide in the atmosphere. Power generation through anaerobic digesters is best suited to large-scale operations, rather than small farms, as large operations have the volume of manure that is able to make the systems financially viable.

Biogas from sewage sludge treatment is sometimes used to run a gas engine to produce electrical power, some or all of which can be used to run the sewage works. Some waste heat from the engine is then used to heat the digester. The waste heat is, in general, enough to heat the digester to the required temperatures. The power potential from sewage works is limited – in the UK, there are about 80 MW total of such generation, with the potential to increase to 150 MW, which is insignificant compared to the average power demand in the UK of about 35,000 MW. The scope for biogas generation from nonsewage waste biological matter – energy crops, food waste, abattoir waste, etc. – is much higher, estimated to be capable of about 3,000 MW. Farm biogas plants using animal waste and energy crops are expected to contribute to reducing CO_{2} emissions and strengthen the grid, while providing UK farmers with additional revenues.

Some countries offer incentives in the form of, for example, feed-in tariffs for feeding electricity onto the power grid to subsidize green energy production.

In Oakland, California, at the East Bay Municipal Utility District's main wastewater treatment plant (EBMUD), food waste is currently codigested with primary and secondary municipal wastewater solids and other high-strength wastes. Compared to municipal wastewater solids digestion alone, food waste codigestion has many benefits. Anaerobic digestion of food waste pulp from the EBMUD food waste process provides a higher normalized energy benefit, compared to municipal wastewater solids: 730 to 1,300 kWh per dry ton of food waste applied compared to 560 to 940 kWh per dry ton of municipal wastewater solids applied.

=== Grid injection ===
The methane component of biogas can be concentrated through upgrading into biomethane. Biomethane (also known as renewable natural gas) can be injected into the natural-gas grid. The upgrading process removes contaminants such as hydrogen sulphide and siloxanes, as well as non-methane gas constituents, chiefly carbon dioxide. Several technologies are available for this purpose, the most widely implemented being pressure swing adsorption, water or amine scrubbing (absorption processes), and membrane separation.

=== Vehicle fuel ===
After upgrading with the above-mentioned technologies, biomethane can be compressed into compressed natural gas and used in natural-gas vehicles. Use of natural gas vehicles is very extensive in Sweden, where over 38,600 gas vehicles exist, and 60% of the CNG supply is biomethane generated in anaerobic digestion plants.

=== Fertiliser and soil conditioner ===
The solid, fibrous component of the digested material can be used as a soil conditioner to increase the organic content of soils. Digester liquor can be used as a fertiliser to supply vital nutrients to soils instead of chemical fertilisers that require large amounts of energy to produce and transport. The use of manufactured fertilisers is, therefore, more carbon-intensive than the use of anaerobic digester liquor fertiliser. In countries such as Spain, where many soils are organically depleted, the markets for the digested solids can be as important as the biogas.

=== Cooking gas ===
Anaerobic digestion can be used at a small scale to produce gas for cooking. Organic waste like fallen leaves, kitchen waste, or food waste is fed into a crusher unit, where it is mixed with a small amount of water. The mixture is then fed into the anaerobic digester, where the archaea decompose it to produce cooking gas. This gas is piped to kitchen stove. A 2-cubic-meter anaerobic digester can produce 2 cubic meters of cooking gas. This is equivalent to 1 kg of LPG.

== Products ==
The three principal products of anaerobic digestion are biogas, digestate, and water.

=== Biogas ===
Typical composition of biogas
Compound	Formula	%
Methane	CH_{4}	50–75
Carbon dioxide	CO_{2}	25–50
Nitrogen	N_{2}	0–10
Hydrogen	H_{2}	0–1
Hydrogen sulfide	H_{2}S	0–3
Oxygen	O_{2}	0–0
Source: www.kolumbus.fi, 2007

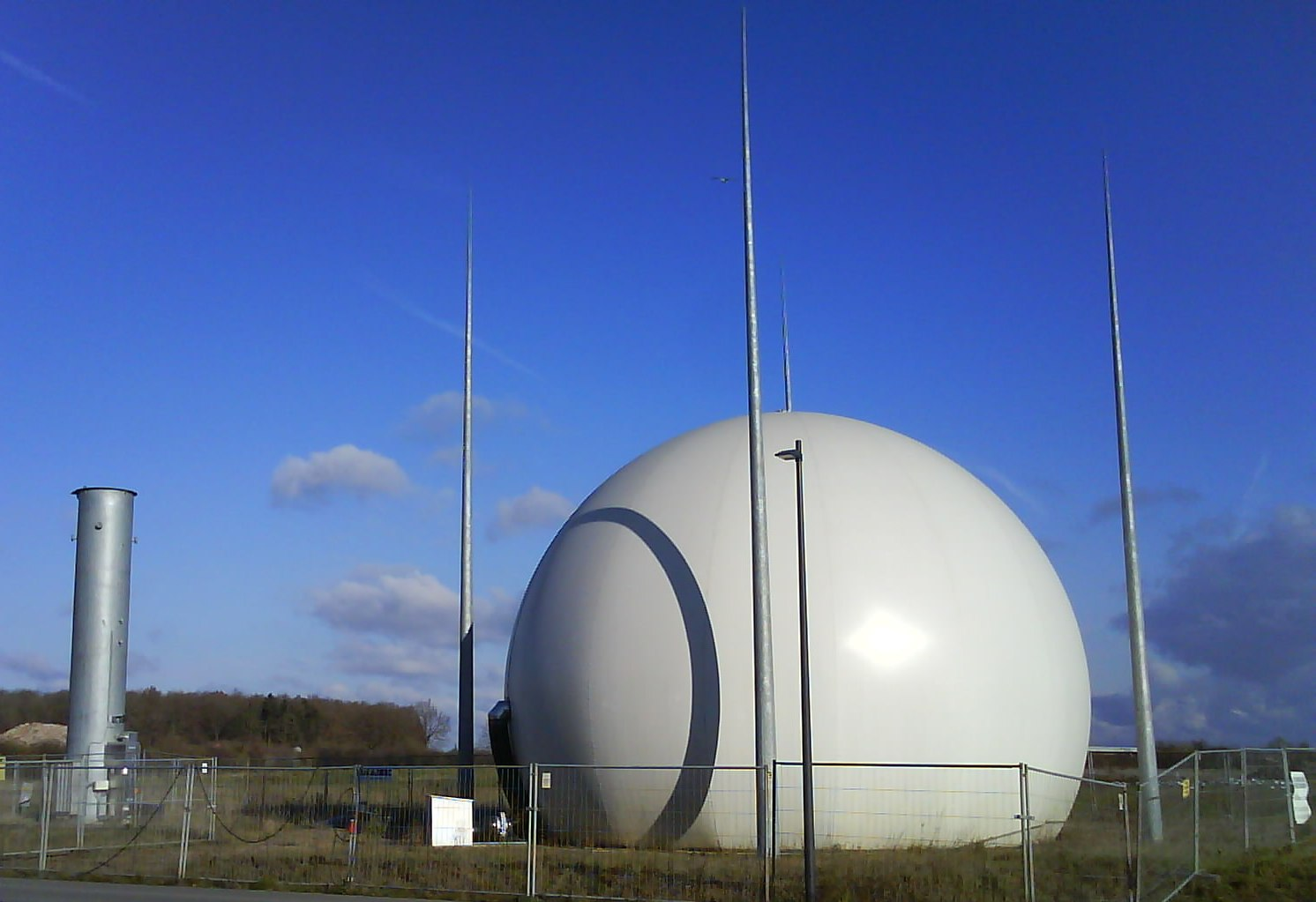
Biogas holder with lightning protection rods and backup gas flare

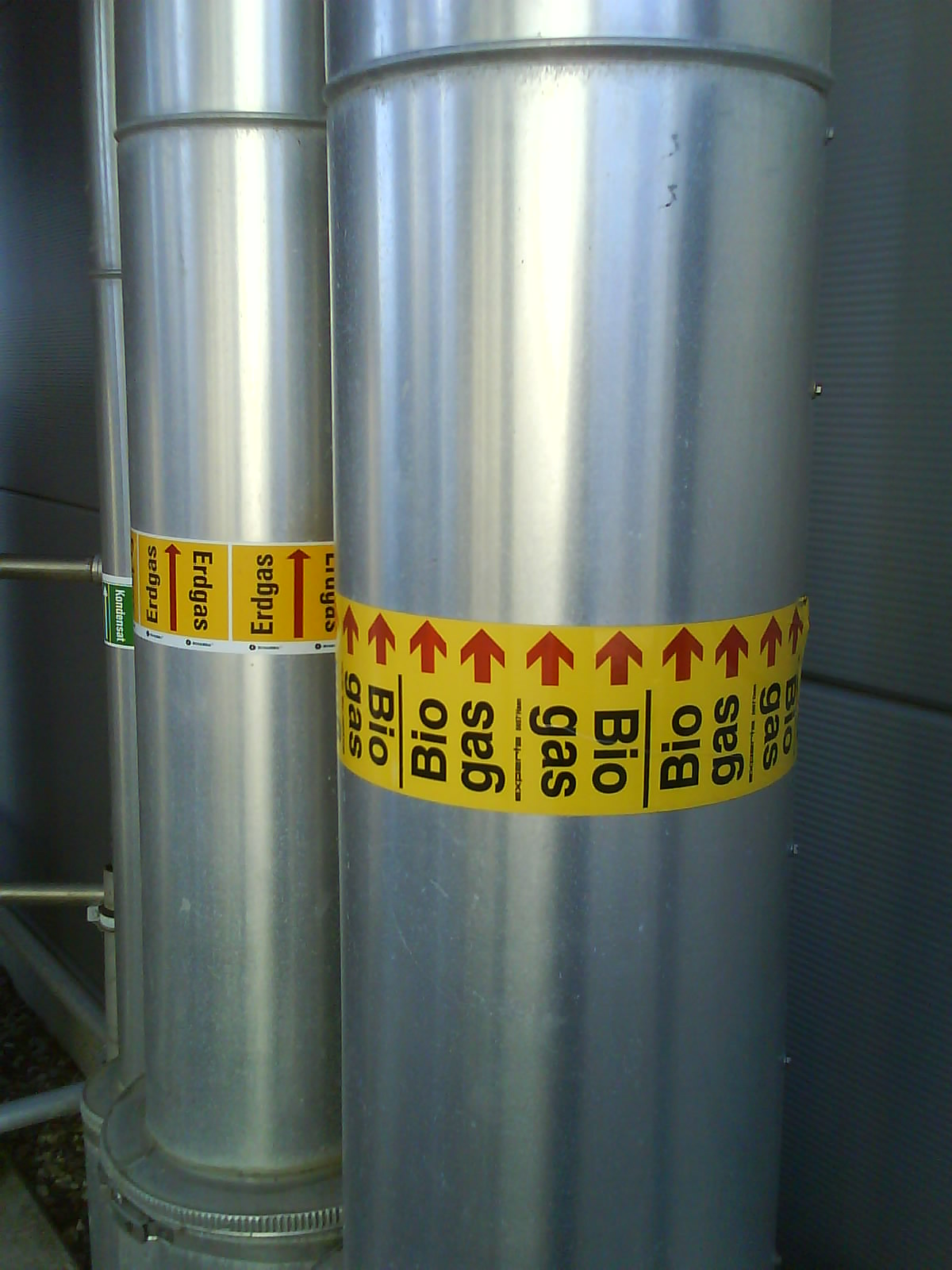
Biogas carrying pipes

Biogas is the ultimate waste product of the microbes feeding off the input biodegradable feedstock and is mostly methane and carbon dioxide, with a small amount of hydrogen (H_{2}), water vapor (H_{2}O, amount depending on temperature), and trace hydrogen sulfide (H_{2}S). Most of the biogas is produced during the middle of the digestion, after the bacterial population has grown, and tapers off as the putrescible material is exhausted. The gas is normally stored on top of the digester in an inflatable gas bubble or extracted and stored next to the facility in a gas holder.

The methane in biogas can be burned to produce both heat and electricity, usually with a reciprocating engine or microturbine, often in a cogeneration arrangement where the electricity and waste heat generated are used to warm the digesters or to heat buildings. Excess electricity can be sold to suppliers or put into the local grid. Electricity produced by anaerobic digesters is considered to be renewable energy and may attract subsidies. Biogas does not contribute to increasing atmospheric carbon dioxide concentrations because the gas is not released directly into the atmosphere and the carbon dioxide comes from an organic source with a short carbon cycle.

Biogas may require treatment or "scrubbing" to refine it for use as a fuel. Hydrogen sulfide, a toxic product formed from sulfates in the feedstock, is released as a trace component of the biogas. National environmental enforcement agencies, such as the U.S. Environmental Protection Agency or the English and Welsh Environment Agency, put strict limits on the levels of gases containing hydrogen sulfide; if the levels of hydrogen sulfide in the gas are high, then gas scrubbing and cleaning equipment (such as amine gas treating) will be needed to process the biogas to within regionally accepted levels. Alternatively, the addition of ferrous chloride (FeCl_{2}) to the digestion tanks inhibits hydrogen sulfide production.

Volatile siloxanes can also contaminate the biogas; such compounds are frequently found in household waste and wastewater. In digestion facilities accepting these materials as a component of the feedstock, low-molecular-weight siloxanes volatilise into biogas. When this gas is combusted in a gas engine, turbine, or boiler, siloxanes are converted into silicon dioxide (SiO_{2}), which deposits internally in the machine, increasing wear and tear. Practical and cost-effective technologies to remove siloxanes and other biogas contaminants are available at the present time. In certain applications, in situ treatment can be used to increase the methane purity by reducing the offgas carbon dioxide content, purging the majority of it in a secondary reactor.

In countries such as Switzerland, Germany, and Sweden, the methane in the biogas may be compressed for it to be used as a vehicle fuel or input directly into the gas mains. In countries where the drivers for the use of anaerobic digestion are renewable electricity subsidies, this route of treatment is less likely, as energy is required in this processing stage and reduces the overall levels available to sell.

=== Digestate ===
Digestate is the non-gaseous product of a digester. It consists of remnants of the original input material to the digesters that the microbes cannot use and the mineralised remains of the dead bacteria from within the digesters. The acidogenic and methanogenic steps each produce a digestate product, which are fibrous and liquid respectively. In two-stage systems, different forms of digestate come from different digestion tanks. In single-stage digestion systems, the two fractions appear combined into a sludge and, if desired, can be separated by further processing.

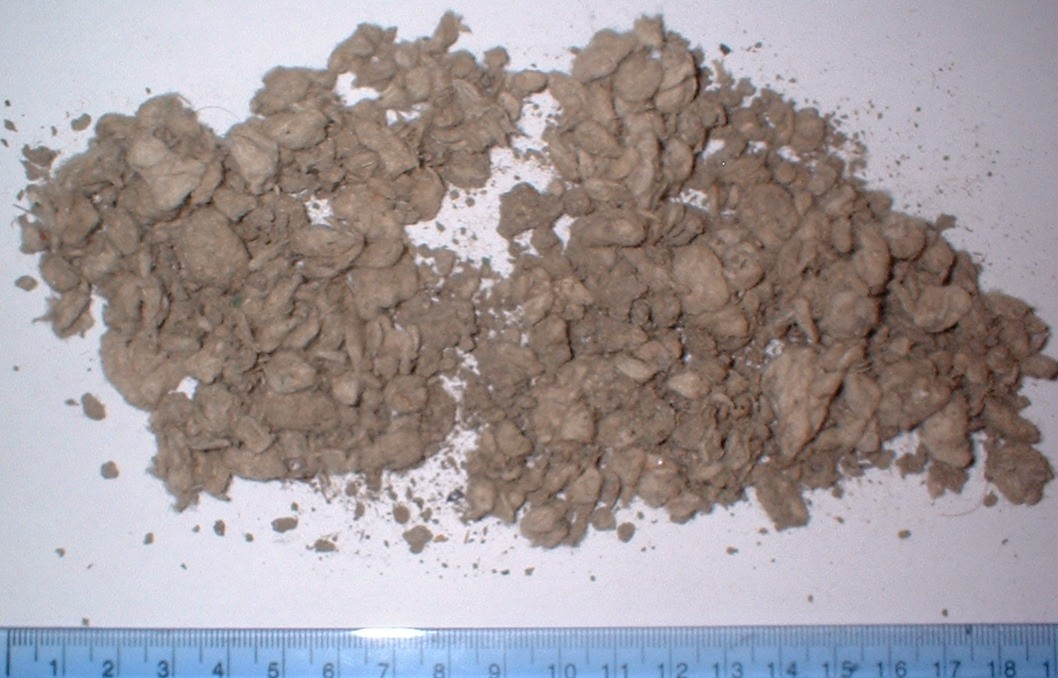
Acidogenic anaerobic digestate

The acidogenic digestate is a stable, organic, fibrous material consisting largely of lignin and cellulose, but also of a variety of mineral components in a matrix of dead bacterial cells; some plastic may also be present. The material resembles domestic compost and can be used as such. It can also be used as a lignocellulosic biomass to make low-grade building products such as fibreboard or as feedstock for ethanol production.

The methanogenic digestate is a liquid rich in plant nutrients (nitrogen as ammonium and potassium), which can be used as a fertiliser, depending on the quality of the material being digested. Levels of potentially toxic elements (PTEs) should be chemically assessed. This will depend upon the quality of the original feedstock. In the case of most clean and source-separated biodegradable waste streams, the levels of PTEs will be low. In the case of wastes originating from industry, the levels of PTEs may be higher and will need to be taken into consideration when determining a suitable end use for the material.

Acidogenic digestate typically contains biopolymers, such as lignin, that cannot be broken down by the anaerobic microorganisms. Methanogenic digestate may contain ammonia at phytotoxic levels and may hamper the growth of plants if used as a soil amendment. For these two reasons, a maturation or composting stage may be employed after digestion. Lignin and other materials are available for degradation by aerobic microorganisms such as fungi. During maturation, ammonia is oxidized into nitrates, which improves the fertility of the material as a soil amendment. In addition, composting leads to significant mass loss (primarily through evaporation), reducing the amount of material that needs to be trucked off-site. Composting is often used in dry digesters, as wet digesters require bulking with wood products or other material to be compostable. As most digesters are unable to degrade compostable packaging, secondary composting is required for this sort of packaging to be processed in an anaerobic digester.

=== Wastewater ===
The final output from anaerobic digestion systems is water, which originates both from the moisture content of the original waste that was treated and water produced during the microbial reactions in the digestion systems. This water may be released from the dewatering of the digestate or may be implicitly separate from the digestate.

The wastewater exiting the anaerobic digestion facility will typically have elevated levels of biochemical oxygen demand (BOD) and chemical oxygen demand (COD). These measures of the reactivity of the effluent indicate an ability to pollute. Some of this material is termed "hard COD", meaning it cannot be accessed by the anaerobic bacteria for conversion into biogas. If this effluent were put directly into watercourses, it would negatively affect them by causing eutrophication. As such, further treatment of the wastewater is often required. This treatment will typically be an oxidation stage wherein air is passed through the water in a sequencing batch reactors or reverse osmosis unit.

== History ==
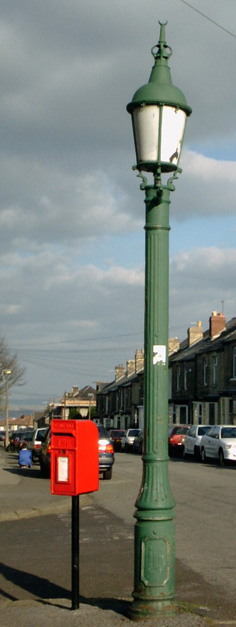
Gas street lamp

Reported scientific interest in the manufacturing of gas produced by the natural decomposition of organic matter dates from the 17th century, when Robert Boyle (1627–1691) and Stephen Hales (1677–1761) noted that disturbing the sediment of streams and lakes released flammable gas. In 1778, the Italian physicist Alessandro Volta (1745–1827), the father of electrochemistry, scientifically identified that gas as methane.

In 1808 Sir Humphry Davy proved the presence of methane in the gases produced by cattle manure. The first known anaerobic digester was built in 1859 at a leper colony in Bombay in India. In 1895, the technology was developed in Exeter, England, where a septic tank was used to generate gas for the sewer gas destructor lamp, a type of gas lighting. Also in England, in 1904, the first dual-purpose tank for both sedimentation and sludge treatment was installed in Hampton, London.

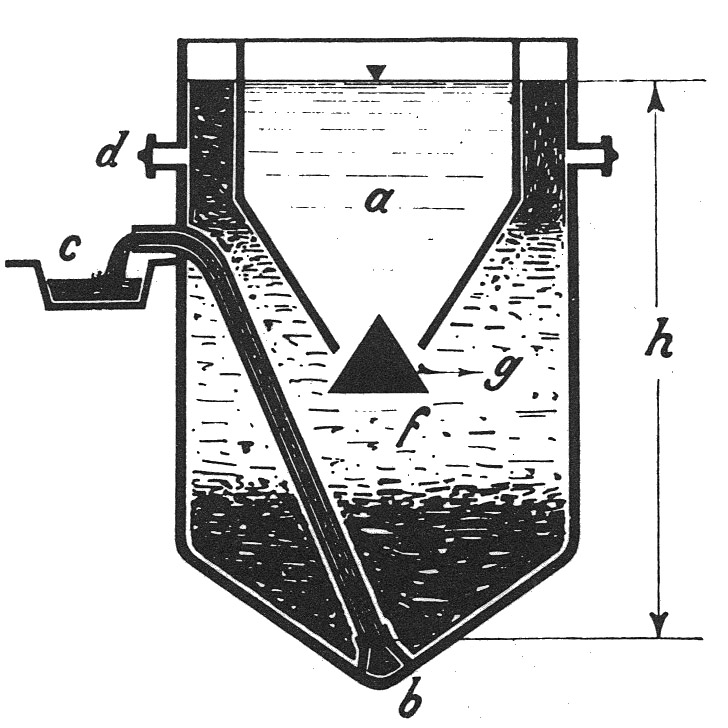
Imhoff tank

By the early 20th century, anaerobic digestion systems began to resemble the technology as it appears today. In 1906, Karl Imhoff created the Imhoff tank, an early form of anaerobic digester and model wastewater treatment system throughout the early 20th century. After 1920, closed-tank systems began to replace the previously common use of anaerobic lagoons – covered earthen basins used to treat volatile solids. Research on anaerobic digestion began in earnest in the 1930s.

Around the time of World War I, production from biofuels slowed as petroleum production increased and its uses were identified. While fuel shortages during World War II re-popularized anaerobic digestion, interest in the technology decreased again after the war ended. Similarly, the 1970s energy crisis sparked interest in anaerobic digestion. During the 1970s energy crisis, interest in small-scale and rural anaerobic digestion systems increased internationally. In India, engineer Dr. Ram Bux Singh developed and promoted early gobar gas (biogas) plants and contributed to the dissemination of anaerobic digestion technology for rural energy applications. His work was also referenced in publications such as Mother Earth News, which described him as “perhaps the father of methane development in the United States” during early biogas experimentation efforts. In addition to high energy prices, factors affecting the adoption of anaerobic digestion systems include receptivity to innovation, pollution penalties, policy incentives, and the availability of subsidies and funding opportunities.

=== Modern geographical distribution ===
Today, anaerobic digesters are commonly found alongside farms to reduce nitrogen runoff from manure, or wastewater treatment facilities to reduce the costs of sludge disposal. Agricultural anaerobic digestion for energy production has become most popular in Germany, where there were 8,625 digesters in 2014. In the United Kingdom, there were 259 facilities by 2014, and 500 projects planned to become operational by 2019. In the United States, there were 191 operational plants across 34 states in 2012. Policy may explain why adoption rates are so different across these countries.

Feed-in tariffs in Germany were enacted in 1991, also known as FIT, providing long-term contracts compensating investments in renewable energy generation. Consequently, between 1991 and 1998 the number of anaerobic digester plants in Germany grew from 20 to 517. In the late 1990s, energy prices in Germany varied and investors became unsure of the market's potential. The German government responded by amending FIT four times between 2000 and 2011, increasing tariffs and improving the profitability of anaerobic digestion, and resulting in reliable returns for biogas production and continued high adoption rates across the country.

=== Incidents involving digesters ===
Anaerobic digesters have caused fish kills (e.g. River Mole, Devon, River Teifi, Afon Llynfi) and loss of human life (e.g. Avonmouth explosion).

There have been explosions of anaerobic digesters in the US (Pixelle Specialty Solutions' Androscoggin Mill in Jay, Maine; Pensacola (Cantonment) on 22 January 2017; March 2013 in Aumsville, Oregon; 6 February 1987 in Pennsylvania; Southwest Wastewater Treatment Plant in Springfield, Missouri), in the UK (for example at Avonmouth and at Harper Adams College, Newport, Shropshire), plus In Europe, there were about 800 accidents on biogas plants between 2005 and 2015, such as in France (Saint-Fargeau) (though few of them were "serious" with direct consequences for the human population). Fortunately, according to one source, "less than a dozen of them had consequences on humans" – for example, the incident at Rhadereistedt, Germany (4 dead).

Safety analyses have included a 2016 study compiled a database of 169 accidents involving ADs.

== See also ==
- Anaerobic digester types
- Anaerobic organism
- Avonmouth explosion
- Bioconversion of biomass to mixed alcohol fuels
- Carbon dioxide air capture
- Comparison of anaerobic and aerobic digestion
- Environmental issues with energy
- Global Methane Initiative
- Hypoxia (environmental)
- Methane capture
- Microbiology of decomposition
- Pasteur point
- Relative cost of electricity generated by different sources
- Sanitation
- Sewage treatment
- Upflow anaerobic sludge blanket digestion (UASB)
