= List of homeopaths =

The following people are recognized as notable homeopaths, either historically or currently:

- J. Ellis Barker (1870–1948)
- C. L. Blood (born ca. 1834), patent medicine businessman
- Clemens Maria Franz von Bönninghausen (1785–1864)
- Samuel Cockburn (1823–1915), homeopathic surgeon and author based in Glasgow, Scotland
- Hawley Harvey Crippen (1862–1910)
- Peter Fisher (1950–2018)
- John Franklin Gray (1804–1882), the first practitioner of Homeopathy in the United States
- Melanie Hahnemann (1800–1878), wife of Samuel Hahnemann
- Samuel Hahnemann (1755–1843), founder of homeopathy
- Charles Julius Hempel, father of English homeopathic literature
- Constantine Hering (1800–1880), first president of the American Institute of Homeopathy
- Elizabeth Wright Hubbard (1896–1967)
- George Heinrich Gottlieb Jahr (1800–1875), pioneer of classical homeopathy
- James Tyler Kent (1849–1916)
- Semyon Korsakov (1787 – 1853 OS) Russian homeopath and inventor, originator of Korsakovian method of dilution
- Katherine Kurt (1852-1910), American homeopath and temperance activist
- E. B. Nash (1838–1917)
- Frederic Hervey Foster Quin (1799–1878), the first homeopathic physician in England
- Guy Beckley Stearns (1870–1947), American homeopath and author
- George Vithoulkas (born 1932)
