= Susquehannock Trail System =

Long-distance hiking trail in the United States

Coordinates: 41.663°N 77.825°W

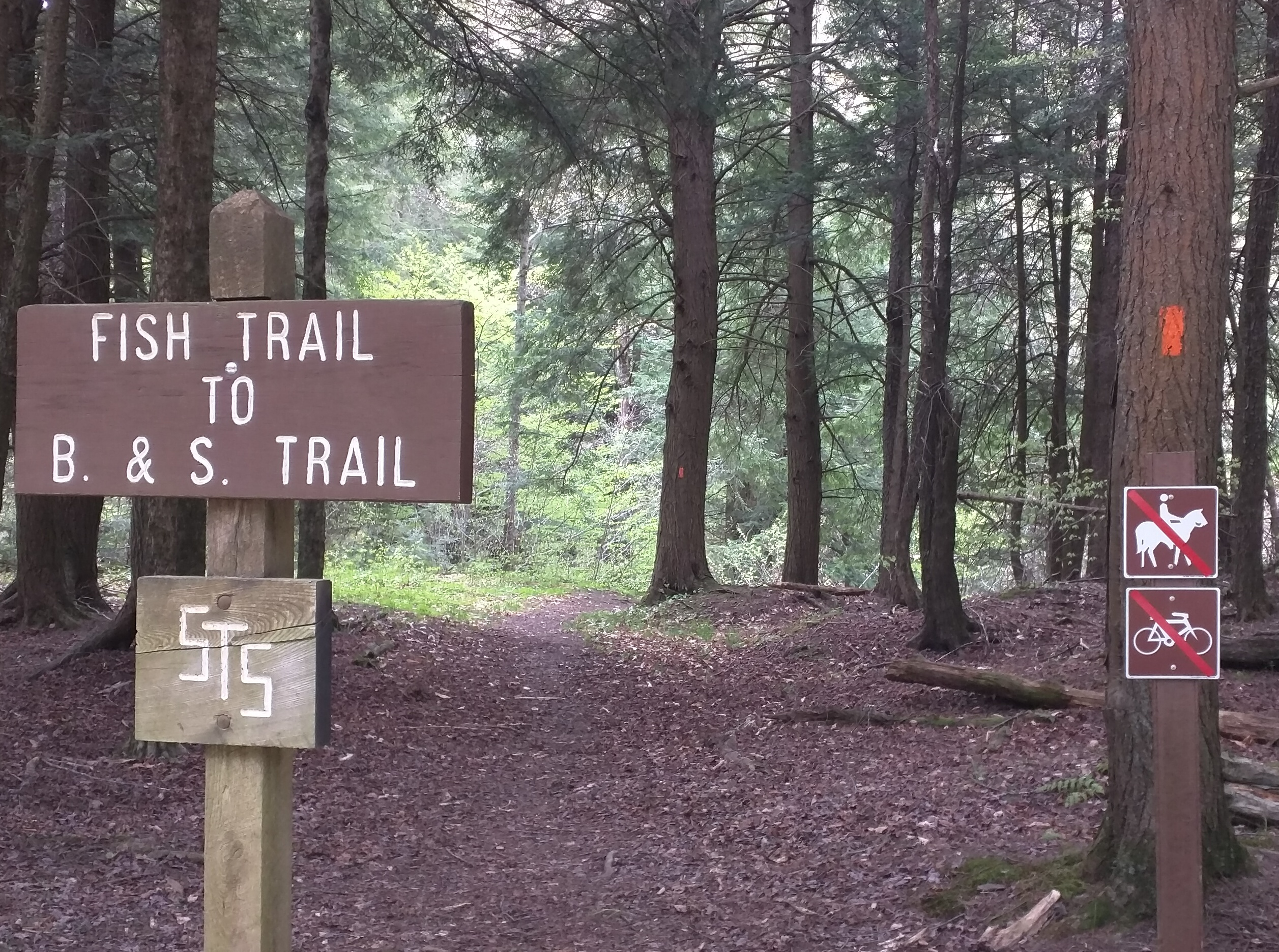
- A segment of the Susquehannock Trail System (STS) that follows the former Fish Trail
- Length: 83.4 mi (134.2 km)
- Location: Potter and Clinton Counties, Pennsylvania, United States
- Established: 1966
- Trailheads: Northern Gateway: Susquehannock State Forest headquarters on U.S. Route 6 Southern Gateway: Ole Bull State Park on Pennsylvania Route 144
- Use: Hiking, some areas allow cross-country skiing
- Elevation change: High
- Difficulty: Strenuous
- Season: Year round
- Hazards: Uneven and wet terrain, rattlesnakes, mosquitoes, ticks, black bears

The Susquehannock Trail System (STS) is an 83.4-mile (134.2 km) loop hiking trail in Susquehannock State Forest in Potter County (with a few short segments in Clinton County) in north-central Pennsylvania, United States. The trail walks through two state parks and passes near three more state parks. It also traverses Hammersley Wild Area, the largest area in Pennsylvania without a road. The loop is supplemented by two cross-connector trails, several short access trails, a shared path with the Donut Hole Trail, and two connectors to the Black Forest Trail. The STS is the oldest backpacking trail in Pennsylvania, and has been noted for its solitude while traversing remote areas with few signs of civilization. The STS also includes several overnight shelters.

== History ==
The Susquehannock Trail System was founded in 1966 by William Fish Jr., who suggested creating an extensive backpacking loop through remote areas of Potter County by combining several pre-existing footpaths and logging roads or railroads, with some new connectors. The loop was completed in 1969; a volunteer organization called Susquehannock Trail Club was formed at the time and continues to maintain the trail. The trail has "System" in its official name because the names of many of the earlier trails that were incorporated into the loop have been retained for their historical interest.

== Route ==
The Susquehannock Trail System is traditionally described in the clockwise direction. Many hikers begin at the "Northern Gateway" at the Susquehannock State Forest headquarters on U.S. Route 6 between the villages of Sweden Valley and Walton in Sweden Township. The main STS loop does not reach this point; instead the hiker follows a short access trail for 0.4 mile to reach the main STS loop. To continue on the main loop, the hiker will proceed eastbound from this junction. The STS begins with a mostly level hike on top of the Allegheny Plateau, and for about the first 2.5 miles it encounters several side trails that lead to Denton Hill State Park. At 3.9 miles the STS begins its first significant elevation change with a descent into Jacob Hollow.

At 6.6 miles the STS crosses a long volunteer-built suspension over Lyman Run, climbs steeply, and passes a junction with a side trail that leads 1.5 miles to Lyman Run State Park. The STS passes an old dynamite shed, which has been converted into a small hiker's shelter, at 10.5 miles then reaches the valley of the West Branch of Pine Creek. At 11.1 miles, the STS passes a junction with the West Branch Trail, a cross-connector that leads 6.1 miles to the west side of the main loop. The STS then begins a steep ascent, nicknamed the "Cardiac Climb", back to the top of the Allegheny Plateau. At 13.5 miles the trail briefly jogs on PA Route 44 and passes an old fire tower and foreman's cabin.

The STS then descends into the extensive canyon system formed by Cross Fork Creek. At 14.2 miles it passes a junction with the East Fork Trail, a cross-connector that leads 8.3 miles to the west side of the main loop. At 20.6 miles the STS crosses another volunteer-built suspension bridge, then climbs back to the top of the plateau. After a short road walk on top of the plateau, the trail descends steeply into Ole Bull State Park, which is often called the trail's "Southern Gateway". The trail uses the park's footbridge over Kettle Creek and then crosses PA Route 144 at 26.5 miles. The STS climbs very steeply to the top of the plateau again. A secluded area called "Spook Hollow", due to its dense tree cover and cooler temperatures, is reached at 30.8 miles. After leveling off on high ground, the trail passes a junction with the North Link Trail at 31.9 miles and another with the South Link Trail at 34.2 miles; both of those lead east to the Black Forest Trail.

At 35.6 miles, the STS reaches its first junction with the Donut Hole Trail; the two trails are concurrent for the next 8.6 miles. The trail descends very steeply, crosses a high footbridge called Ted's Truss (in honor of a state forester) over a branch of Young Womans Creek at 36.9 miles, and climbs to the top of the plateau again. After several miles on top of the plateau, the STS plunges again into the town of Cross Fork, reaching a side street at 49.0 miles, then crossing Cross Fork Creek again on a street bridge and encountering PA Route 144 for the second time. The STS climbs steeply again, enters Hammersley Wild Area, and begins a long walk alongside Hammersley Fork Creek at 54.4 miles. After another plunge off of the plateau, the trail walks through a semi-developed area alongside the East Fork of Sinnemahoning Creek starting at 63.4 miles.

The STS then climbs to the top of the plateau yet again, and at 71.7 miles passes a junction with a short trail that leads west to the dilapidated Prouty Place State Park. The STS traverses several rugged side canyons, passes the western end of the East Fork Trail (cross-connector) at 73.9 miles, and walks through Patterson State Park at 76.7 miles. The trail crosses PA Route 44 for the second time at the edge of the state park, descends to the valley of the West Branch of Pine Creek for the second time, and passes the west end of the West Branch Trail (cross-connector) at 77.7 miles. At 80.4 miles, the STS reaches the unusual Splash Dam Hollow, a wide and treeless valley occupying the bed of a former artificial lake believed to have formed from an old man-made splash dam; some local historians believe it may have been a beaver dam. The STS then makes a final extensive climb back to the top of the Allegheny Plateau, and reaches the end of the loop at 83.4 miles. The "Northern Gateway" at the Susquehannock State Forest office is 0.4 mile to the west via the aforementioned access trail.
