= Twomile Run =

Tributary of Kettle Creek in Clinton County, Pennsylvania

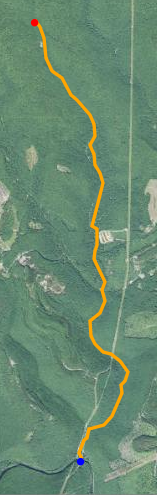
- Satellite map of Twomile Run. The red dot is the source and the blue dot is the mouth.

Physical characteristics
- Source
  - location: Sproul State Forest in Leidy Township, Clinton County, Pennsylvania
  - elevation: 1,700 ft (520 m)
- Mouth
  - location: Kettle Creek in Noyes Township, Clinton County, Pennsylvania
  - coordinates: 41°18′53″N 77°51′31″W
  - elevation: 705 ft (215 m)
- Length: 4.5 mi (7.2 km)
- Basin size: 9.15 sq mi (23.7 km^{2})
- Discharge
  - average: 200 to 10,000 US gallons per minute (0.45 to 22.28 cu ft/s; 0.013 to 0.631 m^{3}/s)

Basin features
- Progression: Twomile Run; Kettle Creek; West Branch Susquehanna River; Susquehanna River; Chesapeake Bay
- Tributaries
  - left: Middle Branch Twomile Run, Huling Branch
  - right: Robbins Hollow

Twomile Run is a tributary of Kettle Creek in Clinton County, Pennsylvania, in the United States. It is 4.5 miles (7.2 km) long. Tributaries of the stream include Huling Branch and Middle Branch Twomile Run. The stream flows through Leidy Township and Noyes Township. The stream's watershed has an area of approximately 9 square miles. Coal is mined in the watershed. Most of the acid mine drainage in Kettle Creek comes from Twomile Run.

The discharge of Twomile Run at its mouth ranges from 200 to 10,000 gallons per minute. There are 2.1 to 11.7 milligrams per liter of manganese in the waters at this location. In 2007, the average pH at the mouth of the stream was 3.52, with a range of 3.4 to 3.9. By 2011, the stream's pH had increased slightly upstream of Huling Branch. Rock formations in the watershed include the Huntley Mountain Formation, the Burgoon Sandstone, the Allegheny Group, and the Pottsville Group.

== Course ==
Twomile Run begins in Sproul State Forest in Leidy Township, Clinton County. The stream flows south and slightly east, leaving Sproul State Forest and Leidy Township and then entering Noyes Township. Soon after entering Noyes Township, it receives the tributary Middle Branch Twomle Run and continues south. The Twomile Run valley begins to get deeper at this point. The stream turns southwest, then southeast, and then southwest again. Shortly after the final bend, it receives the tributary Huling Branch and not long afterwards enters Kettle Creek.

=== Tributaries ===
Named tributaries of Twomile Run include Middle Branch Twomile Run and Huling Branch. Robbins Hollow joins Twomile Run 100 feet (30 m) downstream of Middle Branch Twomile Run. Huling Branch has an unnamed tributary of its own and is significantly longer than Middle Branch Twomile Run, about the same length as Twomile Run. Other tributaries of Twomile Run include Pecking Patch Hollow and MackIntosh Hollow.

== Hydrology ==
The watershed of Twomile Run experiences significant acid mine drainage, with 2.3 miles (3.7 km) of the stream being affected by it. The acid mine drainage flows in the watershed have a pH of 2.5 to 3.5, an iron concentration of 20 to 50 milligrams per liter, and an aluminum concentration of 20 to 70 milligrams per liter. The acidity concentration in these flows ranges from 200 to 600 milligrams per liter. The stream is the only significant source of acid mine drainage to enter Kettle Creek on its eastern side.

Thirty to fifty percent of the acid mine drainage in the Twomile Run watershed comes from baseflow.

Above the swamp on Twomile Run, the discharge of the stream is 511 gallons per minute. Upstream of Middle Branch Twomile Run, the discharge is 618 gallons per minute and downstream of Robbins Hollow, the discharge is 1402 gallons per minute. Downstream of the sampling site KC121, (Note: A drainage from the west at 41.330555°N 77.85833°W) the discharge is 1893 gallons per minute and upstream of Huling Branch, the discharge is 2258 gallons per minute. The discharge at the mouth of Twomile Run ranges from 200 to 10,000 gallons per minute, which is between 0.6 and 2 percent of the discharge of Kettle Creek.

Upstream of the swamp on the stream, the daily load of iron is 0.9 pounds (0.41 kg) and the load is 7.6 pounds (3.4 kg) per day upstream of Middle Branch Twomile Run. Downstream of Robbins Hollow, the daily iron load is 25.2 pounds (11.4 kg) per day and downstream of KC121, it is 37.9 pounds (17.2 kg) per day.

The load of aluminum above the swamp on Twomile Run is 2.7 pounds (1.2 kg) and the load is 21.0 pounds (9.5 kg) per day upstream of the stream's middle branch. Below Robbins Hollow, the load is 51.0 pounds (23.1 kg) per day and below KC121, the daily load is 67.5 pounds (30.6 kg). Downstream of Huling Branch, the daily load is 85.4 pounds (38.7 kg).

The manganese concentration at the mouth of Twomile Run ranges from 2.1 to 11.7 milligrams per liter. The average concentration is 5.6 milligrams per liter. Upstream of Middle Branch Twomile Run, the concentration is 6.83 milligrams per liter and the daily load is 57.0 pounds (25.9 kg). Above Pecking Patch Hollow, the concentration of manganese is 6.43 milligrams per liter and the daily load is 119.2 pounds (54.1 kg). Downstream of Huling Branch, the manganese concentration is 6.44 milligrams per liter and the load is 296.0 pounds (134.3 kg) per day.

The daily load of acid above the swamp on Twomile Run is 17 pounds (7.7 kg). The load of acid above Middle Branch Twomile Run is 205 pounds (93 kg) per day. Below Robbins Hollow, the daily load is 468 pounds (212 kg); below KC121, the load is 701 pounds (318 kg) per day. Downstream of Huling Branch, the daily load is 957 pounds (434 kg) per day. The pH of Twomile Run at its mouth ranged from 3.4 to 3.9 and the average pH at this location was 3.52 in 2007. However, by 2011, the pH upstream of Huling Branch had increased by 0.4 and the acidity concentration of Twomile Branch had halved. The alkalinity concentration in Twomile Run above Middle Branch Twomile Run is 0.37 milligrams per liter and the daily load is 3.1 pounds (1.4 kg). The concentration of alkalinity in Twomile Run upstream of Pecking Patch Hollow is 1.03 milligrams per liter. The daily load is 19.2 pounds (8.7 kg) at this location. There is no alkalinity downstream of Huling Branch.

The sulfate load upstream of the swamp on Twomile Run is 51 pounds (23 kg) per day and upstream of Middle Branch Twomile Run, the daily load is 1,207 pounds (547 kg). Downstream of Robbins Hollow and KC121, the sulfate load is 2,472 pounds (1,121 kg) and 2,326 pounds (1,055 kg) per day, respectively. Below Huling Branch, the load is 3,433 pounds (1,557 kg) per day.

The sediment load in the Twomile Run watershed is 0.38 pounds (0.17 kg) per acre per year. The phosphorus and nitrogen loads are less than 0.5 pounds (0.23 kg) per acre per year and 2.30 pounds (1.04 kg) per acre per year, respectively.

The conductivity of Twomile Run at its mouth ranges from 291 micro-Siemens to 1091 micro-Siemens, with an average of 663 micro-Siemens.

== Geography, geology, and climate ==
There are a number of surface mines and deep mine complexes in the Twomile Run watershed. Some of the deep mine complexes extend into adjacent watersheds.

There are several rock formations in the Twomile Run watershed which are visible on the surface. These include the Huntley Mountain Formation, the Burgoon Sandstone, the Pottsville Group and the Allegheny Group. The Huntley Mountain Formation is from Devonian and Mississippian times and the Burgoon Sandstone is from Mississippian times. The other two formations are both from the Pennsylvanian times. The Upper Kittanning and Lower Kittanning coal seams are found in hills with the Allegheny Group. The Pottsville Group also contains coal seams. The elevation of the Upper Kittanning coal seam in the watershed ranges from 1,340 feet (410 m) to 1,600 feet (490 m) in the ridge between Middle Branch Twomile Run and Huling Branch.

The watershed of Twomile Run runs in approximately the same direction as the nearby Clearfield-McIntyre Syncline. To the north of the Clearfield-McIntyre Syncline is the Wellsboro Anticline and to the south is the Hyner Dome. The Huling Branch valley is relatively straight and narrow.

The elevation of Twomile Run at its source is 1,700 feet (520 m), while the elevation at its mouth is 705 feet (215 m). The first acid mine drainage discharge is at 1,240 feet (380 m). The maximum elevation in the watershed is 2,204 feet (672 m). The average basin slope is 8.32 degrees.

At 140 feet (43 m) to 150 feet (46 m) white and orange metal precipitate forms on the banks of Twomile Run at its confluence with Kettle Creek because the waters of the former stream are acidic, while those of the latter are alkaline.

The velocity-depth of Twomile Run is low, but there is an adequate frequency of riffles in the stream. The right bank of the stream is somewhat unstable.

Between 1992 and 2005, the annual precipitation ranged from 30.8 inches (78 cm) to 51.2 inches (130 cm) at the nearby Alvin R. Bush Dam. The average rate of precipitation was 36.2 inches (92 cm) per year.

== Watershed ==
The watershed of Twomile Run has an area of 9.15 square miles. There are 16.6 miles (26.7 km) of streams in the watershed, of which 8.5 miles (13.7 km) are affected by acid mine drainage. Most of the watershed is forested land. However, there are some areas of grassland, parking areas, and roads. The watershed runs in a northeast–southwest direction.

Most of the land in the watershed is owned by the Pennsylvania Department of Conservation and Natural Resources, the Bureau of Forestry, and Sproul State Forest. There are some agricultural lands in the watershed, most of which are in the vicinity of Huling Branch.

Roads in the Twomile Run watershed include Two Mile Run Road. There are between 15 and 20 stream crossings in the stream's watershed.

Twomile Run, Huling Branch, and Middle Branch Twomile Run all have floodplains in their upper reaches.

== History and industries ==
The first coal mines in the Twomile Run watershed were deep mines, but there are no surviving maps of them. Surface mining of the Lower Kittanning and Upper Kittanning coals began after World War II, with the Lower Kittanning coal being mined to a depth of 60 feet (18 m). By the 1970s, the surface mining had ended. Much of the coal mined in the entire Kettle Creek watershed was in the Twomile Run watershed.

In the 1930s and early 1940s, there was a Civilian Conservation Corps located in the Twomile Run watershed.

A draft for an Operation Scarlift report was written in 1973 for Kettle Creek (which Twomile Run is a tributary of), but was never approved. A number of passive treatment systems were installed in the tributary Robbins Hollow in 2004 and nine have been installed in the main stem.

Timber is produced in the watershed of Twomile Run. Some coal reserves remain in the watershed.

== Biology ==
Brook trout are found in the upper reaches of the tributary Middle Branch Twomile Run, upstream of the acid mine drainage discharges in its watershed. There are brook trout above the acid mine drainage discharges on Twomile Run, but none below the discharges. The brook trout population is considered to be a "Class A population" and is increasing.

The concentration of brook trout at one location on the tributary Huling Branch is 24.9 kilograms (55 lb) per hectare and at another location the concentration is 13.9 kilograms (31 lb) per hectare.

The confluence of Twomile Run with Kettle Creek was completely devoid of fish in 1967, but by 1997, the Pennsylvania Fish and Boat Commission observed two species of fish, white sucker and smallmouth bass in this location. Twomile Run has the highest potential fish biodiversity of all streams in the Kettle Creek watershed, with a Potential Species Richness of 232 to 241 in places.

Plecoptera, Trichoptera, Odonata, and Coleoptera have all been observed on Huling Branch. The stonefly and caddisfly populations on Middle Branch Twomile Run are increasing.

The confluences of Middle Branch Twomile Run and Huling Branch with Twomile Run were considered to be "poor" or "marginal" habitats by the Pennsylvania Department of Environmental Protection in 2001. The Pennsylvania Fish and Boat Commission assessed the mouth of the stream as 2 out of 10 on their habitability scale in the same year.

== Recreation ==
Most of the land in the Twomile Run watershed is used for recreation. Deer hunting and bear hunting are often done in the area. There is also a series all-terrain vehicle trails known collectively as the Whiskey Springs ATV trail complex. These are located in the sub-watersheds of Huling Branch and Middle Branch Twomile Run.

== See also ==
- Cross Fork
- Hammersley Fork
- List of rivers of Pennsylvania
