= Hammersley Wild Area =

Protected area in Pennsylvania, USA

- IUCN category III (natural monument or feature)
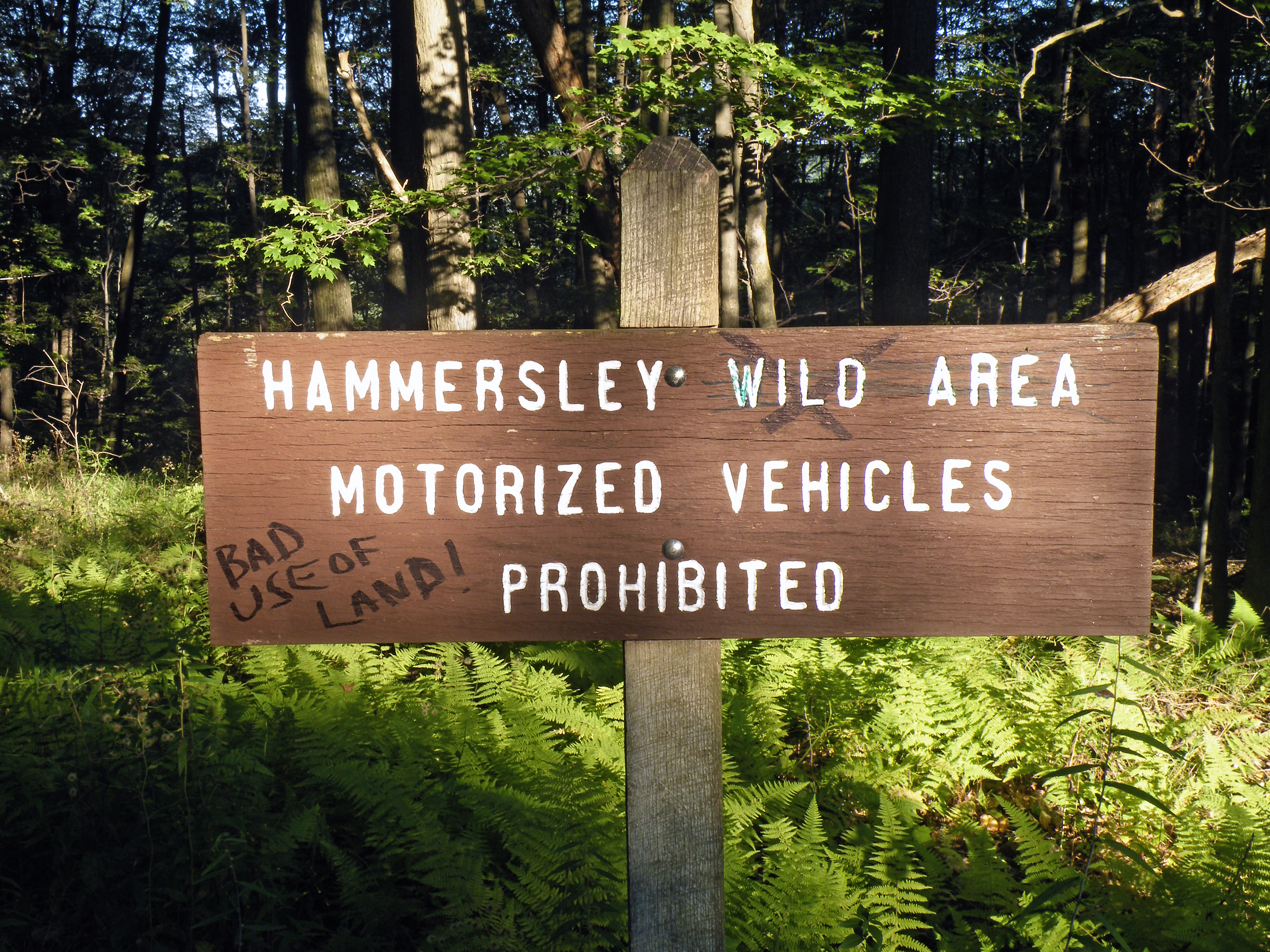

- Location within Pennsylvania
- Location: Potter and Clinton, Pennsylvania, United States
- Coordinates: 41°30′47″N 77°52′48″W
- Area: 30,253 acres (122.43 km^{2})
- Established: 2004
- Named for: Hammersley Fork, a tributary of Kettle Creek
- Governing body: Pennsylvania Department of Conservation and Natural Resources

Hammersley Wild Area is a 30,253-acre (12,243 ha) wild area in the Susquehannock State Forest in Potter and Clinton counties in north-central Pennsylvania in the United States. It is the largest area without a road in Pennsylvania and the state's second largest wild area (the first being Quehanna Wild Area). The wild area is named for Hammersley Fork, a tributary of Kettle Creek, which flows through the area. The wild area includes 10.78 miles (17.35 km) of the Susquehannock Trail System, an 83.4-mile (134.2 km) loop hiking trail almost entirely on state forest land.

The Hammersley Wild Area was last clearcut around 1900 and is a mature second growth forest today. The 1,521 acres (616 ha) Forrest H. Duttlinger Natural Area is adjacent to the southwest corner of the wild area in Clinton County, and it contains 160 acres (65 ha) of old-growth forest, mostly Eastern Hemlock. The Hammersley Wild Area has been called "one of the state forest system’s jewels" and "a true state treasure" by the Pennsylvania Audubon Society.

== History ==
The Hammersley Wild Area and Susquehannock State Forest are on the Allegheny Plateau, which was formed, along with the Appalachian Mountains in the Alleghenian orogeny, some 300 million years ago, when Gondwana (specifically what became Africa) and what became North America collided, forming Pangaea. Although the region appears mountainous, these are not true mountains: instead millions of years of erosion have made this a dissected plateau, causing the "mountainous" terrain seen today. The hardest of the ancient rocks are on top of the ridges, while the softer rocks eroded away, forming the valleys.

Almost all of Potter County and Pennsylvania were clearcut in the late 19th and early 20th centuries. In 1897 the Pennsylvania General Assembly passed legislation which authorized the purchase of "unseated lands for forest reservations" and the first Pennsylvania state forest lands were acquired the following year. The first land for the Susquehannock State Forest was acquired in 1901; the cost for the major acquisitions was an average of $2.50 per acre ($6.18/ha). The land that became Hammersley Wild Area was last clearcut around 1900. About the same time there were logging railroads throughout the area and a small town at the confluence of the Nelson Branch with the Hammersley Fork.

The Emporium Lumber Company sold the land which became the wild area to the state in the 1930s, but retained the mineral rights. During the Great Depression the Civilian Conservation Corps (CCC), a work relief program established in 1933 as part of President Franklin D. Roosevelt's New Deal legislation, operated ten CCC camps in the Susquehannock State Forest, of which eight were in Potter County. The young men of the CCC built roads and parks, fought forest fires, and planted trees. As of 2003, the Susquehannock State Forest covered 265,000 acres (107,000 ha), chiefly in Potter County with small tracts in Clinton and McKean counties.

The Hammersley Wild Area was officially established in January 2004 when the DCNR acquired the mineral rights and rights for natural gas and oil from Pennsylvania Power and Light and Pennsylvania General Energy, who had held them for 13,600 acres (5,500 ha) within the wild area. Prior to this acquisition, Hammersley was only a "proposed" wild area as gas and oil drilling were still possible. Pennsylvania has 16 wild areas totaling more than 145,000 acres (59,000 ha), all within its state forests; the individual wild areas are each generally larger than 3,000 acres (1,200 ha). Wild areas are protected from development and open to recreation, with "hiking, hunting, fishing, primitive backpack camping, horseback riding, bicycling and wildlife watching" allowed, but "new public access roads, motorized vehicles, mineral development and new rights-of-way are prohibited".

== Ecology and trails ==
The Hammersley Wild Area contains mature second growth forest in the Allegheny Highlands forests ecoregion, with a few acres of scattered old growth trees, mostly hemlocks 3 to 4 feet (0.91 to 1.22 m) in diameter. The DCNR has called the forests in the wild area "some of the best examples of mature woodland in the Commonwealth". There are white pine and hemlock stumps—left from the logging operations—which have become rooting sites for birch trees. In some parts of the wild area deer browsing has led to the extirpation of all small plants in the understory except inedible ferns, though other areas have a more diverse mixture of "hardwoods, hemlocks and pines". Despite its protected status as a wild area, there are two rights of way for buried natural gas pipelines which pass through the Hammersley: one across the southwest corner and through the Duttlinger Natural Area, the other running parallel to McConnell Road along the northwest edge of the area. There are also reports of illegal All Terrain Vehicle use in the southern part of the wild area. The wild area is home to white tailed deer, Great blue heron, beaver, and rattlesnakes.

The wild area is crossed by eight named hiking trails, many of which follow old railroad grades. The most well-known and best marked and maintained trails are part of the Susquehannock Trail System (STS), which uses the Hammersley, Elkhorn, and Twin Sisters trails here. The STS trail travels 10.78 miles (17.35 km) through the wild area, and is blazed with orange rectangles. It passes beaver meadows, stone bridge abutments from the lumber railroads, and apple trees said to have grown from apple cores discarded by lumberjacks. A popular spot on the trail is the Hammersley Pool, a waterfall and natural swimming area in the Hammersley Fork which has water "deep enough for swimming even in mid-summer". There are vistas on McConnel Road in the north and on the Twin Sisters Trail in the south, which passes through thickets of mountain laurel. Hazards on the trails include having to ford the streams in several places, encountering rattlesnakes, and becoming lost 5 miles (8.0 km) from any road. Other popular hikes are following the Hammersley Trail along the Hammersley Fork to its mouth on Kettle Creek for 10 miles (16 km) or starting at the mouth and then hiking into the old growth forest in the Dutlinger Natural Area for 2 miles (3.2 km).
