= Hammersley Fork =

Tributary in Kettle Creek, Pennsylvania

Hammersley Fork Hammersley Fork Creek
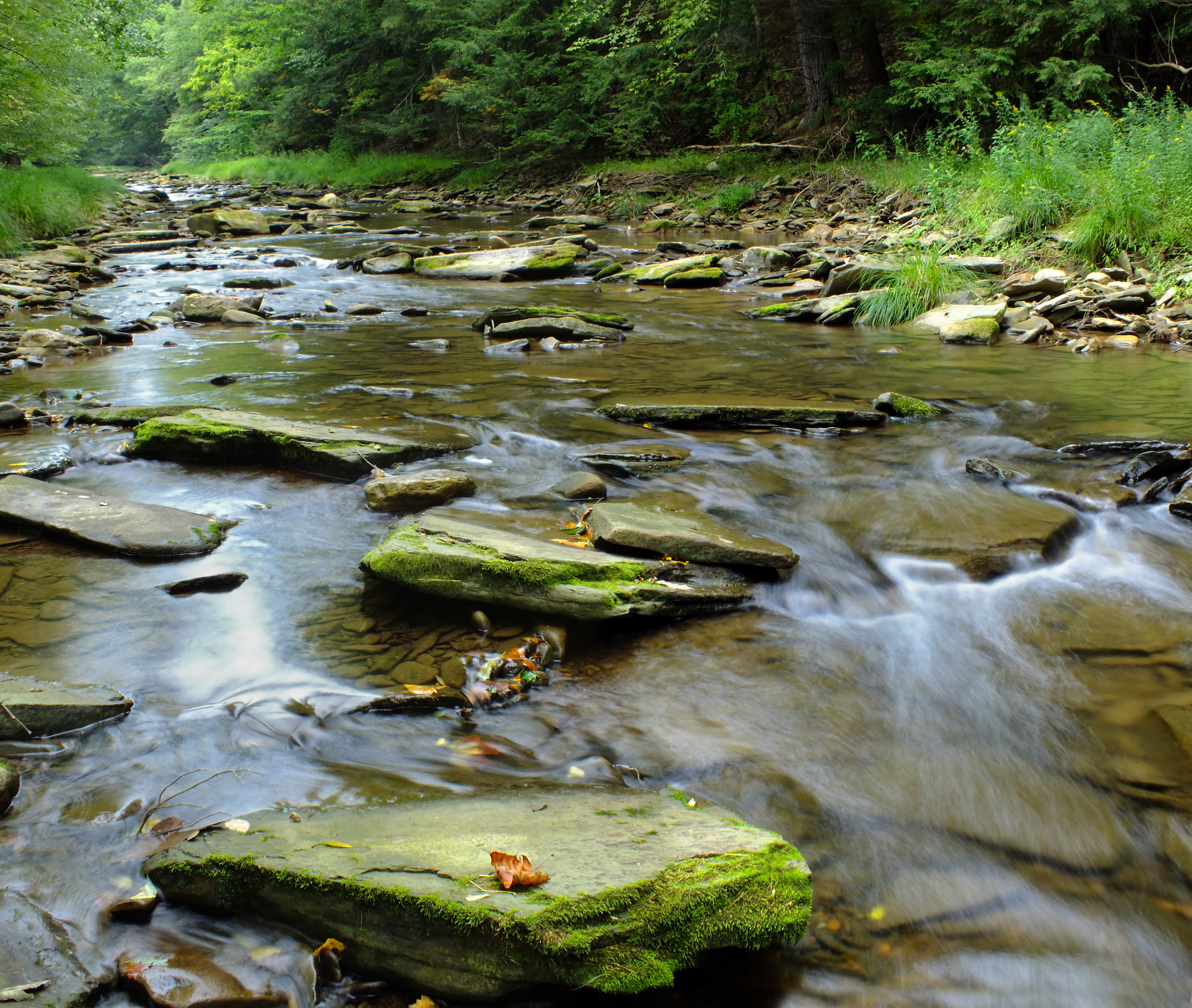
- Hammersley Fork

- Location of the mouth of Hammersely Fork in Pennsylvania
- Etymology: named after J.P. Hammersley

Physical characteristics
- Source
  - location: central Eulalia Township, Potter County, Pennsylvania
  - elevation: between 1,800 and 1,820 feet (549 and 555 m)
- Mouth
  - location: Kettle Creek in Leidy Township, Clinton County, Pennsylvania
  - coordinates: 41°26′50″N 77°52′11″W
  - elevation: 968 ft (295 m)
- Length: 10.0 mi (16.1 km)
- Basin size: 32.55 sq mi (84.3 km^{2})

Basin features
- Progression: Kettle Creek → West Branch Susquehanna River → Susquehanna River → Chesapeake Bay

Hammersley Fork (also known as Hammersley Fork Creek) is a tributary of Kettle Creek in Potter County and Clinton County, Pennsylvania, in the United States. It is approximately 10.0 miles (16.1 km) long and flows through Warton Township in Potter County and Leidy Township in Clinton County. The watershed of the stream has an area of 32.7 square miles (85 km^{2}). The main rock formation in the watershed is the Pottsville Formation. A number of bridges cross the stream.

There are no state roads and virtually no township roads in the watershed of Hammersley Fork. However, there are dirt roads and gravel roads, and several stream crossings in the watershed. The first settlers arrived in the watershed in 1827 and the first roads in the area were constructed several years later. Industrial activities such as logging were common in the watershed in the early 20th century, but there is currently virtually no such activity there. Wild trout naturally reproduce in the stream throughout its entire length. Most of the creek has a substantial riparian buffer.

== Course ==
Hammersley Fork begins in central Eulalia Township, Potter County, near the Sinnemahoning Creek watershed. It flows southeast to Elk Lick Knob, where it receives the tributary Black Mark Hollow. The stream then turns south and flows into a valley, passing Bunnell Ridge. The valley gets deeper and the stream receives several small tributaries. It turns southwest shortly downstream of the mouth of Elkhorn Run. In the southern reaches of the township, the stream receives the tributary Bell Branch and turns south-southeast, exiting Eulalia Township.

Upon leaving Eulalia Township, Potter County, Hammersley Fork enters Leidy Township, Clinton County and continues south, passing by Susquehannock State Forest. The stream continues south for some distance and crosses Pennsylvania Route 144. Immediately after crossing Pennsylvania Route 144, the stream reaches its confluence with Kettle Creek. Hammersley Fork joins Kettle Creek 19.90 miles (32.03 km) upstream of its mouth.

== Hydrology ==
The concentration of alkalinity in Hammersley Fork ranges from 0.011 to 0.015 ounces per cubic foot (11 to 15 mg/L). Particles in the stream include coarse sand and fine gravel. The stream experiences relatively high water temperatures and in July 2003, its temperature between Dry Hollow and Bunnell Run ranges from 68 to 72 °F (20 to 22 °C). Between Dry Hollow and Nelson Branch, the temperature ranged from 70 to 73 °F (21 to 23 °C).

The sediment load in Hammersley Fork is 0.27 pounds per acre (0.30 kg/ha) per year. The nitrogen load is 1.55 pounds per acre (1.74 kg/ha) per year, while the phosphorus load is less than half a pound per acre per year.

Between the mouth of Dry Hollow and the mouth of Bunnell Run, the waters of Hammersley Fork are a Rosgen type F and a Rosgen type C stream. (Note: The Rosgen Stream Classification System classifies streams by characteristics relating to their valley morphology, relief, and landform.) The upper part of the stretch of the stream between Dry Hollow and Nelson Branch is a Rosgen type C stream. The middle part of the stretch is a Rosgen type B stream and the lower part is a Rosgen type F to D stream.

== Geography and geology ==
The elevation near the mouth of Hammersley Fork is 968 feet (295 m) above sea level. The elevation of the stream's source is between 1,800 and 1,820 feet (549 and 555 m) above sea level.

The Pottsville Formation is the main rock formation in the watershed of Hammersley Fork. The highlands northwest of the Hammersley Fork watershed range from 2,000 feet (610 m) to 2,200 feet (670 m) and the highest elevation in the watershed is 2,365 feet (721 m) above sea level. The elevation range in the watershed is 1,374 feet (419 m). At its mouth, the stream is 54 feet (16.5 m) wide. The average basin slope is 16.24 degrees. There are numerous gravel bars in the lower reaches of the stream. This width is maintained because deposition in the area is often removed. There is also a headcut in the lower reaches of the stream. At the headcut, it splits three ways for 69 feet (21 m). A spot on Hammersley Fork near its mouth is the only location in the Kettle Creek watershed that has been channelized.

Hammersley Fork flows over bedrock or large cobbles for much of the stretch between Dry Hollow and Nelson Branch. From the mouth of Nelson Branch to 2 miles (3.2 km) downstream, the stream mostly flows in the central part of its valley. The tributary Nelson Branch has a patch of erosion that is 26 feet (8 m) high and 59 feet (18 m) long. There is a floodplain at the mouth of Hammersley Fork. Two bridges cross Hammersley Fork near its mouth. One carries Pennsylvania Route 144 and the other carries Hammersley Avenue.

== Watershed ==
The watershed of Hammersley Fork has an area of 32.7 square miles (85 km^{2}) , making it the second-largest sub-watershed of Kettle Creek after Cross Fork. There are 57.42 miles (92.41 km) of streams in the watershed. The mouth of the stream is in the United States Geological Survey quadrangle of Tamarack. However, its source is in the quadrangle of Short Run. The stream also passes through the quadrangle of Hammersley Fork.

A number of camps and residences are on the left bank of Hammersley Fork 0.2 miles (0.32 km) upstream of the mouth. There are a number of dirt roads and gravel roads on the edge of the upper reaches of the stream's watershed. However, there are no state routes and almost no township roads in the watershed. However, much of the upper part of the watershed can only be accessed on foot. There are five road crossings of the stream and its tributaries. There is some agricultural land along the stream.

== History and recreation ==
Hammersley Fork was entered into the Geographic Names Information System on August 2, 1979 and its identifier is 1199877. It is named after J. P. Hammersley.

Jacob "Old Jake" Hammersley and Archie Stewart settled at the mouth of Hammersley Fork in 1827, with Hammersley settling on the east bank of the stream and Stewart settling on the west bank. They were the first settlers to come that far upstream in the Kettle Creek watershed. Additionally, the two constructed a gristmill on the west bank of the stream. There were no roads in the watershed by 1833. Later in the 1800s, Nathan Tuttle operated a gang mill on the stream. A settlement, also called Hammersley Fork, was created on the stream by 1852. In 1902, John Gartsee started a village called Hammersley in the middle reaches of Hammersley Fork. Its intended purpose was as a supply point for logging camps in the area. By 1902 to 1910, there was a network of railroads in the watershed.

Logging was a large industry in the watershed of Hammersley Fork in the early 1900s, but there have been almost no industrial activities in the area since then. An old railroad grade is located on Hammersley Fork. Fish have been stocked in the stream since the 1930s or 1940s.

A two-span steel stringer/multi-beam or girder bridge carrying T545 over Hammersley Fork was built in 1933 and repaired in 2010. The bridge is 64.0 feet (19.5 m) long. A two-span bridge was built over the stream in 1962 and repaired in 2011. This bridge is 107.0 feet (32.6 m) long and carries Pennsylvania Route 144.

The Cherry Springs Civilian Conservation Corps camp was built near the headwaters of Hammersley Fork in 1933. The Hammersley Trail, which is part of the Susquehannock Trail System, passes by the mouth of Hammersley Fork.

== Biology ==
Wild trout naturally reproduce in Hammersley Fork from its headwaters downstream to its mouth. Great blue herons have been observed at the headwaters of Hammersley Fork, despite the fact that they are more commonly found in large river valleys. Little yellow stoneflies also inhabit it. Brown trout first appeared in the stream in the 1920s after being stocked in Cross Fork and in the 1940s the brown trout populations significantly increased.

The Forrest H. Duttlinger Natural Area is located on Hammersley Fork. Most of the stream flows through this natural area. It is a 1521-acre area that includes a 158-acre area of old-growth hemlock trees. The Hammersley Wild Area is also located in the watershed. The stream's watershed is a Pennsylvania Natural Diversity Inventory Biological Diversity Area. The Pennsylvania Department of Environmental Protection also classifies the watershed as an exceptional-value area.

From the mouth of Hammersley Fork to 0.75 miles (1.21 km) upstream of the mouth, the canopy cover ranges from 0 to 50 percent. Much of the creek, however, has a significant riparian buffer.

The canopy coverage of the section of Hammersley Fork between Dry Hollow and Bunnell Run is 62 percent on average. However, the lower part of this section has 86 percent canopy coverage. The upper part of the stretch of the stream between Nelson Branch and Dry Hollow has a canopy coverage of 93 percent. The middle part of this section has a coverage of 58 percent and the lowest part has a canopy coverage of 89 percent. The tree coverage at the confluence of Nelson Branch with Hammersley Fork is 70 percent. The canopy coverage up to 2 miles (3.2 km) downstream of the confluence averages 40 percent. Tree species in this stretch include hemlock, red maple, river birch, sycamore, and willow.

== See also ==
- Cross Fork
- Twomile Run
- List of rivers of Pennsylvania
