= Samuel Cockburn =

Samuel Cockburn may refer to:

- Samuel Cockburn of Templehall (died 1614), Scottish landowner and diplomat
- Col. Samuel Cockburn (mercenary) (1574–1621), Scottish soldier who served in the Swedish army
- Dr. Samuel Cockburn (physician) (1823–1915), outspoken Scottish advocate for homeopathy
