= Lippe =

Lippe may refer to:

- Lippe (district), district in present-day Germany.
- Principality of Lippe, historical state in Germany
- Free State of Lippe, historical state in Germany
- County of Lippe, Imperial Estate of the Holy Roman Empire
- Lippe (surname)
- Lippe (river)
- Lippe (department), department of the First French Empire (from 1811–1814)
- House of Lippe
- Lippe Uplands
- Lippe, Indiana, a community in the United States
