= Alvin Bush =

American politician (1893–1959)

Alvin Ray Bush
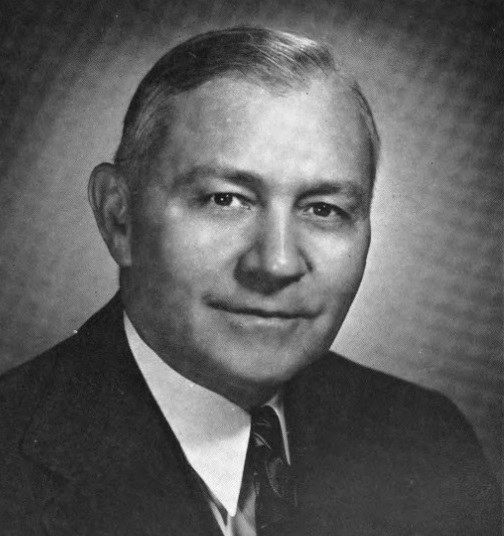

Member of the U.S. House of Representatives from Pennsylvania
- In office January 3, 1951 – November 5, 1959
- Preceded by: Robert F. Rich
- Succeeded by: Herman T. Schneebeli
- Constituency: 15th district (1951–53); 17th district (1953–59)

Personal details
- Born: June 4, 1893 Boggs Township, Pennsylvania, U.S.
- Died: November 5, 1959 (aged 66) Williamsport, Pennsylvania, U.S.
- Party: Republican

Alvin Ray Bush (June 4, 1893 – November 5, 1959) was a Republican member of the U.S. House of Representatives from Pennsylvania.

== Biography ==
Alvin Bush was born on a farm in Boggs Township, Clearfield County, Pennsylvania. At the age of thirteen started work as a laborer in Pennsylvania coal mines and later was an apprentice in a machine shop. During World War I, Bush served overseas as a corporal with the Five Hundred and Forty-first Motor Truck Company. He established an automobile repair business in Philipsburg, Pennsylvania. Bush purchased a bus line serving Philipsburg and neighboring communities, and later becoming president and general manager of the Williamsport Transportation Co. He operated a dairy farm in Lycoming County, Pennsylvania, and served as director of Lowry Electric Co. and Muncy Valley Hospital.

Bush was elected as a Republican to the 82nd United States Congress and to the four succeeding Congresses and served from January 3, 1951, until his death in Williamsport, Pennsylvania in 1959. Bush voted in favor of the Civil Rights Act of 1957.

== Namesake ==
The Alvin R. Bush Dam on Kettle Creek, north of Renovo, Pennsylvania, is named in his honor.

== See also ==
- List of members of the United States Congress who died in office (1950–1999)

U.S. House of Representatives
Preceded by Robert F. Rich	Member of the U.S. House of Representatives from Pennsylvania's 15th congressional district 1951–1953	Succeeded by Francis E. Walter
Preceded by Richard M. Simpson	Member of the U.S. House of Representatives from Pennsylvania's 17th congressional district 1953–1959	Succeeded by Herman T. Schneebeli
