= Kettle Creek State Park =

State park in Pennsylvania, United States

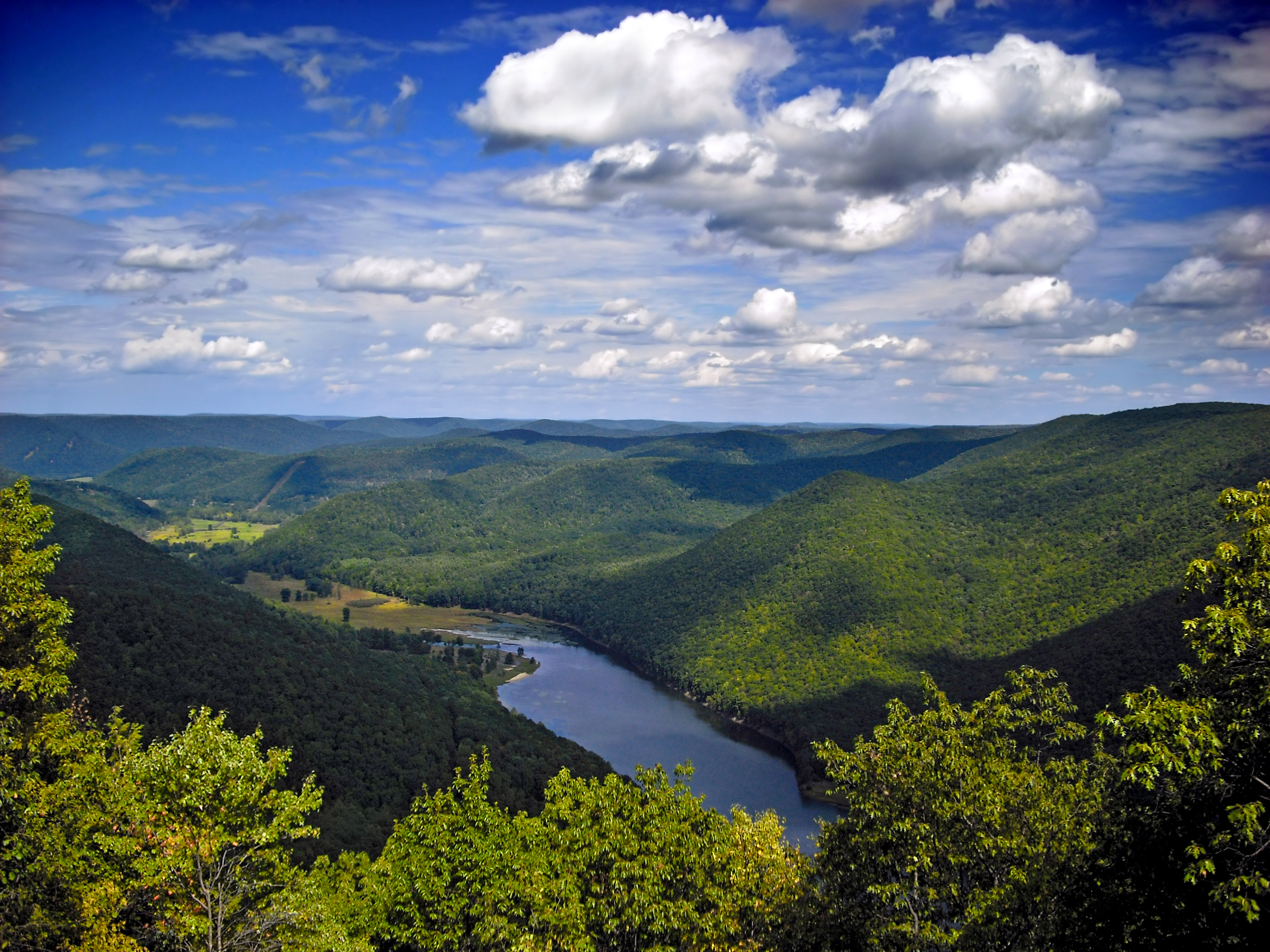

- Location within Pennsylvania Location within the United States
- Interactive map of Kettle Creek State Park
- Location: Leidy Township, Clinton County, Pennsylvania, United States
- Coordinates: 41°22′31″N 77°55′58″W
- Area: 1,793 acres (726 ha)
- Elevation: 1,115 feet (340 m)
- Established: 1962
- Administrator: Pennsylvania Department of Conservation and Natural Resources
- Website: Official website
- Pennsylvania State Parks

Kettle Creek State Park is a 1,793-acre (726 ha) Pennsylvania state park in Leidy Township, Clinton County, Pennsylvania in the United States. The park is in a valley and is surrounded by mountains and wilderness. It features the Alvin R. Bush Dam built in 1961 by the U.S. Army Corps of Engineers as a flood control measure in the West Branch Susquehanna River basin. Many of the recreational facilities at the park were built during the Great Depression by the young men of the Civilian Conservation Corps. Kettle Creek State Park is seven miles (11 km) north of Westport and Pennsylvania Route 120. It is largely surrounded by Sproul State Forest.

== Kettle Creek Reservoir ==
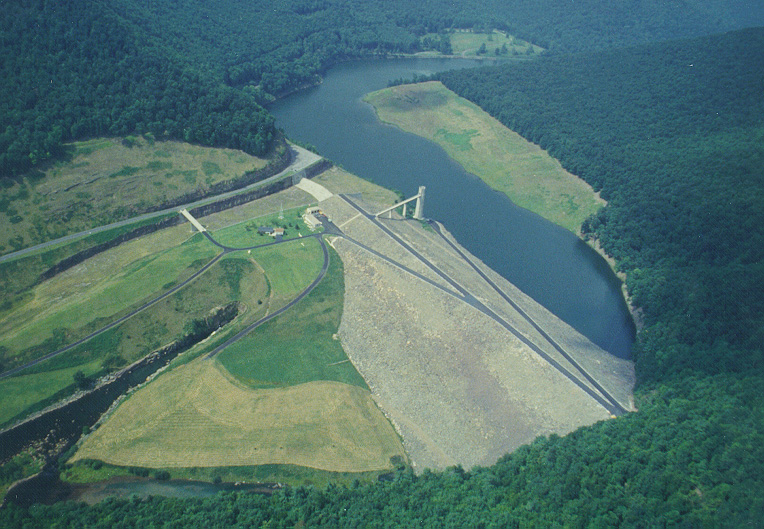
Alvin R. Bush Dam

Alvin R. Bush Dam on Kettle Creek is an earth and rockfill, flood control dam. It stands at a maximum height of 165 feet (50 m) above the stream bed and is 1,350 feet (410 m) across. The reservoir has a capacity of 75,000 acre feet (93,000,000 m^{3}) at the spillway crest. It covers 167 acres (68 ha) and is 2.2 miles (3.5 km) long. Alvin R. Bush Dam controls about 226 square miles (590 km^{2}) (92%) of the Kettle Creek drainage basin.

Kettle Creek Reservoir is open to some recreational boating, fishing and ice fishing. Gas powered motors are prohibited on the reservoir. Motorized boats must be powered by electric motors only. Sailboats, rowboats, canoes, kayaks, and paddleboats are permitted on the waters of the lake. All boats must be properly registered with any state. Swimming is prohibited.

== Elk ==
Elk can be seen quite often in the Kettle Creek State Park area.

== Fishing and hunting ==
Kettle Creek Reservoir is a 167 acres (68 ha) and serves as a fishery for trout, bass, bullhead, sucker, and panfish. Kettle Creek and it tributaries are excellent cold water fisheries. The fishing quality in the areas down stream of the dam has been damaged by pollution from acid mine drainage.

Most of Kettle Creek State Park is open to hunting. Hunters are expected to follow the rules and regulations of the Pennsylvania Game Commission. The common game species are American black bears, eastern gray squirrels, ruffed grouse, white-tailed deer, elk, and wild turkey. The hunting of groundhogs is prohibited.

== Bald eagles ==
Several bald eagles nest in the park area. On most days in the summer, it is not uncommon to see these animals patrol the waters for fish. It is a normal occurrence to see them soar over the lake and dive down to make a catch.

== Trails ==
The trails of Kettle Creek State Park are open to hiking, cross-country skiing, horseback riding, and mountain biking. There is a 22 miles (35 km) trail for horseback riding which begins and ends in the park and loops through Sproul State Forest. The mountain trail also loops through Sproul State Forest. It is 5 miles (8.0 km) long and, like the horse trail, begins and ends in the park. Kettle Creek State Park is a trail head for the 53 miles (85 km) Donut Hole Trail. There are several other short trails within the boundaries of the park.

== Camping and picnicking ==
There are two campgrounds at Kettle Creek State Park. One lacks water spigots and flush toilets. The Lower Campground has 44 sites all with electric hook-ups. The Upper Campground was 27 sites with 12 electric hook-ups.

The picnic area has 50 picnic tables with charcoal grills and water spigots. Some picnic tables are sunny and some are shaded. The picnic area includes a softball field and volleyball court. A playground is also located near the picnic area.
