= William Radde =

American publisher, bookseller and land developer

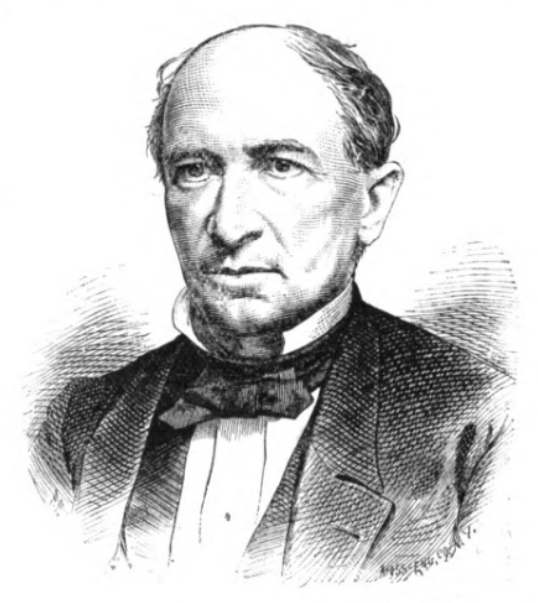
- Born: Wilhelm Radde; September 27, 1800; Berlin, Prussia
- Died: May 19, 1884 (aged 83); New York City
- Other name: Wilhelm Radde
- Occupation: Publisher
- Years active: 1837-1882

William Radde (September 27, 1800 – May 19, 1884) was a bookseller and publisher in New York City from 1837 to 1884. He published numerous books on homeopathic medicine. He was one of the founders of Hahnemann Hospital in New York City in 1869.

His career also included land development in Brooklyn and Queens, New York; improving land in Potter County, Pennsylvania, for German immigrants; railroad development; and, political service as a New York city Alderman. He was involved with many companies and associations.

== Early life ==
Radde was educated at the Werder Gymnasium in Berlin, where he learned Latin from Karl Gottlob Zumpt, Greek from Philipp Karl Buttmann, Sanskrit from Franz Bopp, mathematics from Christian Gottlieb Zimmermann, and theology and philology from August Ferdinand Ribbeck; he was afterwards an apprentice printer under Julius Starke, printer for Berlin University.

In 1824, Radde began working on Sanskrit books for the printing house Dondey, Dupré & Son in Paris. He was in Paris during the revolution of 1830. In 1831 he moved to London and received support from Lord Brougham, one of the founders of the Edinburgh Review, to begin compiling and publishing.

== Joining Wesselhoeft in America ==
While Radde seemed to have good opportunities in London, western Europe was in the midst of rebellions and gatherings against aristocratic rule in favor of constitutions and democracy. Radde might be considered a Dreissiger, as he immigrated to America during an 1830s surge in German American immigration.

In the 1830s and 1840s, Radde helped print and distribute the German language newspaper Alte und Neue Welt (Old and New World) with Johann Georg Wesselhoeft to assist German immigrants. In 1833 Radde left London to join Johann Georg Wesselhoeft (1804–1859) in Philadelphia, soon to expand Wesselhoeft's information service for immigrants in New York city and distribute the German language newspaper Alte und Neue Welt (Old and New World), first published in 1834. Wesselhoeft was trained as a printer by his uncles Johann Carl Wesselhoeft and Friedrich Frommann in Jena; he immigrated to America in 1832 with his brother Carl Friedrich Wesselhoeft; he visited his cousin William Wesselhoeft in Bath, Pa., where William had established a Homeopathic School of Medicine; in 1833 J. G. Wesselhoeft settled in Philadelphia to start an intelligence service for German immigrants.

...the establishment of a labor information network beginning in the early 1830s helped artisans find employment. The primary agents in this network were the various German aid societies in Philadelphia, New York, and Baltimore and German-language newspapers such as the Philadelphia-based Die Alte und Neue Welt (The Old and New World). As soon as immigrant ships landed, agents from one or more of the city’s German aid societies generally went on board to advise the newcomers.... Like benevolent societies, German-language newspapers also helped woodworkers find employment. J. G. Wesselhoeft, the owner of the nationally distributed Die Alte und Neue Welt (The Old and New World), used his newspaper to support the "information network" he established in the early 1830s. At the center of Wesselhoeft’s business was his "Address-und Nachfragungs Bureau" (address and inquiry bureau) at 471 Pearl Street in New York. As a complement to the New York office, he established a "Commissions Bureau" on the Place Louis-Philippe in Le Havre, France. For a fee, the Continental office provided Germans who were emigrating from French ports with information and advice to simplify their crossing and relocation and offered services such as letter and address forwarding. When the agency in New York received the specific requirements of an artisan, it provided that individual with "further information through which hand craftsmen and day laborers [could] obtain employment in most cases." The most amazing aspect of Wesselhoeft’s operation is that it was national in scope and presumably gathered information on job opportunities in every city in which his newspaper had an agent. His papers also ran lists of jobs available. One published by Wesselhoft’s German Intelligence Office in New York in June 1836 concluded: "All possible effort will be made to find a position for workers in other professions and crafts within eight days or less."

== Bookselling and publishing ==
=== Learning the American market ===
By 1835 Radde was settled in New York city at 498 Greenwich as an "agent of Wesselhoeft, and importer of German books." He married Christina Hoffmann in September 1835; his first son, William Jr., was born in October 1836, the same year Radde was "agent of Wesselhoeft, importer of French and German books," and providing a German intelligence office at 471 Pearl Street. In 1837, Radde was "importer of German, French, and Spanish books, wholesale and retail, 471 Pearl." By 1839, Radde had established his business at 322 Broadway, opposite New York Hospital.

In 1835 Johann Georg Wesselhoeft sold The Homoeopathist, or Domestic Physician, by Constantine Hering, through his three bookstores in Philadelphia, Baltimore and New York city.

Radde earned a living assisting immigrants, selling Wesselhoeft's newspaper, and importing books. More risky were his efforts to develop a publishing business; his earliest efforts were not successful. He wrote:

Encouraged by good friends, I had Goethe's Faust printed at the Staats-Zeitung printing office and with it began the publication of a selection from the best German classics. I was promised active support and the prospect of mountains of gold were held out to me. To those who placed large advance orders, I guaranteed 40-50 percent discount. However, the majority of Germans [German Americans] at that time showed no mercy in judging Faust not to be a genuine classic. The same fate was suffered by selections made from other classical writers like Schiller, Jean Paul, Körner, Novalis, Uhland, Hölty, Hauff, Spindler, E. T. A. Hoffmann, etc. The sales price for this entire anthology in 24 fascicles amounted to six dollars, while these works issued by me could not be imported for twelve dollars. In spite of everything, I could sell as good as nothing, indeed even the previously ordered copies came back and I had to sell almost the entire edition as waste paper. The German [German American] press mocked these unsaleable books as spurious classics; one should offer genuine classics to the Germans of America, the old Volksbücher and tales of robbers, they would sell better. This joke spread like wildfire and one of the first affected was Johann Hoffmann, colporteur in Reading. He wrote me: "I need immediately the following genuine classics for cash: 100 Schinderhannes [famous outlaw, folk hero], 100 Heilige Genovefa [St. Genevieve], 100 Bayrische Hiesel [Bavarian poachers or highway robbers], 100 Eulenspiegel. Larger orders will follow." He kept his word, and I have since sold to him and others many thousands of chapbooks.

Letter from William Radde to Friedrich Kapp, February 19, 1877

The 1837 edition of Goethe's Faust was the first American edition of Faust, published by "Verlags-Handlung, 471 Pearl Street, New York." Verlags-Handlung was a short-lived partnership between Radde and Georg Heinrich Paulsen. The financial panic of 1837 may have hurt sales. The New York Morning Herald praised its beauty:

New Edition of Faust.—The proficients in German literature have a great treat before them in a beautiful and perfect edition of the Faust of Goethe, just published by Mr. Radde, 471 Pearl street. It is elegantly printed — so elegantly that it would almost tempt one to learn the language to have the pleasure of reading the great philosophical tragedy in the original.

In 1837, Radde used public listings of German American newspaper agents' names and addresses to send selections of his books "on approval" to newspaper agents all around the United States—postage due. The New-Yorker Staats Zeitung printed a complaint against Radde's "aristocratic insolence," noting that their agents would return unopened any future unpaid shipments. One of the books he was importing and distributing at the time was a manual on sex hygiene by A. F. Krause. The publicity probably did Radde more good than harm.

By 1841, Radde had adjusted his business to market demands. Museum der Deutschen Klassiker (Museum of German Classics) became a bound book printed by Heinrich Ludwig, published by Radde, and widely distributed. Two of Radde's other early publications for the German American market also exist: Die Glocke (The Bell) by Friedrich Schiller, and Die Räuber: Abeneuer zweier Frende auf einem Schlosse in Böhmen (The robbers: adventures of two friends at a castle in Bohemia) by E. T. A. Hoffmann.

None of Wesselhoeft's other agents would attempt to make a living selling only books and newspapers; in America, most books and newspapers were sold as any other commodity in general stores offering hardware, toys, stationery, groceries, notions, and feed. In Germany and France, Radde had worked on academic books for wealthy customers and universities. In America he learned to sell inexpensive popular books through colporteurs, through local stores, and directly to primary and secondary schools (textbooks), though his English language advertising emphasized imported books and his own publications. Wesselhoeft was heavily influenced by Heinrich Zschokke to print cheap American progressive textbooks for German-American schools; in 1839 he published a German textbook for primary students, modified for American students. In 1837 Heinrich Ludwig in New York city published a German primer; he would later publish other inexpensive school books. Radde and Ludwig worked together as publisher and printer over the years, but few of their cheap pamphlets have survived. In English language newspapers and periodicals, Radde advertised his more expensive books.

The printer Heinrich Ludwig (Henry Ludwig) (?-1872) was a Palatine German American from Columbia County, New York. He started a retail book business in New York city selling German schoolbooks and hymnals printed in Philadelphia; in 1834, he established his own printing house and published the newspaper Allgemeine Zeitung (General Newspaper) (1835-1840?); in the 1840s he printed and imported German books; from 1852 to 1872 he published and edited Der Lutherische Herold (The Lutheran Herald) for the New York State Lutheran Ministerium. Ludwig and Radde, both German Lutheran printers of similar age, collaborated for many years. Radde was an energetic entrepreneur and philanthropist who did not set up his own printing press in America but rather used skilled local printers. Henry Ludwig printed The North American Journal of Homeopathy from 1856 to 1870, initially as "Book & Job Printer, 45 Vesey-st.," later as "Book and Job Printer and Stereotyper, Nos. 39 and 41 Centre Street." A hymnal printed by Ludwig in 1834 was stereotyped by Henry W. Rees. By 1854, a Ludwig publication was "to be had of all the principal Booksellers throughout the United States"

=== Homeopathic books and medicines ===
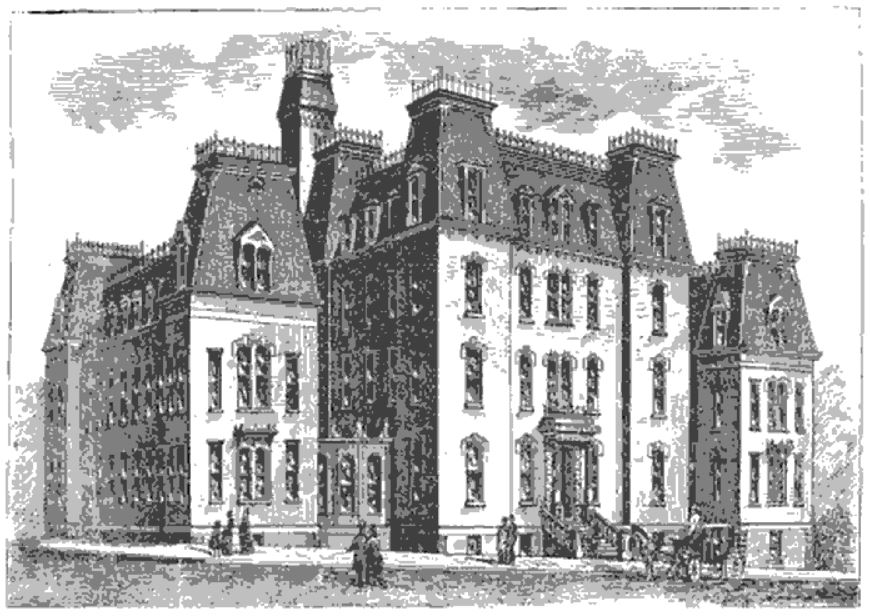
Hahnemann Hospital in New York City, 1884

"Homeopathic books and materia medica were the most profitable specialties pioneered and cultivated by Wesselhöft and his associates.... For most of the nineteenth century German-American firms dominated this market." Radde dominated the market for homoeopathic drugs in the United States from 1840, when he purchased Wesselhoeft's drug inventory and also became the United States agent for the Central Homoeopathic Pharmacy of Leipzig, to 1869, when he sold his homoeopathic interests to Boericke and Tafel of Philadelphia.

In the 1830s there was some evidence that homeopathic treatments had a lower mortality rate than mainstream medical practices of the time. Bloodletting and "purging" (induced vomiting) were mainstream medical practices for such illnesses as cholera and yellow fever. There were no antibiotics or vaccines in Radde's lifetime. "Allopathic medicine" was used to refer to mainstream medical practices of the time, and there was heated debate between allopaths and homeopaths. Radde supported homeopathy, particularly homeopathic research—as did the Wesselhoeft family and William Cullen Bryant, President of the New York Homeopathic Society in 1842.

Some Homeopathic Books Published by Radde

- Jahr's New manual of Homoeopathic Practice (Vol 1, 1841) (Vol 2, 1842), by Gottlieb Heinrich Georg Jahr. 2nd American Edition, from the third Paris Edition
- A Popular View of Homoeopathy (1842), by Thomas Roupell Everest (brother of George Everest)
- New Homoeopathic Pharmacopoeia and Posology (1842), by Gottlieb Heinrich Georg Jahr
- Homoepathic Domestic Medicine (1842), by Joseph Laurie
- Hydriatics, or, Manual of the Water Cure, 3rd Edition (1843), by Francis Graeter
- Enchiridion Medicum: The Practice of Medicine, 2nd Edition (1844), by Christoph Wilhelm Hufeland
- Short Elementary Treatise upon Homoeopathia (1845), by Gottlieb Heinrich Georg Jahr
- Chronic Diseases: their specific nature and homoeopathic treatment, Vol 5, Anti-psoric remedies (1846), by Samuel Hahnemann, translated by Charles Julius Hempel
- Jahr's New Manual (1848), Volumes 1–2, translated and edited by Charles Julius Hempel
- New Homoeopathic Pharmacopæia & Posology (1850), by Charles Julius Hempel, Buchner, Gruner and Jahr
- Jahr's New Manual (1853), Volume 3, or, Complete Repertory of the Homoeopathic Materia Medica, translated and edited by Charles Julius Hempel
- Hydriatic Treatment of Scarlet Fever in Its Different Forms (1857), by Charles Munde

Radde also published The North American Journal of Homeopathy, volumes 1–17, from 1851 to 1869.

=== Other publishing ===
Radde published The New American Lawyer in the United States of America from the 1850s to 1880s, which provided immigrants with "up-to-date regulations of each state on wills, liens, contracts, and similar practical matters, accompanied by sample legal forms." In 1870 he published Polyglot Pocket-Manual with English, German, French, Italian, Spanish and Portuguese words and phrases for "Students, Businessmen and Travellers."

== Land development ==
Beginning in the late 1840s, Radde developed communities in Brooklyn, Queens, Potter County, Pennsylvania, and possibly Tennessee.

== Companies and associations ==
=== German Society of the City of New York ===
Radde was a member of the German Society of the City of New York from 1839 until at least 1883, during a period when the German Society and other immigrant Societies were trying to assist an influx of immigrants from many nations. From 1826 to 1832, the Society was essentially without funds and moribund. In 1833, they published the first printed guide for immigrants. In 1834, the Society noted "it is recommended to establish a German Library and a Scientific Society in connection with the German Society, in order to attract new members to the latter," and "resolved to establish an agency for the benefit of German emigrants." In 1837, they added two physicians to their Board of Directors. In 1838, John Jacob Astor, president of the Society from 1837 to 1841, donated $5,000 to the Society. Over the following years, the Society was very active in assisting immigrants arriving in New York ports.

Radde did not become an admitted member of the Society until 1839. His acceptance was expeditious: in contrast, in 1838, "Mr. Charles M. Burkhalter, who has belonged to the Society for 45 years, and is its oldest member, was admitted to membership."

In 1841, Georg Heinrich Paulsen — Radde's partner in publishing the 1837 edition of Goethe's Faust, and also Radde's associate at Wesselhoeft's New York information agency — was appointed as the Society's first paid agent for assisting immigrants. He served in that position until 1845.

=== Government ===
In 1871, Radde served on the Committee of Seventy to oppose fraud by New York City public officials, and he later served as a member of the board of Aldermen.

== Notable associates ==
William Radde sent a telegram to Abraham Lincoln on Friday, January 16, 1863.

In 1878, William Cullen Bryant wrote a letter of introduction for Radde to Rutherford B. Hayes.

== Family ==
The names of Radde's parents and siblings are unknown, as is the name of the guardian who raised him. He married Christina Hoffmann (abt 1818–1880) in New York city in 1835; they celebrated their 25th wedding anniversary in 1860. They had six children: William Jr. (1836–1862), Emilia/Emily (abt 1841–1896), Francisca/Fanny (abt 1843–1921), Charles H. S. (abt 1845–1866), Louis E. G.(abt 1850–1893), and Philippina (abt 1852–1906). Emily married Theodore Gaston Glaubensklee in New York City in 1862. Louis married Marie Kaufmann in New York city in 1884. Philippina married Alfred L. Golsh in New York city in 1869. Radde's grandchildren were Philippina Golsh (abt 1875–1924) and Alfred L. Golsh (1870–1953). Most of the family is buried at Lutheran All Faiths Cemetery in Middle Village, Queens.
