= Lippe (surname) =

Lippe or Lippé is a surname. Notable people with the surname include:

- Adolph Lippe (1812–1888), German-born American homeopath
- Edouard Lippé (1884–1956), American singing teacher and composer
- Just Lippe (1904–1978), Norwegian journalist and politician
- Stefan Lippe (1955–2020), German insurance manager (Swiss Re)
- Urbain Lippé (1831–1896), Canadian politician
