= Herman T. Schneebeli =

American politician

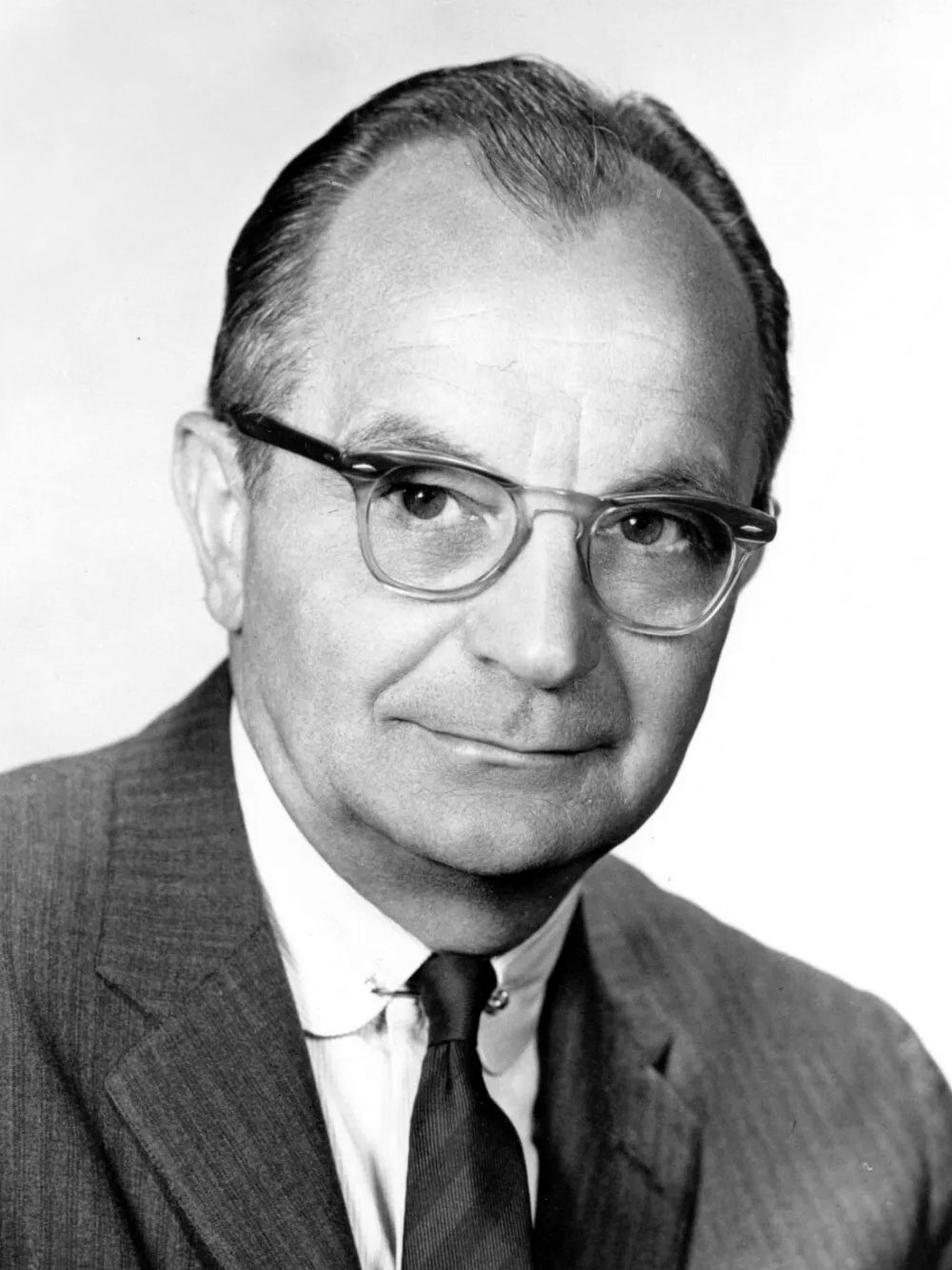

Member of the U.S. House of Representatives from Pennsylvania's 17th district
- In office April 26, 1960 – January 3, 1977
- Preceded by: Alvin Bush
- Succeeded by: Allen E. Ertel

Personal details
- Born: Herman Theodore Schneebeli; July 7, 1907 Lancaster, Pennsylvania, U.S.
- Died: May 6, 1982 (aged 74) Philadelphia, Pennsylvania, U.S.
- Party: Republican
- Education: Mercersburg Academy; Dartmouth College (AB), (MBA)

Herman Theodore Schneebeli (July 7, 1907 – May 6, 1982) was a Republican member of the U.S. House of Representatives from Pennsylvania.

Herman Schneebeli was born in Lancaster, Pennsylvania, to Barbara (née Schneider) and Alfred Schneebeli, both Swiss immigrants. He graduated from Mercersburg Academy in 1926, Dartmouth College in 1930, and Tuck School of Business in 1931. He worked as a commission distributor for Gulf Oil Corporation and an automobile dealer in Williamsport, Pennsylvania. He served as a captain in the United States Army Ordnance Department during World War II from 1942 to 1946.

He was elected as a Republican to the 86th United States Congress, by special election, to fill the vacancy caused by the death of United States Representative Alvin Bush, and was reelected to the eight succeeding Congresses. He was not a candidate for reelection in 1976.

The Herman T. Schneebeli Earth Science Center(Montgomery, Pennsylvania) at the Pennsylvania College of Technology and the Herman T. Schneebeli Federal Building in Williamsport, Pennsylvania are named in his honor.

U.S. House of Representatives
Preceded by Alvin Bush	Member of the U.S. House of Representatives from Pennsylvania's 17th congressional district 1960–1977	Succeeded by Allen E. Ertel
Preceded by John W. Byrnes	Ranking Member of the House Ways and Means Committee; 1973–1977	Succeeded by Barber Conable
