= George C. Barrett =

American judge

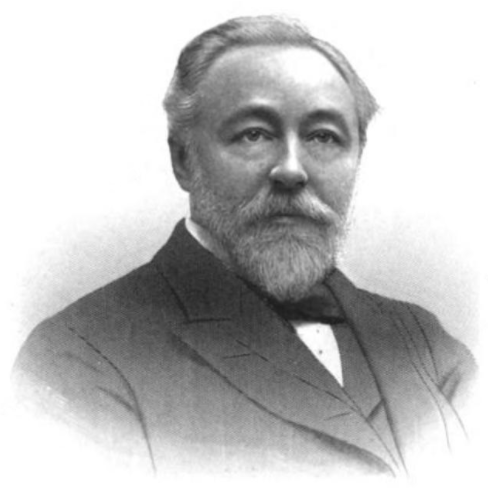
- Born: George Carter Barrett; July 28, 1838; Dublin, Ireland
- Died: June 7, 1906 (aged 67); Saratoga, New York
- Burial place: Woodlawn Cemetery
- Occupations: Lawyer, judge
- Spouse: Gertrude F. Vingut (m. 1866)

Signature
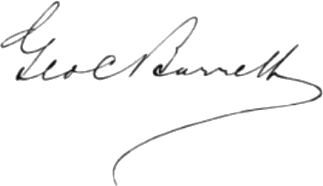

George Carter Barrett (July 28, 1838 – June 7, 1906) was an Irish-American lawyer and judge from New York.

== Life ==
Barrett was born on July 28, 1838, in Dublin, Ireland. He was the son of English Rev. Gilbert Carter Barrett of the Church of England and Irish Jane M. Brown.

In 1847, after his mother's death, Barrett moved to Canada with his father, who was assigned a missionary among the Muncey, and they settled in the Thames River. His father lost his voice to a cold shortly afterwards, and as he became proficient in the Muncey language he translated and read his father's writings to the people. He developed close ties with an old chief, who for many years would send him presents for Christmas. He also attended school in London, Ontario.

After his father finished his missionary activities, Barrett immigrated to America and moved to New York City, New York, with his uncle, lawyer William C. Barrett. In 1852, he went to Columbia Grammar School. He then went to Columbia College, but left to study law in the office of Van Cott, Cady & Smales. After he was admitted to the bar, he began to practice law. He also befriended Charles G. Halpine and under his influence started writing for the city press as well. In 1863, when he was 25, he was elected Civil Justice of the Sixth Judicial District. In 1867, he was then elected to the Court of Common Pleas to fill a vacancy. After his term expired in 1869, he returned to his law practice for the next two years.

Barrett was president of the Young Men's Municipal Reform Association while they were fighting the Tweed Ring. He was a member of the Committee of Seventy and, together with A. R. Lawrence, Francis C. Barlow, and Wheeler H. Peckham, was its counsel. He was also counsel for John Foley in the latter's injunction against the ring.

In 1871, Barrett was elected Justice of the New York Supreme Court. He was re-elected Justice in 1885. He also wrote the play An American Marriage in 1883. In 1896, when the Appellate Division was organized, he was one of the first five judges in the First Judicial Department. In 1900, although Governor Roosevelt reappointed him to serve an additional five years in the Appellate Division, he asked to be transferred back to the Supreme Court. He retired from the bench in 1906.

Barrett was a founder of the New York City Bar Association. He was a member of the Century Club, the Metropolitan Club, the Manhattan Club, and the Mendelssohn Glee Club. In 1866, he married Gertrude F. Vingut, widow of Professor Francisco Javier Vingut and daughter of writer and poet Sumner Lincoln Fairfield. They had a daughter, Angela Carter Barrett, who was dead by 1900.

Barrett died of tuberculosis in his summer cottage in Saratoga on June 7, 1906. He was cremated in Fresh Pond, and the ashes were buried in Woodlawn Cemetery.
