= Kettle Creek Reservoir =

Reservoir in northern Pennsylvania, U.S.

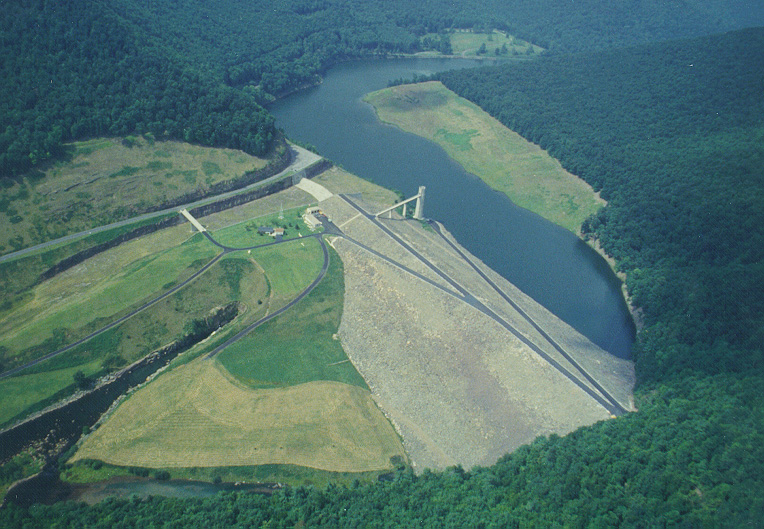
- Alvin R. Bush Dam and Kettle Creek Reservoir

- Location within Pennsylvania Location within the United States
- Location: Clinton County, Pennsylvania, United States
- Coordinates: 41°21′36″N 77°55′29″W
- Type: artificial
- Primary inflows: Kettle Creek
- Primary outflows: Kettle Creek
- Basin countries: United States
- Max. length: 2.2 mi (3.5 km)
- Surface area: 160 acres (65 ha)

Kettle Creek Reservoir is a reservoir at Kettle Creek State Park in Leidy Township, Clinton County, Pennsylvania in the United States. It is open to some recreational boating, fishing and ice fishing. It was constructed by the U.S. Army Corps of Engineers in 1961. Gas powered motors are prohibited on the reservoir. Motorized boats must be powered by electric motors only. Sailboats, rowboats, canoes, kayaks, and paddleboats are permitted on the waters of the lake. All boats must be properly registered with any state. The swimming area at the lake is on the northern end of the reservoir. Swim at your own risk. Lifeguards are not provided.

The Kettle Creek Reservoir is impounded by the Alvin R. Bush Dam. The dam is an earth and rockfill, flood control dam. It stands at a maximum height of 165 feet (50 m) above the stream bed and is 1,350 feet (410 m) across. The reservoir has a capacity of 75,000 acre-feet (93,000,000 m^{3}) at the spillway crest. It covers 160 acres (0.65 km^{2}) and is 2.2 miles (3.5 km) long. Alvin R. Bush Dam controls about 226 square miles (590 km^{2}) of the Kettle Creek drainage area. This is 92% of the total Kettle Creek drainage area. The dam is named in the honor of former US House Representative for Pennsylvania's 15th District Alvin Ray Bush.
