= Kettle Creek (Pennsylvania) =

Tributary of the West Branch Susquehanna River

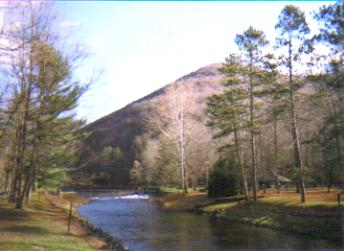
- Kettle Creek at Ole Bull State Park

Physical characteristics
- Source
  - location: Elk Township, Tioga County Pennsylvania
- Mouth
  - location: West Branch Susquehanna River at Noyes Township, Pennsylvania
  - coordinates: 41°18′03″N 77°50′18″W
- Length: 43 mi (69 km)
- Basin size: 244 sq mi (630 km^{2})

Kettle Creek is a tributary of the West Branch Susquehanna River running through Tioga, Potter, and Clinton counties, in Pennsylvania. It is slightly less than 43 miles (69 km) long. Although many streams in the Kettle Creek watershed are considered "Class A Wild Trout streams" by the Pennsylvania Fish and Boat Commission, the lower reaches of the stream experience acid mine drainage. The upper reaches of the creek are considered to be very high-quality.

Kettle Creek flows through Elk Township in Tioga County, then Abbott Township and Stewardson Township in Potter County, then Leidy Township and Noyes Township in Clinton County. Its mouth is at the community of Westport. Major tributaries include Cross Fork, Hammersley Fork, Little Kettle Creek, and others. The Kettle Creek Lake is located on Kettle Creek. Numerous metals and other substances contaminate the creek. These include iron, aluminum, manganese, and sulfates. The creek's discharge at Westport ranges from 4 to 6280 cubic feet per second and the pH ranges from 5.5 to 8.6. It also experiences abnormally high water temperatures.

Kettle Creek is a freestone stream. The rock in the watershed is mostly sandstone and interbedded sedimentary rock. Rock formations in the watershed include the Burgoon Sandstone, the Huntley Mountain Formation, the Pottsville Group, and the Allegheny Group. The Lower Kittanning and Upper Kittanning coal beds are also found in the watershed. The Kettle Creek watershed has an area of 244 square miles (630 km^{2}) in Tioga, Potter, Clinton, and Cameron Counties. The vast majority (approximately 93%) of the land in it is forested land and approximately 92% is publicly owned land, such as state forests. The watershed has a sparse permanent population, although it is home to numerous seasonal camps.

The Iroquois and Delaware Indians were the first inhabitants of the Kettle Creek watershed. The first European settler arrived in 1794 and with more settlers arriving in the following decades. The coal mining industry began in the watershed in 1874 and lasted until the 1970s. The lumbering industry lasted from the mid-1800s to around 1910. Natural gas was also extracted in the watershed in the 20th century.

== Course ==
Kettle Creek begins in a valley in the northwestern part of Elk Township, Tioga County. It heads southeast for a short distance before turning west and exiting Elk Township.

Upon exiting Elk Township, Kettle Creek enters Abbott Township, Potter County. It heads southwest, passing Bear Run Ridge, Rawson Ridge, Big Ridge, and several hollows, also picking up several small tributaries along the way. After a few miles, it enters Stewardson Township. Its course takes on a west-southwest direction and it passes by the community of Oleona, where it picks up the tributary Little Kettle Creek. It also begins paralleling Pennsylvania Route 144 at this point. Kettle Creek then makes a sharp turn to the south-southwest. The course soon resumes its southwestern direction, passing through Ole Bull State Park. The creek passes Keeney Mountain and several more hollows before turning west-northwest briefly to pick up the tributary Cross Fork in the southwestern reaches of Stewardson Township. The creek then turns southwest again and leaves the township.

When Kettle Creek leaves Stewardson Township, it enters Leidy Township, in Clinton County. Immediately after entering Clinton County, the creek passes a gauging station. It continues in a roughly southwesterly course, passing Dykes Peak and Turtle Point. It then receives the tributary Hammersley Fork as it passes through Susquehannock State Forest. A few miles after the mouth of Hammersley Fork, Kettle Creek makes two meanders and turns south, passing through Sproul State Forest and then Kettle Creek State Park. In Kettle Creek State Park, the creek goes through a lake and passes the Alvin R. Bush Dam, 8.5 miles (13.7 km) upstream of the mouth.

At the southern edge of Leidy Township, Kettle Creek makes several meanders, crossing the border between Leidy Township and Noyes Township three times. The creek then meanders several miles through Noyes Township, passing strip mines and another gauging station. The creek's mouth is at the community of Westport, near Pennsylvania Route 120.

=== Tributaries ===
Significant tributaries to Kettle Creek include Germania Branch, Little Kettle Creek, Cross Fork, Hammersley Fork, Trout Run, Beaverdam Run, Twomile Run and others. In the upper reaches of Kettle Creek, the tributaries Billings Branch, Sliders Branch, Germania Branch, and Long Run flow into the creek, in that order. They all enter Kettle Creek roughly from the north. In the middle reaches of Kettle Creek, Little Kettle Creek, Cross Fork, and Hammersley Fork flow into the creek from the north, in that order. Further downstream, Trout Run, Walters Run and Beaverdam Run enter the creek from the northwest and Hevner Run and Spicewood Run enter it from the east. Near Kettle Creek's mouth, Twomile Run enters it from the northeast.

== Hydrology ==
=== Chemical hydrology ===
At the United States Geographical Survey stream gauge downstream of the Alvin R. Bush Dam, the load of iron in Kettle Creek is 265.3 pounds (120.3 kg) per day. The daily load of iron is 234.2 pounds (106.2 kg) at the mouth of the tributary Twomile Run. The load of iron is 4.5 pounds (2.0 kg) per day at the mouth of the tributary Butler Hollow. At the mouth of Kettle Creek, the load is 278.5 pounds (126.3 kg) per day. The daily load of manganese at the mouth of the creek is 130.0 pounds (59.0 kg) and at the mouth of Butler Hollow it is 45.1 pounds (20.5 kg) per day. At the mouth of Twomile Run, the daily manganese load is 296 pounds (134 kg) and at the USGS stream gauge on Kettle Creek, the load is 70.8 pounds (32.1 kg) per day.

At the USGS gauge on Kettle Creek, the daily load of aluminum is 247.6 pounds (112.3 kg) and at the mouth of Twomile Run it is 394.2 pounds (178.8 kg) per day. At the mouth of Butler Hollow, the aluminum load is 40.2 pounds (18.2 kg) per day. At the mouth of Kettle Creek itself, it is 278.5 pounds (126.3 kg) per day. The daily load of acidity at the creek's mouth is 3,063.9 pounds (1,389.8 kg) per day and at the mouth of Butler Hollow it is 323.7 pounds (146.8 kg) per day. The acidity load at the mouth of Twomile Run is 4,162.7 pounds (1,888.2 kg) per day and at the USGS gauge the load is 1,132.1 pounds (513.5 kg) per day.

At the USGS gauging station on Kettle Creek, the concentration of iron is 0.15 milligrams per liter, the concentration of manganese is 0.04 milligrams per liter, and the concentration of aluminum is 0.14 milligrams per liter. The acidity concentration is 0.64 milligrams per liter and the concentration of alkalinity is 11.36 milligrams per liter. At the mouth of Twomile Run, the concentration of iron is 5.09 milligrams per liter, the concentration of manganese is 6.44 milligrams per liter, and the aluminum concentration is 8.57 milligrams per liter. The concentration of acidity is 90.5 milligrams per liter and there is no alkalinity.

The iron, manganese, and aluminum concentrations at the mouth of Butler Hollow are 1.68, 16.9, and 15.05 milligrams per liter, respectively. The concentration of acidity is 121.28 milligrams per liter and the alkalinity concentration is 0. At the mouth of Kettle Creek, the iron concentration is 0.15 milligrams per liter and the manganese concentration is 0.07 milligrams per liter. Aluminum occurs in concentrations of 0.15 milligrams per liter at the mouth of the creek. The concentration of acidity and alkalinity are 1.65 and 11.17 milligrams per liter, respectively.

In 2006, the concentration of sulfates at several points on Kettle Creek was measured. Upstream of Slide Hollow, it was seven milligrams per liter and in Slide Hollow, it was 910 milligrams per liter. The sulfate concentration of Kettle Creek upstream of Short Bend Run was 8 milligrams per liter. In Short Bend Run it was 431 milligrams per liter. Above Twomile Run on Kettle Creek, the sulfate concentration was 16 milligrams per liter and at the mouth it was 11 milligrams per liter. Upstream of the acid mine drainage, the sulfate concentration ranges from under 10 to 17 parts per million. In areas affected by acid mine drainage, the sulfate concentration ranges from 37 to 1375 parts per million.

The chloride concentration in the waters of Kettle Creek and its tributaries is very low, ranging from under one to three parts per million. There are high nitrate levels in parts of Little Kettle Creek and Kettle Creek. The phosphorus levels in the waters range from under 0.02 to 0.06 parts per million. Upstream of the Alvin R. Bush Dam, the concentration is less than or equal to 0.03 parts per million. The concentration of total suspended solids ranges from 18 to 44 parts per million above the Alvin R. Bush Dam. The concentrations of chromium, nickel, copper, zinc, arsenic, cadmium, and lead in Kettle Creek and its tributaries are so small as to be undetectable. The waters of the Kettle Creek watershed are relatively soft waters, with a hardness level of 6 to 145 parts per million. The dissolved oxygen concentration ranges from 6.5 to 18.2 parts per million.

The discharge of Kettle Creek at the USGS gauge at Westport ranged from 4 to 6280 cubic feet per second between 1970 and 2006. The median discharge was 208 cubic feet per second and the mean was 396 cubic feet per second. The pH of the creek at this point was measured in 1980 and 1983 to by 6.4. The tributaries Twomile Run, Huling Branch, and Middle Branch above the acid mine drainage have had their pH levels measured at 5.9, 5.7, and 5.5, respectively. The pH of the watershed ranges from 5.5 to 8.6. The alkalinity concentration of the waters of the creek ranged from 20 to 25 milligrams per liter in the 1950s and 1960s, but decreased to 11 to 15 milligrams per liter by 1993. Kettle Creek's level of specific conductivity ranges from 50 to 1500 micro-siemens.

On the western side of the lower reaches of the Kettle Creek watershed, there is an underground mine complex with 26 sources of acid mine drainage. The acid mine drainage enters Kettle Creek, among other streams in the area and the sources of it have an average discharge of 479 gallons per minute. They also have 304 milligrams per liter of acidity, 44 milligrams per liter of iron, 21 milligrams per liter of aluminum, 8 milligrams per liter of manganese, and 930 milligrams per liter of sulfates. The alkalinity load from the Alvin R. Bush Dam is about 15 times greater than the acidity load from these acid mine discharges.

Kettle Creek has been known to have an abnormally high water temperature since 1942. On warm, cloudless days, the temperature can be close to 80 °F (27 °C). On June 25, 2003, the water temperature of Kettle Creek was measured to be 67.5 °F (19.7 °C). The average precipitation by month between 1960 and 2000 ranged from 2.2 inches (5.6 cm) in January and February to 3.9 inches (9.9 cm) in June. The lower 12 miles (19 km) of Kettle Creek are affected by acid mine drainage. Most of the pollution in the watershed is nonpoint source pollution.

=== Dams ===
There are four impoundments on Kettle Creek. Three of them are state park impoundments, designed for recreation. They are known as the Ole Bull Dam, the Kettle Creek Dam, and Kettle Creek Lake. The Ole Bull Dam and the Kettle Creek Dam are between 12 and 15 feet (3.7 and 4.6 m) in height. The Alvin R. Bush Dam, which is also on the creek, is 165 feet (50 m) tall.

== Geology and geography ==
The lower reaches of the Kettle Creek watershed are in the Appalachian Plateau geographical region. The northern part of the watershed is in the Mountainous High Plateau Section, while the southern part is in the Pittsburgh Low Plateau Section. The highest elevation in the Kettle Creek watershed is 2,512 feet (766 m) above sea level, in the Cross Fork sub-watershed. Kettle Creek is a freestone stream, meaning that there is little limestone and alkalinity in it.

The soils in the lower part of the Kettle Creek watershed are highly acidic, deep, and well-drained. A total of 22 percent of the surface rock in this area is interbedded sedimentary rock, while sandstone makes up 78 percent. The Lower Kittanning coal seam is found in the Kettle Creek watershed. Rock formations in the Kettle Creek watershed include the Huntley Mountain Formation, the Burgoon Sandstone, the Pottsville Group, and the Allegheny Group. The Huntley Mountain Formation is from the Devonian period and the Mississippian epoch. The Burgoon Sandstone is from the Mississippian epoch and the Allegheny and Pottsville Groups are from the Pennsylvanian epoch. The Allegheny Group is the only rock formation in the watershed to contain coal that is economically worth mining.

The Kittanning Coals are found in high-elevation areas of the lower reaches of the Kettle Creek watershed. The Upper Kittanning coal is a bituminous coal vein that is found in the highest-elevation parts of the lower reaches of the watershed. It is typically 3 feet (0.91 m) thick. The Lower Kittanning Coal is found about 80 to 150 feet (24 to 46 m) under the Upper Kittanning Coal. It forms outcrops in the western part of the lower Kettle Creek watershed at 1,400 to 1,500 feet (430 to 460 m) above sea level, where the creek is at 760 feet (230 m) above sea level. The Columbiana Shale is located above the Lower Kittanning coal. It is acidic due to a presence of pyrite and has a sulfur concentration of 1 to 5 percent.

The Clearfield-McIntyre Syncline runs through the western lower part of the Kettle Creek watershed in a southwest-to-northeast direction. North of this syncline lies the Wellsboro Anticline. South of it lies the Hyner Dome. A set of fractures in the watershed causes the tributary Huling Branch to have a straight and narrow valley and for Kettle Creek itself to make a sharp 90-degree turn near the mouth of the tributary Twomile Run. Lateral bars that are nearly or completely devoid of vegetation can be found throughout the main stem of Kettle Creek. In the southern reaches of the watershed, where Pennsylvanian-epoch sandstones are located, the creek flows through steep valleys with narrow floodplains. In the central and northern reaches of the watershed, the main rocks are Mississippian and Devonian rocks. This part of the watershed is characterized by wider floodplains, less steep valleys, and some plateaus, enabling agricultural and residential development to a limited extent. Several miles upstream of the Alvin R. Bush Dam, the creek makes two 180-degree turns. This may eventually cause an oxbow lake to form.

The soil in the floodplains of the Kettle Creek watershed belong to the Barbour Series and the Craigsville Series. The soil in the valley slopes is Ungers and Meckesville soil. The soil on top of the watershed's ridges is Hazleton and Laidig soil. Lordstown Soil is found at the creek's headwaters.

There are several areas of significant streambank erosion on Kettle Creek. A quarter of a mile upstream of Germania Branch's confluence with the creek, there is an area of erosion that is 3.5 metres (11 ft) high for a 16 metres (52 ft) stretch. Near this point, there is another area where erosion extends 2.7 metres (8.9 ft) for an 18 metres (59 ft) stretch. Downstream of Germania Run, there is a stretch of bank erosion that measures 2.5 metres (8.2 ft) high and 22 metres (72 ft) long, with another one measuring 9 metres (30 ft) high and 28 metres (92 ft) long. On parts of Germania Branch, the height of the erosion ranges from 1 to 3 metres (3.3 to 9.8 ft) with some parts reaching as high as 5 metres (16 ft).

Downstream of Germania Branch's confluence with Kettle Creek, the latter creek's banks have a tendency to be high on one side and low on the other side. Kettle Creek doubles in size after picking up Little Kettle Creek. The channel size of the creek has historically not been widely studied, but in 1942 Watts et al. measured it to be 100 feet (30 m) wide between Hammersley Fork and Leidy. By 2000, it had increased to 154 feet (47 m) wide.

The water level at the Alvin R. Bush Dam typically maintains an elevation of approximately 841 feet (256 m) above sea level. The steepest basin in the Kettle Creek watershed is in the Alvin Bush Lake sub-watershed, with an average slope of 19.12 degrees. Other sub-watersheds with steep slopes include Spicewood Run (18.54 degrees), Walters Run (17.32 degrees), middle Kettle Creek (16.78 degrees), and Hammersley Fork (16.24 degrees). The least steep basin in the watershed is Twomile Run, with an average slope of 8.32 degrees.

== Watershed ==
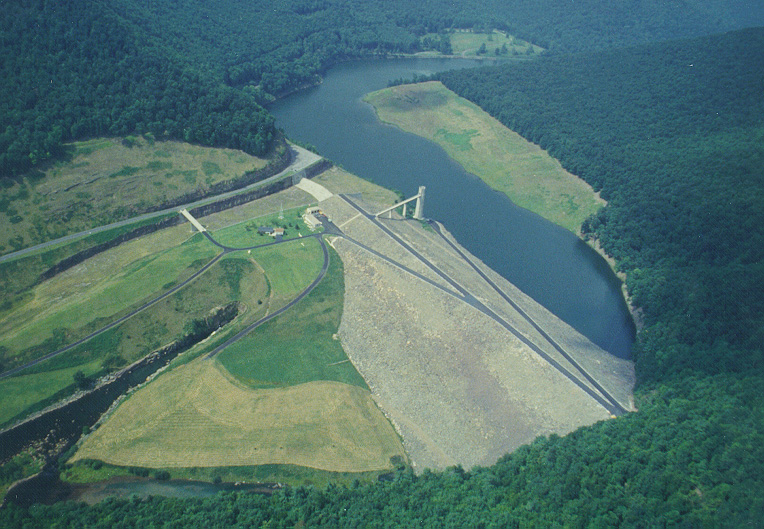
The Alvin R. Bush Dam, which separates the lower Kettle Creek watershed from the rest of the watershed

The watershed of Kettle Creek has an area of 244 square miles. It is located in Clinton, Potter, Cameron, and Tioga Counties. Forested land makes up 93.5 percent of the lower Kettle Creek watershed, 2.7 percent is abandoned coal mines and quarries, 2.4 percent is grassland, and 1.4 percent is developed land. This part of the watershed is not densely populated. The upper reaches of the watershed are also mostly forested, with some riparian meadows and camps. Public lands such as state forest or state park lands occupy 92 percent of the watershed. Most of the private land is located near floodplains. A total of 0.3 percent of the watershed, or 456 acres, (including 15 percent of the private land) is agricultural land. Much of the private and agricultural land is either in the northern reaches of the watershed, near Germania, or in or near the lower Kettle Creek valley. Wetlands make up under 1 percent of the watershed's area; 37 percent of them are on private lands. A total of 47 percent, or 382 acres, of the watershed's wetlands are riverine wetlands. palustrine wetlands cover 299 acres, or 37 percent of the total wetlands, and 133 acres (16 percent) are lacustrine wetlands. Most of the watershed's lacustrine wetlands are located in Kettle Creek's floodplain. Palustrine wetlands are found on the Kettle Creek Lake.

There are 429 miles (690 km) of streams in the watershed. The Alvin R. Bush Dam is considered to be the dividing point between the lower Kettle Creek and upper Kettle Creek watersheds.

The largest of the 17 major sub-watersheds of Kettle Creek are Cross Fork (49.92 square miles), middle Kettle Creek (45.29 square miles), Hammersley Fork (32.55 square miles), upper Kettle Creek (21.77 square miles), Little Kettle Creek (18.25 square miles), Trout Run (13.07 square miles), and Lower Kettle Creek (11.25 square miles). The smallest sub-watersheds are those of Spicewood Run (3.11 square miles) and Billings Branch (3.01 square miles).

The Hammersley Fork sub-watershed has large floodplains. There are no large settlements in the Kettle Creek watershed, although there are a number of small ones, like Westport. There are also numerous seasonal camps in the watershed.

Pennsylvania Route 44 goes through the Little Kettle Creek watershed. Pennsylvania Route 144 is also in the Kettle Creek watershed. The watershed has 294 miles (473 km) of roads, or 1.2 miles (1.9 kilometers) of road for every square mile of land. There are 119 miles (192 km) of roads in the watershed that are within 250 feet (76 m) of a stream; 48 percent of these are state forest or private roads, 26 percent are township roads, and 26 percent are owned by the state of Pennsylvania. Most of the roads are not paved. The Cross Fork sub-watershed has between 30 and 35 road crossings, the most of any sub-watershed of Kettle Creek.

Fewer than 20 percent of the residents of the watersheds are permanent inhabitants. Most seasonal inhabitants come from the area of Lancaster or Philadelphia. Approximately four percent of the residents of the Kettle Creek watershed live on small farms. There are a number of villages in the watershed, including Westport, Cross Fork, Oleona, Carter Camp and Germania.

== History and industries ==
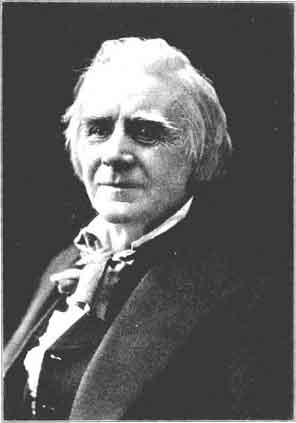
Ole Bull, founder of a failed colony in the Kettle Creek watershed

The Kettle Creek was inhabited by the Iroquois and the Delaware prior to European settlement. European explorers reached the watershed in the mid-1700s and the first settlers arrived in 1794. Most of the early settlers were farmers. A number of settlers of German descent formed a settlement in the northern part of the watershed, which came to be known as Germania. Overseen by William Radde and Charles Maine, Germania developed quickly between the 1850s and the 1870s. Slovaks began moving into the watershed in the early 1900s.

The Kettle Creek Path used by the Native Americans historically linked the Cowanesque River with the West Branch Susquehanna River via Kettle Creek. It is possible that Native Americans camped on the creek while hunting and fishing in the area. An Indian village existed at the mouth of the creek until it was destroyed by the military in 1763. In 1784, at the Treaty at Fort Stanwick, much of Pennsylvania's Northern Tier, including the Kettle Creek watershed, was purchased from the Iroquois, Delaware, and Wyandott for $7000. The Indians retained hunting rights in the area until 1804.

Richard Gilmore was the first person of European descent to lay claim to a plot of land on Kettle Creek. He settled there on July 21, 1794. James Caldwell was the second European to arrive, reaching the area by 1807. Simeon Pfoutz, a former resident of Perry County arrived in the watershed in 1813. Pfoutz also built a sawmill and gristmill on the creek. Other early settlers included John Calhoun and David Summerson, who arrived in 1822 and 1823, respectively. The population of the watershed increased fairly slowly in the early 1800s, with only a few families inhabiting the watershed by 1834.

Early roads in the Kettle Creek watershed include Boone Road, which was built in 1779 to aid in combat against the Six Nations and the Jersey Shore Road, which was built some time before 1833. The Jersey Shore Road was later renamed the Cloudersport and Jersey Shore Turnpike. Another road was built in 1834 in the watershed, followed by another road several years later that ran between the West Branch Susquehanna River and Cross Fork. Butler Road was built on the western side of the watershed in 1850. The first post office in the watershed was established at Westport in 1847. The first bridge to cross the creek was built in 1852 at Westport.

The Norwegian violinist Ole Bull attempted unsuccessfully to start a colony in the Kettle Creek watershed in 1852. A village was built by John Gartsee in 1853 at the confluence of Trout Run with the creek. The first schoolhouse in the watershed was built in 1858 on Yochum Hill. A railroad bridge was built at the mouth of the creek in 1859.

Several mills powered by Kettle Creek had been built by 1852. Logging, including cutting down hemlock trees, was historically done in the upper Kettle Creek watershed. The main companies doing logging in the area included the Lackawanna Lumber Company, and Emporium and Goodyear Companies. The lumbering industry in the watershed began in the mid-1800s. With the arrival of railroads in the area in the late 1800s, the industry became more prevalent. The Lackawanna Lumber Company began working in the area in 1893. By 1900, there were two railroads along the creek used for hauling logs to a sawmill near Cross Fork. However, the lumbering industry collapsed after 1910. The population had peaked around 1900 and numerous residents of the watershed left shortly after the collapse of the area's lumbering industry. Timber production was done to a limited extent in the northern part of the watershed, as of 2001. The population has remained relatively stable since the 1930s.

In the 1800s, settlement of the upper reaches of the Kettle Creek watershed centered on Germania, while the settlement of the lower reaches centered on the community of Leidy. A community near Trout Run began to attract people in the 1870s and 1880s.

Cheese was produced in the communities of Germania and Carter Camp in 1902. Mining of coal in the Kettle Creek watershed began in 1874. The coal was discovered by Joseph Russell and David Bly. The Kettle Creek Coal Company created the community of Bitumen in this year. The company also ran six underground mines in the area until 1929. Sixteen coal mines have been operated in the lower Kettle Creek watershed. A number of mines were sealed by the Works Progress Administration in the 1930s and the last underground mines were closed in the 1930s. Most of these mines were dip-up mines mining the Lower Kittanning coal. Strip mining was done in the watershed from the 1930s to 1977. The D. G. Wertz Coal Company and the Kettle Creek Corporation were two companies that strip-mined coal in the area during this period. The Lower Kittanning Coal was mined down to a depth of 60 feet (18 m).

Natural gas was discovered in the Kettle Creek watershed near Indian Camp in 1902. Two gas wells were built ten miles from Hammersley Fork in 1907. In 1920, two more gas wells were dug south of Cross Fork. They were approximately 3,500 and 2,500 feet (1,070 and 760 m) deep. The Clinton Natural Gas Company began extracting the gas. Drilling continued until 1958, when many of the wells ran dry.

In 1966, a sludge pond discharged a large amount of toxic waste into Kettle Creek. Over 185,000 fish were killed by this. Kettle Creek and other streams in its watershed had been channelized commonly between 1895 and 1913. The watershed experienced severe flooding in the early 1900s.

Hard surfacing of roads in part of the Kettle Creek watershed began in 1930 to 1938. The Alvin R. Bush Dam was built on the creek in the late 1950s to protect against flooding. The creek was the subject of an Operation Scarlift study from 1970 to 1972. A USGS gauge was installed on the stream in 1972. The Kettle Creek Watershed Association (also known as the KWCA) was founded in the late 1990s. The creek became the third Home Rivers initiative of Trout Unlimited in 1998. The main industries in the Kettle Creek watershed in the 21st century are tourism, agriculture, and lumbering.

There are two exposed petroleum pipelines on Kettle Creek between the Rauch Road Bridge and the mouth of the tributary Long Run. According to the Kettle Creek Watershed Association, it is possible that if they burst, Kettle Creek would be severely impacted.

=== Naming ===
It has been suggested that Kettle Creek is named for kettles used by the Native Americans on the West Branch Susquehanna River.

== Biology ==
There are 67 miles (108 km) of streams classified as "Class-A" trout streams in the Kettle Creek watershed. However, the trout population was in decline in the 1990s. In the 1880s, large brook trout were common in Kettle Creek, but due to overfishing, such large trout were no longer found in the creek after 1918 to 1920. The Kettle Creek watershed contains eight percent of the Class A Wild Trout Streams in Pennsylvania. The levels of trout biomass at the headwaters can be as high as 243 kilograms (536 lb) per hectare. Brown trout were first introduced to the watershed in the late 1800s. They became common in the watershed in the 1940s. Rainbow trout began to be stocked in the creek in Clinton County in 1936 and Potter County in 1946. Yellow perch began to be stocked in the lower reaches of Kettle Creek between the mid-1930s and early 1940s. A total of 35 species of fish are found in the watershed, of which 21 are native species and 14 are not.

A herd of elk was introduced to the watershed shortly before November 2000. Black bears have also been observed in the watershed. Coyotes live in the watershed, and have been hunted and trapped. Other mammals living in the watershed include gray squirrels, beavers, minks, bobcats, raccoons, and red and gray foxes. The Allegheny Wood Rat has the potential to inhabit much of the watershed except for the northwestern part.

Wolves and elk lived in the watershed prior to European settlement. Bald eagles, ospreys, kingfishers, brook trout, and freshwater molluscs have all been observed on the tributaries Hammersley Fork and Trout Run. Bald eagles, ospreys, Canada geese, herons, and mallard ducks have visited Kettle Creek Lake. Various birds of prey have also temporarily visited the watershed. Ring-necked pheasants and ruffed grouse live in the watershed.

On Twomile Run above the acid mine drainage, a total of 19 macroinvertebrate taxa including 5 members of the orders Ephemeroptera and Plecoptera were observed in 1998. Below the acid mine drainage, there were only two taxa, neither of which belonged to Ephemeroptera or Plecoptera. Above the acid mine drainage on Middle Branch, ten macroinvertebrate taxa were observed, of which five belonged to Ephemeroptera or Plecoptera. Below the acid mine drainage, there were two taxa, neither of which belonged to Ephemeroptera or Plecoptera. In 1999, the macroinvertebrate density ranged from 197 to 1916 individuals per square meter. The concentration of fecal coliform in the water at Cross Fork is 2000 individuals per liter and the concentration of fecal streptococcus is 2400 individuals per liter.

Hilsenhoff Biotic Index values for Kettle Creek have been measured. The Hilsenhoff Biotic Index is a method of determining water quality based on the presence of macroinvertebrate families and their tolerance to pollution. It ranges from 0 to 10, with 0 being the least polluted. Kettle Creek ranges from 4.61 to 2.54 with an average of 3.32. The EPT Index (Ephemeroptera, Plecoptera, and Trichoptera Index) has also been measured for the creek. It ranges from 10 to 25 with an average of 17. There are 285 vertebrate species that have the potential to inhabit the Kettle Creek watershed.

A quarter of a mile downstream of a wooden bridge built across Kettle Creek in 2000, the canopy coverage is 30%. However, half a mile downstream of the bridge, the coverage is closer to 90%. In an area upstream of the confluence of Germania Branch with the creek, there is 20% canopy coverage. Downstream of Germania Branch, the canopy coverage is 78%. The creek has a riparian zone. It mostly consists of hemlock, cherry, river birch, and eastern hop hornbeam. Riparian buffers are deficient or completely absent on more than 40 miles (64 km) of streams in the watershed. Although there are riparian buffers in some places, the creek is often too wide to be completely shaded by these.

On Germania Run, some parts of the stream have 30% to 50% canopy coverage, while others have 80% to 100% canopy coverage. Canopy cover levels are 65% on most of Little Kettle Creek. Trees growing along this creek include hemlock, river birch, beech, red maple, striped maple, and willows infested by beetles. Yellow birch, sugar maple, and hemlock trees grow on the tributary Bearfield Run.

Mammal and bird diversity is high throughout the stream corridors in the Kettle Creek watershed. Reptile and amphibian diversity is the highest in the southern part of the stream corridors. Fish diversity is highest in the Twomile Run sub-watershed. Two wetlands can be found in the sub-watershed of John Summerson Branch Trout Run. One is a mixed graminoid swamp and the other is a broadleaf conifer swamp.

Half of the trees in the Kettle Creek watershed are northern hardwood trees. The remainder includes oak trees, which make up 29 percent of the watershed's trees, red maple (4 percent), aspen and gray birch (3 percent), Virginia pine, white pine, and hemlock (1 percent each).

== Recreation ==
The main recreational activities in the watershed are hunting, fishing, and hiking. There are numerous hunting and fishing camps in the Kettle Creek watershed. These are visited by people from across Pennsylvania and several other states. The upper reaches of Kettle Creek are also referred to as a "world-renowned" trout fishery by the Pennsylvania Department of Environmental Protection. The creek has been used as a trout stream since the 1870s. The former United States president Ulysses S. Grant once visited the watershed. The Pennsylvania Department of Conservation and Natural Resources has constructed an ATV trail in the Huling Branch sub-watershed. It is the largest public ATV trail in Pennsylvania. The upper reaches of Kettle Creek can only be reached by traveling on foot.

Ole Bull State Park is located in the Kettle Creek watershed. It opened in 1925. The Susquehannock State Forest is located in Potter County, near the creek's headwaters. Kettle Creek State Park is located in the watershed, near the Alvin R. Bush Dam. It is commonly visited by fishermen. Much of the lower part of the watershed is in Sproul State Forest. Tioga State Forest and Elk State Forest also occupy a small part of the watershed, on the northeastern and edges, respectively.

== See also ==
- List of rivers of Pennsylvania
- Kettle Creek State Park
- Drury Run
- Sinnemahoning Creek
