= Committee of Seventy (New York City) =

The Committee of Seventy was a committee of 70 citizens of New York City, formed in 1871 and under the lead of Samuel J. Tilden, which conducted an investigation and prosecution of misuse of government office by William M. Tweed.

== Foundation ==
In the summer of 1871, proofs were furnished that enormous frauds had been perpetrated by the existing officials upon the New York City treasury, raising the city debt in 2½ years from $50,000,000 to $113,000,000. One of the main areas of theft was the construction of the court house, large sums appropriated for its construction finding their way into the pockets of the “ring.” The amount ostensibly expended in its erection exceeded $12,000,000.

People were immediately aroused, and assembled in mass meeting in the Cooper Union on September 4, 1871, when a committee of 70 members was appointed, to take the necessary measures to ascertain the true state of the treasury, to recover any abstracted moneys, and to secure good government and honest officers.

In the November 1871 city election, the candidates favored by the people accused in the frauds were defeated by large majorities. The accused were subsequently prosecuted. Some of them were convicted and sentenced, while others fled the country. Several of the judges were impeached and resigned, or were removed from office.

== Later Committee of Seventy ==
Another Committee of Seventy was formed in the aftermath of the Lexow Committee of 1894, where Richard Croker's operation of Tammany Hall and the police force were under investigation.

== Members ==
- Henry G. Stebbins - Chairman
- William Frederick Havemeyer - Vice-Chairman
- Roswell D. Hatch - Secretary
- Emil Sauer - Treasurer
- George C. Barrett
- Jackson S. Schultz
- James Emott
- W. H. Neilson
- Isaac H. Bailey
- D. Willis James
- James M. Brown
- Henry Clews
- H. F. Spaulding
- Geo. W. Lane
- W. R. Vermilye
- E. Townsend
- Lewis Ballard
- Severn D. Moulton
- James M. Halsted
- J. B. Varnum
- Robert Hoe
- John Wheeler (New York politician)
- H. N. Beers
- Samuel Christie
- Thomas A. Ledwith
- Joseph Blumenthal
- John Adams Dix
- Geo. W. Varian
- J. J. O'Donohue
- Ed. Cooper
- Eugene Ballin
- William M. Evarts
- Julius W. Tieman
- Reuben W. Howes
- W. C. Barrett
- Albert Klamroth
- Frederick Schack
- John A. Stewart
- James B. Hodgskin
- B. B. Sherman
- C. E. Detmold
- Charles Crary
- Sam. D. Babcock
- Edwards Pierrepont
- Joseph Hodges Choate
- John Foley
- John Straiton
- Thomas McLelland
- J. M. Budny
- Henry Nicoll (politician)
- E. Krackouitzer
- Adrian Iselin
- Johnathan Sturges
- Theo. Steinway
- John Ewen
- John Cleve Green
- William H. Wickham
- Charles Watrous
- Simon Stern
- Robert Roosevelt
- Geo. W. Van Slyck
- William. C. Molloy
- N. G. Dunn
- T. C. Cunningham
- S. B. Ruggles
- Robert B. Nooney
- Francis C. Barlow
- Thomas W. Piersall
- William M. Fliess
- Joseph Seligman
- William Radde
- Edmund R. Robinson
