= E. B. Nash =

Eugene Beauharnais "E. B." Nash (8 March 1838 – 6 November 1917) was one of America's leading 19th-century homeopaths.

Born in Hillsdale, New York, Nash graduated from Cleveland Homoeopathic Medical College in 1874. He served as Professor of Materia Medica in the New York Homeopathic Medical College, and also taught at the Homoeopathic Hospital of London.

In 1903 he became president of the International Hahnemannian Association (IHA).

He is best known as an author of books on homeopathy. His obituary in The Homeopathic Recorder remembered him as, "one of the great teachers of medicine...[who] will live in his books and in the hearts of the many doctors he has helped to be better physicians," and stated, "There are a host of homoeopathic physicians in different parts of the world to-day that owe their success in healing the sick to the writings of Eugene B. Nash.

== Bibliography ==
- Directions for the domestic use of important homeopathic remedies, N.Y., 1874
- Leaders in Homeopathic Therapeutics: with Grouping and Classification, Philadelphia, Boericke & Tafel, 1899 (1st ed.), 1900 (2nd ed.), 1907 (3rd ed.), 1913 (4th ed.)
- Leaders in typhoid fever, Philadelphia, Boericke & Tafel, 1900
- Leader for the use of sulphur, with comparisons, Philadelphia, Boericke & Tafel, 1907
- How to take the case and to find the simillimum, Philadelphia, Boericke & Tafel, 1907 (1st ed.), 1914 (2d ed.)
- Leaders in respiratory organs, Philadelphia : Boericke & Tafel, 1909.
- The testimony of the clinic, Philadelphia, Boericke & Tafel, 1911.
