= Charles Julius Hempel =

German-born translator and homeopathic physician

Charles Julius Hempel (5 September 1811 in Solingen, Prussia – 25 September 1879 in Grand Rapids, Michigan) was a German-born translator and homeopathic physician who worked in the United States.

== Biography ==
After completing his collegiate course at Solingen, he attended lectures at the Université de France and Collège de France, in Paris, and financed his schooling by translating. At the Université de France, he assisted Jules Michelet, who succeeded François Guizot as professor of history, in the publication of his Histoire de la France ("History of France").

He came to the United States in 1835, and for ten years resided in the family of Piero Maroncelli, the intimate friend of the revolutionist Silvio Pellico. There he imbibed an ardent love for music and Italian literature and got to know the Carbonari refugees in America. Other significant influences were the social theorist Albert Brisbane and the theologian George Bush.

While attending medical lectures at the University of New York, where he graduated in 1845, he became associated with several eminent homeopathic practitioners, and soon after his graduation he began to translate some of the more important works relating to homeopathy. In 1855 he married Mary (Coggeshall) Calder, daughter of George Coggeshall of Grand Rapids, Michigan.

He was appointed professor of materia medica and therapeutics in the Hahnemann Medical College of Philadelphia in 1857. He had an approach to homeopathy distinct from the Hahnemann school. His translations could be a source of controversy in the homeopathic community; in particular Constantine Hering and Adolph Lippe raised objections because of errors in Hempel's early translations and unauthorized additions from his own experience.

When the Hahnemann Medical College was reorganized in 1860, Hempel and some others left. During his stay in Philadelphia, he also published his book, Materia Medica and Therapeutics. On the death of his father-in-law in 1861, he went to Grand Rapids to settle up the estate. He decided to make the change of location permanent and soon had a large homeopathic practice in that city.

His health failing, he traveled to Italy and Germany in 1872, but the change was not beneficial, and he returned to Grand Rapids, where he died. Hempel was one of the earliest honorary members of the British Homeopathic Society, and was the recipient of diplomas and certificates of membership from many medical colleges and associations. His translations and original works permit him to be called the father of English homeopathic literature.

== Works ==
- Life of Christ (1848) (in German)
- The True Organization of the New Church
- New Grammar of the German Language
- Christendom and Civilization (1840)
- A New and Comprehensive System of Materia Medica and Therapeutics, his chief work (1859)
- Homœopathic Theory and Practice in Surgical Disease, with J. Beakly (1865)
- The Science of Homœopathy (1874)

He published numerous translations, including:

- Samuel Hahnemann, Chronic Diseases (5 vols., Philadelphia, 1846)
- Franz Hartmann, Acute and Chronic Diseases (4 vols., 1849)
- George Heinrich Gottlieb Jahr, Mental Diseases and their Homœopathic Treatment (1853)
- George Heinrich Gottlieb Jahr, Diseases of Women and Children (1853)
- Schiller's Complete Works, editor (2 vols., 1861)
