= Forrest H. Dutlinger Natural Area =

Protected area in Clinton County, Pennsylvania, US

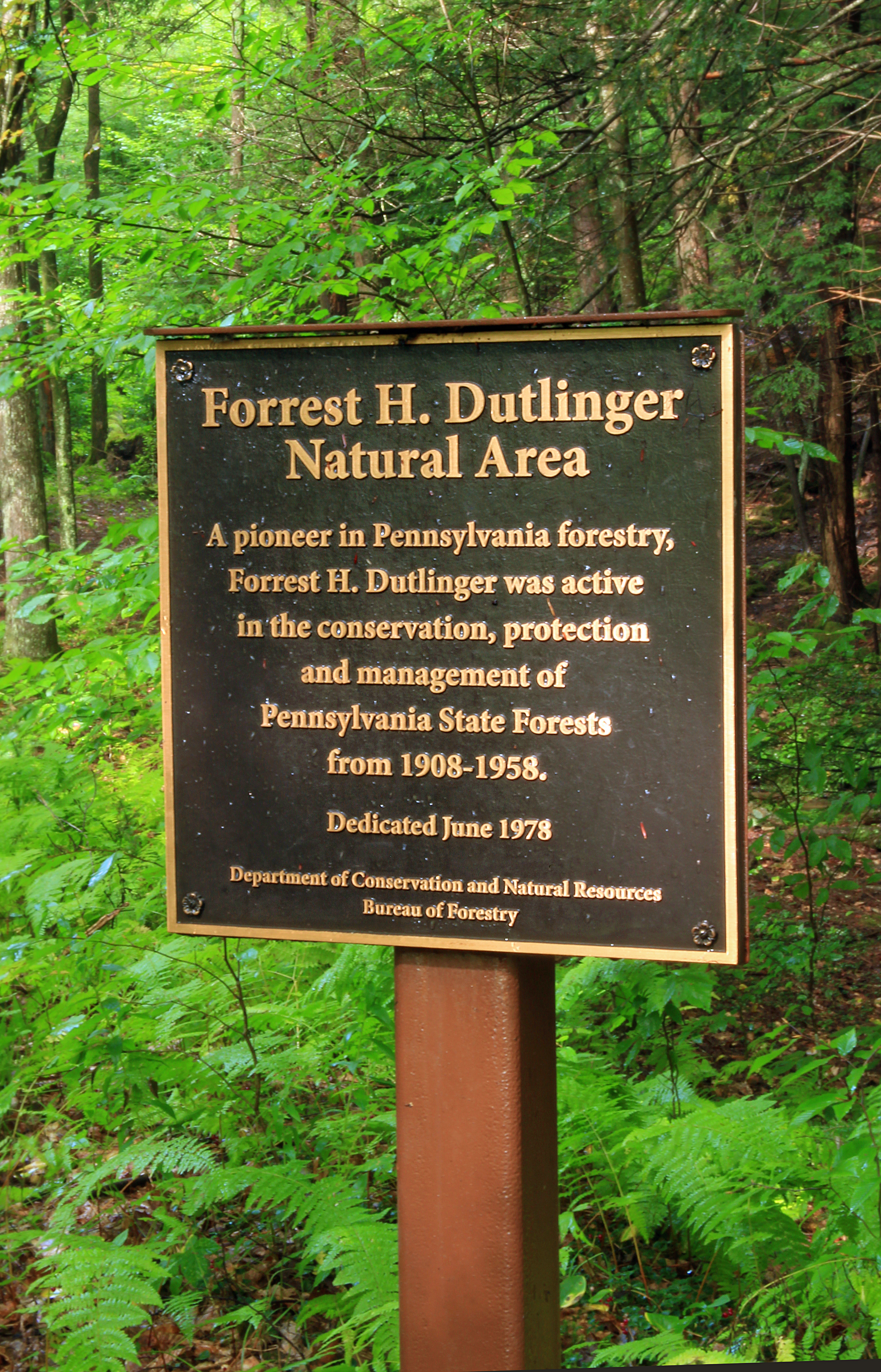
- An educational sign found at the Natural Area

- Location within Pennsylvania
- Location: Clinton County, Pennsylvania
- Nearest town: Cross Fork
- Coordinates: 41°28′11″N 77°52′39″W
- Area: 1,521 acres (616 ha)

The Forrest H. Dutlinger Natural Area is a protected area in Clinton County, Pennsylvania, United States. It is part of Susquehannock State Forest.

== History ==
The protected area was named after Forrest H. Dutlinger, a Commonwealth forester from 1908 to 1958, who had begun his career at a time of massive clear cutting of forests without any reforestation by the timber companies, along with rampant wildfires. Dutlinger became known for his efforts to revive the forests of the region, and he also attempted to ameliorate the spread of chestnut blight.

== Features ==
The protected area measures a total of 1,521 acres (616 ha), and includes a tract of old-growth forest measuring 158 acres (64 ha). The area is known for its very large trees. The old-growth forest once lay on the boundary of two lumber companies, but was apparently spared because of a dispute over a surveying error.

== See also ==
- List of old growth forests
