= Samuel Cockburn (physician) =

British doctor (1823–1915)

Dr. Samuel Cockburn, c.1895

Samuel Cockburn (born 17 March 1823 in Duns, Scottish Borders, d. 7 July 1915 in Glasgow) was a conventionally trained, for the time, Scottish physician who, early in his medical career, was won over by the principles of homeopathy. In the mid to late 19th century he was an outspoken defender of homeopathy and a critic of the medical establishment of the time, which practised what is now termed Heroic medicine.

Samuel Cockburn was born into a family of shoemakers in Duns, Scottish Borders, a market town that was the county seat of Berwickshire in the Scottish Borders. As a young man he worked as an apothecary on the Square in Duns, Scottish Borders. In 1848 he completed an MD degree from the University of St Andrews and received a Licentiate from the Royal College of Surgeons of Edinburgh (RCSEd). At this time the medical community in Edinburgh had already for some years been animated by a heated debate between the medical establishment (including such notable figures as Professor James Syme, Professor Sir James Simpson and Professor Sir Robert Christison) and proponents of the alternative medical system of homeopathy advocated at the University by Professor William Henderson, Professor Charles Ransford (a Fellow and former Treasurer of the RCSEd) and others. Efforts to expel Henderson from the RCSEd had already been made repeatedly in the 1840s and 1850s, but without success.

Cockburn was evidently won over by the alternative medical system, and spent the first 14 years of his medical career as the physician at the Dundee Homeopathic Dispensary (opened on 16 June 1849). In January 1856 he completed a book, titled Medical Reform, which was aimed at a broad readership and was published in both Great Britain and the United States. The book appeared at a critical time when the appropriate directions of necessary medical reform were being widely debated. In 1857 Prof. Syme published his second open letter to the prime minister, Lord Palmerston, calling for medical reforms that would require strict conformity with the conventional practices advocated by the RCSEd. Cockburn's work is both a strongly worded critique of conventional medical practices of that time (e.g. bloodletting and the ill-informed use of potentially dangerous medicines) as well as a vigorous defense of homeopathy. It attempts to discredit the medical establishment by giving examples of contradictory treatments recommended by contemporary medical theory (which Cockburn called allopathy, a derogatory term used by homeopaths). The book also denounced the "heavy-handed" attempts by the RCSEd to pressure its members (including himself) to avoid the "quackery" of homeopathy.

In 1862 Cockburn moved to Glasgow, where he practiced homeopathy for the rest of his career. As well as practicing homeopathy at his clinic, Cockburn continued to lecture and publish articles on homeopathy. He was an active member of the British Homeopathic Society and a well-known member of the homeopathic community in Glasgow in the late 19th century.

In his retirement, Cockburn wrote two books that expounded on his convictions concerning the relationship between science and religion.

== Publications ==
- Samuel Cockburn, Homeopathy, a System of Medicine founded on Facts, not on Speculation, 1850.
- Samuel Cockburn, M.D., Medical Reform: Being an Examination into the Nature of the Prevailing System of Medicine; and an Exposition of its Chief Evils; with Allopathic Revelations. A Remedy for the Evil, (Henry Turner, Manchester, 1856; R. Theobald, London, 1857; Demacher & Sheek, Philadelphia, 1857; William Radde, New York, 1857; University of Michigan Library, 2005, ISBN 1-4255-1502-9)).
- Samuel Cockburn, An Exposition of Homeopathic Law; with a Refutation of some of the Chief Objections advanced against Homeopathy: being a Lecture delivered in Glasgow under the auspices of the Glasgow Homeopathic Association, (James Cochrane, Glasgow, 1860).
- Samuel Cockburn, "Is the Doctrine of Infinitessimals Consistent with Reason and Experience?", Annals and Transactions of the British Homeopathic Society, and of the London Homeopathic Hospital, vol. IV, pp. 1–29, 1864.
- Samuel Cockburn, Fragmentary thoughts on the life and death forces, (Dunn and White, Glasgow, 1864).
- Samuel Cockburn, The Laws of Nature and the Laws of God: a reply to Prof. Drummond, (Swan Sonnenschein, Le Bas & Lowry, London, 1886).
- Samuel Cockburn, Thoughts in Verse: On Natural, Historical and Spiritual Subjects, (Aird & Coghill, Glasgow, 1909).
