= Gottlieb Heinrich Georg Jahr =

German-French homeopathic physician

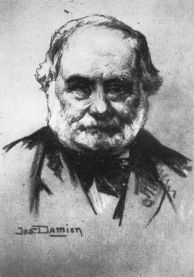
Georg Heinrich Gottlieb Jahr

Gottlieb Heinrich Georg Jahr (German pronunciation: [ˈɡɔtliːp ˈhaɪnʁɪç ˈgeːɔʁk ˈjaːɐ̯]; 1800–1875) was a German-French medical doctor and pioneer of classical homeopathy.

== Biography ==
After studying in a Moravian college, about 1825 he got to know Samuel Hahnemann, whose assistant he became. On Hahnemann's recommendation, he went to the University of Bonn to get a medical education. After his graduation, he went to Liège to practice, but soon followed Hahnemann when the latter moved to Paris in 1835. He got his M.D. in Paris in 1840. He left Paris for Belgium on the outbreak of the Franco-Prussian War in 1870. In Belgium, he first went to Liège, then to Ghent, and finally to Brussels. Without a Belgian diploma, he was not allowed to practice medicine in Belgium, and this restricted his income.

== Works ==
Many of his numerous works have been published in both French and German, and translated into English by Charles Julius Hempel and others. Among them are treatises on the homeopathic treatment of cholera, of nervous and mental diseases, diseases of the skin, etc., and a Homœopathic Pharmacopœia.

- G. H. G. Jahr's Manual of Homoeopathic Medicine (1836), translated by Constantine Hering
- Jahr's New manual of Homoeopathic Practice (Vol 1, 1841) (Vol 2, 1842), 2nd American Edition, from the third Paris Edition
- Short Elementary Treatise upon Homoeopathia (1845)
- Manual of Homœopathic Medicine (1847), Volume 1: Materia Medica, Volume 2: Therapeutical & Symptomatological Repertory, translated and edited by Paul Francis Curie
- Jahr's New Manual (1848), Volumes 1-2, translated and edited by Charles Julius Hempel
- New Homœopathic Pharmacopæia & Posology (1850), by Charles Julius Hempel, Buchner, Gruner and Jahr
- Jahr's New Manual (1853), Volume 3, or, Complete Repertory of the Homœopathic Materia Medica, translated and edited by Charles Julius Hempel

== Additional sources ==
- Dr. George Heinrich Gottlieb Jahr (1800-1875), Pioneers of homeopathy, Thomas Lindsey Bradford, Presented by Dr Robert Séror
- George Jahr, author: Manual of Homeopathic Medicine
- Ripley, George; Dana, Charles A., eds. (1879). "Jahr, Georges Henri Gottlieb" . The American Cyclopædia.
