= Adolph Lippe =

Prussian-born American homeopath

Adolph Lippe (11 May 1812 near Goerlitz, Prussia – 23 January 1888 in Philadelphia) was a homeopathic physician who worked in the United States.

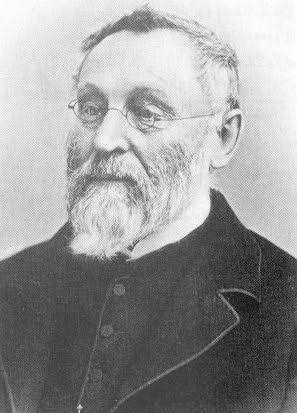
Count Adolph zur Lippe-Biesterfeld-Weißenfeld (1812-1888)

== Biography ==
His parents were Count Ludwig (1781–1860) and Countess Auguste (1795–1856) of Lippe-Weissenfeld. Adolph got a legal education at Berlin. After completing his legal studies, Lippe became interested in homeopathy, and emigrated to the United States in 1837 to further his study. In 1838, he enrolled in the North American Academy of Homeopathy at Allentown, Pennsylvania, from where he graduated in 1841.

He moved to Pottsville, thence to Carlisle, where he remained six years, and was successful in his treatment of the epidemics that then prevailed in Cumberland Valley. He then settled in Philadelphia, where from 1863 until 1868 he was professor of materia medica in the Homeopathic College of Pennsylvania. He devoted himself to establishing the claims of homeopathy, and augmenting and improving its materia medica.

== Works ==
Besides some essays and treatises from the French, German, and Italian which became standards, Lippe was author of two books:

- Comparative Materia Medica (Philadelphia, 1854)
- Text-Book of Materia Medica (1866)

== Family ==
He married Theresia Eichhorn and later Louise Augustine d'Arcy. Of his six children, two daughters died in infancy. His surviving daughter was Auguste Camilla (1847–1884). His three sons were Constantin (1840–1885), Francis Louis (born 1845), and William Alphonse (1850–1912). William Alphonse and his second wife survived him.
