= Cross Fork, Pennsylvania =

Former logging town in Pennsylvania, US

Coordinates: 41.4842°N 77.8182°W

Cross Fork is a census-designated place in the southwest corner of Stewardson Township in Potter County, Pennsylvania, United States. The village today is very small, but during the early 1900s it had a population numbering in the thousands and was an important lumbering center. Today, the Cross Fork area is known for trout fishing on Kettle Creek and Cross Fork Creek, including a children's fishing derby held annually in May.

== History ==
In the early 1900s the trees on nearby mountains were cut down. This small town now has only a fire department and a post office. However, it used to include a school, fire, ambulance, police, major league baseball, football, and many other facilities of a city. The town was burned down in the 1910s. There was a sawmill located along the creek that belonged to the Lackawanna Lumber Company. The sawmill burned down about 3 times but was rebuilt each time. The town quickly grew and was soon the biggest logging town in Pennsylvania. The nearby town of Austin was the runner-up.

When the trees were all gone the lumber company moved out and the town was burned. Very few people were left. The sawmill no longer exists and there was one building left that was condemned and burned in 2006. All local fire companies attended and used it as structural fire training. With the burning of this building the last of the history was gone. This town would be forever forgotten---however, the local community has organized events to bring in more population including Kettle Creek Valley Outdoors Show, now known as the Earl Brown Memorial Turkey Calling contest, Kettle Creek Music Festival, Cross Fork Snake Hunt, AMA Endurance Race and Fishing Derby.

== Geography ==
The community is located in the southwest corner of Stewardson Township at the convergence of Kettle Creek with its tributary, Cross Fork. There are a few remnant lumbering railroad grades along Kettle Creek near the village that were used to transport milled logs, convenient for hiking and fishing. Most of the riparian land is publicly owned, although some of the old right-of-ways traverse what are now private land holdings. Pennsylvania Route 144 is now the vital link through the community connecting northwest 8.6 miles to Oleona and to the south 18.2 miles to PA Route 120 just west of Renovo.
