= Cross Fork =

Tributary of Kettle Creek in Pennsylvania

Coordinates: 41°29′01″N 77°49′09″W

Cross Fork is a 14.4-mile-long (23.2 km) tributary of Kettle Creek in Potter County, Pennsylvania, in the United States.

Cross Fork joins Kettle Creek at the village of Cross Fork.

== See also ==
- Hammersley Fork
- List of rivers of Pennsylvania
