= Westport, Pennsylvania =

Unincorporated community in Pennsylvania, US

Coordinates: 41°18′06″N 77°50′25″W

Westport is an unincorporated community that is located in Clinton County, Pennsylvania, United States. It lies above the Susquehanna River and is near Pennsylvania Route 120.

== History ==
According to the Historical View of Clinton County, Pennsylvania by "D. S. Maynard", Westport, Pennsylvania in Noyes Township was formerly known as Kettle Creek. This is also mentioned on The Clinton County Register & Recorders Office website and other sources.

The first settlement at the mouth of Kettle Creek was in 1785, when the land was a part of Pine Creek Township, Northumberland County, Pennsylvania.

The Kettle Creek post office was established circa 1847 or 1848, but was discontinued, leaving the present community of Westport without a Post Office for about a year. In 1850, a new post office was established, but the name Kettle Creek was already taken by a post office located at the head of the Creek, so the name "Westport" was already in use, hence the current name.

The first bridge that spanned the creek at Westport, was erected by Clinton County in 1852. The first railroad bridge, which was only a few feet away, was built in 1859. Both bridges were swept almost simultaneously by a flood on March 17, 1865, which caused severe damage. However, both bridges were eventually replaced.
