= Leidy Township, Pennsylvania =

Township in Pennsylvania, US

Coordinates: 41°25′28″N 77°51′32″W

- Township
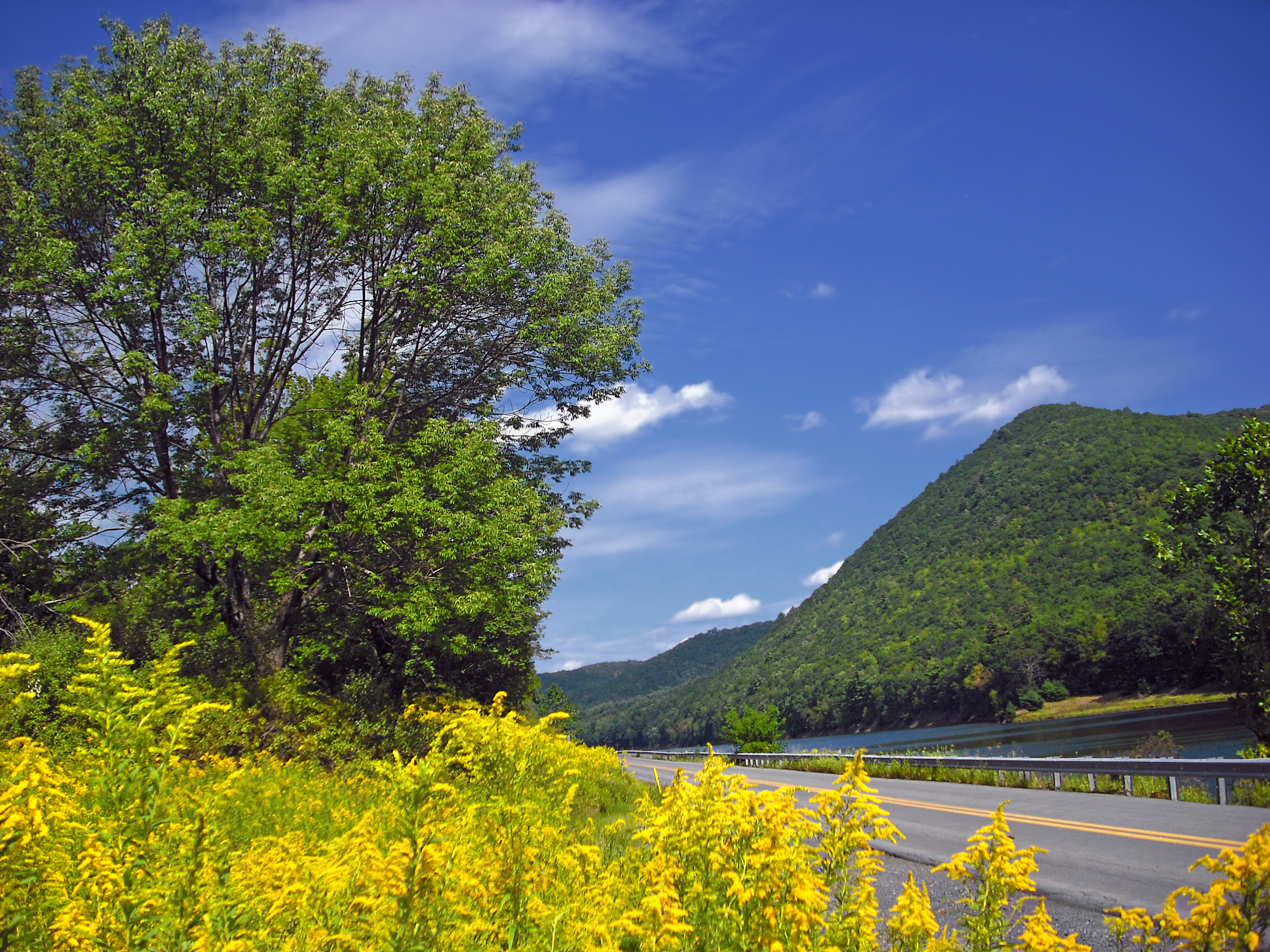
- Leidy Township

- Location in Clinton County and the state of Pennsylvania.
- Country: United States
- State: Pennsylvania
- County: Clinton
- Settled: 1813
- Incorporated: 1847

Area
  - Total: 97.15 sq mi (251.61 km^{2})
  - Land: 96.54 sq mi (250.04 km^{2})
  - Water: 0.61 sq mi (1.57 km^{2})

Population (2020)
  - Total: 155 ▼
  - Estimate (2021): 156
  - Density: 1.9/sq mi (0.72/km^{2})
- Time zone: UTC-5 (EST)
  - Summer (DST): UTC-4 (EDT)
- FIPS code: 42-035-42544

Leidy Township is a township that is located in Clinton County, Pennsylvania, United States. The population was 155 at the time of the 2020 census, down from 180 in 2010.

Kettle Creek State Park is located in Leidy Township.

== Geography ==
Leidy Township is in northern Clinton County and is bordered by Potter County to the north and partially by Cameron County to the west. According to the United States Census Bureau, the township has a total area of 97.1 square miles (251.6 km^{2}), of which 96.5 square miles (250.0 km^{2}) is land and 0.62 square miles (1.6 km^{2}), or 0.62%, is water.

== Demographics ==
Historical population
Census	Pop.	Note	%±
1980	263		—
1990	214		−18.6%
2000	229		7.0%
2010	180		−21.4%
2020	155		−13.9%
2021 (est.)	156		0.6%

As of the census of 2000, there were 229 people, 117 households, and 69 families residing in the township.

The population density was 2.4 people per square mile (0.9/km^{2}). There were 759 housing units at an average density of 7.8/sq mi (3.0/km^{2}).

The racial makeup of the township was 97.82% White, 1.31% Native American and 0.87% Asian.

There were 117 households, out of which 16.2% had children under the age of eighteen living with them; 53.0% were married couples living together, 6.0% had a female householder with no husband present, and 40.2% were non-families. 35.9% of all households were made up of individuals, and 19.7% had someone living alone who was sixty-five years of age or older.

The average household size was 1.96 and the average family size was 2.53.

Within the township, the population was spread out, with 13.5% of residents who were under the age of eighteen, 3.5% who were aged eighteen to twenty-four, 19.7% who were aged twenty-five to forty-four, 39.3% who were aged sixty-five to forty-four, and 24.0% who were sixty-five years of age or older. The median age was fifty-two years.

For every one hundred females, there were 112.0 males. For every one hundred females who were aged eighteen or older, there were 106.3 males.

The median income for a household in the township was $33,125, and the median income for a family was $37,000. Males had a median income of $40,313 compared with that of $16,875 for females.

The per capita income for the township was $28,279.

Approximately 4.7% of families and 8.4% of the population were living below the poverty line, including 23.1% of those who were under the age of eighteen and 3.4% of those who were aged sixty-five or older.
