= Rudolph Hering =

American civil engineer (1847–1923)

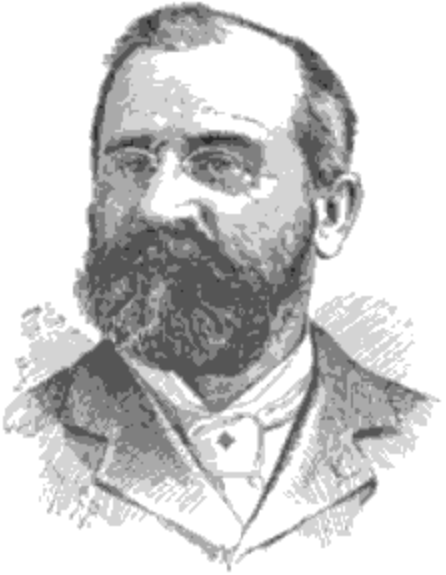
- Born: February 26, 1847; Philadelphia, Pennsylvania, U.S.
- Died: May 30, 1923 (aged 76); New York City, U.S.
- Resting place: West Laurel Hill Cemetery, Bala Cynwyd, Pennsylvania, U.S.
- Education: Technische Universität Dresden
- Occupation: Civil engineer
- Spouse(s): Fannie Field Gregory (m. 1873) Hermine Buchheim (m. 1894)
- Children: 5
- Father: Constantine Hering
- Relatives: Carl Hering (brother)

Rudolph Hering (February 26, 1847 – May 30, 1923) was an American civil engineer who designed and constructed the water supply and sewerage systems of 150 cities in Brazil, Canada, Mexico, and the United States. He partnered with George W. Fuller in the consulting firm Hering & Fuller from 1901 to 1911 and then formed the firm Hering & Gregory that operated until 1917. He served as president of the American Public Health Association and vice president of the American Society of Civil Engineers. The sanitary engineering division of the American Society of Civil Engineers instituted the Rudolph Hering Award in 1924 in his honor.

== Early life and education ==
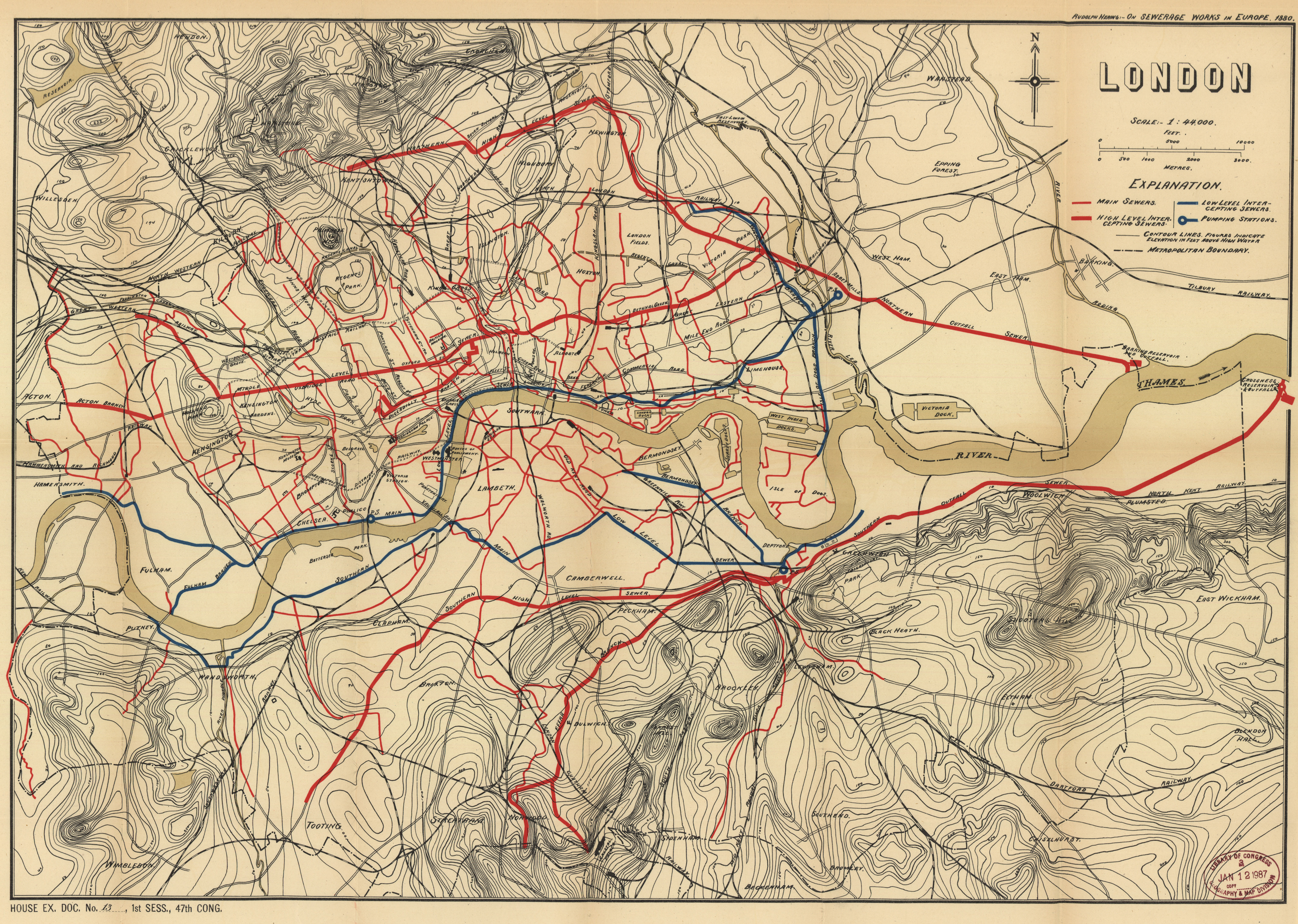
Hering's map of sewerage works in London, 1880

Hering was born February 26, 1847, in Philadelphia, Pennsylvania, United States, to Constantine Hering and Therese (Buchheim) Hering. He was educated in private schools in Philadelphia and traveled to Dresden in 1860. He attended public high school and in 1867 graduated from the Royal Saxon Polytechnic Institute with a civil engineering degree. He received an honorary doctorate of science degree from the University of Pennsylvania in 1907 and an honorary doctorate of engineering degree from the Polytechnic Institute at Dresden in 1922.

== Career ==
He worked as a surveyor during the development of Prospect Park in Brooklyn, New York City, and as an assistant engineer for Fairmount Park in Philadelphia from 1869 to 1872. He worked with Ferdinand Vandeveer Hayden on the topography study of Yellowstone National Park. He worked as resident engineer for the Girard Avenue Bridge in Philadelphia from 1873 to 1874 and as assistant engineer for various municipal projects in Philadelphia including bridges and sewers from 1875 to 1880.

He was commissioned by the National Board of Health to study European sewer practices and recommend changes in the United States to reduce the incidence of yellow fever.

From 1882 to 1888, he worked on the study of a new water supply for the city of Philadelphia, as chief engineer of the Chicago Drainage and Water Supply Commission which led to creation of the Chicago Sanitary and Ship Canal, and on the New York City sewer system. In 1889, he was appointed by President Benjamin Harrison as chairman of a commission to improve the sewage system in Washington D.C. He partnered in the consulting firm Hering & Fuller with George W. Fuller from 1901 to 1911 and then formed the firm Hering & Gregory until 1917.

He was a member of the commission that recommended in 1904 that New York City obtain its water supply from the Catskill Mountains. He designed the sewerage for Santos, Brazil, and Honolulu. He worked on the design and construction of waterworks and sewage systems in 150 cities in Brazil, Canada, Mexico, and the United States.

He worked with John C. Trautwine to translate from German the work of Wilhelm Kutter on open-channel flow. He was a proponent of the implementation of the Imhoff tank designed by Karl Imhoff for sewage treatment. He also introduced garbage incineration techniques from Europe to the United States.

He served as president of the American Public Health Association. He joined the American Society of Civil Engineers in 1876, served as director in 1891 and from 1897 to 1901; and vice president from 1900 to 1901. He was a fellow in the American Association for the Advancement of Science. He was a member of the American Institute of Consulting Engineers, the American Public Health Association, the American Society of Mechanical Engineers, the American Water Works Association, the Boston Society of Civil Engineers, the Canadian Society for Civil Engineering, the Institution of Civil Engineers, the Verein Deutscher Ingenieure, and the Western Society of Engineers.

He died at his home in New York City on May 30, 1923, and was interred at West Laurel Hill Cemetery in Bala Cynwyd, Pennsylvania.

== Personal life ==
He was married twice, first in 1873 to Fannie Field Gregory in Philadelphia, and then again in 1894 to Hermine Buchheim (daughter of Rudolf Buchheim) in Zittau, Germany. He had five children.

== Legacy ==
The sanitary engineering division of the American Society of Civil Engineers instituted the Rudolph Hering award in 1924 in his honor.
