= Antonio Pacinotti =

Italian physicist (1841–1912)

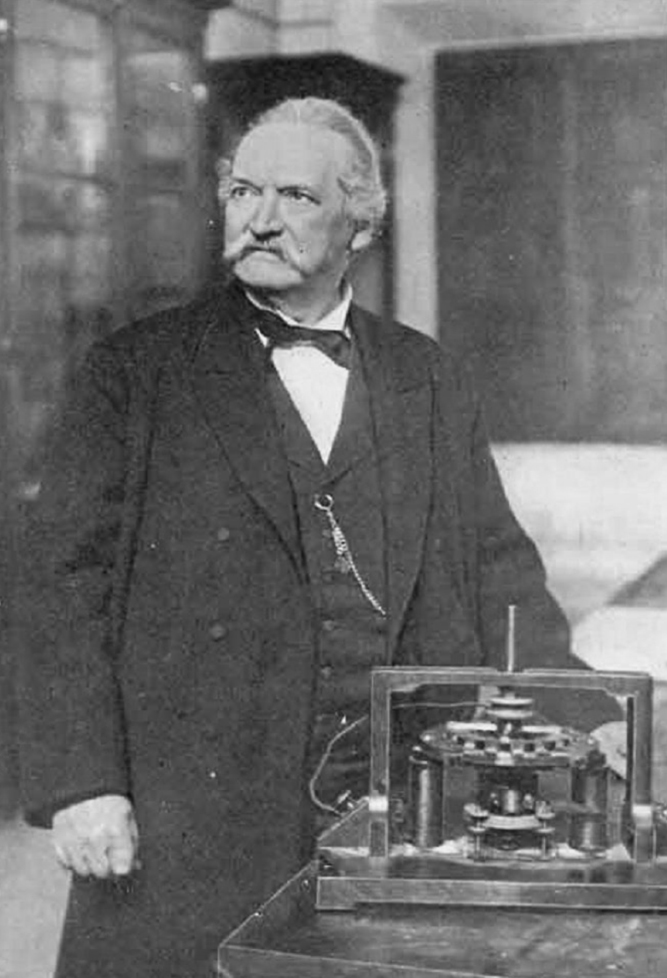
Antonio Pacinotti

Antonio Pacinotti (17 June 1841 – 24 March 1912) was an Italian physicist, who was Professor of Physics at the University of Pisa.

== Biography ==
Pacinotti was born in Pisa, where he also died. He was the son of Luigi Pacinotti and Caterina Catanti, attended the istituto arcivescovile Santa Caterina, and took part in the second war of Italian independence as sergente volontario. He was a student of Carlo Matteucci and graduated in mathematics at Pisa under Riccardo Felici. He was appointed as assistant to the astronomer Giovanni Battista Donati in 1862, professor at the technological institute of Bologna in 1864, professor of physics at the University of Cagliari in 1873, and, finally, successor to his father in 1881 in the chair of technological physics at the University of Pisa. Among his students was Augusto Righi.

Pacinotti died in Pisa.

== Scientific studies and invention of the dynamo ==
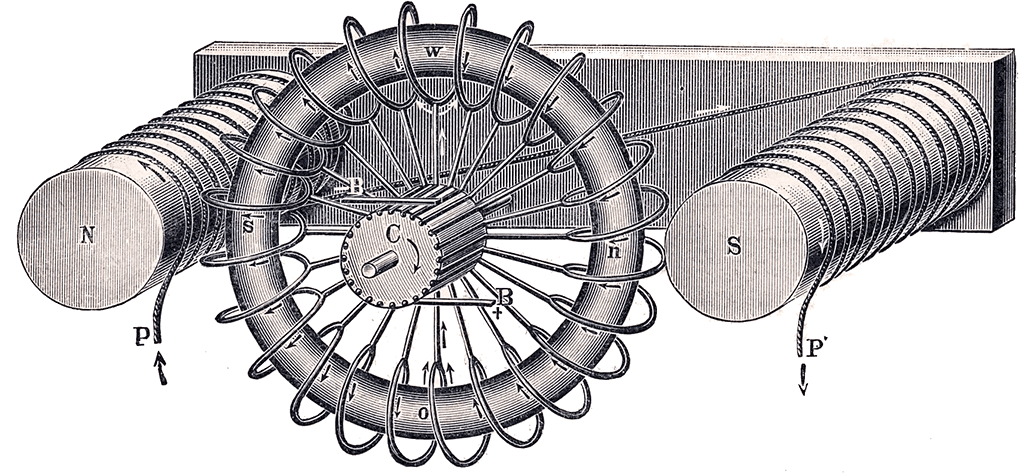
Pacinotti-Gramme ring armature

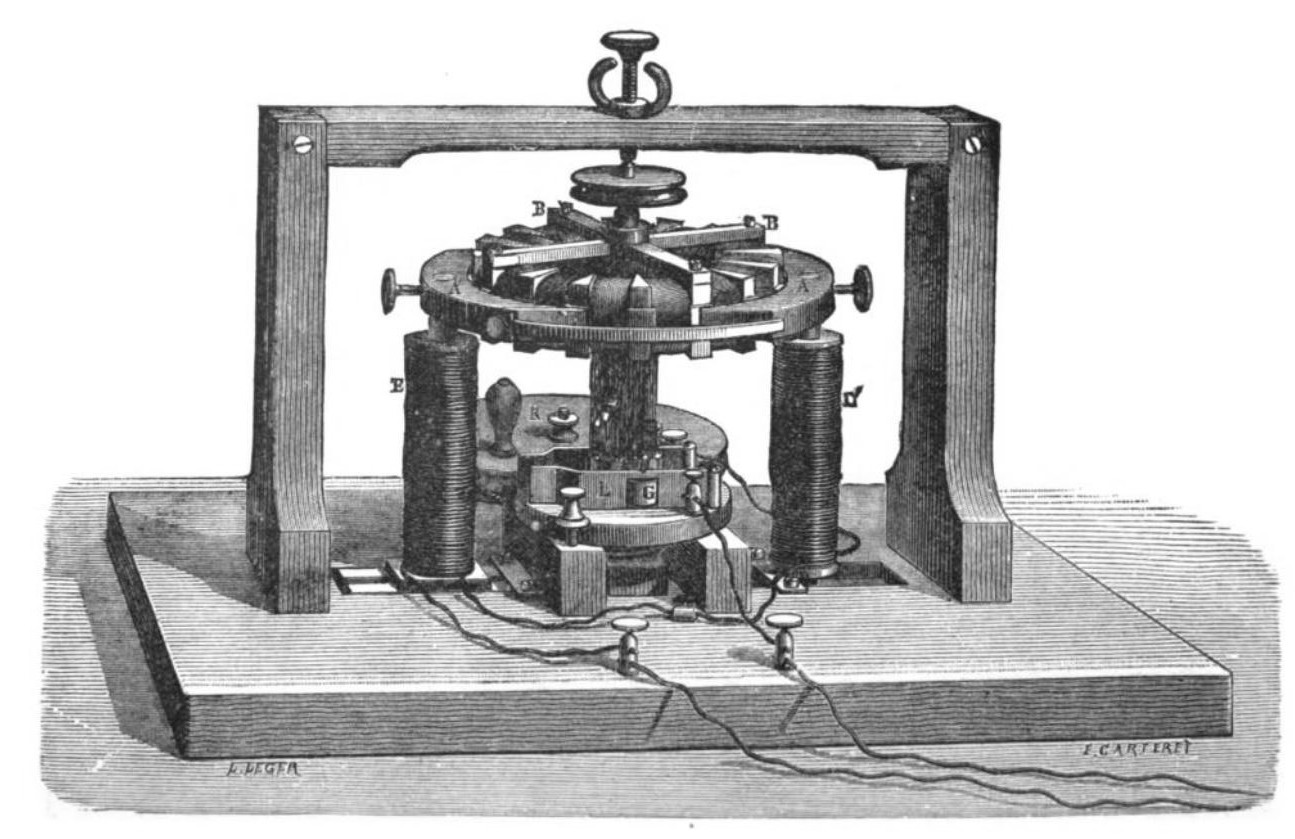
Dynamo of Pacinotti

He is best known for inventing an improved form of direct-current electrical generator, or dynamo, which he built in 1860 and described in a paper published in Il Nuovo Cimento of 1865. It used a ring armature around which was wrapped a coil of wire, to produce a smoother current than that available from previous types of dynamo. He found that the device could also be used as an electric motor.

In July 1862, Pacinotti was one of several independent discoverers of the comet 109P/Swift-Tuttle.

Lungarno Pacinotti, an embankment of the Arno River in Pisa, is named after him.
