= Blondel's experiments =

Blondel's experiments are a series of experiments performed by physicist André Blondel in 1914 in order to determine what was the most general law of electromagnetic induction. In fact, noted Blondel, "Significant discussions have been raised repeatedly on the question of what is the most general law of induction: we should consider the electromotive force (e.m.f.) as the product of any variation of magnetic flux ($\Phi$) surrounding a conductor or of the fact that the conductor sweeps part of this flux?".

In the first case Blondel referred to Faraday-Neumann law, which is often considered the most general law, while in the second case he referred to Lorentz force.

Normally experiments to verify the first case consist of measuring the induced current in a closed conducting circuit, concatenated to the magnetic induction field $B$ of a magnet, with $B$ varying in time, while for the verification of the second case usually we measure the induced current in a closed circuit of variable shape or moving by cutting perpendicularly a field $B$ constant.

The second case, however, is due to a variation of the magnetic flux $\Phi = B \cdot S$, not so much because the intensity of $B$ varies, but because the surface $S$ crossed by the field varies.

Blondel, on the other hand, devised "a new device which consists in varying the total magnetic flux passing through a coil, by a continuous variation of the number of turns of this coil". In this way $B$ and $S$ are constant for each coil, but the total flux varies with the number of coils affected by the field $B$.

It follows that, given the flux $\Phi$ concatenated to a single loop and $N$ the total number of loops, by Faraday-Neumann's law, the resulting electromotive force is:

$$\mathrm{e.m.f.} = -{d(\mathrm N \Phi) \over dt} = -\Phi{d\mathrm N\over dt},$$

i.e. dependent on the variation of the number of turns in time.

Blondel tested four configurations of his apparatus in which he demonstrates that a change in flux does not always generate an e.m.f. in a circuit concatenated to it, concluding that the Faraday-Neumann law cannot be the general law.

== Apparatus description ==
Blondel's Apparatus

The apparatus consists of an electromagnet E, whose U-shaped core terminates in two large parallel plates P and P' . Two induction coils B generate the magnetic field in E. Between the two plates there is a rotating wooden drum T on which an insulated electric wire is wound. The wire exits from the center of the drum and connects with a ring b integral with the drum and of negligible diameter with respect to the drum itself. A sliding contact f electrically connects the wire to a galvanometer G, by means of a resistor R so that current can flow even when the drum is rotating.

To the galvanometer is connected, in a specular way to the first, another drum T' which is connected to a motor M, able to rotate the drum T' at adjustable speed.

Finally, the electric wire passing through the center of both drums, after a certain number of windings around one of them, reaches the other drum, closing the circuit. When motor M starts up, it can increase the number of coils wrapped around T' by decreasing those around T or vice versa.

Blondel connects the wire through f to the wire wound on T in four different ways, making equally distinct experiments.

== The four experiments ==
=== First experiment ===
The wire wound on T is connected directly to the rotation shaft on which rests the sliding contact f, through the conducting ring b, of negligible diameter, as shown in the figure.

Connecting the drum T' to the motor M it quickly reaches a constant speed and so does the other drum T. Maintaining this speed for about a minute, the galvanometer needle moves, indicating the presence of an electromotive force (e.m.f.).

=== Second experiment ===
The wire wound on T is connected to a conducting ring of diameter equal to that of the drum T and integral with it. The contact f runs along the edge of the ring which turns with the drum.

So compared to the previous experiment f, instead of being connected with the center of the coil is connected at a point as far from the center as the radius of the coil itself.

In this case the galvanometer shows that e.m.f. induced during drum rotation is zero, unlike what could be expected having in mind Faraday's original experiment.

Since Blondel feared that it could be objected that the result is due to the fact that, during rotation, the circuit between f and the point of attachment of the coil wire to the ring may follow two different paths that partially neutralize each other, he makes a third experiment.

=== Third experiment ===
The wire wound on T is connected, by means of a sliding contact coming out from the edge of the drum, to the edge of a solid conducting disk, having a diameter equal to that of the drum T and parallel to it but detached, so as to remain stationary while the drum turns. The contact f rests directly on the central part of the disk.

Also in this case the e.m.f. measured by the galvanometer is zero.

From the last two results Blondel concludes that the e.m.f. measured in the first experiment was not caused by the progressive decrease of the flux but by the sweeping of the flux by the wire joining the center of the coil with the brush f.

To further confirm this he performs a fourth experiment.

=== Fourth experiment ===
The wire wound on T is connected to the edge of a solid disk of diameter equal to that of the drum T and integral with it. The contact f strips against the center of the disk.

In this case the galvanometer records a e.m.f. exactly equal to that of the first experiment. Not only that, but if you rotate the disc keeping the drums still, it still records the same e.m.f. that is caused only by the fact that a part of the circuit sweeps the flow. Moreover, by varying the point of contact of the coil from the outer edge to the center of the disc, the induced e.m.f. is proportional to the area of the circle having as radius the distance between the two points of attachment.

The result is analogous to the Faraday disk.

== Conclusions ==
From here Blondel deduces that:

1. When the magnetic field is constant, there is an e.m.f. only if the circuit cuts through the lines of force of the field, as in the first experiment (rotational axis-drum edge section). If this does not happen, even varying the total flux through the circuit, there is no e.m.f., as in the second experiment.
2. The case in which the closing line of the circuit (axis-edge section) moves within a solid conductor (but the conductor remains stationary), as in the third experiment, is not equivalent to the case in which the entire conductor moves, as in the fourth experiment (in this case the Lorentz force acts).

Thus "one must reject as inaccurate the too general statements of the law of induction" and to the statement that "An electromotive force originates in a closed circuit when the number of magnetic lines passing through it varies...." should be added "and when the variation is produced either by the conductor sweeping the lines of force or by a variation in the field of the inductor itself".

Basically experiments show how Faraday's basic law, that is the one that takes into account only flux variation, cannot be the general law of induction. In fact it is necessary to include also the contribution due to Lorentz force to obtain the general formula.

== See also ==
- Carl Hering
- Maxwell–Lodge effect
- Riccardo Felici
