= Hering's Paradox =

Experiment testing Maxwell's equations

Experiment showing Hering's Paradox: In both set-ups the same change in the magnetic flux is reached. However, only the oscilloscope of the experiment below shows a nonzero voltage.

Hering's paradox describes a physical experiment in the field of electromagnetism that seems to contradict Maxwell's equations in general, and Faraday's Law of Induction and the flux rule in particular. In his study on the subject, Carl Hering concluded in 1908 that the usual statement of Faraday's Law (at the turn of the century) was imperfect and that it required to be modified in order to become universal. Since then, Hering's paradox has been used repeatedly in physics didactics to demonstrate the application of Faraday's Law of Induction, and it can be considered to be completely understood within the theory of classical electrodynamics. Grabinski criticizes, however, that most of the presentations in introductory textbooks were problematical. Either, Faraday's Law was misinterpreted in a way that leads to confusion, or solely such frames of reference were chosen that avoid the need of an explanation. In the following, Hering's paradox is first shown experimentally in a video and -- in a similar way as suggested by Grabinski -- it is shown, that when carefully treated with full mathematical consistency, the experiment does not contradict Faraday's Law of Induction. Finally, the typical pitfalls of applying Faraday's Law are mentioned.

== Experiment ==
The experiment is shown in the video on the right side. In the experiment, a slotted iron core is used, where a coil fed with a direct current generates a constant magnetic field in the core and in its slot.

Two different experiments are carried out in parallel:

*In the lower part, an ordinary conductor loop is passed through the slot of the iron core. As there is a magnetic field in this slot, a voltage is generated at the ends of the conductor loop, which is amplified and displayed in the lower oscilloscope image.
*A modified conductor loop is realized in the upper part. The conductor loop is split at one point and the split ends are fitted with a metal wheel. During the experiment, the metal wheels move around the magnetic core and exert a certain contact pressure on each other and on the core, respectively. As the magnetic core is electrically conductive, there is always an electrical connection between the wheels and therefore between the separated ends of the loop. The oscilloscope does not show any voltage despite the otherwise identical conditions as in the first experiment.

In both experiments, the same change in magnetic flux occurs at the same time. However, the oscilloscope only shows a voltage in one experiment, although one would expect the same induced voltage to be present in both experiments. This unexpected result is called Hering's paradox, named after Carl Hering.

== Explanation ==
=== Moving wires/oscilloscope, magnet at rest ===
The easiest way to understand the outcome of the experiment is to view it from the rest frame of the magnet, i. e. the magnet is at rest, and the oscilloscope and the wires are at motion. In this frame of reference, there is no reason for a voltage to arise, because the set-up consists of a magnet at rest and some wires moving in a field free space around the magnet, which scratch the magnet a little.

To conclude, there is

* no change of the magnetic field anywhere ($\mathrm{rot}\vec E = -\frac{\partial \vec B}{\partial t} = \vec 0$) and thus no current-driving force $\vec F = q \cdot \vec E$ on the charges $q$ in the circuit due to rest induction,
* and those parts of the circuit having charges being at motion ($v_q \ne 0$) are not exposed to a magnetic field ($B=0$) and vice versa, so that there is no magnetic force $\vec F_{q} = q \cdot \vec v_{q} \times \vec B$ on the charges $q$ anywhere in the circuit.

=== Moving magnet, wires/oscilloscope at rest ===
A permanent magnet is moved into the conductor loop. Although a flux change occurs in the area under consideration, the voltmeter does not show any deflection.

While the perspective from the rest frame of the magnet causes no difficulties in understanding, this is not the case when viewed from a frame of reference in which the oscilloscope and the cables are at rest and an electrically conductive permanent magnet moves into a conductor loop at a speed of $v$. Under these circumstances, there is rest induction due to the movement of the magnet ($\frac{\partial \vec B}{\partial t}\ne 0$ at the front edge of the magnet), and beyond that, the magnet is also a moving conductor. The double function of the magnet as a conductor at motion on the one hand, and as the root cause for the magnetic field on the other hand raises an essential question: Does the magnetic field of the magnet exert a Lorentz force on the charges inside the magnet? The correct answer to this question is "Yes, it does", and it is one of the pitfalls concerning the application of Faraday's Law. For some people it is contraintuitive to assume that a Lorentz force is exerted to a charge although there is no relative motion between the magnet and the charge.

An essential step of solving the paradox is the realization that the inside of the conductive moving magnet is not field-free, but that a non-zero electric field strength $\vec E = -\vec v \times \vec B$ prevails there. If this field strength is integrated along the line $\overline{\mathrm{BC}}$, the result is the desired induced voltage. However, the induced voltage is not localized in the oscilloscope, but in the magnet.

The equation $\vec E = -\vec v \times \vec B$ can be derived from the consideration that there is obviously no current-driving force acting on any section of the circuit. Since the absence of forces also applies in particular to the inside of the magnet, the total electromagnetic force for a charge $q$ located inside the magnet equals $\vec F_q = q \cdot (\vec E + \vec v_q \times \vec B) = \vec 0$. If we assume that the charge $q$ moves “slip-free” with the magnet ($\vec v_q = \vec v$), the following also applies: $q \cdot (\vec E + \vec v \times \vec B) = \vec 0$. The last equation, however, is mathematically equivalent to $\vec E = -\vec v \times \vec B$.

Finally, the following electric field strengths result for the various sections of the conductor loop:

Section $\overline{\mathrm{AB}}$ (conductor)	Section $\overline{\mathrm{BC}}$ (magnet)	Section $\overline{\mathrm{CD}}$ (conductor)	Section $\overline{\mathrm{DA}}$ (oscilloscope)
$E = 0$	$\vec E = -\vec v \times \vec B = v \cdot B \cdot \vec e_y$	$E = 0$	$E = 0$

To check whether the outcome of the experiment is compatible with Maxwell's equations, we first write down the Maxwell Faraday equation in integral notation:

$$\oint\limits_{\partial A}\vec E\cdot\mathrm{d}\vec s = -\!\!\iint\limits_{A} \frac{\partial \vec B}{\partial t} \cdot\mathrm{d}\vec A$$

Here $A$ is the induction surface, and $\partial A$ is its boundary curve, which is assumed to be composed of the (stationary) sections $\overline{\mathrm{AB}}$, $\overline{\mathrm{BC}}$, $\overline{\mathrm{CD}}$ and $\overline{\mathrm{DA}}$, respectively. The dot $\cdot$ indicates the dot product between two vectors. The direction of integration (clockwise) and the surface orientation (pointing into the screen) are right-handed to each other as assumed in the Maxwell Faraday equation.

Considering the electrical field strengths shown in the table, the left side of the Maxwell Faraday equation can be written as:

$$\oint\limits_{\partial A}\vec E\cdot\mathrm{d}\vec s = \underbrace{\int\limits_{\mathrm{A}}^{\mathrm{B}}\vec E\cdot\mathrm{d}\vec s}_{=0} + \underbrace{\int\limits_{\mathrm{B}}^{\mathrm{C}}\vec E\cdot\mathrm{d}\vec s}_{=-v \cdot B \cdot L} + \underbrace{\int\limits_{\mathrm{C}}^{\mathrm{D}}\vec E\cdot\mathrm{d}\vec s}_{=0} + \underbrace{\int\limits_{\mathrm{D}}^{\mathrm{A}}\vec E\cdot\mathrm{d}\vec s}_{=0} = -v \cdot B \cdot L$$

The minus sign is due to the fact that the direction of integration is opposite to the direction of the electric field strength ($\angle(\mathrm{d}\vec s, \vec E) = 180^\circ$).

To calculate the right-hand side of the equation, we state that within the time $\mathrm{d}t$ the magnetic field of the induction surface increases from $0$ to $B$ ($\partial B = B$) within a strip of length $L$ and width $v\cdot \mathrm{d}t$ ($\mathrm{d}A = L \cdot v \cdot \mathrm{d}t$). Thus the right side of the equation equals

$$-\iint\limits_{A} \frac{\partial \vec B}{\partial t} \cdot\mathrm{d}\vec A = -\frac{B}{\mathrm{d}t} \cdot L \cdot v \cdot \mathrm{d}t = -v \cdot B \cdot L$$

The right and left sides of the equation are obviously identical. This shows that Hering's paradox is in perfect agreement with the Maxwell Faraday equation.

Note that the speed of the boundary curve $\partial A$ has no physical importance whatsoever. This can be seen most easily in the differential notation $\mathrm{rot} \vec E = -\dot \vec B$ of the Maxwell-Faraday equation where neither the induction area nor its boundary occurs. From a mathematical point of view, the boundary curve is just an imaginary line that had to be introduced to convert the Maxwell-Faraday equation to its integral notation such as to establish a relationship to electrical voltages. Because the boundary curve is physically of no importance, the outcome of an experiment does not depends on the speed of this curve and it is not affected by whether or not the speed of the boundary curve corresponds to the speed of a conductor wire being located at the same place. For reasons of simplicity, the speed of the boundary curve is assumed to be zero in this article. The movement that actually counts is the movement of the (electrically conducting) magnet. It affects the value of the electric field strength inside the magnet and is thus accounted for in the Maxwell-Faraday equation via the numerical value of the vector field $\vec E$.

=== Pitfalls ===
The difficulties in understanding Hering's paradox and similar problems are usually based on three misunderstandings:

(1) the lack of distinction between the velocity of the boundary curve and the velocity of a conductor present at the location of the boundary curve,
(2) the uncertainty as to whether the term $\partial A$ in the Maxwell-Faraday equation is just an imaginary boundary line or a conductor (correct is: $\partial A$ is a boundary curve without any physical properties) and
(3) ignoring the fact that in an ideal conductor moving in a magnetic field with flux density $\vec B$, there is a non-zero electric field strength $\vec E = -\vec v \times \vec B$.

If these points are consistently considered, Hering's paradox turns out to be in perfect agreement to Faraday's law of induction (given by the Maxwell Faraday equation) viewed from any frame of reference whatsoever. Furthermore, the difficulties in understanding the (thought) experiments described in the chapter "Exceptions to the flow rule" in the "Feynman Lectures" are due to the same misunderstandings.
