= Joseph Hippolyt Pulte =

American physician

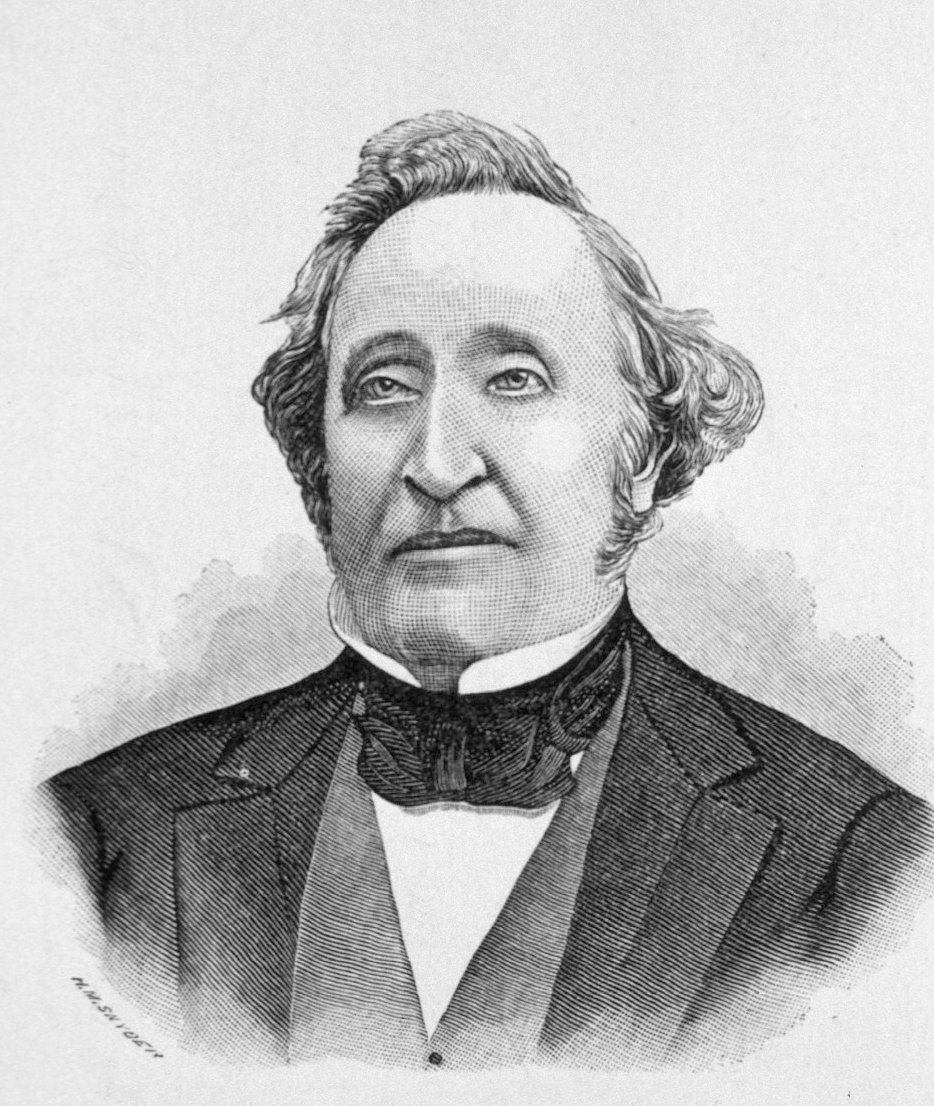
Joseph Hippolyt Pulte

Joseph Hippolyt Pulte (born in Meschede, Westphalia, Confederation of the Rhine, October 6, 1811 – died in Cincinnati, Ohio, February 24, 1884) was a homeopathic physician.

== Biography ==
He was educated in the gymnasium of Soest and received his medical degree at the University of Hamburg. He followed his brother, Dr. Hermann Pulte, to the United States in 1834, and practised in Cherrytown, Pennsylvania, but became a convert to homeopathy, and took an active interest in forming the homœopathic academy in Allentown, Pennsylvania, which closed in 1840.

He then moved to Cincinnati, where, in 1844, he co-founded the American Institute of Homeopathy in New York City. In 1872, he established in the medical college that bears his name in Cincinnati, where he was professor of clinical medicine. In 1852, he was made professor of the same branch at the Homeopathic College of Cleveland, where he served as professor of obstetrics in 1853–55.

== Plagiarism ==
Pulte was accused of plagiarism by J. W. Metcalf in The North American Journal of Homeopathy, in 1851. According to Metcalf, Pulte's book Homeopathic Domestic Physician published in 1850 was a copy and paste job from the works of Christoph Wilhelm Hufeland and others with parallel columns of text being almost identical. Metcalf also accused Pulte of plagiarizing entire sections of Constantine Hering's Domestic Physician (1835), Joseph Laurie's Domestic Medicine, Gottlieb Heinrich Georg Jahr's Manual, Erastus Edgerton Marcy's Theory and Practice (1850) and Calvin Cutter's Treatise on Anatomy, Physiology and Hygiene (1850).

== Selected publications ==
- Organon der Weltgeschichte (Cincinnati, 1846; English ed., 1859)
- The Homœopathic Domestic Physician (1850, 1871)
- A Reply to Dr. Metcalf (1851)
- The Science of Medicine (Cleveland, 1852)
- The Woman's Medical Guide (Cincinnati, 1853)
- Civilization and its Heroes: an Oration (1855)

He contributed to various homeopathic journals, was an editor of the American Magazine of Homeopathy and Hydropathy in 1852–54, and of the Quarterly Homeopathic Magazine in 1854. He edited Teste's Diseases of Children, translated by Emma H. Cote (2d ed., Cincinnati, 1857).
