= Corresta T. Canfield =

19th-century American physician

Corresta T. Canfield Knapp
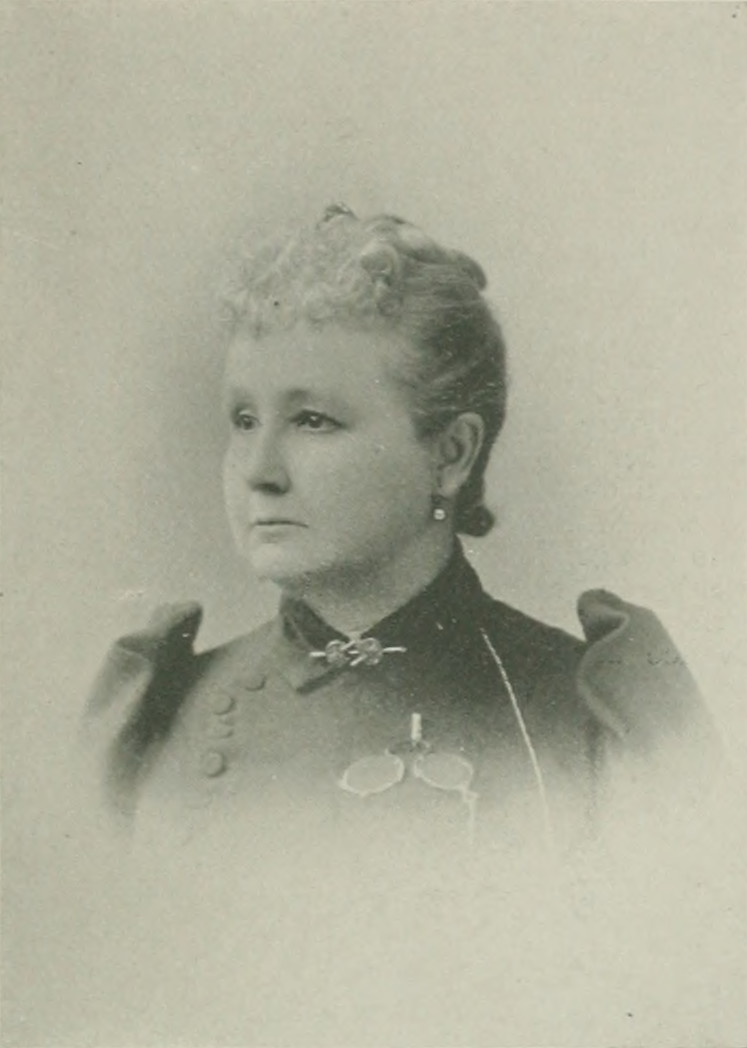
- Born: 1883; Chardon, Ohio
- Died: 1920 (aged 36–37); Pittsburg, Kansas
- Education: Woman's Homeopathic College of Cleveland
- Occupations: physician, professor

Corresta Thisba Canfield Knapp (March 6, 1833 – May 1, 1920) was an American physician from Ohio. She was the first woman to serve as an officer of the American Institute of Homeopathy.

== Early years and education ==
Corresta Thisba Canfield was born in Chardon, Ohio in 1833. The Canfields, for meritorious service, received from the king of England, in 1350, a grant of land on the river Cam, in Yorkshire, and settled there. After occupying that grant for 300 years, they came to the United States, shortly after the arrival of the Plymouth Pilgrims, and were among the first settlers of New Haven, Connecticut. Canfield was descended from French Huguenots and New England Presbyterians.

From her childhood, Canfield reportedly had ambitions of being a physician. She entered the Chardon seminary at an early age.

== Career ==
Canfield married Franklin Knapp on November 26, 1849, and had three children. After the birth of her last child, she taught school for several years.

Widowed and without resources at the close of the American Civil War, in 1869, she entered the Woman's Homeopathic College of Cleveland, Ohio. With the help of a half-year's scholarship, Canfield finished the first college year. In the second year, she became an assistant of the president, Dr. Myra K. Merrick, in order to financially support herself in college. She graduated with first honors in 1871, having served as demonstrator of anatomy. During the following summer, she practiced in Fort Wayne, Indiana, earning enough to enable her to enter the Men's Homeopathic College of Cleveland, Ohio. While there, she was demonstrator of anatomy in the woman's department, and practiced enough, visiting patients mornings and evenings, to defray expenses. She attended all the lectures, passed through the whole curriculum and was graduated in 1872, third in the men's course. The faculty acknowledged that she was entitled to a prize, but would not establish a precedent by awarding it to a practicing physician.

As a medical doctor, Canfield practiced in Cleveland for a few months, before she settled in Titusville, Pennsylvania. Having but US$15.00 capital, she borrowed enough to buy out a resident physician and was able to pay all her debts the first year. She remained there for nearly ten years. She next spent a year in traveling. In 1882, she settled in Chicago, where she has built up a large practice and served in public offices. She was also appointed and held the position of professor of anatomy, in the Woman's Medical College.

Canfield sat on the board of censors of the American Institute of Homeopathy, having been elected for the second time. She was the first woman who served in that capacity. One was elected the previous year but was prohibited from serving on the board of censors. Three years before her admission, women were not permitted to join that society. After a time, seeing no other women actively represented in the society, she felt that, to enjoy its privileges, one should assume its duties. She, therefore, prepared a paper and read it before the institute. She served as president, vice-president, secretary and treasurer of the Woman's Medical Association of Chicago, vice-president of the Hahnemann Clinic for two years, and was appointed to the woman's committee for a homeopathic congress during the World's Columbian Exposition in 1893.

== Death ==
Canfield died in Pittsburg, Kansas, in 1920.
