= Carl Hering =

American engineer (1860–1926)

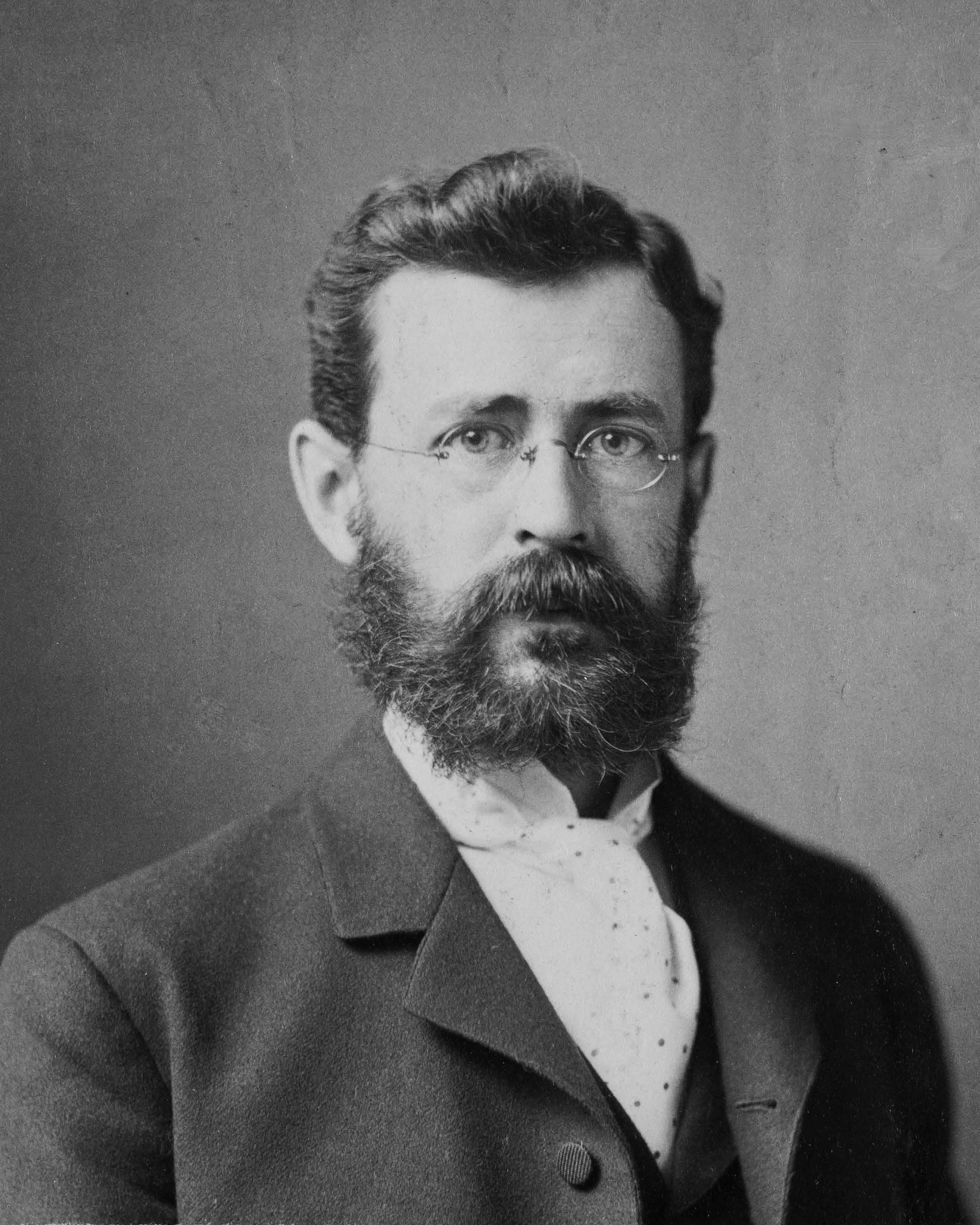
- Hering circa 1885
- Born: March 19, 1860; Philadelphia, Pennsylvania, U.S.
- Died: May 10, 1926 (aged 66); Philadelphia, Pennsylvania, U.S.
- Education: University of Pennsylvania, U.S.; Technische Universität Darmstadt, Germany
- Occupation: Electrical engineer

Carl Hering (19 March 1860 – 10 May 1926) was an American engineer involved in studies on electric batteries and electric furnaces. He also conducted experiments to study electromagnetic induction, uncovering a flaw in the fundamental law as it was understood at the time.

== Biography ==
He was one of the sons of Constantine Hering, a pioneer of homeopathy in the United States. He studied mechanical engineering at the University of Pennsylvania in Philadelphia, where he earned his Bachelor's degree in 1880 and then stayed on to teach mathematics and mechanical engineering. In 1883, he began his studies in electrical engineering as Erasmus Kittler's first assistant at the Faculty of Electrical Engineering of TU Darmstadt, Germany, where the first chair of electrical engineering had been created the year before.

Upon his return to Philadelphia in 1886, he founded a consulting firm that he continued until his death, specializing in work on electric furnaces and electrolysis, electrochemical and electrophysical processes. In 1887, he obtained his Master of Science also at the University of Philadelphia. In 1889, he participated in the World Exposition in Paris on behalf of the American government and around 1890, he studied the possibility of making electric batteries, obtaining several patents on the subject.

In 1902, together with E. F. Roeber, C. J. Reed, and J. W. Richards, he founded the American Electrochemical Society, of which he was president from 1906 to 1907. He was appointed officer of Public Education by the French government in 1889 and decorated a Knight of the Legion of Honor in 1891.

In 1908, Carl Hering developed an experiment on electromagnetic induction to study its fundamental laws, an experiment similar to later Blondel's experiments.

== Honors and awards ==
- 1891: Knight of the Order of the Legion of Honor

== Bibliography ==
- Rechcigl Jr., Miloslav (February 17, 2021). American Men and Women in Medicine, Applied Sciences and Engineering With Roots in Czechoslovakia: Practitioners - Educators - Specialists - Researchers. Bloomington (IN): AuthorHouse. ISBN 978-1665514989.
- "Carl Hering". ElectroChemicalSociety.
- Hartmut Grabinski: Der Heringsche Versuch: Mythen und Fakten (1908). In: Electrical engineering 1997, Band 80, Nr. 5, S. 285–290, ISSN 0948-7921

== See also ==
- Hering's Paradox
- Maxwell–Lodge effect
- Riccardo Felici
