= Felici's law =

In physics, Felici's law states that the net charge through a circuit induced by a changing magnetic field is directly proportional to the difference between the initial and final magnetic flux. The proportionality constant is the electrical conductance $G = \frac{1}{R}$. This law is a predecessor of the modern Faraday's law of induction.

For a circuit with resistance $R$, the total charge passing through the circuit from time 0 to time t is

$$Q(t) = \frac{1}{R} [\Phi_B(0) - \Phi_B(t)]$$,

where $\Phi_B(t)$ is the magnetic flux.

== History ==
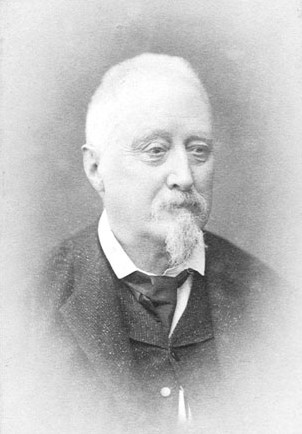
Photograph of Riccardo Felici (1819-1902), Italian mathematician and physicist

Felici's law is named after Riccardo Felici, an Italian physicist and rector of the University of Pisa between 1851 and 1859. His research was primarily focused on induction and magnetic effects.

Inspired by the mathematical formulation of electromagnetic induction of Franz Ernst Neumann and Wilhelm Eduard Weber, he published in 1854 an extensive experimental treaty on the phenomenon. He came up with his law, that he restated clearly in 1856.

Felici's experiments were important for the development of modern formulation of Faraday's law of induction and Maxwell's equations. James Clerk Maxwell cited Felici's work in both of his key papers, A Dynamical Theory of the Electromagnetic Field of 1865 and in A Treatise on Electricity and Magnetism in 1873.

== Derivation from Faraday's law of induction ==
Faraday's law of induction states that the induced electromotive force is,

$$\mathcal{E} = -\frac{d\Phi_B}{dt}$$

By charge conservation, the charge passing through the circuit is,

$$\begin{align}
Q(t) &= \int_0^t I\,d\tau\\
&= \int_0^t \frac{\mathcal{E}}{R}\,d\tau \\
&= \frac{1}{R}\int_0^t -\frac{d\Phi_B}{dt} \,d\tau \\
&= \frac{1}{R} [\Phi(0) - \Phi(t)]
\end{align}$$

where I is the electric current.

== Applications ==
Since the charge depends only on the total change in magnetic flux during the time, and not any instantaneous result, we can apply Felici's law to measure the magnetic flux and thus a constant magnetic field. In the flip-coil method, we wind 'n' overlapping loops in a small ring. We first insert the coil perpendicular to the field and then rotate it 180°. Thus the end magnetic flux is exactly opposite the initial flux since the magnetic field is constant. By Felici's law, for area A and resistance R, we can find the magnetic field B:

$$\begin{align}
Q &= \frac{\Delta \Phi}{R}\\
&= \frac{2 \Phi}{R}\\
&= \frac{2 B n A}{R}\\
B &= \frac{R Q}{2 n A}
\end{align}$$

Thus, we can calculate the magnetic field based on the measured charge that flows through the coil.
