= American Institute of Homeopathy =

- Abbreviation: AIH
- Formation: 1844
- Purpose: Professional association
- Fields: Homeopathy
- Official language: English
- Key people: Royal S. Copeland; Joseph Hippolyt Pulte; Roy Upham

The American Institute of Homeopathy (AIH), established in 1844, is the oldest extant national physician's organization in the United States.

The founding president of the AIH was Constantine Hering. Past AIH presidents include Royal S. Copeland and Bushrod Washington James. Corresta T. Canfield was the first woman to serve as an officer of the American Institute of Homeopathy.

In 1900, the association was granted permission by the U.S. Congress to establish the Samuel Hahnemann Monument on Scott Circle in Washington, D.C.
