= Riccardo Felici =

Italian physicist (1819–1902)

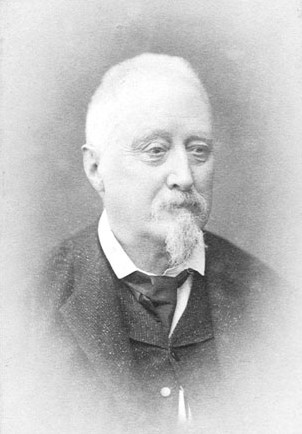
- Born: 11 June 1819; Parma, Duchy of Parma and Piacenza
- Died: 20 July 1902 (aged 83); Lucca, Kingdom of Italy
- Education: University of Pisa
- Known for: Felici's law
- Spouse: Elisa Frullini (m. 1854)
- Scientific career
- Fields: Physics
- Workplaces: University of Pisa

Riccardo Felici (11 June 1819 – 20 July 1902) was a physicist and Italian professor of the University of Pisa. He is best known for the electrodynamics law that bears his name, through which the total charge passing through a circuit subject to an induced current can be calculated as the difference between the final and initial flux of the magnetic field, divided by the electrical resistance of the circuit. Felici anticipated, by almost fifty years, the experiments by André Blondel in 1914, in his search for the general law of magnetic induction.

== Biography ==
Riccardo Felici was born in Parma, in the Duchy of Parma and Piacenza in 1819.

Amidst many financial difficulties, he managed, at the age of 20, to go to Pisa to study at university. Initially oriented towards engineering studies, he devoted himself to physics research under the guidance of Carlo Matteucci. Appointed his assistant in 1846, he was then an adjunct professor at the Faculty of Natural Sciences, continuing to substitute Matteucci, who was engaged in politics. In 1859, he became a full professor and director of the university's Physics Cabinet, completely replacing Matteucci, who would later become minister. In 1849–50, he was appointed professor of physics and in 1851 undertook the systematic study of electromagnetic induction phenomena. He also dealt with problems in optics. In Pisa, he devoted himself to the care of physics students, creating one of the first and most renowned schools of physics after the unification of Italy.

In 1849, he took part in the Battle of Curtatone together with Ottaviano Fabrizio Mossotti, Carlo Matteucci, Leopoldo Pilla and Gaetano Giorgini.

He married Elisa Frullini in 1854, from whom he had one daughter, Isabella. From 1870 to 1882 he was rector of the University of Pisa in alternating years. A member of various scientific academies and of the Accademia dei Lincei (1875), towards the end of his life he directed, together with Enrico Betti, the journal Il Nuovo Cimento (from 1893 to 1900), which he owned and bequeathed to the newly founded Italian Physical Society.

Felici's law was formulated in the years when Franz Ernst Neumann, Wilhelm Eduard Weber, Hermann von Helmholtz, Emil Lenz and others were studying the phenomenon of induction.

He died in S. Alessio di Lucca on June the 11th 1902 and was commemorated on December the 2nd at the Accademia dei Lincei by his student and later university lecturer Antonio Roiti.

Also in 1902, Angelo Battelli, who replaced him in 1893 as chair of physics and director of the Physics Institute at the University of Pisa, commemorated him in the journal Il Nuovo Cimento.

In the Notizie sull'Istituto di Fisica sperimentale dello Studio Pisano (News on the Institute of Experimental Physics of the Pisan Study) of 1914, Augusto Occhialini reports on the aforementioned commemoration of Angelo Battelli, a beautiful biography of him is sketched, with a drawing of Felici's famous switch, and the episode, as epic as it is curious, relating to the search with physical methods for the bullet that remained, after the wound suffered at Aspromonte, in Giuseppe Garibaldi's malleolus, which was brought to Pisa in 1862 to try to extract it. Using two copper rods mounted on a block of bone terminating in two very thin silver plates, connected to a battery and a galvanometer, Felici was able to work out whether or not the probe touched the bullet, identifying it.

Felici's experiments are cited in James Clerk Maxwell's 1865 "A Dynamical Theory of the Electromagnetic Field", which led to the formulation of Maxwell's equations for electromagnetism.

== Main publications ==
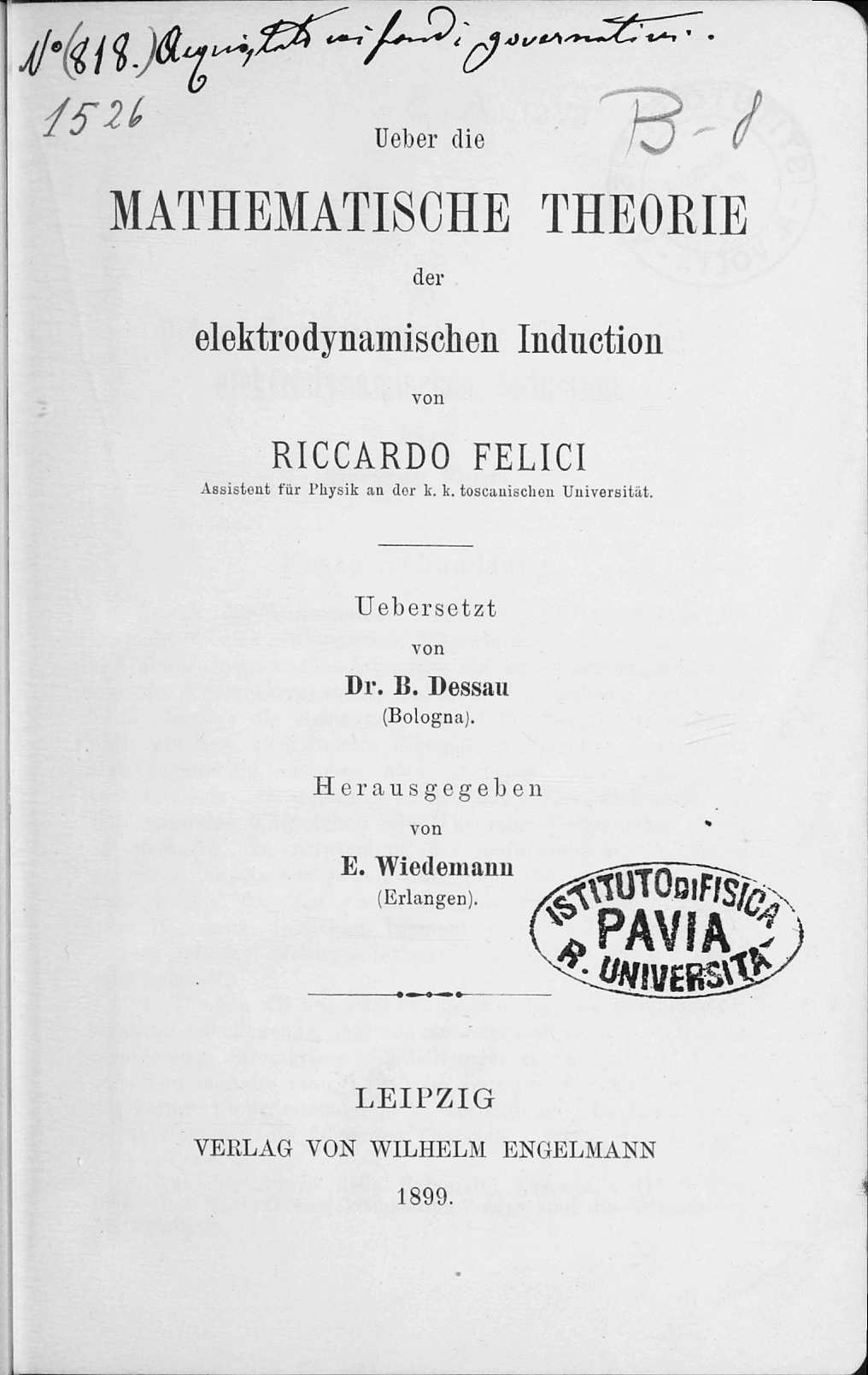
Über die mathematische Theorie der elektrodynamischen Induction, 1899

- R. Felici, Ricerche sulle leggi generali della induzione elettro-dinamica, Il Nuovo Cimento, 1 (1855), 325–341.
- R. Felici, Esperienze sopra un caso di correnti indotte, nel quale sarebbero nulle le forze elettro-dinamiche esercitate dal conduttore inducente sopra l'indotto qualora fosse percorso da una corrente, Il Nuovo Cimento, 2 (1855), 321–329.
- R. Felici, Sulla legge di Lenz, e sopra alcune recenti esperienze del prof. Matteucci sull'induzione elettro-dinamica, Il Nuovo Cimento, 3 (1856), 198–208.
- R. Felici, Esperienza sopra un caso singolare della induzione elettrodinamica, Il Nuovo Cimento, 9 (1859), 75–81.
- R. Felici, Nota sopra una osservazione del Sig. A. De La Rive ad una delle esperienze fondamentali della teoria dell'induzione elettrodinamica, Il Nuovo Cimento, 9 (1859), 345–347.
- R. Felici, Esperienze che dimostrano che quando un corpo ruota sotto la influenza di una calamita, la forza che, in virtù delle correnti indotte, si sviluppa fra la calamita e il corpo indotto, è repulsiva o attrattiva a seconda della direzione del moto, Il Nuovo Cimento, 10 (1859), 5–12.
- R. Felici, Nota al precedente lavoro del Sig. Helmholtz, Il Nuovo Cimento, 6 (1871), 71–72.
- R. Felici, Esperienze sulle forze elettromotrici indotte da un solenoide chiuso, Il Nuovo Cimento, 9 (1873), 5–11.
- R. Felici, Sopra un nuovo interruttore e sul suo uso in alcune esperienze di induzione, Il Nuovo Cimento, 1874 (12), 115-140:
- R. Felici, Un'altra esperienza sulla rotazione del conduttore radiale, Il Nuovo Cimento, 13 (1875), 224–226.
- R. Felici, Sul potenziale di un conduttore in movimento sotto l'influenza di un magnete, Il Nuovo Cimento, 24 (1888), 32–40.
- On the mathematical theory of electrodynamic induction (in German). Leipzig: Wilhelm Engelmann. 1899.

== See also ==
- Electromagnetism
- Blondel's experiments

== Other projects ==
- Wikimedia Commons contains images or other files on Riccardo Felici
