= André Blondel =

French engineer and physicist (1863–1938)

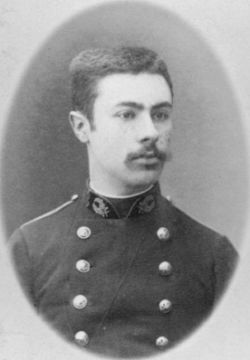
- André Blondel in 1888
- Born: 28 August 1863; Chaumont, Haute-Marne
- Died: 15 November 1938 (aged 75); Paris
- Education: École polytechnique, École des Ponts et Chaussées
- Known for: Blondel's experiments Blondel's theorem Lumen (unit); Oscillograph; Self-oscillation; Two reactions theory
- Awards: John Scott Medal (1898); Kelvin Gold Medal (1929); Faraday Medal (1937)
- Scientific career
- Fields: Physics
- Thesis: Sur la théorie des marées dans un canal : application à la Mer Rouge (1912)

André-Eugène Blondel (28 August 1863 – 15 November 1938) was a French engineer and physicist. He was the inventor of the electromechanical oscillograph and a system of photometric units of measurement.

== Life ==
Blondel was born in Chaumont, Haute-Marne, France. His father was a magistrate from an old family in the town of Dijon. He was the best student from the town in his year. He went on to attend the École nationale des ponts et chaussées (School of Bridges and Roadways) and graduated first in his class in 1888. He was employed as an engineer by the Lighthouses and Beacons Service until he retired in 1927 as its general first class inspector. He became a professor of electrotechnology at the School of Bridges and Highways and the School of Mines in Paris.

Very early in his career he suffered immobility due to a paralysis of his legs, which confined him to his room for 27 years, but he never stopped working.

In 1893 André Blondel sought to solve the problem of integral synchronization, using the theory proposed by Alfred Cornu. He determined the conditions under which the curve traced by a high-speed recording instrument would follow as closely as possible the actual variations of the physical phenomenon being studied.

This led him to invent the bifilar and soft iron oscillographs, and he also coined the term itself (see History of the oscilloscope). These instruments won the grand prize at the St. Louis Exposition in 1904. They were more powerful than the classical stroboscope, invented in 1891 then in use. They remained the best way to record high-speed electrical phenomena for more than 40 years when they were replaced by the cathode ray oscilloscope. They paved the way for a greater understanding of the behavior of alternating current.

Blondel built a theory of rectification with asymmetrical electrodes. He demonstrated that there were three kinds of electric arc: the primitive arc of William Duddell, the secondary arc of Valdemar Poulsen, and a succession of oscillatory discharges.

In 1892, he published a study on the coupling of synchronous generators on a large AC electric grid. This analysis had also been done a little earlier by another electrical engineer, Paul Boucherot, using a different approach, and the two authors arrived at similar conclusions.

In 1894 he proposed the lumen and other new measurement units for use in photometry, based on the metre and the Violle candle. He coined the names of the phot and the stilb around 1920.

In 1899, he published Empirical Theory of Synchronous Generators which contained the basic theory of the two armature reactions (direct and transverse). It was used extensively to explain the properties of salient-pole AC machines.

In 1909, assisted by M. Mähl, he worked on one of the first long distance schemes for the transmission of AC power. The project created a (then) large 300,000 hp hydroelectric power plant at Genissiat on the Rhône, and transmitted electrical power to Paris more than 350 km away using polyphase AC current at 120 kV.

In 1914 he performed a series of experiments in order to determine what was the most general law of electromagnetic induction.

He died in Paris on 15 November 1938.

== Honours and awards ==
Blondel was made a member of the French Academy of Sciences in 1913. He was appointed commander of the Légion d'honneur in 1927, and was awarded the Faraday Medal in 1937. He also received the medal of the Franklin Institute, the Montefiore award and Lord Kelvin award.

In 1942 Parry Moon proposed to rename the unit of luminance apostilb the blondel.

== Society ==
André Blondel was one of the founder members in 1930 of the Society of Friends of André-Marie Ampère which was created to develop the first science museum in France, the Ampère Museum close to Lyon.
