= Constantine Hering =

Saxony-born, American homeopathic physician (1800–1880)

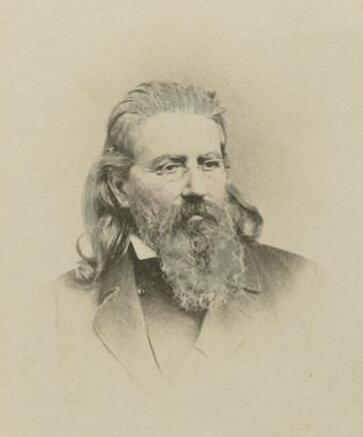
- Born: January 1, 1800; Oschatz, Electorate of Saxony
- Died: July 23, 1880 (aged 80); Philadelphia, Pennsylvania, U.S.
- Resting place: West Laurel Hill Cemetery, Bala Cynwyd, Pennsylvania, U.S.
- Occupations: Physician, Homeopath
- Spouse(s): Charlotte Kemper; Marianne Husman; Therese Buchheim
- Children: 13 including Carl Hering and Rudolph Hering
- Parents: Carl Gottlieb Hering; Christiane Friderike

Constantine J. Hering (January 1, 1800 – July 23, 1880) was a Saxony-born, American medical doctor who was a pioneer of homeopathy in the United States. In 1833, he co-founded the Hahnemannian Society in the United States dedicated to homeopathic medicine principles. In 1836, he founded the North American Academy of the Homeopathic Arts in Allentown, Pennsylvania, the first homeopathic school in the United States. In 1849, he co-founded the Homeopathic Medical College of Pennsylvania in Philadelphia. He served as the chair of the institutes of medicine and materia medica at Philadelphia College of Homeopathy from 1845 to 1869 and as professor of institutes and materia medica at Hahnemann Medical College from 1869 to 1871. He founded and served as the first president of the American Institute of Homeopathy and served as editor of several scientific journals and published multiple books on homeopathic medicine.

== Early life and education ==
Hering was born January 1, 1800, in Oschatz, Saxony, to Carl Gottleib Hering and Christiane Friderike. He attended the Classical School of Zittau and assembled a collection of herbs, minerals, and animal bones. He studied medicine at the Surgical Academy of Dresden and the University of Leipzig. He studied under Johann Lukas Schönlein at the University of Wurzburg and graduated in 1826 with a degree in medicine, obstetrics, and surgery. He was engaged to write a book disproving homeopathy, but after reading Samuel Hahnemann's works and investigating homeopathy's clinical claims for himself he became convinced of its efficacy. He sought out the author, and they became personal friends. He also became an advocate for homeopathy due to self treatment of an infected finger with low doses of arsenic which prevented a recommended amputation.

He worked as an instructor of mathematics and natural science at an institute in Dresden. He received a commission from the King of Saxony to travel to Surinam to collect botanical and zoological specimens. He was in Surinam for six years. He practiced medicine in Paramaribo, spent time in a leper colony to study the use of homeopathic treatment, and studied the local snakes and treatment of their bites with radiant heat. Upon his travels home, his ship was damaged off the coast of Rhode Island and docked at Martha's Vineyard in January 1833. He traveled to Philadelphia and began the practice of medicine.

== Career ==
In 1833, Hering and several colleagues founded the Hahnemannian Society, the first formal organization dedicated toward the principles of homeopathic medicine in the United States.

He founded a homeopathic school in the United States, the first of its kind in any country. In 1836, the Pennsylvania Legislature incorporated the college as the North American Academy of the Homeopathic Arts in Allentown, Pennsylvania. The school was short-lived and ceased instructions in 1839 and the school buildings were sold in 1849.

In 1849, Hering, Jacob Jeanes, and Walter Williamson petitioned the Pennsylvania Legislature to incorporate the Homeopathic Medical College of Pennsylvania in Philadelphia.

From 1845 until 1869 he served as chair of institutes of medicine and materia medica in the Philadelphia College of Homeopathy. He studied cures for the bites of venomous snakes and for hydrophobia, and developed many of Hahnemann's theories. In 1869, the Philadelphia College of Homeopathy merged with Hahnemann Medical College and Hering served as professor of institutes and materia medica from 1869 to 1871.

He introduced a number of homeopathic remedies to the materia medica, including Lachesis, Psorinum and Glonoinum.

He founded and served as the first president of the American Institute of Homeopathy. He was joint editor of the Medical Correspondent (Allentown, 1835–1836), of the Miscellanies of Homeopathy (Philadelphia, 1839), of the North American Homœopathic Quarterly (New York, 1851–1852), and of the Homœopathic News (1854), and founded and edited the American Journal of Homœopathic Materia Medica.

He died of a heart attack July 23, 1880, in Philadelphia, and was interred at West Laurel Hill Cemetery in Bala Cynwyd, Pennsylvania.

== Personal life ==
He was married in Surinam in 1828 to Charlotte Kemper and together they had a son. Charlotte died in 1831 and Hering left the son with grandparents when he moved to the United States. He was married a second time in 1834 to Marrianne Husman of Philadelphia and together had four children. Marianne died in 1842 and he was married a third time in 1845 to Therese Buchheim whom he met while visiting his father in Germany. Together they had eight children including the engineer Carl Hering and civil engineer Rudolph Hering. His nephew was the physiologist Ewald Hering.

== Publications ==
- A Concise View of the Rise and Progress of Homoeopathic Medicine, Philadelphia: The Hahnemannian Society, 1833
- The homoeopathist (1835-1838) (Digital German edition by the University and State Library Düsseldorf)
- Effects of Snake Poison (1837) / Wirkungen des Schlangengiftes . Blumer, Allentaun [Pa.] 1837 Digital edition by the University and State Library Düsseldorf
- Samuel Hahnemann's Organon of Homœopathic Medicine, New York: William Radde, 1849
- Domestic Physician (1851)
- American Drug Provings (vol. i., Leipsic, 1853)
- Materia Medica, Philadelphia: Boericke & Tafel, 1873
- Analytical Repetory of the Symptoms of the Mind, Philadelphia: The American Homœopathic Publishing Society, 1881
