= Tinius =

Tinius is a Norwegian name. It may serve as either a given name or as a surname. Individuals with the name Tinius have included the following:

- G. R. Tinius, Kansas-Oklahoma Minister (Christianity) in Churches of Christ
- Tinius Olsen, Norwegian-born American engineer and inventor
- Tinius Nagell-Erichsen, Norwegian journalist and publisher
