= Milanuncios =

Spanish website for online classified advertisements

- Available in: Spanish
- Website: www.milanuncios.com

Milanuncios.com is a Spanish website used for online classified advertisements.

The service of Milanuncios consists of insertion of ads, created by the users of the website, in the portal milanuncios.com. This way Milanuncios helps to connect advertisers with those interested in the ad.

So far, the company has only focused on the Spanish market.

In 2014, Milanuncios SL was acquired by Schibsted.

== History ==
Since its creation in September 2005, Milanuncios' growth was organic focusing on user experience.

By 2012, Milanuncios.com had become a popular Spanish website for online classifieds:

- 11 million visitors per month compared to 8.2 M of segundamano.es
- 23 million visits per month, 64% more than segundamano.es
- The users of milanuncios.com were spending a total of 364 million minutes on the site in the month of June 2012 — almost doubling the time spent on the site by users of segundamano.es

The portal belongs 100% to Milanuncios SL, a Spanish company that was financed without external capital injection.

In early 2014, SCM Spain (Schibsted Classified Media Spain) announced the agreement to acquired Milanuncios. The acquisition was completed in the end of 2014.

== Sections ==
Milanuncios is divided into 16 different sections:

- Motor
- Health and Beauty
- Jobs
- Real Estate
- Pets
- Services
- Business and Industrial
- Computers and Software
- Phones
- Home and Garden
- Sports
- Image and Sound
- Fashion and Accessories
- Hobbies
- Books and Education
- Contacts.

The website allows publishing of ads subject to the Terms and conditions.

Milanuncios' most important section is Motor followed by Goods. With 372k vehicle ads in August 2012, Milanuncios was ahead of its competitors in the Spanish market, segundamano.es with 246k ads, and also the specialized motors vertical coches.net (120k ads).

Milanuncios helps to connect advertisers with those interested in the ad but does not mediate between the parties. Therefore, users need to be cautious in their interactions and transactions. As a general norm, the webpage recommends not to pay before receiving the product or service and users should meet in person to close the transaction. The website offers a series of simple filters to facilitate local searches.

== Competitors ==
The main competitors of Milanuncios are vibbo.com (former segundamano.es and Milanuncios has bought this website), tablondeanuncios.com, clasf.es, anuncios.eBay.es, wallapop.com, UnAnuncio.es, poneranuncios.com, anuncialoquequieras.com, mundoanuncio.com and campusanuncios.com.

Milanuncios.com has a market share of around 50% followed by segundamano.es with a share close to 30% in June 2012. Segundamano was bought by Schibsted in 2006, a Norwegian media group.

In Spain, the brand Milanuncios (also known as mil anuncios or 1000 anuncios) became very strong among internet users and has overtaken not only segundamano, but also eBay.
