= Oleona, Pennsylvania =

Unincorporated community in Pennsylvania, US

- Unincorporated community
- Location within Pennsylvania Location within the United States
- Coordinates: 41°33′22″N 77°42′06″W
- Country: United States
- State: Pennsylvania
- County: Potter
- Township: Stewardson
- Founded: 1852
- Elevation: 1,335 ft (407 m)
- Time zone: UTC-5 (Eastern (EST))
  - Summer (DST): UTC-4 (EDT)
- GNIS feature ID: 1214042

Oleona, originally spelled Oleana, is an unincorporated community in Stewardson Township, Potter County, Pennsylvania, United States, situated in the Kettle Creek valley at the intersection of PA Route 44 and PA Route 144. The community was established in 1852 by the Norwegian violinist Ole Bull as part of a short-lived utopian colony intended to provide a home for Scandinavian immigrants. The colony's rapid failure became the subject of the well-known satirical song "Oleana." Much of the original colony land is now part of Ole Bull State Park.

== History ==
=== Ole Bull Colony ===
In 1852, Ole Bull, then at the height of his fame as a concert violinist in the United States, purchased 11,144 acres in southern Potter County for $10,388, with the intention of founding a colony for Norwegian immigrants. He named it "New Norway" and engaged New York attorney John Hopper (son of Isaac Hopper) and local land agent John F. Cowan as partners in a development corporation. Bull contributed $25,000 to the operating company and commissioned surveyor Robert Hamilton to lay out four planned towns in the Kettle Creek valley: Oleana, New Bergen (at present-day Carter Camp), New Norway, and Valhalla, the last sited on the highest point where Bull planned to build his own residence.

Bull arrived in Coudersport on September 5, 1852. Two days later, a first contingent of thirty Norwegian settlers joined him, with 105 more arriving within weeks. At a formal inauguration on September 8, Bull declared: "We are here to found a new Norway, dedicated to freedom and independence, and protected by the glorious flag of America." Over the following year, an estimated 300 to 800 settlers arrived from both Norway and Norwegian communities in the American Midwest. Workers constructed a hotel, schoolhouses, cabins, a steam sawmill, and two water mills.

=== Collapse ===
The colony encountered serious difficulties almost immediately. By the first snowfall in November 1852, deep snows had blocked the road to Coudersport, roughly thirty miles away, and supplies dwindled. Twelve settlers died during the first winter. The hilly terrain and poor soil proved largely unsuitable for agriculture.

In May 1853, a further blow emerged: it was discovered that the land deed excluded three key parcels totalling over 650 acres—the fertile valley bottoms where agriculture was actually feasible, including the sites of Oleana itself and Bull's own planned residence, which remained the property of Cowan. The New York Times reported that Bull did not hold clear title to much of the land he had sold to settlers. Wages went unpaid for months as Bull attempted to raise funds through concert tours, but his touring income had dropped sharply.

By the spring of 1854, most settlers had departed, many relocating to Norwegian communities in Wisconsin and Michigan. Bull is estimated to have lost between $40,000 and $70,000 on the venture.

=== Aftermath ===
A small number of settlers remained. German immigrants subsequently moved into the area. Norwegian settler John Henry Andresen purchased the Oleana Hotel in 1856 and lived in the community until his death in 1890, also operating a grist mill, two sawmills, and the post office. The Olson family operated the Olson Lodge well into the twentieth century.

In the 1920s, the Commonwealth of Pennsylvania acquired much of the former colony land and established Ole Bull State Park, a 132-acre (53 ha) park in the Kettle Creek valley. The ruins of the retaining wall beneath Bull's unfinished residence are maintained within the park, and a Pennsylvania Historical and Museum Commission marker commemorates the colony. A monument honouring Bull was placed in the park in 2002 on the 150th anniversary of the colony's founding.

== "Oleana" (song) ==
The colony's failure became widely known in Norway and inspired the satirical song "Oleana", published on March 5, 1853, by Ditmar Meidell. The song mocked the extravagant promises made to prospective emigrants about life in the colony. Norwegian songwriter Erik Bye later included it in his repertoire, and an English-language version was popularised by Pete Seeger, formerly of The Weavers.

== See also ==
- Ole Bull
- Ole Bull State Park
- Oleanna (song)
- Norwegian Americans
