= Peugeot Polygon =

Overview
- Production: 2025

Body and chassis
- Class: Urban vehicle (B)
- Related: Peugeot Inception

The Peugeot Polygon is an urban vehicle (B-segment), which was officially revealed in November 2025, set to preview the design of the next generation Peugeot 208.
