= Ole Bull State Park =

State park in Pennsylvania, United States

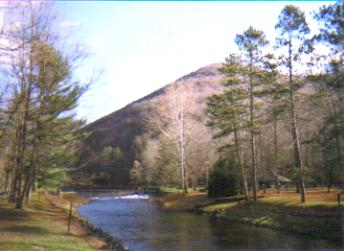
- Kettle Creek flowing through Ole Bull State Park

- Location within Pennsylvania Location within the United States
- Interactive map of Ole Bull State Park
- Location: Potter County, Pennsylvania, United States
- Coordinates: 41°32′14″N 77°42′56″W
- Area: 132 acres (53 ha)
- Elevation: 1,417 feet (432 m)
- Established: 1925
- Administrator: Pennsylvania Department of Conservation and Natural Resources
- Named for: Ole Borneman Bull
- Website: Official website
- Pennsylvania State Parks

Ole Bull State Park is a 132-acre (53 ha) Pennsylvania state park in Stewardson Township, Potter County, Pennsylvania in the United States. The park is located on Pennsylvania Route 144, 26 miles (42 km) north of Renovo and 18 miles (29 km) south of Galeton. Ole Bull State Park is in the Kettle Creek Valley, and is surrounded by Susquehannock State Forest. The woods surrounding the park are called the Black Forest because of its once dense tree cover.

== History ==
=== New Norway ===
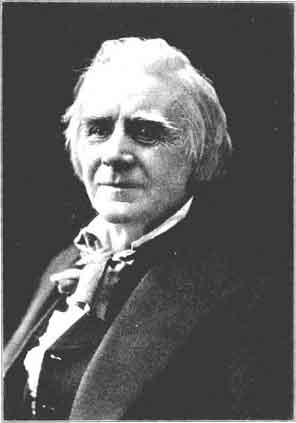
Ole Bull

Ole Bull State Park is named for Ole Borneman Bull. Ole Bull was a famous Norwegian violinist. He visited the United States several times and played with great success. While visiting the United States, Bull became interested in founding a colony for his fellow countrymen. In 1852, he purchased 120,000 acres (49,000 ha) of land for $10,000 in Pennsylvania and founded the colony, which was called New Norway. He established four communities, New Bergen (now known as Carter Camp), Oleona, New Norway, and Valhalla in the Kettle Creek area. Ole Bull began work on a "castle", which he named Nordenskjold. The castle and the communities were abandoned in less than a year. The problems encountered by the Norwegian pioneers were mainly based on the inexperience of the farmers in dealing with clearing the land of its many trees. Efforts to settle the area were parodied in the 1853 Norwegian folk song Oleanna, which was translated into English and popularized by Pete Seeger in 1955. The Norwegians, however, did not give up. They migrated west into Minnesota and the Dakotas. The settlement may have failed, but Ole Bull was not forgotten. The citizens of Norway paid for the construction of a monument to honor Ole Bull. The statue was placed in the park on the 150th anniversary of New Norway in 2002.

=== Lumber Era ===
The Kettle Creek area was part of the massive lumbering operation that occurred in most of north central Pennsylvania in the 1880s and 1890s. The lumbering industry harvested the old-growth white pine and hemlock. Two railroads were built on the banks of Kettle Creek to haul the timber to sawmills in the Cross Fork area. The old-growth forest was soon gone. The land was no longer useful to the lumber industry and it fell into disuse. The Commonwealth of Pennsylvania purchased much of the land and Ole Bull State Park was opened in 1925.

=== Civilian Conservation Corps ===
Many of the facilities at Ole Bull State Park were constructed during the Great Depression by the Civilian Conservation Corps founded by American President Franklin D. Roosevelt. The CCC created many jobs for the out of work industrial workers from throughout the United States. Ole Bull State Park is home to many examples of the work of the Civilian Conservation Corps throughout North Central Pennsylvania. They built outhouses, pavilions, and the camping areas. The CCC also built the original dam in the swimming area.

== Recreation ==
=== Hunting and fishing ===
Hunting is permitted on 25 acres (10 ha) of Ole Bull State Park. Hunters are expected to follow the rules and regulations of the Pennsylvania State Game Commission. The common game species are ruffed grouse, squirrels, turkey, white-tailed deer, and black bears. Many more acres of forested woodlands are available for hunting on the grounds of the adjacent Susquehannock State Forest.

The water quality of Kettle Creek and Ole Bull Run is very good. The waters offer fishing for brook, rainbow and brown trout. There is a special fishing area of children and people with disabilities near the dam on Kettle Creek. Fishing is prohibited between the wires at the dam basin and in the swimming area.

=== Swimming and camping ===
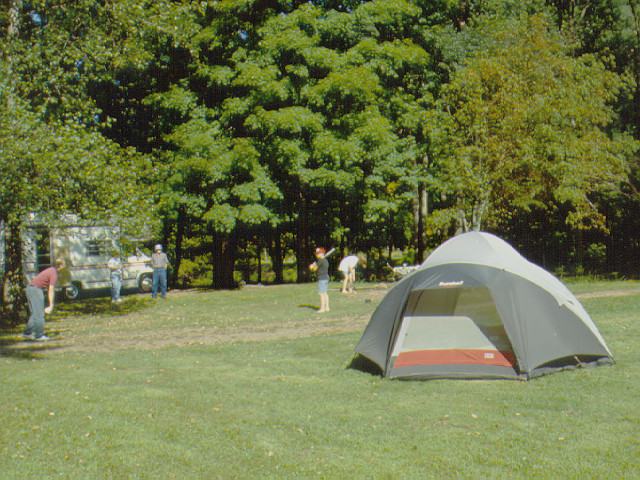
Camping at the park

Swimming is permitted at the 150-foot (46 m) sandy beach on Kettle Creek during the months of May through mid-September. Swim at your own risk. Lifeguards are not provided. Pets are not permitted at the beach.

Camping is permitted year round at Ole Bull State Park. There are two camping areas on the banks of Kettle Creek. Some of the sites are sunny and some are shaded. There are 24 electric hookups at one campsite and 21 at the other. All campsites have a level gravel pad for setting up campers. They also feature a fire ring and a picnic table. Modern restrooms, water hydrants and a sanitary dump station are available at Ole Bull State Park.

=== Picnics and trails ===
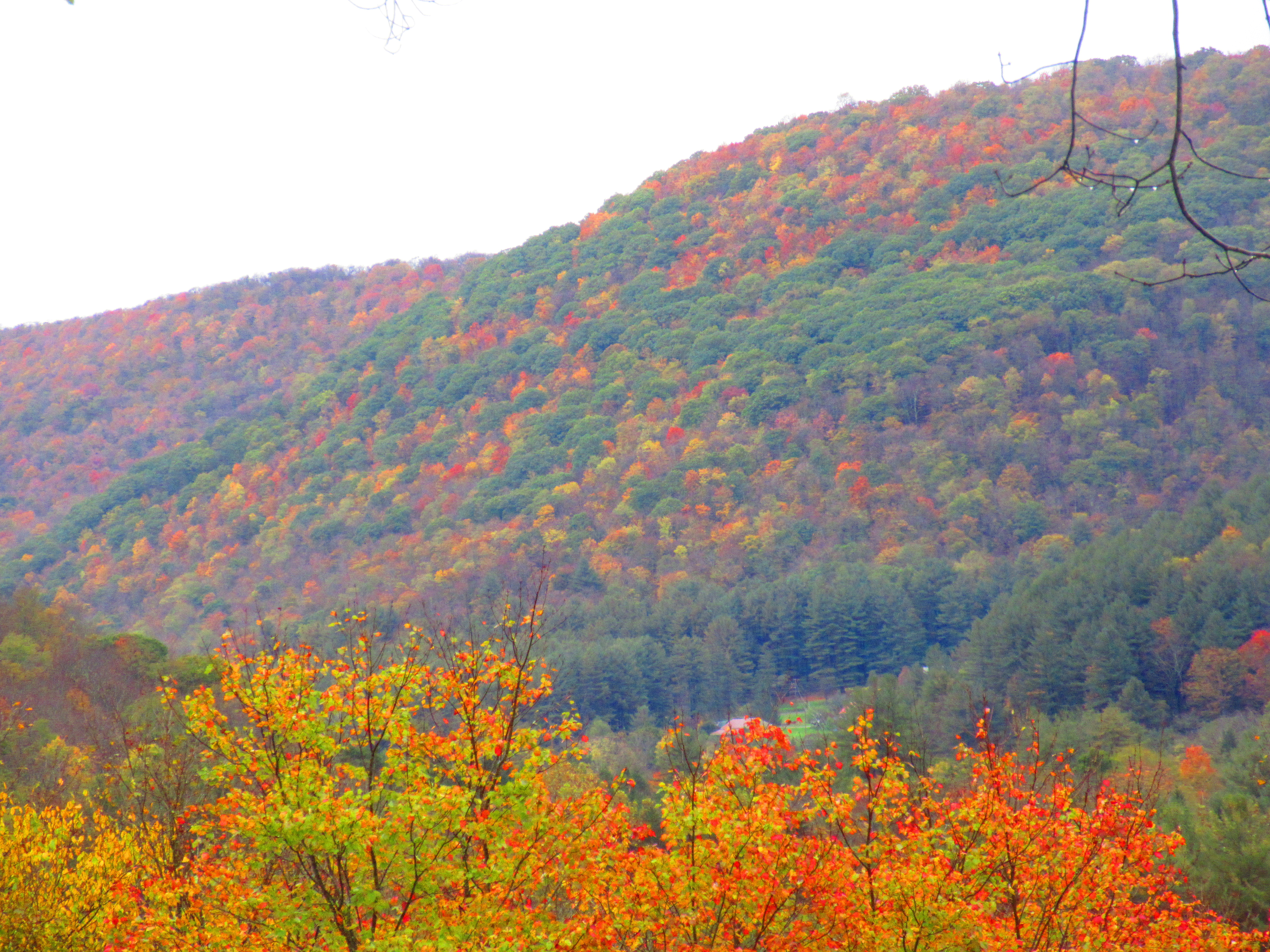
View from the overlook on the Castle Vista Trail

The picnic area is on the bank of Kettle Creek across from the swimming area. There are four pavilions, many picnic tables, a playground, fireplaces, a restroom and water hydrants. There is electricity at the Stone Pavilion. These pavilion must be reserved in order to have access to the electricity.

Ole Bull State Park is a trailhead for the 85 miles (137 km) Susquehannock Trail System. It also 2 miles (3.2 km) of self-contained trails. The Daugherty Loop Trail uses old logging roads and a railroad grade to pass through the Black Forest of Pennsylvania. The Beaver Dam Nature Trail follows Kettle Creek for 0.75-mile (1.21 km). The Ole Bull Trail leads to the remains of Ole Bull's "castle", Nordjenskald. This area is the site of a panoramic view of the park. In the winter months cross country skiing, snow shoes and snow mobiles are permitted.
