= Oleanna (play) =

Play written by David Mamet

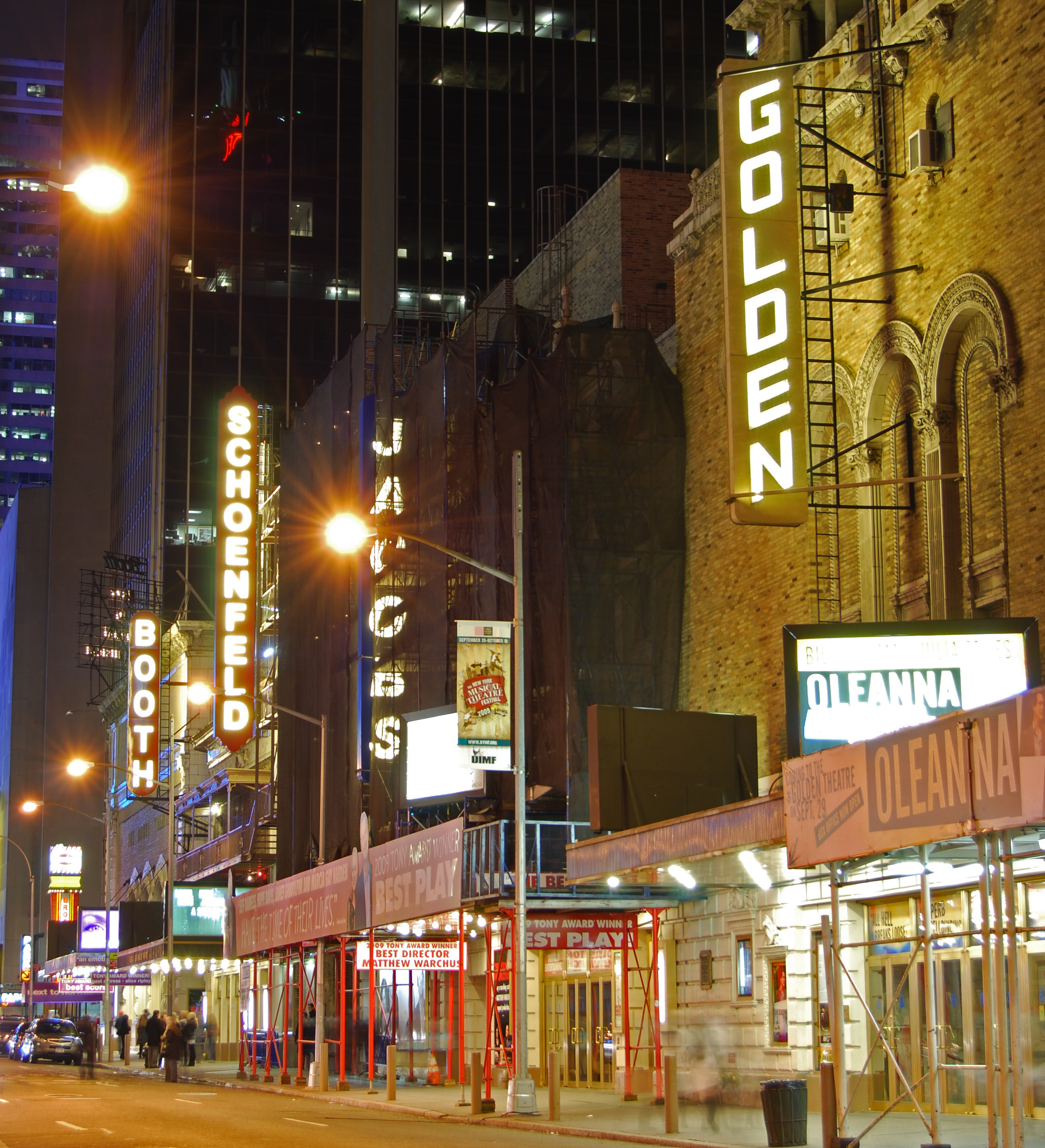
- View of Broadway Theaters on 45th Street at night with Oleanna Marquee visible
- Written by: David Mamet
- Original language: English
- Genre: Drama

Premiere
- Date premiered: May 1992
- Place premiered: American Repertory Theater, Cambridge, Massachusetts, United States

Oleanna is a 1992 two-character play by David Mamet, about the power struggle between a university professor and one of his female students. The play's title, taken from a folk song, refers to a 19th-century escapist vision of utopia. Mamet adapted his play into a 1994 film of the same name.

== Plot summary ==
=== Act I ===
Carol, a college student, is in the office of her professor, John. She expresses frustration that she does not understand the material in his class, despite having read the assigned books and attending his lectures. Of particular concern is a book written by John himself, wherein he questions the modern insistence that everyone participate in higher education, referring to it as "systematic hazing". While talking with Carol, John is often interrupted by the phone ringing. He is about to be granted tenure along with a handsome raise. Anticipating this, John is about to close on a new house, but his wife repeatedly calls with last-minute issues, demanding that he meet her at the home as soon as possible.

After initially appearing insensitive, John eventually decides to help Carol, telling her that he "likes her" and that he also felt similar frustrations as a student. He takes the blame for her not understanding what he is talking about and agrees to give her an "A" if she returns to his office several more times to discuss the material. At one heated point in the discussion, he goes to put his hand on her shoulder to comfort her, but she violently shakes it off. Finally, Carol has warmed to John and is on the verge of divulging a secret when the phone rings again and John's wife tells him that the realtor problems were all a scheme to get him back to the house for a surprise reception in his honor. He departs for home immediately.

=== Act II ===
Carol is back in John's office, but more poised than before. His tenure is threatened because Carol has filed a formal complaint with the committee, accusing him of sexual harassment. She has documented daily occurrences of sexist remarks by John toward his students and describes his offer of giving her an "A" if she agrees to meet with him privately in his office. John hopes to resolve the matter privately with Carol so that the complaint may be withdrawn from the tenure committee, saying he does not understand how his actions could have offended her and attempting to convince her that he was only trying to help her without any ulterior motive. Carol decides it is best that she leave, but John stands in front of the door and grabs hold of her. Carol screams for help.

=== Act III ===
John has been denied tenure and suspended, with a possible dismissal, and is packing up his office. He has not been home to see his wife and family, staying at a hotel for two days trying to work out in his head what has happened. He has asked Carol to speak to him once more and she has obliged. Carol is even more forceful in naming her instructor's flaws, finding it hypocritical that a college professor could question the very system that offers him employment and gives him an academic platform to expound his views. She also refers to "her group", on whose behalf she speaks and from whom she seems to be getting advice and support as she files her complaints.

In passing, John mentions that he has not been home recently. Carol reveals that if he had, he would have learned that her charges against him now amount to attempted rape. Carol offers to drop her charges if John would agree to her group's list of books to be removed from the university, which includes his own. John refuses, angrily telling her to leave his office as his phone rings again. It is his wife, whom he affectionately calls "baby". Carol tells him not to refer to his wife that way. This causes John to finally snap completely and he savagely beats her, screaming obscenities and holding a chair above her head as she cowers on the floor. As John calms down, realizing what he's just done, he says, ". . . well . . ." The play ends with Carol saying, "Yes...that's right."

==== Variations on the ending ====
There have been several endings produced for the end of Act III. In the original Cambridge production in May 1992, after John beats Carol, she stands and a defeated John reads a confessional statement that Carol has prepared. In the Fall 1992 production in New York, the ending is shortened, and after the beating, John ambiguously says "Well...", and Carol responds "Yes. That's right". In the 1993 London production directed by Pinter, the director restored the longer Cambridge ending. The 1994 movie adaptation directed by Mamet uses the briefer ending, but John says "Oh my God" before Carol replies the same "Yes. That's right".

== Cast and characters ==
- John - a pompous, self-absorbed middle-aged professor
- Carol - an insecure twenty-something college student

Notable productions

Characters	Original production	West End debut	Film adaptation	West End revival	Broadway debut
Characters	1992	1993	1994	2004	2009
John	William H. Macy	David Suchet	William H. Macy	Aaron Eckhart	Bill Pullman
Carol	Rebecca Pidgeon	Lia Williams	Debra Eisenstadt	Julia Stiles	Julia Stiles

== Themes ==
The principal themes of the play have centered on the overall comparison to the Anita Hill–Clarence Thomas debate during the Supreme Court hearing of the future Justice, and the amount of veracity which could be associated with the male side of the debate and the amount of veracity to associate with the female side. In the audio commentary for the Criterion DVD edition of another Mamet film, Homicide, Mamet stated that the theme of group affiliation was central to his portrayal of Carol when she announces her joining the activist group on campus.

== Original productions ==
The play premiered in May 1992 in Cambridge, Massachusetts, as the first production of Mamet's new Back Bay Theater Company. The premiere featured William H. Macy as John, a "smug, pompous, insufferable man whose power over academic lives he unconsciously abuses". Rebecca Pidgeon played the female lead, Carol, described by one critic as "Mamet's most fully realized female character...a mousy, confused cipher" whose failure to comprehend concepts and precepts presented in John's class motivated her appeal for personal instruction.

In October, a year after the Anita Hill–Clarence Thomas hearings which "crystallized and concretized" Mamet's dramatization, it appeared off-Broadway at New York City's Orpheum Theatre, with Macy and Pidgeon reprising their roles. The production included a rewritten third scene. Critic Frank Rich provides a summary of the play in his review of the off-Broadway production:

Oleanna ... is an impassioned response to the Thomas hearings. As if ripped right from the typewriter, it could not be more direct in its technique or more incendiary in its ambitions. In Act I, Mr. Mamet locks one man and one woman in an office where, depending on one's point of view, an act of sexual harassment does or does not occur. In Act II, the antagonists, a middle-aged university professor, and an undergraduate student, return to the scene of the alleged crime to try to settle their case without the benefit of counsel, surrogates, or at times, common sense.

The result? During the pause for breath that separates the two scenes of Mr. Mamet's no-holds-barred second act, the audience seemed to be squirming and hyperventilating en masse, so nervous was the laughter and the low rumble of chatter that wafted through the house. The ensuing denouement, which raised the drama's stakes still higher, does nothing to alter the impression that "Oleanna" is likely to provoke more arguments than any play this year.

Oleanna's London premiere was staged at the Royal Court Theatre in 1993, directed by Harold Pinter. David Suchet played John (in a Variety Club Award-winning performance), and Lia Williams played Carol, in a version that used Mamet's original ending from the Cambridge production. As Pinter notes in personal correspondence to Mamet that Pinter also published on his website:

There can be no tougher or more unflinching play than Oleanna. The original ending is, brilliantly, "the last twist of the knife". She gets up from the floor ("Don't worry about me. I'm all right") and goes straight for the throat. The last line seems to me the perfect summation of the play. It's dramatic ice.

Michael Billington's review in The Guardian endorsed Pinter's choice of ending, saying "by restoring Mamet's original ending, in which the professor is forced to confess his failings, Pinter also brings out the pain and tragedy of the situation."

== Film adaptation ==
In 1994, Mamet directed his own film adaptation of Oleanna, starring William H. Macy and Debra Eisenstadt. Roger Ebert, whose review of the film is primarily about the off-Broadway production he saw over a year earlier, characterized the film as awkward and lacking in "fire and passion" compared to the play:

Everything I have written refers to the stage version of the play. Now we come to the film, directed by Mamet himself and essentially unchanged from the theatrical version. To my astonishment, it is not a very good film. I am not sure why. The original characters are there, and the situation, the dialogue, and even one of the actors (Macy) are the same as on the stage. But the material never really takes hold. It seems awkward. It lacks fire and passion. Watching it was like having a pale memory of a vivid experience.

== Revivals ==
A 2004 production at the Garrick Theatre in London featured Aaron Eckhart and Julia Stiles and was directed by Lindsay Posner. Stiles reprised the role of Carol in a 2009 production directed by Doug Hughes and co-starring Bill Pullman at the Mark Taper Forum. On June 30, 2009, it was announced that this production would be transferring to Broadway's John Golden Theatre, with previews beginning September 29 before an October 11 opening night. The show was originally supposed to close on January 3, 2010, but due to poor ticket sales the closing date was moved up to December 6, 2009. The show played 65 performances and 12 previews. The play was put on stage at the Cameri Theater in Tel Aviv in the 2018-2019 season. The Hebrew translation belongs to Ehud Manor, the stage direction to Sarah von Schwartze, and the two roles are played by Dan Shapira and Joy Rieger. BBC Radio broadcast the first radio adaptation starring Mark Bonnar and Cecilia Appiah on Radio 3, 18th February 2024. The director was Gary Brown.

== Cancelled production ==
In 2014, a production of the play at Milwaukee's Alchemist Theatre was stopped after one performance when it received a cease-and-desist order from Mamet's representatives. The production had cast a man to play the character of Carol, making the play about same-sex sexual harassment.

== See also ==
- Oleanna (song)
- Sexual harassment in education
- Brilliant Lies a similar play written earlier by David Williamson
