= Aftenbladet =

Former Norwegian newspaper

Aftenbladet ("The Evening Paper") was a daily newspaper in Oslo, Norway.

== History and profile ==
Aftenbladet was established in 1855 as a continuation of the satirical magazine Krydseren, and had the same editor-in-chief, Ditmar Meidell, for its entire existence except for a short time when J. F. Sandberg edited the newspaper. Contributors include Ole Richter, Bjørnstjerne Bjørnson, Frederik Bætzmann and Jens Braage Halvorsen. Bjørnson was political editor of the newspaper in 1859, published Ja, vi elsker for the first time in 1859 in Aftenbladet, and published En glad Gut as a feuilleton. The newspaper was liberal-leaning, and anti-Morgenbladet.

The newspaper was printed and published by Christian Schibsted until 1860 when it was sold to W. C. Fabritius. It became defunct in 1881.
