= L'Argus =

French magazine

- Editor: Société SNEEP (572214591)
- Categories: Press national
- Frequency: Bimonthly
- Format: 200 x 270 mm
- Founder: Leboncoin
- Country: France
- Language: French
- Website: www.largus.fr
- ISSN: 0751-5545

L'Argus is a French magazine devoted to automobiles, aimed at individuals and professionals. It is particularly renowned for its used vehicle rating, published under the Argus rating brand. Historically weekly, it became bimonthly in January 2015.

The newspaper was founded in 1927 by Paul Rousseau under the title L'argus de l'automobile et des locomotions. Although the passenger car was already its main subject, the weekly then covered news on a variety of rolling, flying and navigating machines. He positions himself in favor of the automobile and firmly advocates for its development. Its audience, made up of users and professionals from the outset, expanded considerably from the 1950s thanks to the widespread use of private cars and the development of motorized vehicles. To meet the new expectations of the general public readership, L'argus reoriented its content from the mid-1980s: from an opinion newspaper, it gradually transformed into a practical useful magazine centered on the problem of purchasing and vehicle sales. In addition, it deployed part of its services on Minitel in 1985 and its entire range of products and services on the Internet in 2000.

Since 2007, the newspaper has further distinguished its two types of readership: the version published for individuals, sold on newsstands, is also available accompanied by supplements dedicated to professionals, by subscription. L'Argus on the Internet is accessible at the addresses largus.fr (for the general public) and pro.largus.fr (for professionals, with or without subscription), as well as on a mobile application.

Since 1993, L'argus has awarded the Utility Vehicle of the Year Trophy and since 2008, the Private Vehicle Trophies.

== History ==
=== From creation to World War II ===
L’argus de l’automobile et des locomotions was founded in 1927 by Paul Rousseau (1868-1941), a personality from the worlds of the press and sport, also passionate about automobiles. At the time, the motorized vehicle was still a luxury or very utilitarian good. But Paul Rousseau decides to promote its growth through a newspaper. The launch was financed by Ernest Loste (1874-1944), a friend who achieved success in the automobile trade by becoming Fiat general agent for France in 1904 and the brand's first French importer.

As its name suggests, the journal was originally interested in all types of locomotion, even if its content focused on the private car. Its title also reveals its ambition to be the rigorous “reporter” of their news: the term “argus” refers to the giant of Greek mythology Argos Panoptes who had a hundred eyes. Intended for users and professionals alike, the weekly intends to remain impartial between its different readerships, as it indicates in the first issue: “Our ambition is to achieve agreement among consumers, manufacturers and tradespeople ". In order to defend their interests, he fought for the adoption of policies favoring the development of the automobile, taking public authorities as the main target. In addition, he believed that “cars are needed at all prices” (1929) and campaigned from the outset to make them a good accessible to all social categories.

From the first issue, the framework for L'argus was laid out, which will remain over the decades, beyond developments. The weekly is mainly interested in economic news and motor sports, but a range of articles covers all other automobile and locomotion information (technical progress, new products, equipment, professions, traffic, road traffic safety, exhibitions and fairs, statistics, etc.) - certain subjects aimed specifically at professionals. Practical sections complete the articles: classified ads, L'Argus addresses, prices of new vehicles (industrial and agricultural vehicles, bicycles, motorboats, passenger planes, two-wheelers, etc.) and "Market" prices. used cars”, ancestors of the famous Argus rating, the brand under which the company now sells its rating service. These average prices (passenger cars, industrial vehicles and two-wheelers) were first provided by the Bureau Veritas organization until 1931, before being developed internally and taking the name "official rating of L'Argus".

The text takes up most of the 8 black and white pages in 360 x 530 mm format. The columns are narrow, the articles concise, accompanied by small illustrations. Printed in a few thousand copies, the title gradually established itself during the 1930s, retaining its content and form, until the Second World War disrupted the life of the newspaper. Indeed, in addition to a reduction in volume, most often to four pages, publication is sometimes interrupted and the content disrupted. Many articles are concerned with the economic (sur)life of the automobile, while the absence of production and imports puts the new market on hold, which also has the effect of inflating market prices. second hand. The scarcity of automobiles, aggravated by requisitions in particular, forced L'Argus to adjust its ratings as best it could. It must also take into account certain developments in demand, such as the valuation of gas-producing vehicles, sought after due to the gasoline shortage, or the impact of government regulations. With the Libération, when it became a question of returning or compensating requisitioned vehicles, a decree entitled “Price of motor vehicles requisitioned by the military authority” stipulated that “the basic prices of the required motor vehicles are determined […] for vehicles tourism, according to the data in the table published on July 6, 1944, under number 847 of L'Argus de l'automobile et des locomotions, under the heading: Used car market, official rating from L'Argus ".

In 1941, Paul Rousseau died. Regarding his succession, the editorial team indicates in the May 22 issue (n°692) that it goes to those whom he “had himself chosen and trained”. Jacques Loste (1905-2001), son of Ernest Loste, took the reins of the newspaper, which he joined in 1930 and of which he has been editor-in-chief since 1938.

=== The Trente Glorieuses Years and the oil crises ===
After the world war, the pre-war content and tone quickly resumed, but until the end of the 1950s we still found articles recalling the consequences of the war on the automobile. In addition, the newspaper did not return to its usual 8 pages until 1947. The reconstruction then made it possible to bring France into a period of great economic growth, the Trente Glorieuses (1945-1973), during which the country discovered the consumption of mass. Thanks to the growth of the industry during the 1950s and 1960s, decades which constitute the “glorious twenty of the automobile”, the private car became democratized. Logically, its popularization benefits the newspaper, whose audience widens and its content develops, the number of pages increasing accordingly - 10 pages in 1948; 48 pages in the early 1980s.

During the period, L'argus barely changed its appearance, except for the notable adoption in 1955 of the famous red for the name L'argus in the title logo. The content is maintained, as is the editorial line. However, the weekly is in tune with the new concerns of the consumer society and is increasingly interested in the vehicle as a common product. From the beginning of the 1960s, he introduced a section of tests where all types of locomotions were “faced with L'Argus tests”. From the end of the 1970s, the presentation of automobile products, mainly new products, gained importance. In addition, the newspaper gave more and more space to classified ads - around 10% of the newspaper's surface area in 1952; 40% in 1972.

Furthermore, in a context marked by the widespread growth of motorization, the articles devoted to the various categories of locomotion are also enriched. Above all, L'Argus extends its second-hand rating section to numerous machines: agricultural tractors (1950), combine harvesters (1955), road tractors (1959), caravans and coaches (1967), airplanes (1968), semi-trailers and trailers (1970); the rating of two-wheelers, stopped at the beginning of the 1930s, returned to the newspaper (1981). At the same time, L'argus is refining the method of using its average prices. From 1963 for example, they can now be adjusted with greater precision depending on the number of kilometers traveled.

Finally, the rise of the automobile having transformed its challenges, L'argus is redoubled in vigor when it comes to defending the interests of its readers. Under the pen of its director-editor-in-chief, the tone hardens. Jacques Loste is mainly concerned with taxation and notably campaigned against the vignette introduced in 1956 and the increase in VAT on automobiles in 1969.

=== New technologies ===
From the 1980s, in a mature automobile market marked by increasingly complex ranges, L'argus adapted to a readership increasingly demanding information and advice. Thus, the sections presenting the models, notably through tests, become essential and dedicated special issues appear. Although the content remains in broad terms, the weekly positions itself as a true purchasing guide, for all categories of transport. A rating is available for almost every type of vehicle, including minicars (1998), collector vehicles (1999), motorhomes (2001) and self-propelled agricultural handling vehicles (2004).

The pen of L'argus changed hands in the mid-1980s, when Florence Loste, Jacques' daughter, took over as editor. She reoriented the editorial line, strongly attenuating the political commitment of the newspaper by resorting to moderate activism, which is expressed in particular within the editorials, as is customary.

The form is also evolving. Until the mid-2000s, the newspaper regularly modernized its appearance. In 1984, 1996 and 2004, it reorganized its content into full-page sections and lightened its presentation by adopting more and more color and illustrations, the newspaper also having changed its format for the first time in 1984 (285 x 410 mm ). From now on, the weekly is more like a magazine than a newspaper.

This period of the 1980s was also marked by the rise of Information and communications technology (NICT) which pushed the press to reinvent itself in order to survive. For L'argus, these tools rather constitute an opportunity for development, by offering a possibility of complementing the weekly. Since 1985, the Minitel's functionalities have made it possible to develop the Argus rating, which improves over time to allow the average price to be adjusted according to the characteristics specific to each vehicle (age to the nearest month, number of kilometers, optional equipment, etc.). On Minitel, L’argus offers distinct services for individuals and professionals. In addition to the price, the most important are the second-hand markets and the estimate of repair costs. Until the beginning of the 2000s, the telematics service recorded a growing number of connections, without overshadowing the paper format: it was during the decade following its opening that the weekly experienced its largest circulations (sometimes more than 200,000 copies). The enthusiasm that Minitel arouses is not denied by the arrival of L'argus on the Web in 1997.

When it opened its website in 2000, which offers content similar to that of Minitel, L'argus was one of the pioneers. It is mainly professionals who use it, as very few homes are equipped with a connection. However, with the rise of the Internet in France from the early 2000s, the L'argus site gradually supplanted the telematics service. The number of connections to Minitel increased, for example, from more than 700,000 per month in 2004 to only 830,000 per year in 2010. After gradually being enriched with new sections, the site tends to become the counterpart of the paper newspaper and therefore also enters into rivalry with the latter. From the start of the 2000s, circulations decreased (around 100,000), while in 2005 the site already attracted more than 300,000 unique visitors each month. Like many press titles, coexistence with the Internet encourages the weekly to reinvent itself.

=== Since 2007 ===
The weekly reacted in 2007 by completely overhauling its format, under the direction of Alexandrine Breton who took over the management of L'argus in 2001, after the close disappearances of her mother Florence Loste and her grandfather Jacques Loste. The weekly has chosen for the first time to offer two versions, one for individuals, the other for professionals (by subscription). In addition, it is completely refocusing on the private car. Moreover, illustrating this major development, the title is shortened for the first time to L’argus de l’automobile. The division of the newspaper is also accompanied by a notable evolution of the form: the model is modernized, the format narrowed (230 x 297 mm) and the number of pages increases significantly. From 84 pages, L'argus increases to more than 120 or even more than 200 pages with the new formula.

For the general public edition, alongside news from the automotive world, the content focuses on the problem of buying/selling a car thanks to the study of models (comparisons, tests, new products), to the sections relating budget and advice for a successful transaction. It is the culmination of the evolution initiated at the end of the Trente Glorieuses and established from the mid-1980s. The key elements of the weekly are logically adapted: the ratings and prices of new two-wheelers, utility vehicles and industrial vehicles are maintained but not the sections. Above all, the weekly stops covering recreational vehicles and agricultural vehicles and ends the publication of their ratings. Finally, classified ads take up much less space. For professionals, the second version offers the same journal, accompanied however by additional content and special special issues, notably the special statistics issue, published every year since 1932.

In 2010, the journal definitively adopted its current name: L'argus, a name that the French Academy had recognized in 1992, during the publication of the first volume of the ninth edition of its dictionary. It also has a slightly reduced format (215 x 278 mm). Apart from these changes, the formula adopted in 2007 is maintained and professionals still have a formula with supplements.

Since the beginning of the 2010s, circulations, of around 70,000 copies per week, have stabilized. Minitel Argus has no longer existed since June 30, 2012, due to the widespread closure of the telematics service by France Telecom. On the other hand, L’argus on the Internet has grown significantly and receives 1.2 million unique visitors per month. Accessible at the addresses largus.fr (for individuals) and pro.largus.fr (for professionals), it is also present on Facebook and Twitter, as well as on a mobile application. The company L'argus continues to deploy its automotive expertise to professionals, notably via the Planet VO, Cardiff VO and PREVAR software, management tools for the VO activity (used vehicles).

In 2015, L'argus and L'argus Édition Pro are getting a makeover: new, more airy model, new format (200 x 270 mm), new frequency (change to bimonthly). The development of L'argus on the internet continues with more than 5 million unique visitors.

In 2019, the French classified ads site Leboncoin announced the acquisition of L'argus.

== See also ==
- History of the automobile
