= Tinius Nagell-Erichsen =

Norwegian publisher

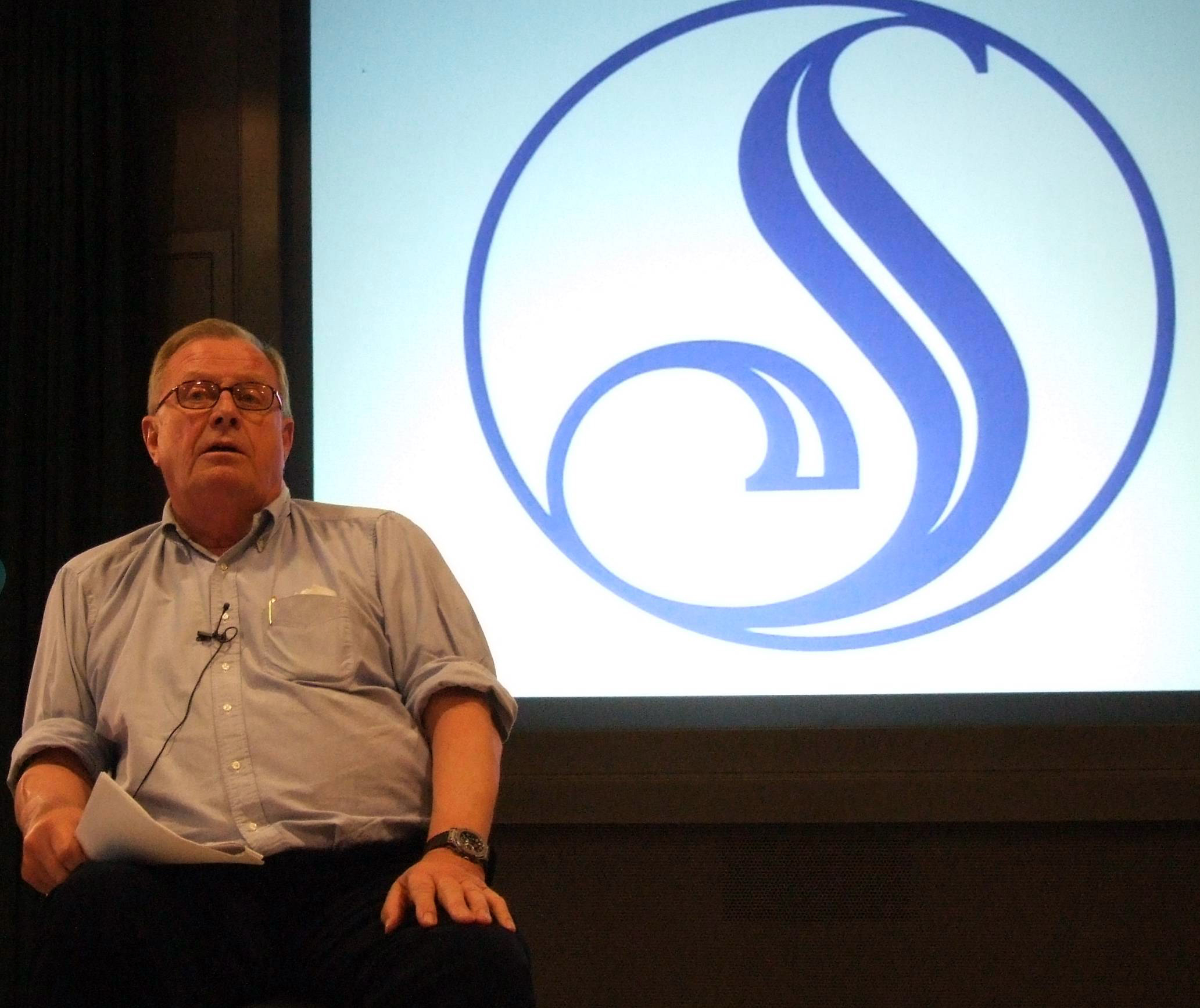
- Tinius Nagell-Erichsen in may 2006
- Born: Einar Fredrik Åke Nagell-Erichsen; 15 February 1934; Oslo, Norway
- Died: 12 November 2007 (aged 73); Nøtterøy, Vestfold, Norway
- Education: London School of Economics
- Occupations: Economist; publisher; CEO
- Title: Chairman of Schibsted (1992–2002); Chief executive officer of Aftenposten (1970–1983)
- Board member of: Schibsted
- Parents: Leif Nagell-Erichsen (1901–1966); Jørgine Margrete Hagerup Angell Lindboe (1907–1968)
- Relatives: Christian Michael Schibsted (Great-grandson)

Einar Fredrik Åke Tinius Nagell-Erichsen (15 February 1934 – 12 November 2007) was a Norwegian publisher, noted for his leadership of the Schibsted media conglomerate which includes the broadsheet newspaper Aftenposten and the tabloid Verdens gang.

Nagell-Erichsen was the great-grandson of Christian Michael Schibsted, the founder of the Schibsted corporation. His father was the Leif Nagell-Erichsen, a noted attorney. The Schibsted corporation was closely held by the Nagell-Erichsen, Riddervold, and Huitfeld families.

== Education ==
Nagell-Erichsen attended the London School of Economics, earning a Master of Science in 1959. He also worked as a waiter for two years in California. He started his career in newspapers as a journalist at a local newspaper Lillehammer Tilskuer to learn the newspaper trade, even learning how to use the typesetting equipment.

== Work life ==
Nagell-Erichsen joined Aftenposten as a junior manager, to the surprise of the owning families of the corporations. In 1968 he became publisher of Verdens Gang, which at the time was at the brink of bankruptcy. He turned the newspaper around, setting it for the course of becoming Norway's largest newspaper. He took over as publisher of Aftenposten in 1970 until 1983, and was the chairman of the board for Schibsted from 1992 to 2002.

== The Tinius Trust ==
Nagell-Erichsen was noted for his gregarious manner and idealism. Among other things, he arranged to place the ownership of Schibsted in an irrevocable trust that would make it impossible for foreign interests to buy the newspaper. The Tinius Trust was founded in 1996.
