= Peugeot Inception =

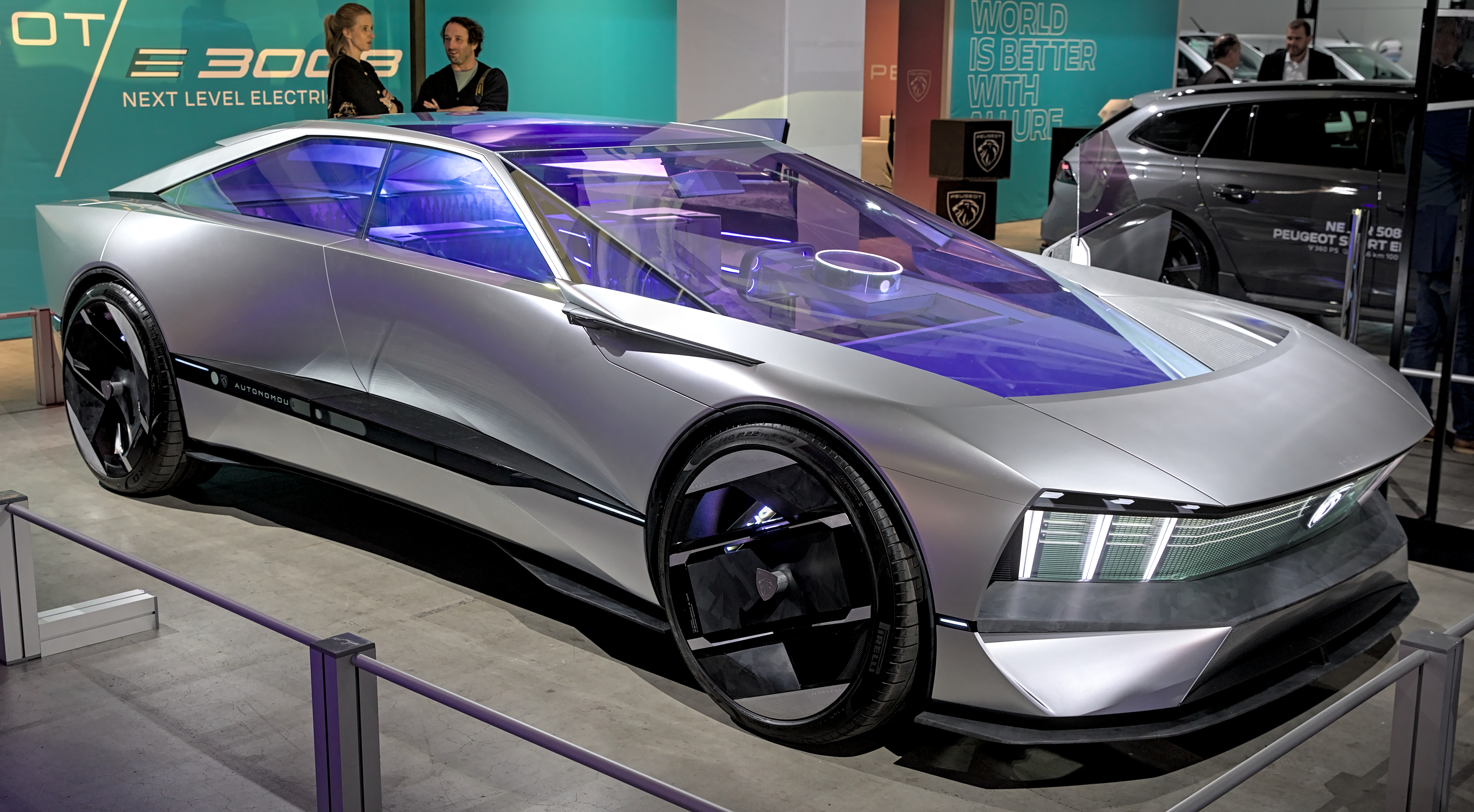

Overview
- Manufacturer: Peugeot
- Production: 2023
- Designer: Maxime Blandin under Matthias Hossann

Body and chassis
- Class: Concept
- Body style: 4-Doors Sedan
- Layout: Dual-motors, Four-wheel drive
- Doors: Conventional (front); Coach (rear)

Powertrain
- Electric motor: Synchronous Electric Motor
- Power output: 680 PS (671 hp; 500 kW)
- Transmission: Direct-drive
- Battery: 100 kWh
- Range: 800 km (497 miles)

Dimensions
- Length: 5,000 mm (197 in)
- Height: 1,340 mm (53 in)

The Peugeot Inception is an electric concept car produced by French car manufacturer Peugeot and presented at the 2023 Consumer Electronics Show.

== Presentation ==
The Inception was unveiled by Carlos Tavares during the presentation of Stellantis at CES 2023.

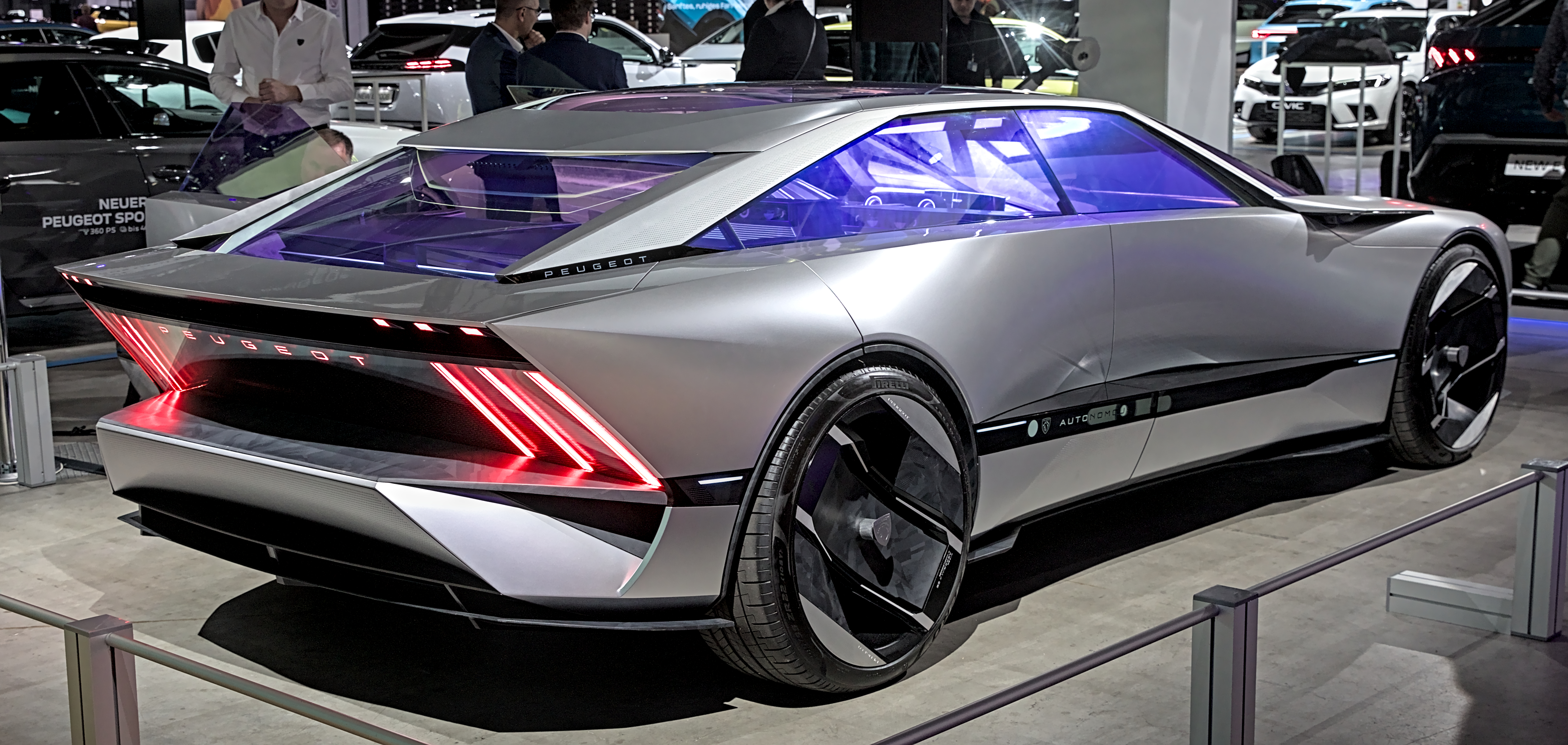
Rear view

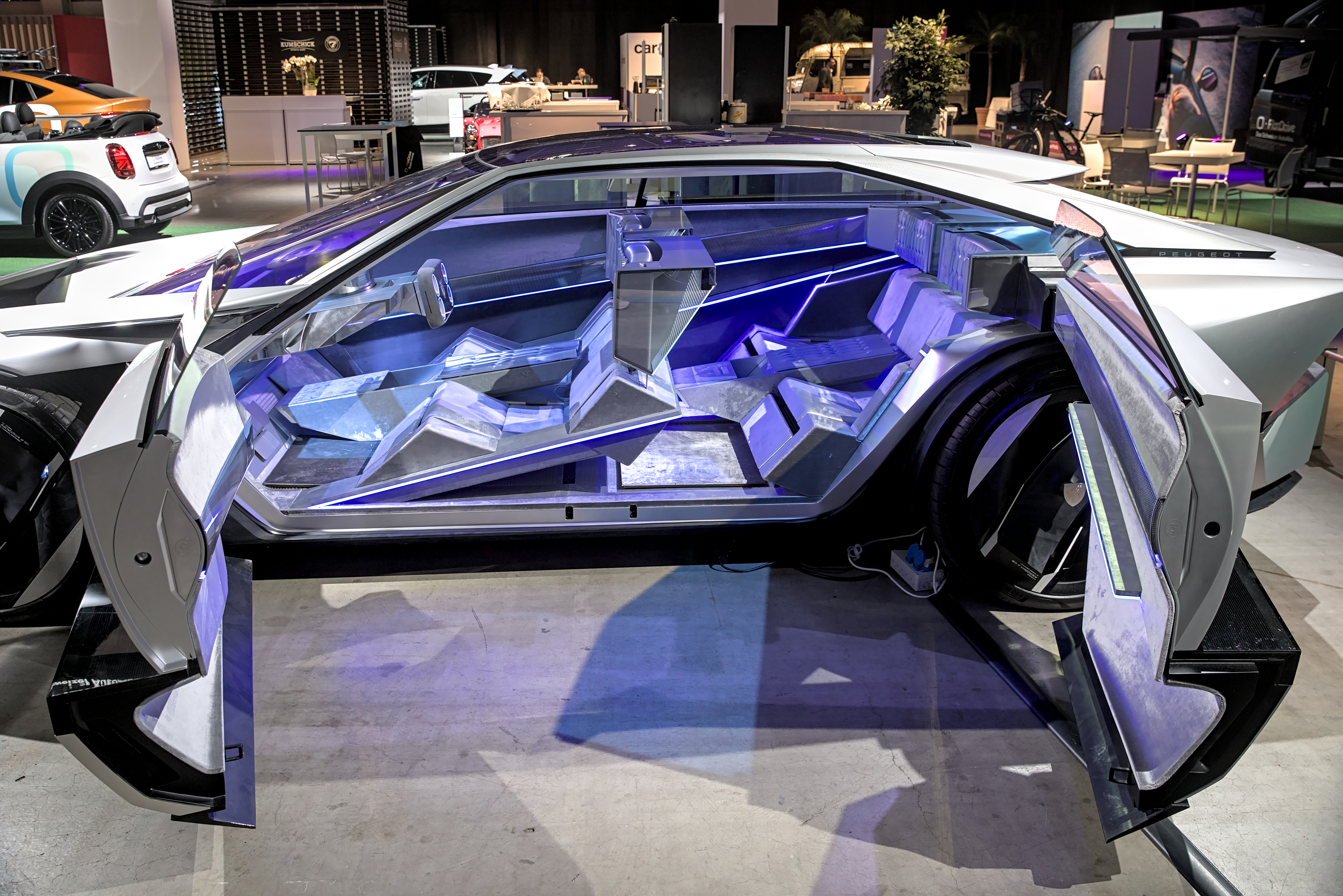
Interior

== Specifications ==
The Inception is based on the future STLA Large platform, dedicated to the group's electric vehicles, with which the next electric Peugeot 3008 will be equipped.

== See also ==
- L'Argus (automobiles French magazine)
