= Oleanna (song) =

Norwegian folk song

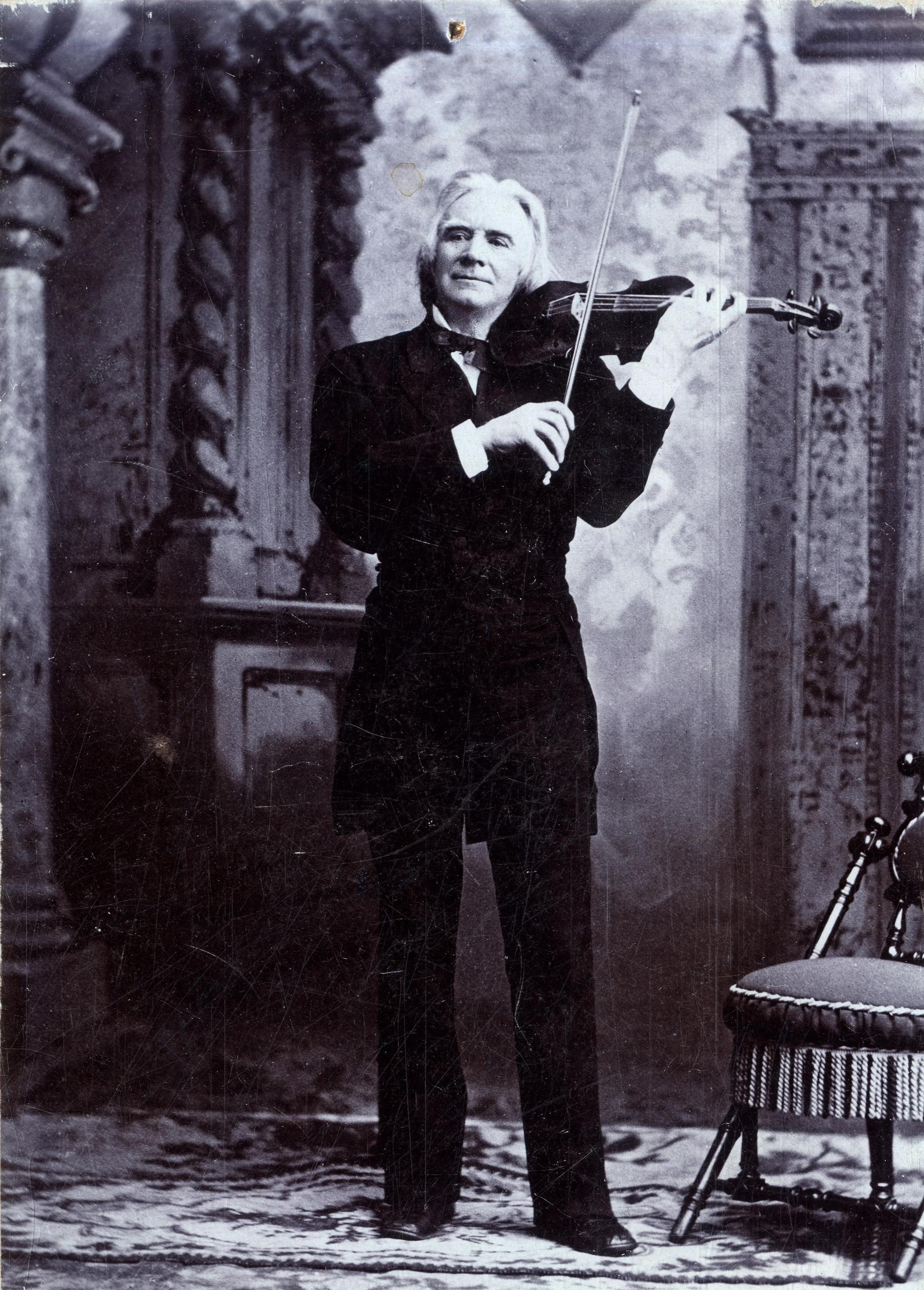
Violinist and composer Ole Bull

"Oleanna" (or "Oleana") is a Norwegian folk song that was translated into English and popularized by former Weavers member Pete Seeger. The song is a critique of Ole Bornemann Bull (Ole Bull) and his vision of a perfect society in the United States.

Oleanna was actually the name of one of Ole Bull's settlements in the Ole Bull /New Norway colony of Pennsylvania. Bull's society failed, and all of the immigrants moved away, as the dense forest made it hard to settle there.

The lyrics concern the singer's desire to leave Norway and escape to Oleanna, a land where "wheat and corn just plant themselves, then grow a good four feet a day while on your bed you rest yourself."

The lyrics for Oleanna were written by Ditmar Meidell, a Norwegian magazine editor, who set his words to the melody "Rio Janeiro". The song was first published on March 5, 1853, in Krydseren (The Cruiser), a satirical magazine which Meidell had founded.

== In English ==
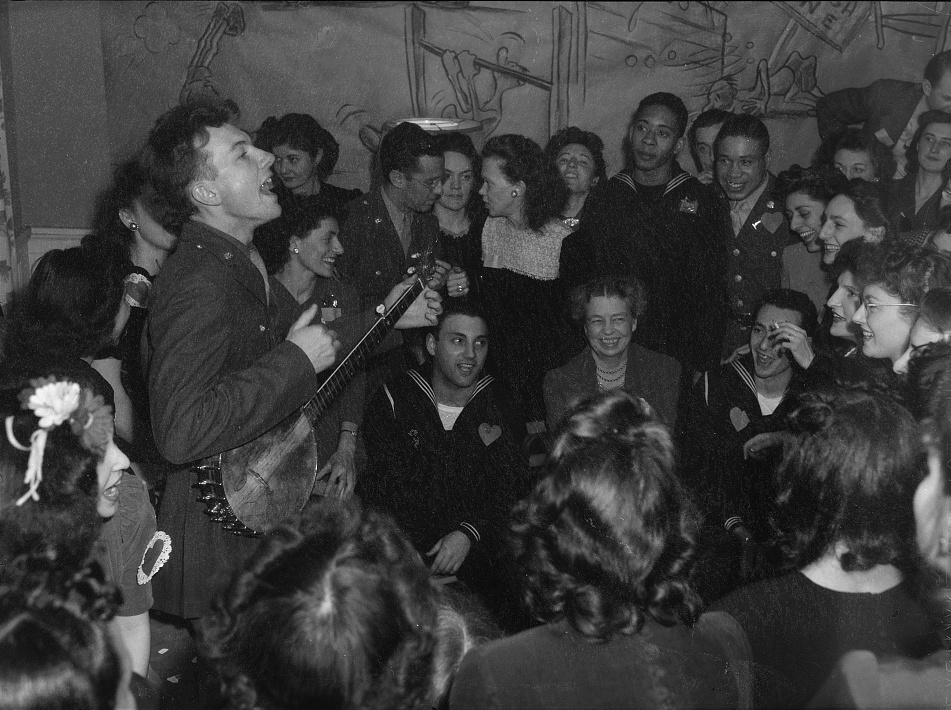
Pete Seeger entertaining Eleanor Roosevelt 1944

Theodore C. Blegen included the song in his 1936 book Norwegian Emigrant Songs and Ballads, which had the original lyrics, a literal translation by Martin B. Ruud and musical notation. Eight years later, Blegen himself wrote a singable translation consisting of 22 verses. Folksinger Pete Seeger learned Oleanna from Blegen's book; in 1955 wrote a six-verse translation that was later published in Sing Out! magazine.

In 1960 Theodore Bikel and Alan Lomax each published versions of Oleanna that drew on Seeger's translation, Ditmar Meidell's original lyrics, and their own imaginations.

Seeger recorded Oleanna twice for Folkways Records. Among those who also covered his translation were Theodore Bikel, Joe Glazer and the Gateway Singers. The Kingston Trio would release a version of the song, however it had lyrics unrelated to Meidell's original text.

Jerry Silverman translated 19 of the 22 verses in 1992.

English and Norwegian recordings of the song "Oleanna" can be found online.
