= Shpock =

Austrian virtual marketplace

- Trade name: Shpock
- Industry: Mobile app
- Founded: 2012; 14 years ago
- Headquarters: Vienna, Austria
- Area served: Worldwide
- Brands: Shpock
- Owner: Finderly GmbH
- Website: http://www.shpock.com/

Logo until 2020

Shpock is an online marketplace that allows users to list products for local sale. Shpock is developed and operated by the Austrian start-up Finderly GmbH and employs 102 people. Finderly GmbH is owned by Russmedia Equity Partners.

== History ==
Shpock is a portmanteau meaning "Shop in your pocket" and was first available for free download for iOS and Android devices in September 2012. The app was downloaded frequently within the first year. Their first financing came from their own funds and grants. Later, they were invested in by business angels.

In 2013, the Norwegian media group Schibsted announced a seven figures investment into Finderly GmbH. In September 2015, Schibsted announced to increase its stake from 82% to 91%.

In 2016, the Shpock app was highly ranked in Germany in the App Store and in Google Play, and in 2017, the Shpock app was one of the ten most loaded free iPhone apps in Austria. As of October 2018, the app has been downloaded more than 50 million times on iOS and Android devices.

In November 2018, Schibsted announced that it had purchased the remaining 9% of finderly GmbH from its founders, making it the sole owner of the company. A massive staff reduction was announced shortly after a change of management, with the goal of turning the previously loss-making company into a profitable business. In August 2020, Shpock rebranded with a redesigned logo.

In June 2021, Russmedia Equity Partners announced the acquisition of Shpock from Adevinta for an undisclosed sum.

== Awards ==
In 2018, Shpock was a laureate at the award ceremony "Germany's best online portals 2018" in the "Market places private providers" category of the German Institute for Service Quality. Also in 2018, Shpock was awarded "Android Excellence App of 2018" in the Google Play Store, and Apple selected Shpock as a "Best of 2017" app in the category "Sustainability". At the Goldbach Youngstar Awards, Shpock was named "Youngest Brand in the 1st Half of 2018". In 2013, Shpock won the Futurezone Award in the category Apps and was awarded the Mingo special prize at the Content Award Vienna. At the “Show Your App Awards" in 2014, Shpock received the Silver app.

== See also ==
- eBay
- Alibaba Group
