= Tinius Trust =

Largest shareholder of Schibsted Media Group

Coordinates: 59°54′54″N 10°44′31″E

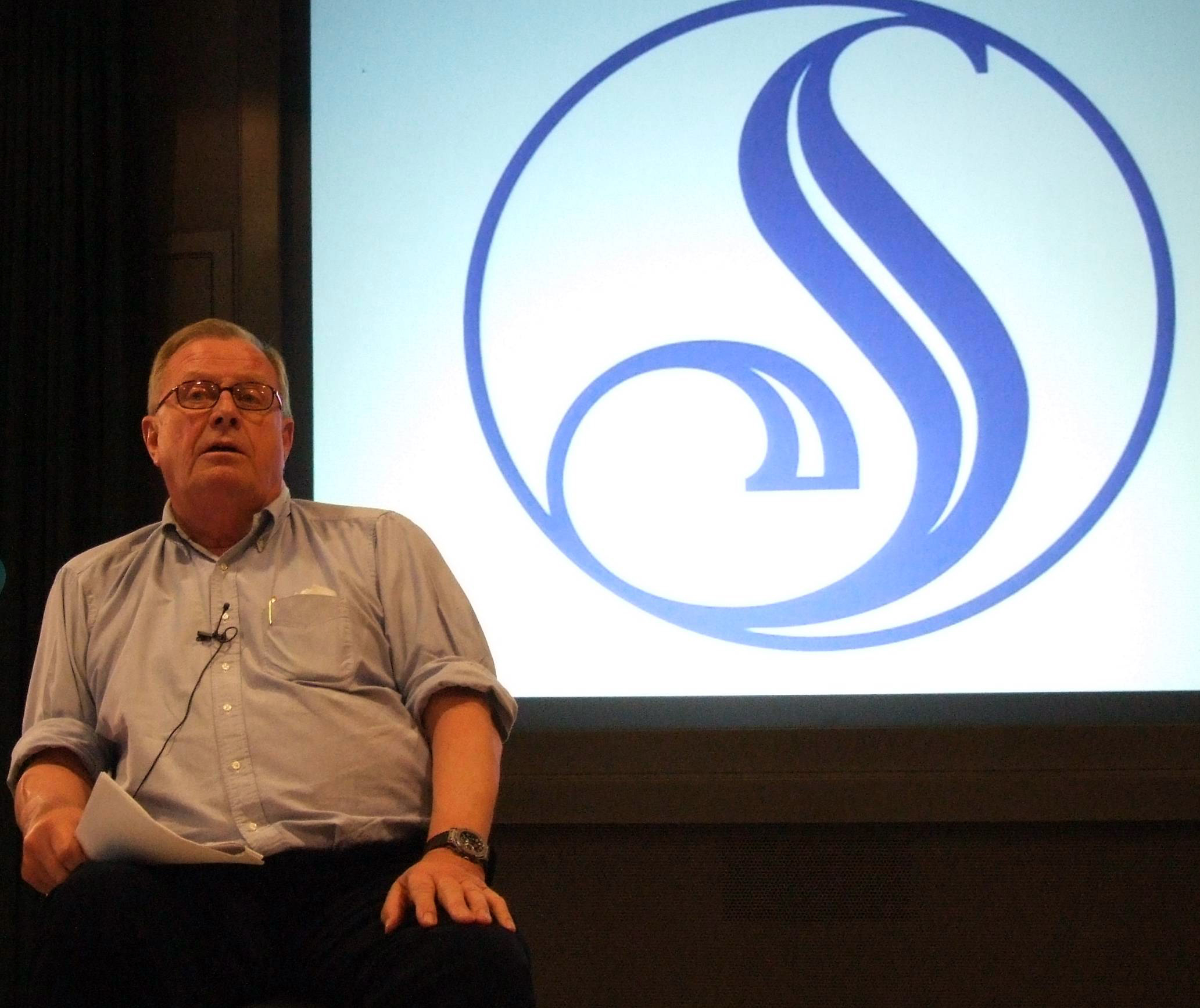
- Founder Tinius Nagell Erichsen in May 2006
- Native name: Stiftelsen Tinius
- Industry: Media
- Founded: May 8, 1996 in Oslo, Norway
- Founder: Tinius Nagell-Erichsen
- Headquarters: Oslo, Norway
- Key people: Tinius Nagell-Erichsen (Founder); Ole Jacob Sunde (Chairman) Kjersti Løken Stavrum (CEO)
- Number of employees: 3 (2017)
- Website: Official site

The Tinius Trust manages the largest block of shares in Schibsted Media Group (26,3%) through the company Blommenholm Industrier. The trust was established by Tinius Nagell-Erichsen. According to its Articles of Association, the Trust must ensure a long-term, healthy financial development of Schibsted, and protect the conditions for editorial independence, credibility and quality in all publications owned by the Group. Kjersti Løken Stavrum is the CEO of the Tinius Trust and Blommenholm Industier. Ole Jacob Sunde is chairman of the board.

== Board of trustees ==
The board of trustees consists of three persons, each with their self-appointed deputy member.

- Ole Jacob Sunde (Chairman)
- John A. Rein
- Kjersti Løken Stavrum

Their deputy members are:

- Karl Christian Agerup, CEO of Oslo Tech
- Jon Wessel-Aas, Lawyer in Bing Hodneland
- Gunilla Asker, SVP Marketing at ICA Sweden AB
