= Ole Bull =

Norwegian violinist (1810–1880)

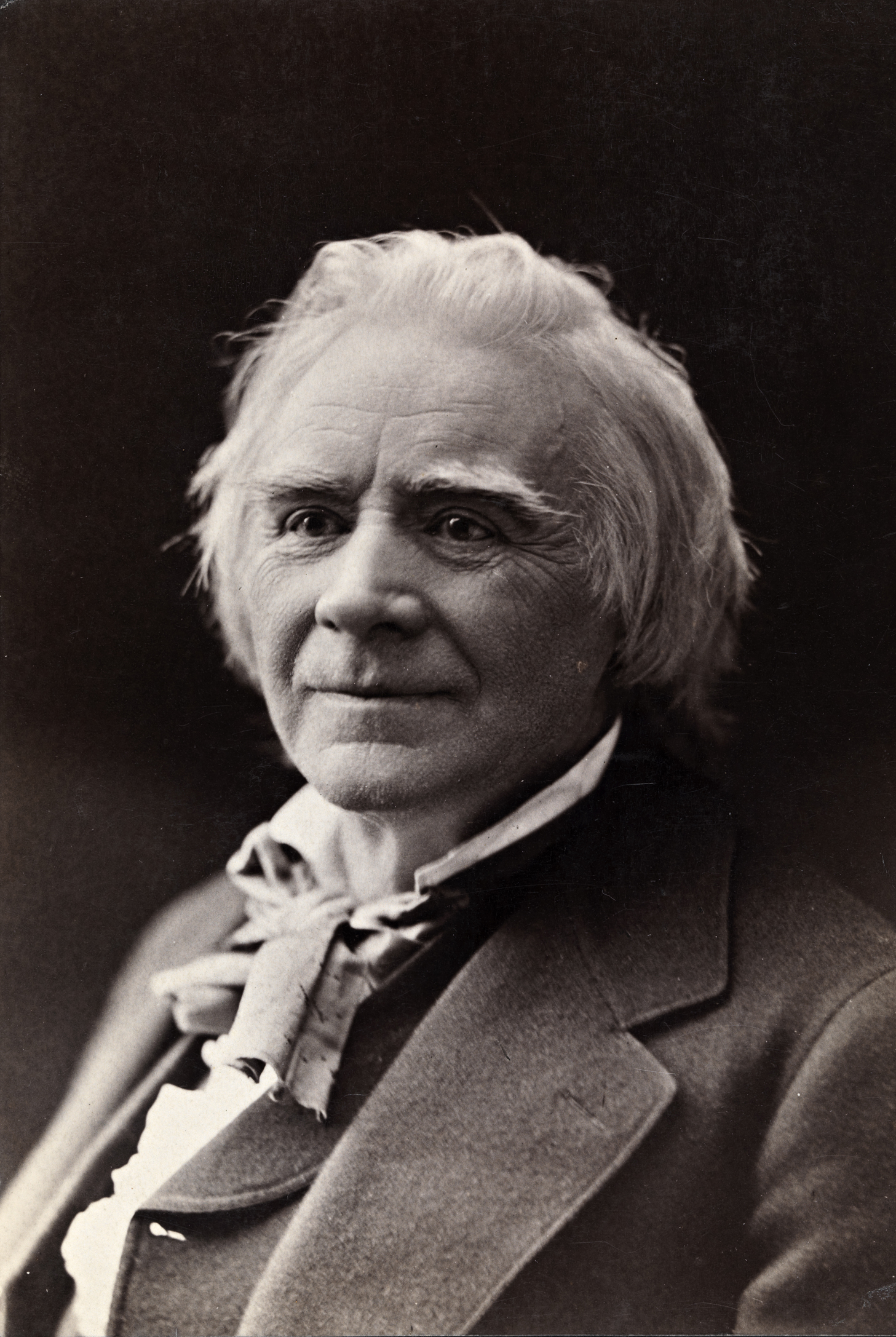
- Born: Ole Bornemann Bull; 5 February 1810; Bergen, Denmark–Norway
- Died: 17 August 1880 (aged 70); Lysøen, Sweden–Norway
- Occupations: Violinist; composer
- Spouse(s): Alexandrine Félicie Villeminot (m. 1836; died 1862) Sara Bull (m. 1870)
- Relatives: Georg Andreas Bull (brother)

Ole Bornemann Bull (Norwegian pronunciation: [ˈù:lə ˈbʉlː]; 5 February 1810 – 17 August 1880) was a Norwegian virtuoso violinist and composer. According to Robert Schumann, he was on a level with Niccolò Paganini for the speed and clarity of his playing.

== Background ==
Bull was born in Bergen, Norway. He was the eldest of ten children of Johan Storm Bull (1787–1838) and Anna Dorothea Borse Geelmuyden (1789–1875). His brother, Georg Andreas Bull became a noted Norwegian architect. He was also the uncle of Edvard Hagerup Bull, Norwegian judge and politician.

His father wished for him to become a minister, but he desired a musical career. At the age of four or five, he could play all of the songs he had heard his mother play on the violin. At age nine, he played first violin in the orchestra of Bergen's theatre and was a soloist with the Bergen Philharmonic Orchestra.

At eighteen, he was sent to the University of Christiania, but failed his examinations. He joined the Musical Lyceum, a musical society, and after its director Waldemar Thrane was taken ill, Bull became the director of Musical Lyceum and the Theater Orchestra in 1828. He also became friends with Henrik Wergeland, who later wrote a biography of Bull.

== Career ==
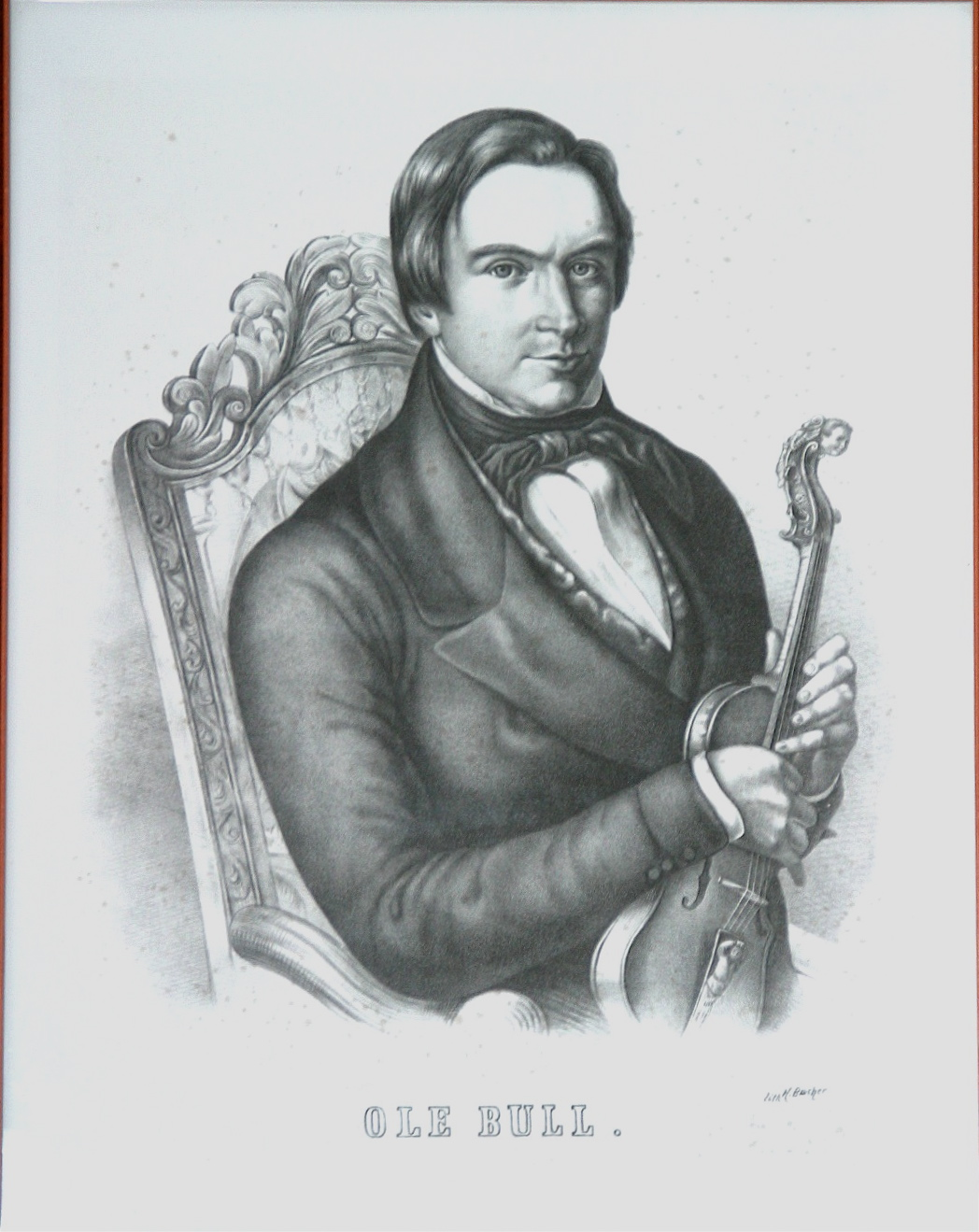
Violinist and composer Ole Bull

After living for a while in Germany, where he pretended to study law, he went to Paris but fared badly for a year or two. In 1832 in Paris he shared rooms with Frederic Chopin as well as the Moravian violin virtuoso Heinrich Wilhelm Ernst. He was eventually successful in becoming a high-level virtuoso, giving thousands of concerts. In England alone these included 274 in 1837, during which visit he also travelled to some of the more remote parts of Britain. Catherine Darwin told her brother about a Shrewsbury concert when "the best performer was Ole Bull on the Violin, who I think very superior to Paganini". Bull became very famous and made a huge fortune. He is believed to have composed more than 70 works, but only about 10 are known today. Best known is Sæterjentens søndag (The dairymaid's Sunday).

Bull was caught up in a rising tide of Norwegian romantic nationalism, and acclaimed the idea of Norway as a sovereign state, separate from Sweden—which became a reality in 1905. In 1850, he co-founded the first theater in which actors spoke Norwegian rather than Danish, namely Det Norske Theater in Bergen—which later became Den Nationale Scene.

In the summer of 1858, Bull met the 15-year-old Edvard Grieg. Bull was a friend of the Grieg family, since Ole Bull's brother was married to the sister of Grieg's mother. Bull noticed Edvard's talent and persuaded his parents to send him to further develop his talents at the Leipzig Conservatory. During the 1860s and 1870s Bull went on several tours across the U.S., often accompanied by soprano Varian Hoffman, baritone Ignatz Pollak, and pianist Edward Hoffman. He was concertmaster at the National Peace Jubilee (June 15–19, 1869) which featured an orchestra of 525 players.

Robert Schumann once wrote that Bull was among "the greatest of all," and that he was on a level with Niccolò Paganini for the speed and clarity of his playing. Bull was also a friend of Franz Liszt and played with him on several occasions.

== Instruments ==
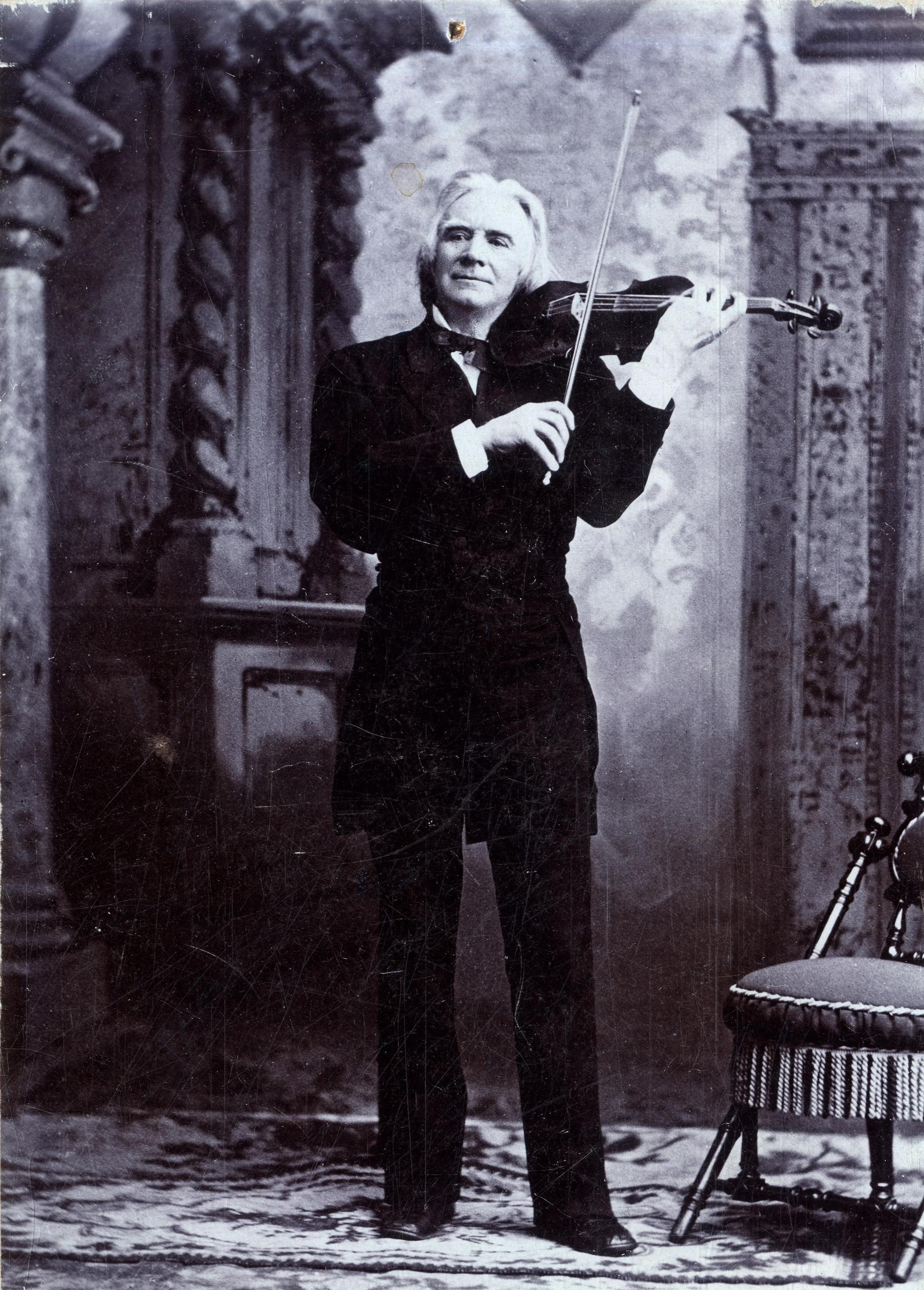
Ole Bull performing

Bull also was a clever luthier, after studies in Paris with Jean-Baptiste Vuillaume. He collected many beautiful violins and violas of Amati, Gasparo da Salò, Guarneri, Stradivari and others. He was the owner of one of the finest violins of the world, made by Gasparo da Salò around 1574 for Ferdinand II, Archduke of Austria. The violin, a gift of his widow to Bull's birthplace, is now in the Bergen Vestlandske Kustindustrimuseum. Bull often performed with Guarneri del Gesù violins during his career.

=== Ole Bull Colony ===
Bull visited the United States several times and was met with great success. In 1852, he obtained a large tract of land in Pennsylvania and founded a colony he called New Norway, but that is commonly referred to as Ole Bull Colony. On 24 May 1852, he formally purchased 11,144 acres (45 km^{2}) for $10,388. The land consisted of four communities: New Bergen, now known as Carter Camp; Oleona, named after him and his mother, six miles (10 km) south of New Bergen; New Norway, one mile south of New Bergen; and Valhalla in the Kettle Creek area.

Bull called the highest point in Valhalla, Nordjenskald, which became the location of his unfinished castle. He soon gave up on this venture, as there was scarcely any land to till, and went back to giving concerts.

Today the site is the location of the Ole Bull State Park, 132-acre (53 ha) state park in Stewardson Township, Potter County, Pennsylvania. Norwegian citizens paid for the construction of a monument on site to honor Ole Bull. The statue was placed in the park on the 150th anniversary of New Norway in 2002.

=== Family life ===
In 1836, Bull married Alexandrine Félicie Villeminot. They had six children, only two of whom survived him. Alexandrine died in 1862. Their children were:

- Ole Storm Felix Bull (1837–39)
- Alexander Ole Felix Etienne Bull (1839–1914)
- Thorvald Bull (1841–62)
- Eleonore Felicie Bull (1843–1923)
- Ernst Bornemann Bull (1844; lived only 5 months)
- Lucie Edvardine Bull (1846–68)

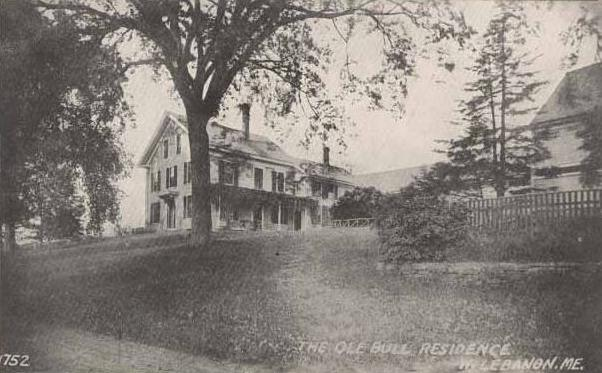
Ironwell, his summer residence at West Lebanon, Maine purchased in 1871

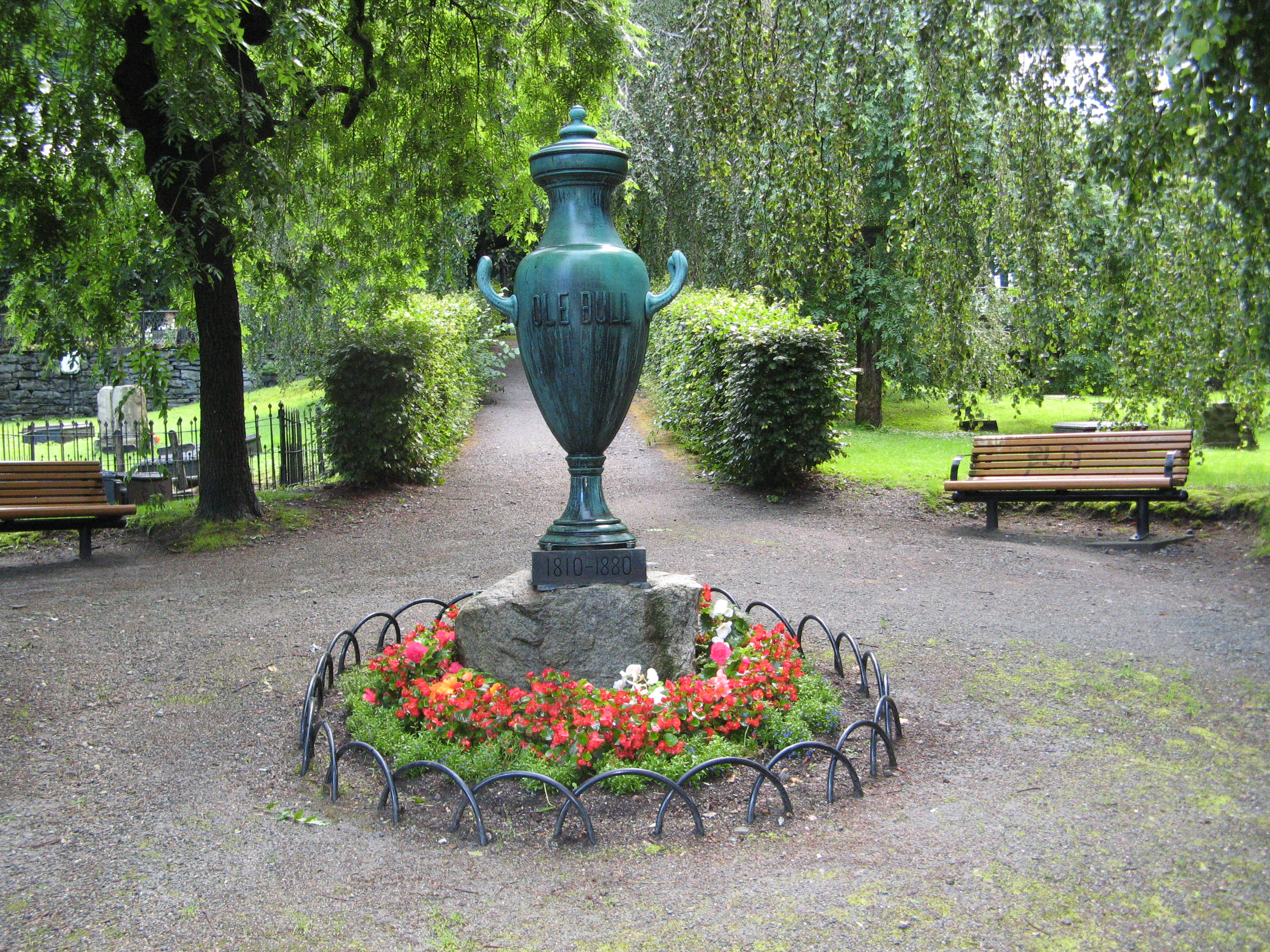
Grave of Ole Bull

In 1868 Bull met Sara Chapman Thorp (1850–1911), the daughter of a prosperous lumber merchant from Eau Claire, Wisconsin. On a return visit in 1870, despite their age difference (he was 60, she was 20), Bull began a courtship, and the couple was secretly married in Norway in June 1870, with a formal wedding in Madison later that year. They had one daughter, Olea (1871–1913). In 1871, he bought a summer home on a rise in West Lebanon, Maine which he named Ironwell. Sara traveled with Bull for the remainder of his career, sometimes accompanying him on the piano. In 1883 she published a memoir of Bull's life.

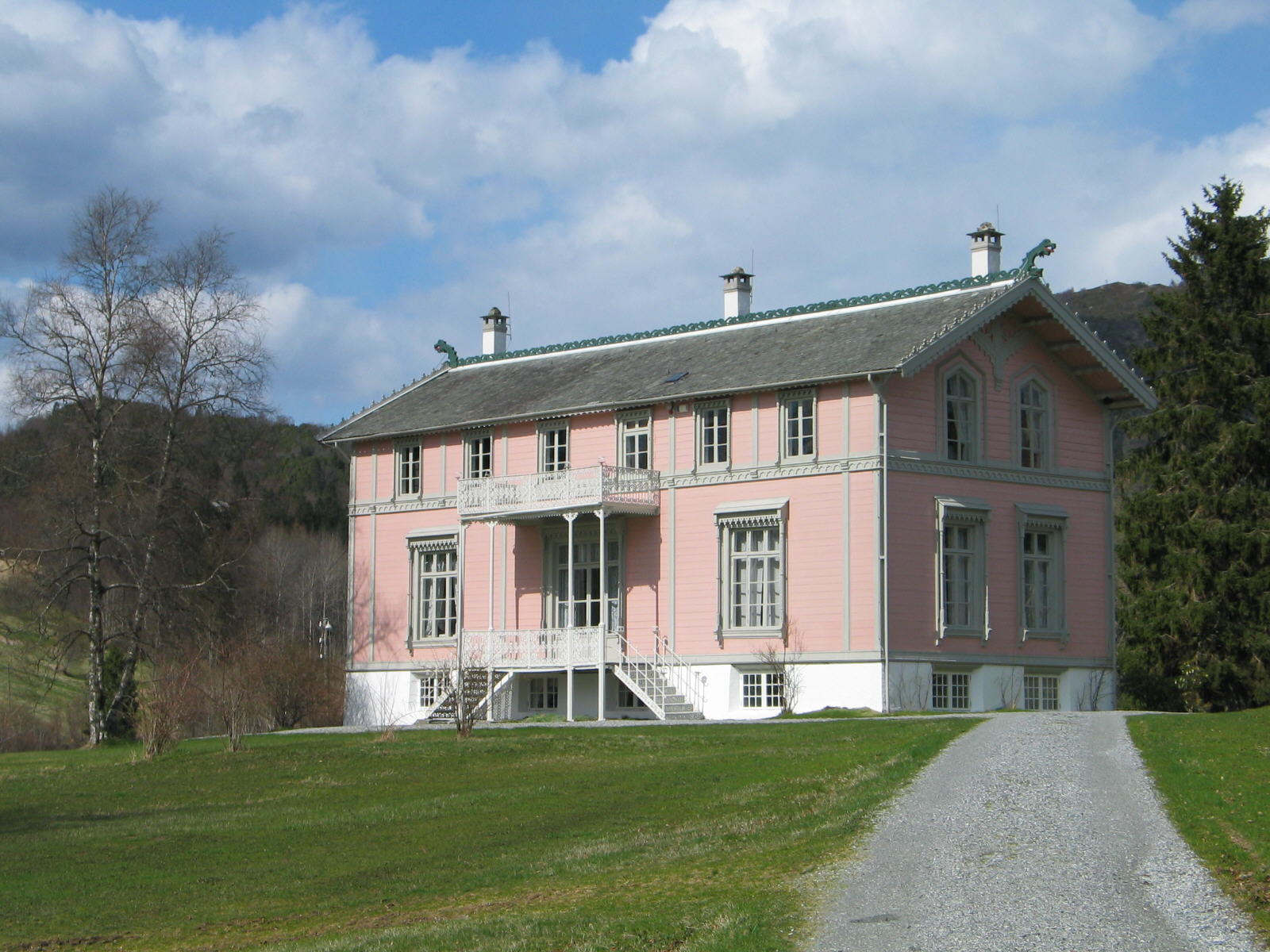
Ole Bull villa at Valestrandsfossen

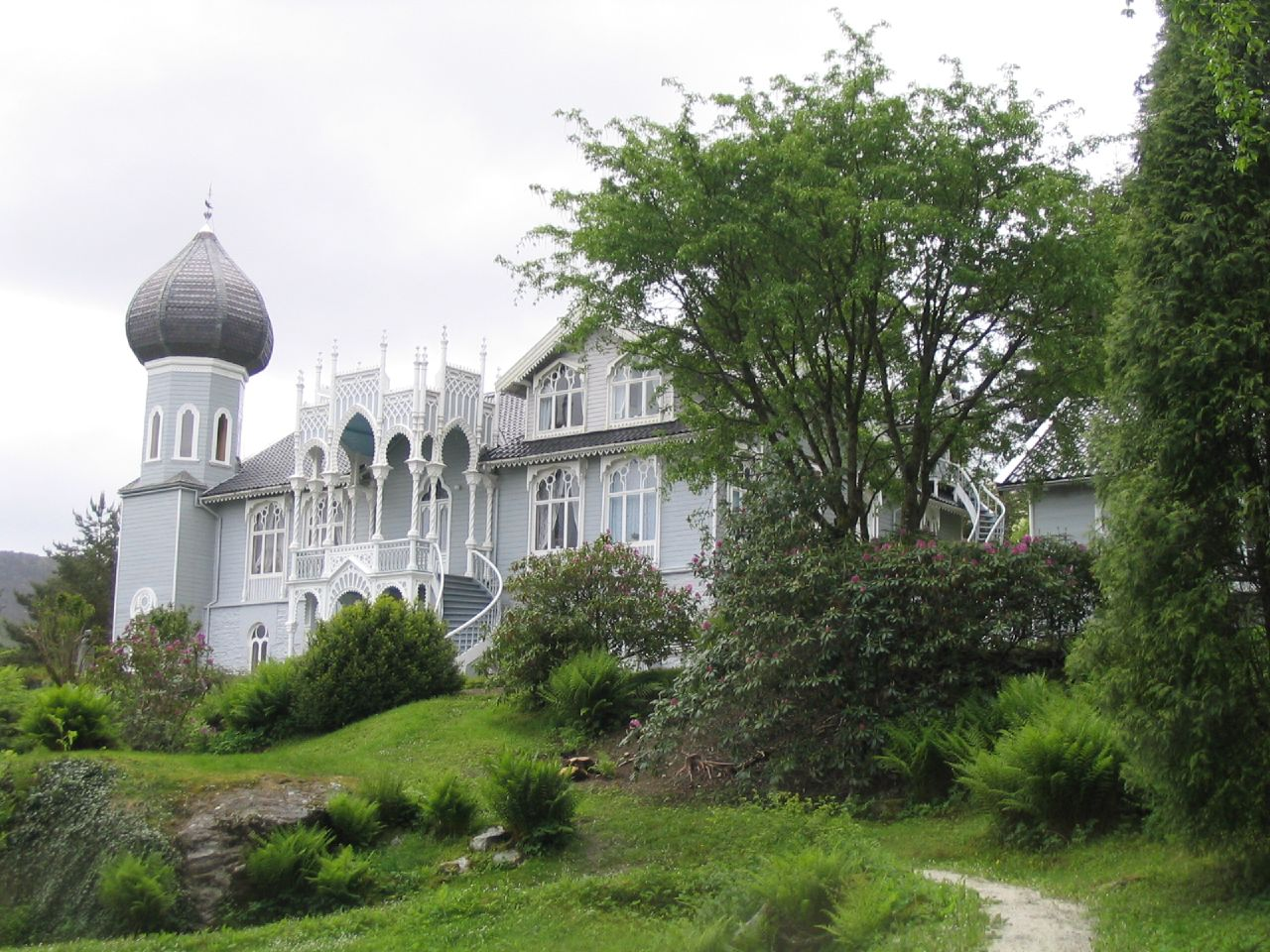
Ole Bull villa at Lysøen

=== Later years ===
Ole Bull bought the island of Lysøen in Os Municipality, south of Bergen, in 1872. He hired architect Conrad Fredrik von der Lippe (1833–1901) to design a residence on the island. Bull died from cancer in his home on Lysøen on 17 August 1880. He had held his last concert in Chicago the same year, despite his illness. A testament to his fame was his funeral procession, perhaps the most spectacular in Norway's history. The ship transporting his body was guided by 15 steamers and a large number of smaller vessels.

== Legacy ==
- Ole Bull's villa on the island of Lysøen was donated to the Association of Norwegian Ancient Monuments Conservation. Museet Lysøen consists of violinist Ole Bull's Villa, an old farm from the 17th century.
- Oleona in Potter County is situated in the mountains of northern Pennsylvania at the intersection of Routes 44 and 144 (Ole Bull Road).
- Ole Bull State Park in the Susquehannock State Forest is on the original site chosen for Bull's colony. The unfinished Ole Bull Castle is maintained by the park and can be visited by hikers. A monument to honor Ole Bull was placed in the park on the 150th anniversary of New Norway in 2002.
- Mammoth Cave in Kentucky has a room called Ole Bull's Concert Hall where he once gave performances.
- Loring Park in Minneapolis, Minnesota is the site of a bronze statue memorializing Ole Bull.
- Ole Bull Cottage, originally purchased to be a school for music by Ole Bull and his wife, is at Green Acre Baháʼí School in Eliot, Maine. Erected in 1896, the Ole Bull Cottage currently serves as the school library building.
- Ole Bull Academy (Ole Bull Akademiet) in Voss, Norway is a music education institution founded in 1977.
- Ole Bull Scene is a stage for cabaret, music and theater at the Ole Bull Plass in Bergen, Norway.
- Ole Bull - Gasparo da Salò violin, a wonderful decorated masterpiece of the famous Italian maker that the virtuoso used for 40 years of world tours. Now is in the Vestlandske Kunstindustrimuseum in Bergen.
- In 2006, director Aslak Aarhus released a motion picture titled Ole Bull—The Titan, the story of Bull's exploits and the impact it had on his French wife and children, who remained neglected in Bergen.
- In 2010 the Norwegian record label 2L released world premiere recordings of Ole Bull's violin concertos and his Spanish fantasy La Verbena de San Juan and a previously unknown version for violin and strings of A Sæterbesøg. The performers on the disc are Annar Follesø, violin, and the Norwegian Radio Orchestra conducted by Ole Kristian Ruud.
- The violin played by Ole Bull in concert in Wilmington, DE c.1847 is in the Sanderson Museum in Chadds Ford, PA. www.sandersonmuseum.org. A sworn affidavit of provenance states: After Bazel Graves of West Chester, PA. purchased it from Bull in 1847, it was inherited by Graves' stepson Jefferson Shaner in 1855. Shaner subsequently sold it to Christian Carmack Sanderson in 1922 for $125. The violin is a copy of a Stainer model and was recently restored to concert condition in 2015 by luthier Teal Wintsch in Wilmington, DE.
- Around the turn of the 20th century, a commercial signature line of Ole Bull violins was manufactured in Germany.
- The Wisconsin Historical Society owns a posthumous, full-length portrait of Ole Bull with violin painted by James Reeve Stuart (1834–1915).
- The subject of Chapter 24 of the Life of Rasmus Anderson is his encounter with Ole Bull.
