= Christian Schibsted =

Norwegian printer

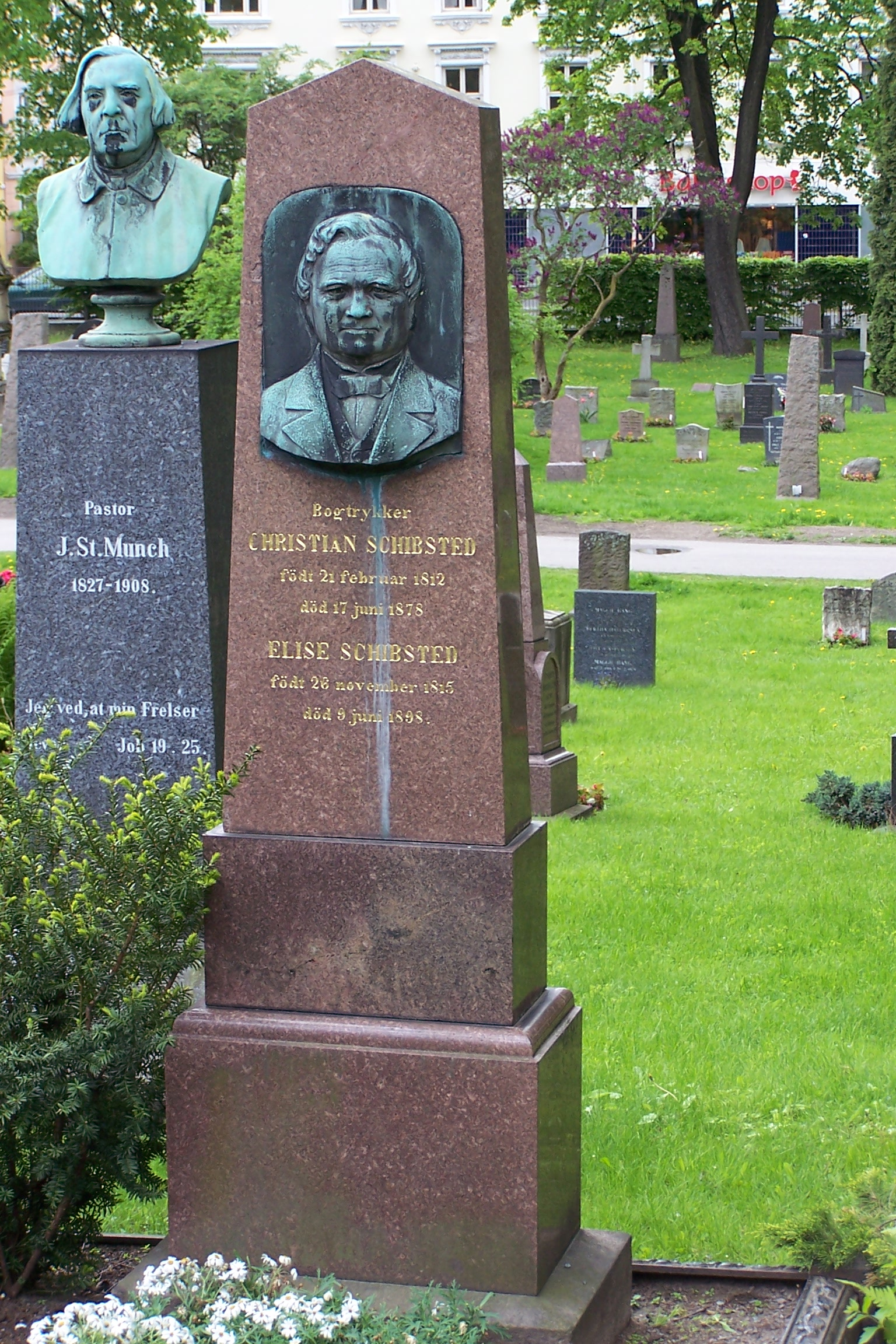
Christian Schibsted's headstone

Christian Michael Schibsted (21 February 1812 – 17 June 1878) was a Norwegian printer and publisher, known for establishing Schibsted Forlag and Aftenposten.

== Early life and career ==
He was born in Christiania as a son of Frederik Schibsted (1766–1822) and his wife Maria Larsen (c.1779–1818). At the age of ten he had lost both his parents, and already the year before he had been sent to an orphanage. He studied book printing between 1829 and 1833, and was hired by the newspaper Morgenbladet in 1836. In 1839 he acquired burghership and established the publishing house Schibsted together with Johan Jørgen Krohn. The publishing house got the name Schibsted in 1843, when Christian Schibsted bought Krohn's share.

In June 1845 Schibsted married Therese Amalie Dahl, but she died already in February 1846. In 1848, then, he married Thomine Halvorsen. They had the son Amandus Schibsted, born 1849, but Thomine Halvorsen died in November 1857. In August 1860 Schibsted married a sister of his second wife, Edel Elise Dorothea Halvorsen, who outlived him by twenty years.

== Later career ==
From the beginning, the publishing house Schibsted had issued various periodicals, magazines and textbooks. From 1849 it published the satirical magazine Krydseren, edited by Ditmar Meidell. From 1855 Krydseren was replaced by a newspaper of the name Aftenbladet. Schibsted sold Aftenbladet in 1860, and instead issued Christiania Adresseblad, which got the name Aftenposten from 1 January 1861. Schibsted never edited the newspaper himself. In 1876 he bought a suitable locality for the newspaper, in "Norway's Fleet Street" Akersgaten, which was in use until 2003.

For the last month of his life, Christian Schibsted was father-in-law of Thrine Schibsted, née Munthe, who married Amandus Schibsted in May 1878. Christian Schibsted died in June 1878, and is buried at Vår Frelsers gravlund in Oslo. After his death, Amandus Schibsted inherited the newspaper, and became the sole owner and chief editor in 1879. He is credited with turning the newspaper into an important political publication. Aftenposten was the largest newspaper in Norway between 1901 and 1981, and is now the second largest. The publishing house Schibsted still owns Aftenposten, but has grown into a multinational corporation.
