= Leboncoin =

French classified advertisements website

- Available in: French
- Founded: 28 April 2006
- Net income: 64,098.400 € (31 December 2019)
- Employees: 368 in 2019
- Website: https://leboncoin.fr
- Commercial: Yes

Leboncoin (French pronunciation: [ləbɔ̃kwɛ̃]) is a classified ads website founded in France in 2006 by the Norwegian conglomerate Schibsted. Its economic model is based on the free service for individuals and the matching of local supply and demand. The operating company is called LBC France.

== Operation ==
Le Bon Coin is a collaborative consumption platform that essentially puts individuals in France in touch with each other when they want to buy or sell. Its economic model is based on the fact that its service is free for individuals, and the geographical location of supply and demand. The site is accessible without prior registration and optional functions are subject to a fee (visibility options made available according to the "freemium" business strategy). Professionals are charged for posting ads and advertisers pay to post their messages on the site's pages. While Leboncoin claims to be a content host, since 2018 the site has been acting as a trusted third party for consumer goods transactions and vacation rentals, becoming an online payment intermediary through a partnership with the Dutch company Adyen, which specializes in electronic payment.

== Popularity ==
According to a survey conducted by Médiamétrie in October 2012, Leboncoin was the second-most popular website in France in terms of time spent by its users, behind Facebook and ahead of Google. At the beginning of 2017, Leboncoin totaled, according to Le Figaro Magazine, a monthly audience of 28 million unique visitors. It is the fourth most visited site in France after Google, Facebook and YouTube.

On 7 February 2021, the site recorded 20.4 million visits during the day. In 2023, the site has between 29 and 30 million unique monthly visitors.

== See also ==
- Gumtree
