= Krydseren =

Norwegian satirical magazine

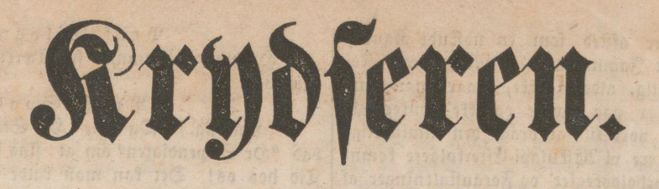

Krydseren was a Norwegian satirical magazine published between 1849–1855 and 1879–1894.

== History and profile ==
Krydseren was established in 1849 by Ditmar Meidell, and published by Christian Schibsted. It is regarded as the first satirical magazine in Norway. The magazine was first published monthly, and then, began to be published weekly.

Krydseren became defunct in 1855, when it was turned into the newspaper Aftenbladet.

The second Krydseren, also referred to as Krydseren II, was published in the years 1879–1894, before the name was changed to Korsaren.
