= Stewardson Township, Pennsylvania =

Township in Pennsylvania, US

Coordinates: 41°32′00″N 77°40′59″W

- Township
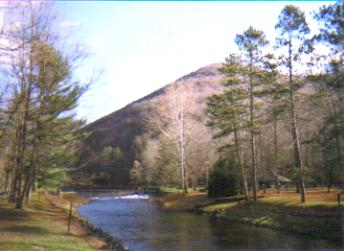
- Kettle Creek passes through Ole Bull State Park in Stewardson Township.

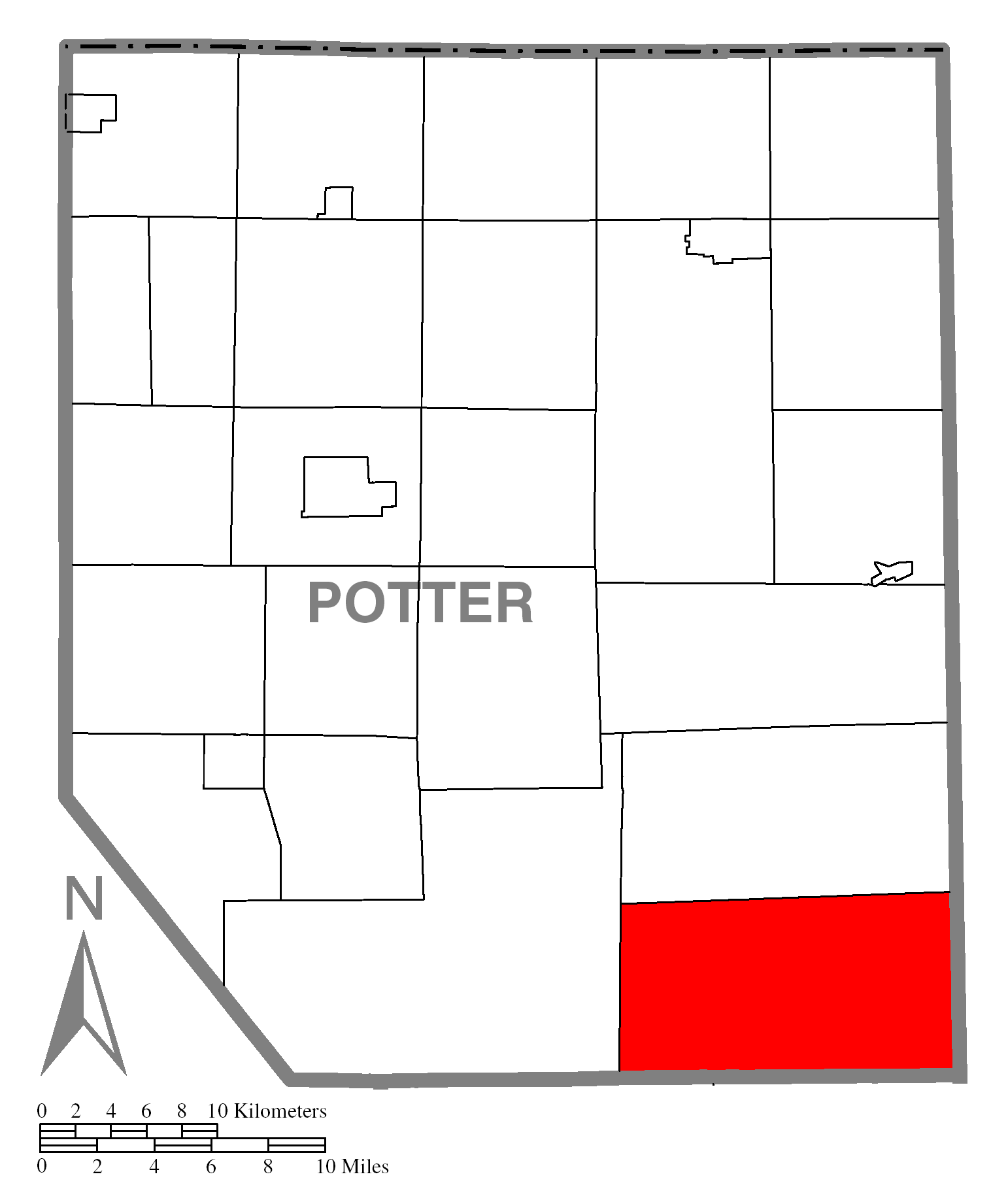
- Map of Potter County, Pennsylvania highlighting Stewardson Township

- Map of Potter County, Pennsylvania
- Country: United States
- State: Pennsylvania
- County: Potter
- Settled: 1852
- Incorporated: 1856

Area
  - Total: 74.07 sq mi (191.83 km^{2})
  - Land: 74.06 sq mi (191.82 km^{2})
  - Water: 0 sq mi (0.00 km^{2})

Population (2020)
  - Total: 64 ▼
  - Estimate (2021): 64
  - Density: 0.96/sq mi (0.37/km^{2})
- Time zone: UTC-5 (EST)
  - Summer (DST): UTC-4 (EDT)
- FIPS code: 42-105-74072

Stewardson Township is a township in Potter County, Pennsylvania, United States. The population was 64 at the 2020 census. Ole Bull State Park, a Pennsylvania state park, is located in Stewardson Township.

== Geography ==
According to the United States Census Bureau, the township has a total area of 74.3 square miles (192.5 km^{2}), all land. Kettle Creek and its tributaries are in the township.

Stewardson Township is located in the southeastern corner of Potter County and is bordered by Abbott Township to the north, Tioga and Lycoming Counties to the east, Clinton County to the south and Wharton Township to the west. Cross Fork is located in the southwest corner of the township. Oleona is located in the northwest of the township, at the intersection of PA Route 44 and PA Route 144.

== Demographics ==
Historical population
| Census | Pop. | Note | %± |
|---|---|---|---|
| 2000 | 74 | | — |
| 2010 | 74 | | 0.0% |
| 2020 | 64 | | −13.5% |
| 2021 (est.) | 64 | | 0.0% |
U.S. Decennial Census

As of the census of 2000, there were 74 people, 39 households, and 20 families residing in the township. The population density was 1.0 people per square mile (0.4/km^{2}). There were 334 housing units at an average density of 4.5/sq mi (1.7/km^{2}). The racial makeup of the township was 98.65% White, and 1.35% from two or more races.

There were 39 households, out of which 15.4% had children under the age of 18 living with them, 43.6% were married couples living together, 5.1% had a female householder with no husband present, and 46.2% were non-families. 35.9% of all households were made up of individuals, and 17.9% had someone living alone who was 65 years of age or older. The average household size was 1.90 and the average family size was 2.43.

In the township the population was spread out, with 13.5% under the age of 18, 4.1% from 18 to 24, 27.0% from 25 to 44, 29.7% from 45 to 64, and 25.7% who were 65 years of age or older. The median age was 47 years. For every 100 females, there were 80.5 males. For every 100 females age 18 and over, there were 93.9 males.

The median income for a household in the township was $21,250, and the median income for a family was $28,125. Males had a median income of $25,625 versus $28,750 for females. The per capita income for the township was $12,235. There were 11.8% of families and 15.8% of the population living below the poverty line, including 28.6% of under eighteens and none of those over 64.
