= G. R. Tinius =

G. R. Tinius was a minister in the Churches of Christ, particularly in Sumner County, Kansas, and the adjoining region of Oklahoma from the late 19th century to the early 20th century.

In the 1940s and 1950s Tinius was a major benefactor of Oklahoma Christian University. A residence hall on that campus bears his name.

In 1956 Tinius compiled, edited, and published a book on the early history of Churches of Christ which adhered to the Restorationist outlook as those congregations began and thrived in the 19th and early 20th centuries in and around Belle Plaine, Kansas. Belle Plaine's infrastructure, Tinius believed, facilitated the influence it had as a focal point for Churches of Christ in that region of Kansas and adjoining Oklahoma.
