= Vend Marketplaces ASA =

International media group

- Trade name: Vend Marketplaces
- Type: Allmennaksjeselskap
- Traded as: OSE: VEND
- Industry: Online marketplaces
- Founded: 1839; 187 years ago
- Headquarters: Oslo, Norway
- Area served: Nordics
- Key people: Christian Printzell Halvorsen (CEO); Karl Christian Agerup (chairman)
- Revenue: NOK 14.6 billion (2021)
- Owners: Tinius Trust; Government Pension Fund of Norway; Foreign banks NWT Media AS; Others
- Number of employees: 1700+
- Subsidiaries: Blocket; FINN; DBA; Tori; Oikotie
- Website: www.vend.com

Vend Marketplaces ASA (formerly Schibsted ASA) is an operator of marketplaces in Northern Europe. The company has its headquarters in Oslo, Norway, and is listed on the Oslo Stock Exchange. The CEO is Christian Printzell Halvorsen.

In 2019, Schibsted spun off their online marketplaces outside northern Europe into a new company called Adevinta. Brands such as Kleinanzeigen, Leboncoin.fr and Shpock were included, and stakes in similar websites across Europe were also transferred. As of December 2022 Schibsted continues to hold a 22.8% stake in the company.

In 2024, Schibsted sold its media operations to The Tinius Trust through Blommenholm Industrier transforming Schibsted into two more focused companies: a media company, known as Schibsted Media, fully owned by the Trust and a publicly listed marketplaces company, originally known as Schibsted Marketplaces (becoming the original company's legal successor) until a new name has been announced. The CEO for Schibsted Media is Siv Juvik Tveitnes.

In 2025, Schibsted Marketplaces announced it would change its name to Vend Marketplaces, taking effect during Q2 2025.

On 25 February 2025, Schibsted Media announced it aimed to buy TV4 Media for 6.55 billion SEK. The acquisition was completed on 1 July 2025.

== History ==
In 1839, Christian Michael Schibsted founded the publishing company Chr. Schibsteds Forlag and in 1860, he started publishing the newspaper Christiania Adresseblad, from 1885 known as Aftenposten. In 1966, Schibsted also acquired Verdens Gang (VG). These were Norway's two largest newspapers, with VG surpassing Aftenposten in 1981. In 1989, under the leadership of Tinius Nagell-Erichsen, Schibsted went from being a family-owned company to a corporation, and was listed on the Oslo Stock Exchange in 1992. From 1992 to 2006, Schibsted owned part of TV 2, and in 2004 Schibsted bought part of TV 4 Sweden. While retaining its newspapers division, the company later shifted its focus from television to Internet classifieds/marketplaces, such as Finn.no, Blocket.se,Tori.fi, and InfoJobs. In 2021 Schibsted acquired dba.dk and Bilbasen.
