= Ditmar Meidell =

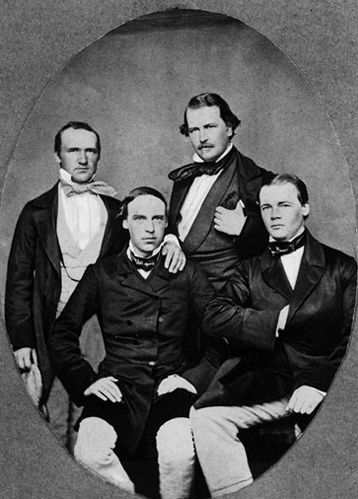
Meidell as number two from the left.

Ditmar Meidell (24 January 1826 – 13 July 1900) was a Norwegian magazine and newspaper editor.

He was born in Bergen as a son of Lieutenant Colonel and customs inspector Christopher Pritzier Meidell (1783–1851) Laura Fogh (1793–1864). He tried to get into the Norwegian Military Academy, but failed the admission test. He studied mineralogy for a short time before founding the satirical magazine Krydseren together with Gudbrand Andreas Berg, Jakob Thomas Rørdam and Claudius Schive in 1849. Hartvig Lassen, Anton Rosing, Halvor Bentsen, Hans Brun and especially Ole Richter were also part of the milieu around the magazine. Norway's first satirical magazine, it was first issued fortnightly, but then weekly and later twice a week. Meidell was the sole editor-in-chief from 1851. Among his contributions as a writer, he is remembered for the song Oleanna. He published collections of writings, Krydserviser in 1882 and then Paa Kryds og paa Tværs in two volumes in 1888 and 1889.

On 1 January 1855, Krydseren ended and in its place came the newspaper Aftenbladet. Meidell edited the newspaper together with Børge Hjelm, then with Ole Richter, then with Bjørnstjerne Bjørnson. Bjørnson did not last for long in Aftenbladet because of political differences, but wrote in 1870 that Meidell was "the finest and wittiest pen" in Norwegian journalism. From 1860 to 1879 Meidell was the sole editor. However, his successor J. Sandberg soon died, and Meidell was again editor from 1880 to 1881, when the newspaper became defunct. From 1884 to 1885 Meidell published a periodical named Norsk Maanedsskrift for Literatur, Kunst og Politik. Despite that Krydseren and Aftenbladet were liberal-leaning, Norsk Maanedsskrift has been called a "Conservative reply to Ernst Sars' Nyt Tidsskrift". Meidell was also head librarian at the Deichman Library from 1884 to 1898.

In July 1868 in Hommedal Meidell married vicar's daughter Thora Houge (1843–1924). He died in July 1900 in Kristiania.
