= Imprisonment of Subramanyam Vedam =

Arrest of Subramanyam Vedam

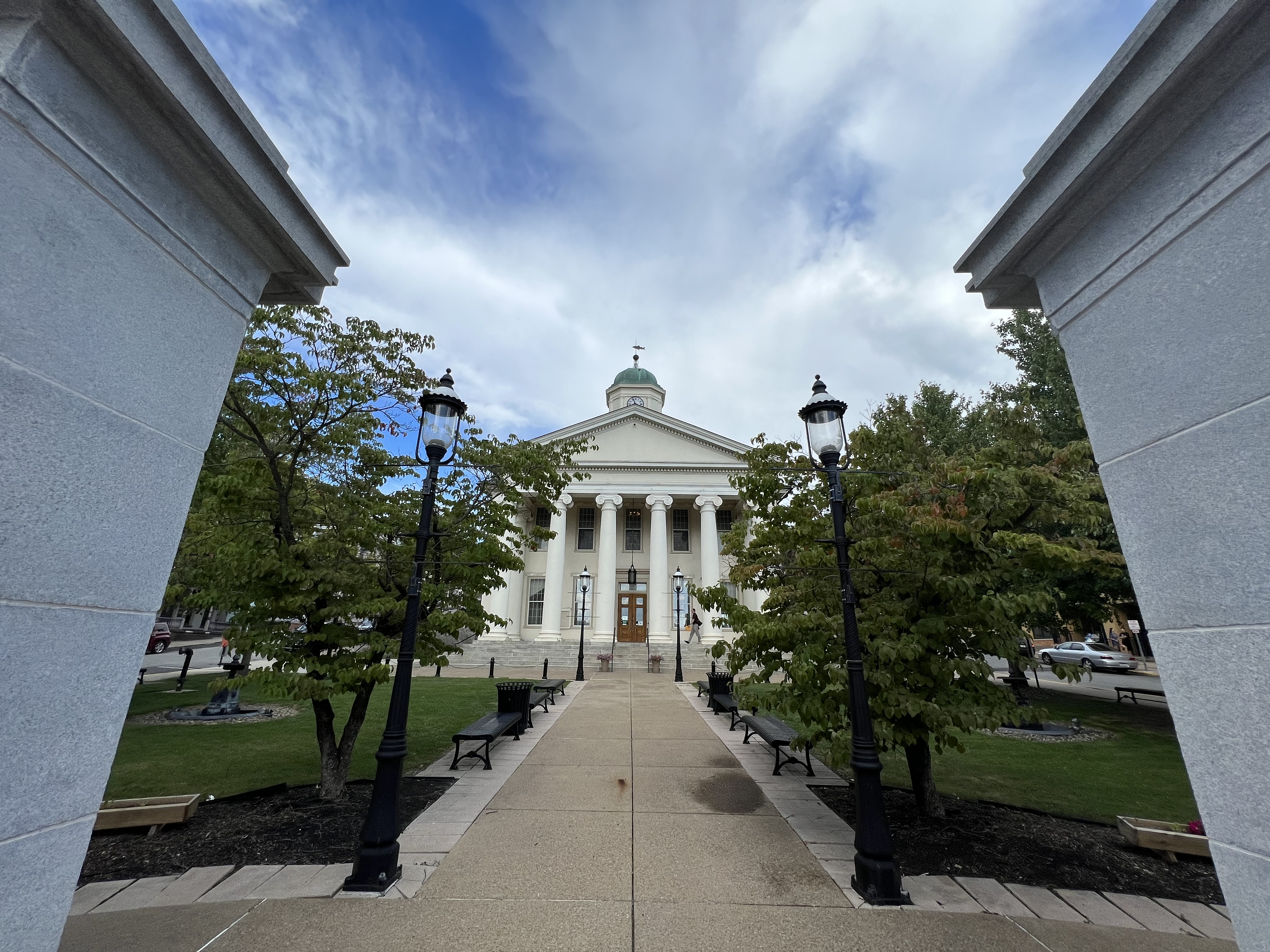
- The Centre County Courthouse, where Vedam was tried and later exonerated
- Date: March 1982; 44 years ago – October 3, 2025; 8 months ago and October 3, 2025; 8 months ago – present
- Duration: 43 years
- Venue: SCI Huntingdon and Moshannon Valley Processing Center
- Location: Decatur Township, Clearfield County, Pennsylvania; 40°55′22″N 78°14′30″W
- Type: Imprisonment following conviction
- Cause: Convictions in first-degree murder of Thomas Kinser
- Outcome: Released on October 3, 2025 after Centre County Court vaccated his sentence; Detained by Immigration Customs Enforcement on the same day
- Arrests: 1
- Charges: First-degree murder and possession with intent to distribute LSD
- Sentence: Life without parole (first instance, 1983)

Subramanyam "Subu" Vedam, an Indian-American man from State College, Pennsylvania, was arrested in 1982 at 19 for the fatal shooting of his friend, 19-year-old Thomas Kinser from Boalsburg, Pennsylvania. He was wrongfully convicted of murder by the Centre County Court of Common Pleas and sentenced to life in prison in 1983. After being incarcerated for 43 years at SCI Huntingdon, Vedam was exonerated of first-degree murder, becoming one of United States' longest serving exonerees. The same day he was released from prison, he was detained by Immigration and Customs Enforcement.

== Background ==
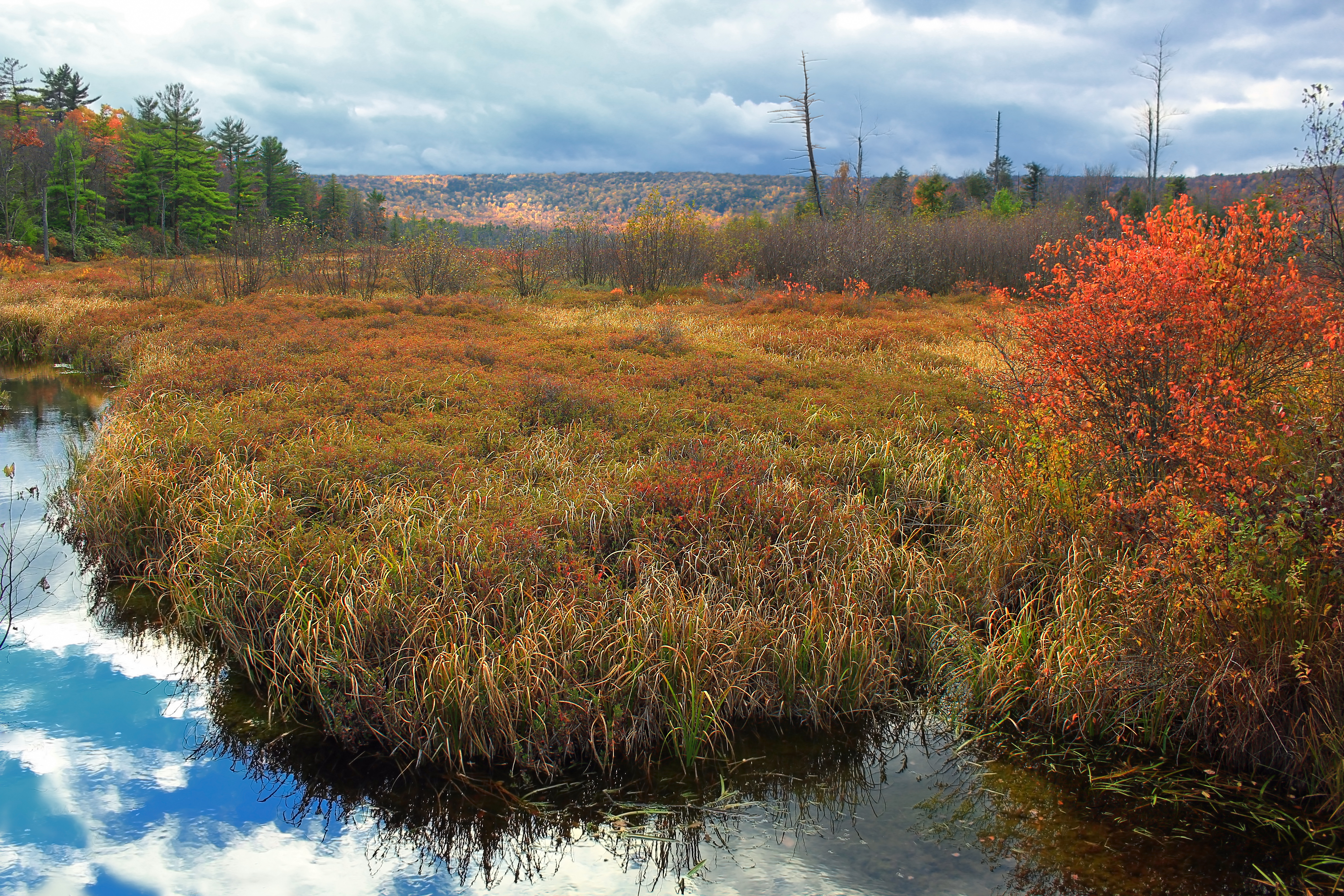
Bear Meadows Natural Area in Harris Township, Pennsylvania where Kinser's body was found

Subramanyam Vedam was born in 1961 in India when his family was visiting to take care of his dying great-grandfather. His parents, a Penn State professor and a librarian, had already immigrated to the United States in 1956, and returned when Vedam was 9 months old.

Vedam grew up in State College, Pennsylvania and attended the Delta Program alongside Thomas Kinser, whom he befriended, and later moved in with, at the Lion's Gate apartment complex.

In September 1981, two teenagers discovered the decomposed body of Thomas Kinser in a sinkhole around the Bear Meadows in the Rothrock State Forest. Kinser had been reported missing on December 18, 1980. Vedam told police that he had last seen Kinser on December 14, when they traveled to Lewistown. Almost five months later, Daniel O’Connell told police that he sold Vedam a firearm, and that Vedam had tested the weapon in State College. Police sent the information to the Federal Bureau of Investigation, and Vedam was charged with first-degree murder on June 28, 1982. O’Connell later testified that police threatened him with burglary charges if he didn't cooperate with the investigation.

Vedam was convicted of first-degree murder by an all-white jury on February 8, 1983; Judge Charles Brown Jr. sentenced him to life in prison without parole.

In 1984, as part of a plea agreement, Vedam was sentenced to two-and-a-half to five years for a drug offense.

== Imprisonment ==
In 2023, a report from the FBI which would surface suggesting that the bullet wound was too small to have been fired from a .25-caliber gun. In August 2025, Judge Jonathan Grine ruled that Vedam's constitutional right of due process was violated. District Attorney Bernie Cantorna went on to dismiss the murder charge.

== ICE detention ==
Immediately after being released from prison, Vedam was taken into custody by Immigration and Customs Enforcement. Despite being a legal permanent resident the Bureau of Immigration and Customs Enforcement is seeking to deport him over his drug dealing conviction. Vedam was held at an ICE short-term holding center in Alexandria, Louisiana, before being transferred to the Moshannon Valley Processing Center near Philipsburg, Pennsylvania.

== See also ==
- State Correctional Institution at Huntingdon
- Moshannon Valley Processing Center
- List of immigration raids and arrests in the second Trump presidency
