= Keystone Trails Association =

- Abbreviation: KTA
- Formation: 1956
- Type: Nonprofit
- Headquarters: Harrisburg, Pennsylvania, U.S.
- Region served: Pennsylvania
- Executive Director: Holly Smith
- President: Wayne Gross
- Staff: 6
- Website: www.kta-hike.org

Keystone Trails Association is a non-profit organization dedicated to preserving hiking trails and addressing related environmental issues in the state of Pennsylvania, United States. It is currently headquartered in Harrisburg, Pennsylvania. Originating as recreational hiking and backpacking club, it has been a licensed 501(c)3 organization since 1981, and adopted a financial structure with a paid executive director and other employees in the early 2000s. It has been named a "Conservation Volunteer Group of the Year" by the government of Pennsylvania.

== History ==
Keystone Trails Association was formed in 1956 and serves as an umbrella organization to coordinate the efforts of dozens of local/regional hiking clubs across Pennsylvania, and it holds several statewide events each year that promote hiking and related types of outdoor recreation throughout the state.

The original impetus to form the organization came from the Appalachian Trail Conference to coordinate the many local hiking clubs in Pennsylvania who maintained various sections of the Appalachian Trail in that state. One of the organization's first major efforts was to organize Pennsylvania hikers and trail maintainers during the scouting and construction of an alternate route for the Appalachian Trail in the late 1960s, when that trail was not yet protected by the American government and was threatened by private development. The original route of the Appalachian Trail was ultimately preserved, and the proposed alternate route is now known as the Tuscarora Trail.

In recent years the organization has negotiated the transfer of a land parcel from the National Park Service, known as Scott Farm along the Appalachian Trail, to serve as offices and as facilities for trail maintainers and long-distance backpackers. The organization also oversees the publication of the official guidebook for the segment of the Appalachian Trail in Pennsylvania, which has been through thirteen editions as of 2023.

== Advocacy ==
Keystone Trails Association coordinates trail care projects across Pennsylvania, often in conjunction with local hiking groups, to repair or expand trails. The organization often seeks grants from governmental and non-profit institutions to repair or expand trails, and also offers small grants and other types of assistance to local hiking clubs for the same purpose. The organization presents awards in an annual ceremony to hikers who have accomplished significant hiking distances on Pennsylvania trails. It also holds regular seminars and workshops on topics like trail care/construction techniques, leave no trace ethics, and outdoor first aid skills.

The organization occasionally participates in land acquisitions to preserve historic hiking trails, including an effort in the 1990s on behalf of the Thousand Steps tourist attraction that is now a segment of the Standing Stone Trail, and which is popular with both hikers and fitness enthusiasts. The organization also makes efforts to preserve hiking trails that are threatened by private land developers or loss of state protections, such as the Horse-Shoe Trail and Mason Dixon Trail, while participating in the acquisition and preservation of previously pristine lands. The group also lobbies for state government protection of rural lands in Pennsylvania for purposes of outdoor recreation and its attendant economic benefits.

In the 2020s, Keystone Trails Association was involved in a lengthy dispute over preserving a longtime ban on hunting on Sundays in Pennsylvania, with that day traditionally being reserved for other outdoor recreation during hunting seasons. The Sunday hunting ban was repealed by the Pennsylvania state legislature in 2025. The organization also regularly opposes the expansion of footpaths into routes for all-terrain vehicles.

Keystone Trails Association is the dedicated maintainer of a segment of the Appalachian Trail in Lehigh County, and it also maintains an overnight shelter in the area. The organization led an effort to restore a trail segment near Palmerton that had been abandoned due to industrial pollution. The organization also advocates for continued protection of national scenic trails by the American government, particularly the Appalachian Trail and North Country Trail which both have segments in Pennsylvania, and the protection of which is often threatened by Congressional politics.
