= Shingletown, Pennsylvania =

Unincorporated community in Pennsylvania, US

- Unincorporated community
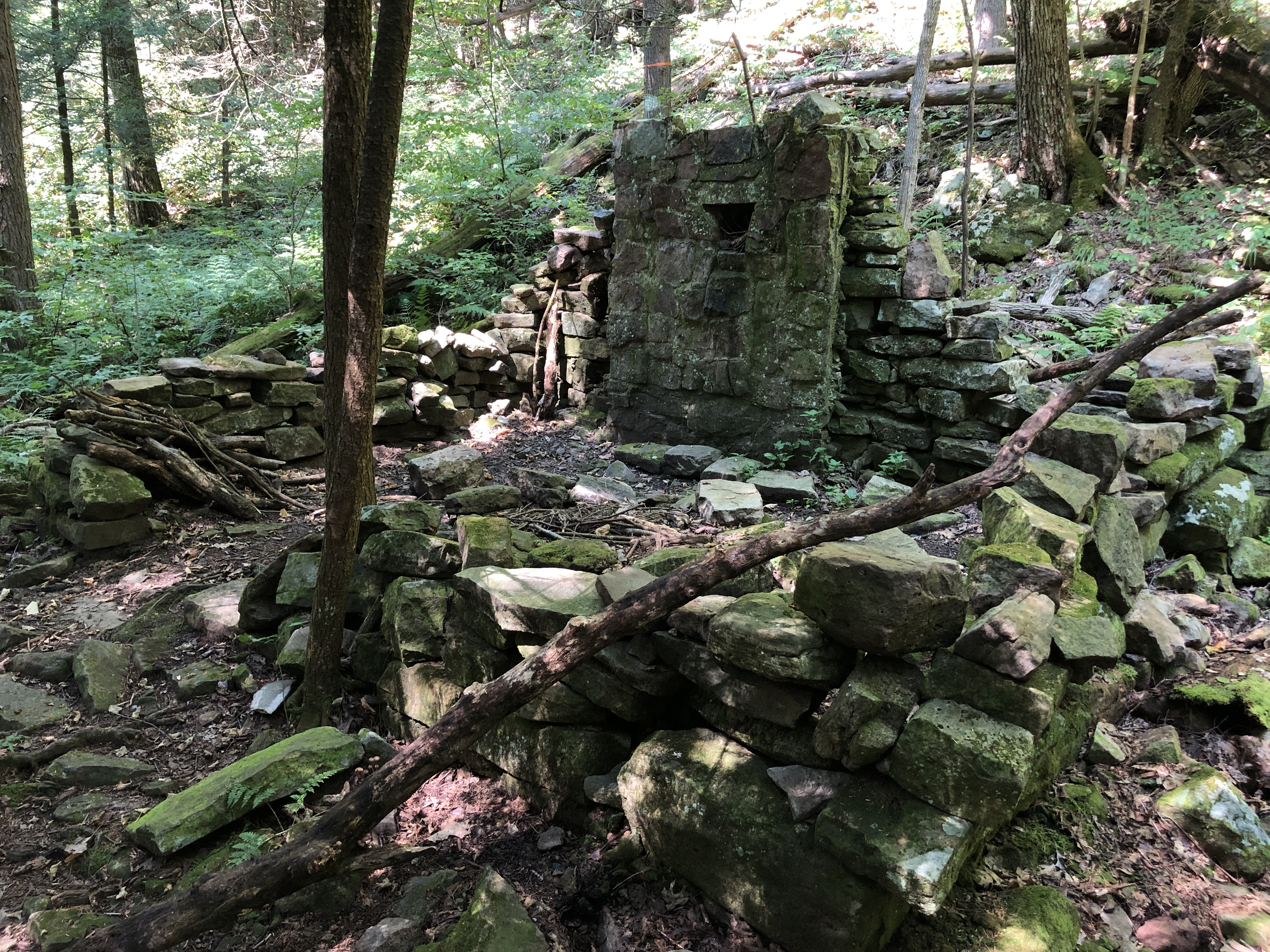
- Abandoned foundation along Roaring Run at Shingletown Gap

- Location within the U.S. state of Pennsylvania Shingletown (the United States)
- Coordinates: 40°45′48.22″N 77°49′32″W
- Country: United States
- State: Pennsylvania
- County: Centre
- Township: Harris
- Elevation: 1,135 ft (346 m)
- Time zone: UTC-5 (Eastern (EST))
  - Summer (DST): UTC-4 (EDT)
- ZIP code: 16801
- GNIS feature ID: 1187544

Shingletown is a neighborhood and an unincorporated community in Harris Township, Centre County, Pennsylvania, United States. It is partially in Happy Valley and the larger Nittany Valley.

== Geography ==
The neighborhood lies along the foothills of Tussey Mountain. Roaring run cuts through the Shingletown gap in the Rothrock State Forest and flows northward through the village where it meets Slab Cabin Run near the intersection of West Branch Road and Woodside Drive. Shingletown is on Pennsylvania Route 45, locally known as Shingletown Road, east of Pine Grove Mills, and west of Boalsburg. The area was historically a source of iron and coal for the local iron industry.
