= 1000 steps =

1000 steps may refer to:

- Kokoda Track Memorial Walk (1000 Steps) in Dandenong Ranges National Park in Melbourne, Australia
- Standing Stone Trail in Pennsylvania, US
