= Big Flat Laurel Natural Area =

Natural area in Pennsylvania

- Location within Pennsylvania
- Location: Huntingdon County and Centre County, Pennsylvania
- Nearest town: Boalsburg
- Coordinates: 40°43′24″N 77°47′05″W
- Area: 184 acres (74 ha)

Big Flat Laurel Natural Area is a 184-acre (74 ha) protected area in Huntingdon County and Centre County, Pennsylvania, United States. It is part of Rothrock State Forest.

== Description ==
The Natural Area was established to protect large stands of mountain laurel, which is the Pennsylvania state flower. It is also known for hosting several bird species and is a popular spot for birdwatchers. The area can be accessed via a segment of the Mid State Trail and provides an overlook of Bear Meadows Natural Area in the valley below.
