= Rocky Ridge Natural Area =

Natural area in Pennsylvania

- Location within Pennsylvania
- Location: Huntingdon County, Pennsylvania
- Nearest town: McAlevys Fort
- Coordinates: 40°33′53″N 77°50′56″W
- Area: 150 acres (61 ha)

Rocky Ridge Natural Area is a 150-acre (61 ha) protected area in Huntingdon County, Pennsylvania, United States. It is part of Rothrock State Forest.

== Description ==
The Natural Area was established to preserve wildflowers while offering access to exposed formations of Oriskany sandstone. The area is popular with rock climbers in the region and is also known for its colorful fall foliage. It is traversed by the Standing Stone Trail.
