= Darlington Trail =

Hiking trail in Pennsylvania, United States

Coordinates: 40.30269°N 77.07478°W

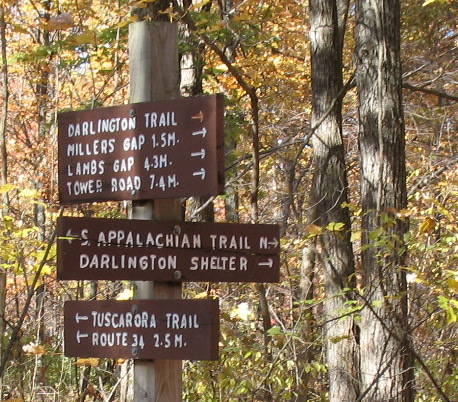
- The western terminus of the Darlington Trail, at a junction with the Tuscarora Trail and Appalachian Trail.
- Length: 7.7 mi (12.4 km)
- Location: Cumberland County and Perry County, Pennsylvania, US
- Established: 1908
- Trailheads: West: Appalachian Trail in Pennsylvania State Game Land 170; East: Tower Road near Marysville, Pennsylvania
- Use: Hiking
- Highest point: 1,300 ft (400 m)
- Lowest point: 600 ft (180 m)
- Difficulty: Moderate
- Season: Year-round
- Hazards: Uneven and rocky terrain, rattlesnakes, mosquitoes, ticks, black bears

The Darlington Trail is a hiking trail of 7.7 miles (12.4 km) in south-central Pennsylvania. Its western end is at a junction with the Tuscarora Trail and the Appalachian Trail. Its eastern end is northwest of Harrisburg at Tower Road, which is only accessible for rugged vehicles.

== History and route ==
The Darlington Trail predates the Appalachian Trail, and was founded in 1908 by the former Pennsylvania Alpine Club. It was named for the secretary of the club, Bishop James Henry Darlington of St. Stephen's Cathedral in Harrisburg. The trail was originally much longer, reaching from near Chambersburg in the southwest to a vista over the Susquehanna River at its northeastern end. The trail was adopted by the Susquehanna Appalachian Trail Club in 1954, after it had mostly deteriorated. A portion of the original route was later incorporated into the Appalachian Trail. Near the trail's present western end, Darlington Shelter is commonly used by hikers on the Tuscarora and Appalachian Trails. The Darlington Trail also features two evenly-spaced camping shelters of its own at Millers Gap and Lambs Gap.
