= Penn-Roosevelt State Park =

Park in Centre County, Pennsylvania

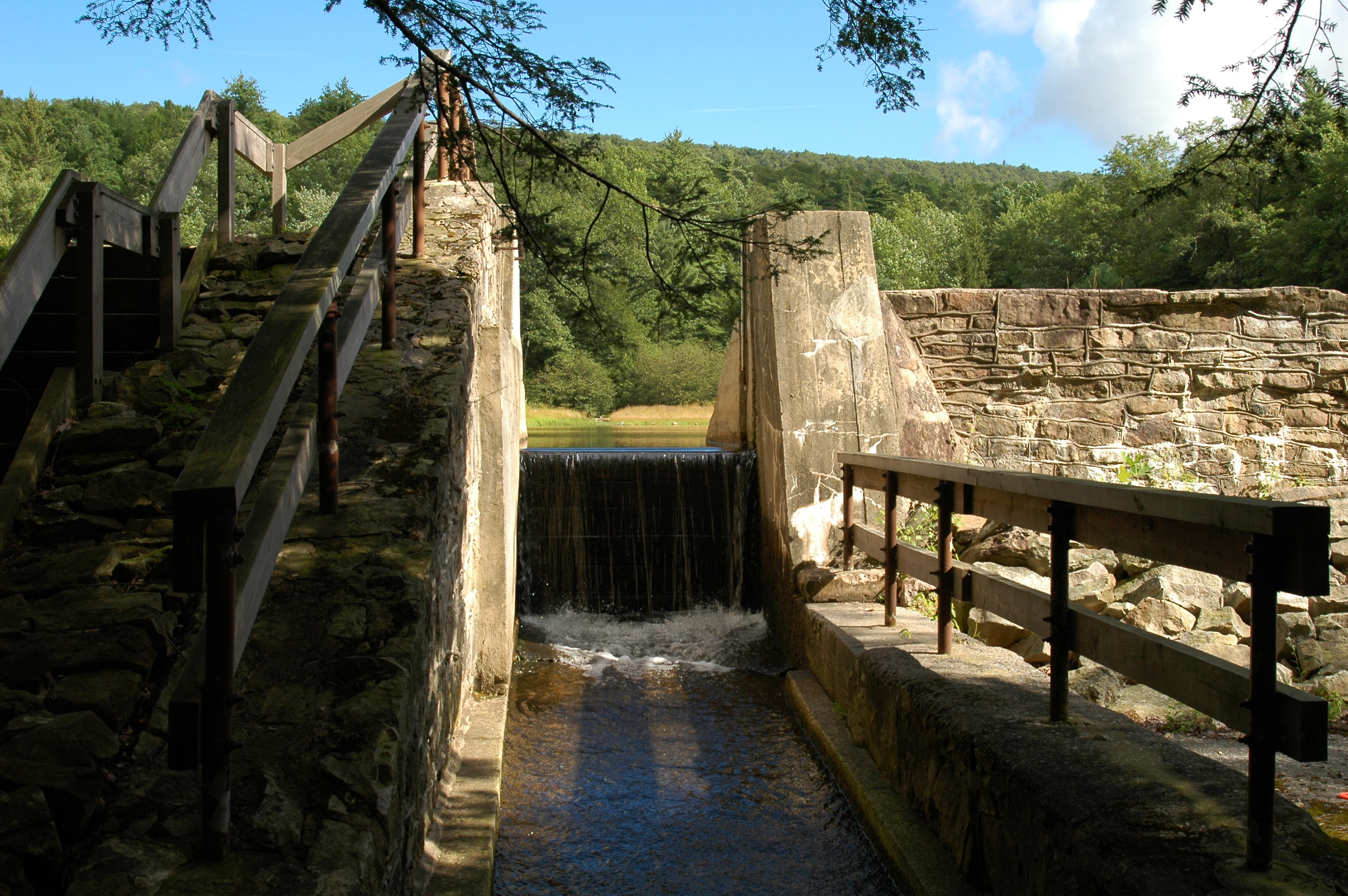

- Location within Pennsylvania Location within the United States
- Interactive map of Penn-Roosevelt State Park
- Location: Harris Township, Centre County, Pennsylvania, United States
- Coordinates: 40°43′36″N 77°42′02″W
- Area: 41 acres (17 ha)
- Elevation: 1,631 feet (497 m)
- Established: 1983
- Administrator: Pennsylvania Department of Conservation and Natural Resources
- Website: Official website
- Pennsylvania State Parks

Penn-Roosevelt State Park is a 41 acres (17 ha) Pennsylvania state park in Harris Township, Centre County, Pennsylvania in the United States. The park is surrounded by Rothrock State Forest. Penn-Roosevelt State Park is 6 miles (9.7 km) from U.S. Route 322 on either Crowfield Road or Stone Creek Road.

== History ==
=== Early settlement ===
The southern portions of Centre County were once inhabited by the Ona Jutta Hage or Juniata tribe. Their name meant "The People of the Standing Stone", for an obelisk that once stood in their village near present-day Huntingdon. The Juniata had moved away by the time that Pennsylvania was colonized by William Penn. Penn bought the land from the Iroquois and the Tuscarora and Shawnee that had resettled throughout central Pennsylvania were soon forced to move on once again. Many different groups of European settlers migrated to the area by the late 18th century. They were mostly farmers of Scots-Irish descent with large numbers of Amish and Mennonite Germans who had fled religious persecution in Germany, Austria, and Switzerland.

=== The lumber era ===
By the mid-19th century the demand for lumber reached southern Centre County, where white pine and hemlock covered the surrounding mountainsides. The Reichley Brothers were the major lumbering concern in the area. In addition to harvesting timber from the hillsides and valleys, they operated an excursion train in the summer months. The train would leave Milroy and climb into the mountains to Poe Mills, Thickhead Mountain, through Stone Creek Kettle, and back to Milroy along the banks of Laurel Creek.

This lumber era was not to last, and soon all the trees were gone. Once the trees disappeared, the people were soon to follow. The lumbermen left behind a barren landscape that was devastated by erosion and wildfires. The Commonwealth of Pennsylvania bought the thousands of acres of deforested and burned land. The state began the massive project of reforesting the land.

=== Civilian Conservation Corps ===
Penn-Roosevelt State Park was constructed during the Great Depression by the Civilian Conservation Corps. CCC Camp S-62 was built in Stone Creek Kettle. It was unique in the fact that it was a segregated camp. The members of the camp were all African-American. It was one of only 12 such CCC camps in Pennsylvania. The members of Camp S-62 constructed many of the facilities in use today at Penn-Roosevelt State Park. They constructed a log-crib dam that has since received a stone facing. They also built many of the roads and trails in the surrounding Rothrock State Forest. Remnants of the camp, including two stone fireplaces and a stone bake oven, can be seen today in the woods of Penn-Roosevelt State Park.

== Recreation ==
Recreational opportunities include picnicking, camping, hiking, horseback riding, cross-country skiing, and snowmobiling. There is a small (3.5 acre) man made lake at the confluence of Sassafras Run and Standing Stone Creek which harbors native brook trout. The stream below the dam is stocked with trout by the Pennsylvania Fish and Boat Commission. Hunting and trapping are not permitted in Penn-Roosevelt State Park, but hunters may use the park to gain access to the surrounding state forest lands. The park also serves as a trailhead for many of the trails that crisscross Pennsylvania. The long-distance Mid State Trail passes through the center of the park. All campsites at the park are rustic, which means that there are no modern restrooms. Campers and RVs are not permitted in the park. Camping facilities are designed to accommodate tents only.

== Wildlife ==
Many species of wildlife can be seen at the park, including white-tailed deer, black bear, wild turkey, raccoons, skunks, muskrats, ducks, geese, and bald eagles.
