= Great Eastern Trail =

Long-distance hiking trail in the United States

- Length: 1,600 mi (2,600 km)
- Trailheads: Florida Trail; North Country Trail
- Use: Hiking
- Difficulty: Moderate to strenuous
- Season: Year-round

The Great Eastern Trail is a network of hiking trails forming a long-distance route in the eastern United States. North of Georgia, the route runs parallel to, and slightly to the west of, the Appalachian Trail. As of 2022, it is still under development and its current length is approximately 1,600 miles (2,600 km). Upon its completion the network is projected to be more than 2,000 miles (3,200 km) in length.

== Description ==
The Great Eastern Trail network mostly consists of previously existing long-distance trails that have been combined to form a multi-state network. Some new connectors between those trails remain to be developed. Hiking northbound, the network is projected to begin in Florida and to pass through Alabama, Georgia, Tennessee, Kentucky, West Virginia, Virginia, Maryland, and Pennsylvania, with its northern terminus at the North Country Trail in western New York State. Much of the route in Florida, Alabama, and Georgia will be shared with the Eastern Continental Trail network.

Upon its completion, the Great Eastern Trail is slated to be added to the US National Trails System. The project received support from the American Hiking Society and the Rivers, Trails, and Conservation Assistance Program of the US National Park Service, but then became an independent entity. The Great Eastern Trail Association was incorporated in Virginia on August 10, 2007, by signatories from the nine states through which the trail passes.

In June 2013 "Hillbilly" Bart Houck of Mullens, West Virginia and Joanna "Someday" Swanson of Willow River, Minnesota became the first to complete a thru-hike on the developed segments of the Great Eastern Trail network from Alabama to New York. In October 2016, Kathy Finch of New Hampshire became the first to complete a southbound thru-hike of the completed segments from New York to Alabama.

== Trails in the network ==
The Great Eastern Trail will be incorporated into portions of the previously existing trails listed below; while several gaps remain to be filled. The list below follows the projected route from south to north.

- Florida Trail
- Connector to be developed in the Florida panhandle and southern Alabama
- Pinhoti Trail in Alabama and Georgia
- Connector to be developed in northwestern Georgia and southeastern Tennessee
- Cumberland Trail in Tennessee (itself under development)
- Connector to be developed around the Tennessee/Kentucky state line
- Pine Mountain Trail in Kentucky (itself under development)
- Connector to be developed from eastern Kentucky to southwestern Virginia
- Brief concurrency with the Appalachian Trail in Virginia and West Virginia
- Allegheny Trail in West Virginia (itself under development)
- Connector to be developed in northeastern West Virginia
- Tuscarora Trail
- Standing Stone Trail
- Mid State Trail
- Finger Lakes Trail
