= Alan Seeger Natural Area =

Protected area in Pennsylvania

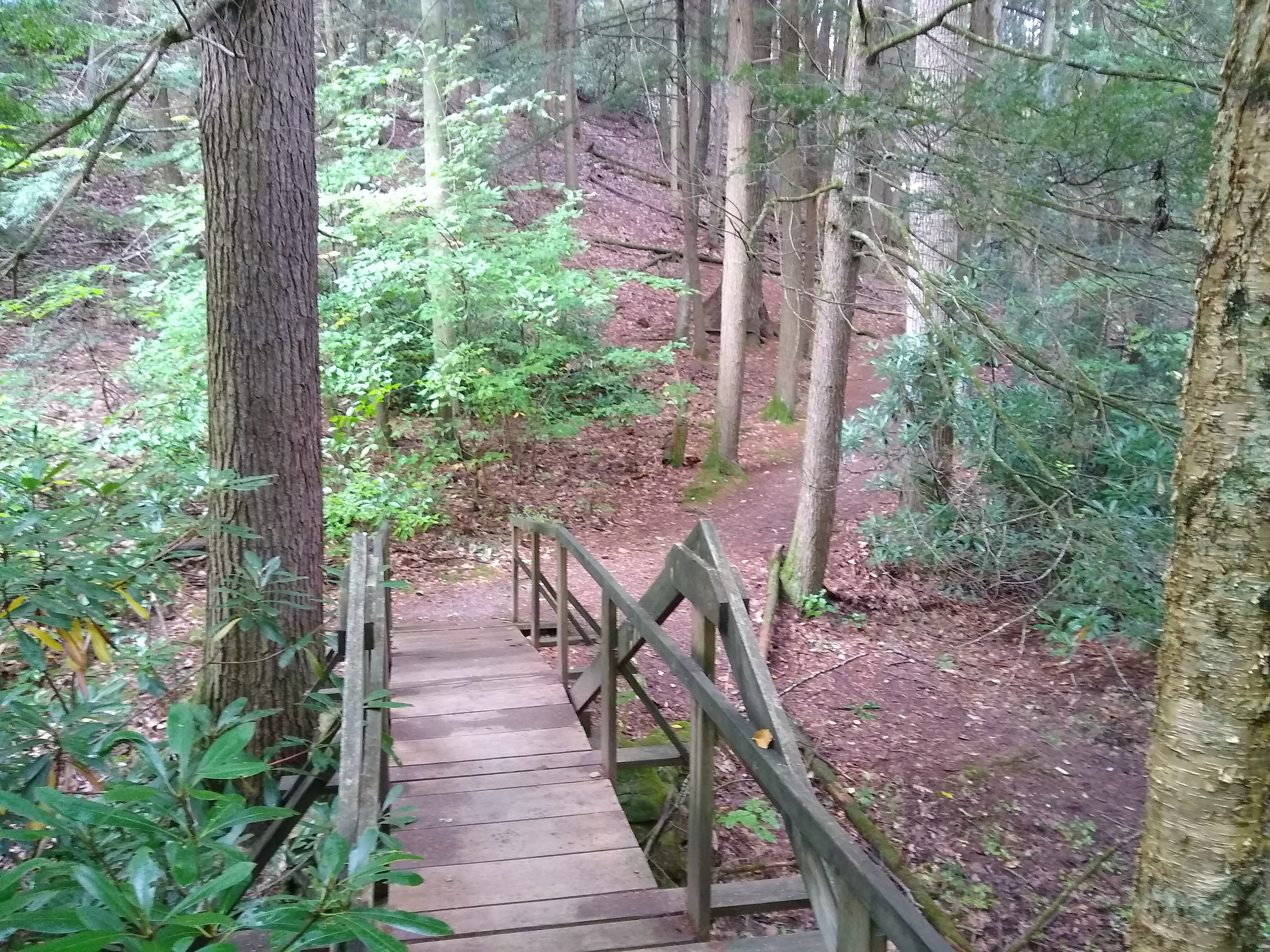
- A footbridge and hiking trail in Alan Seeger Natural Area

- Location within Pennsylvania
- Location: Huntingdon County, Pennsylvania
- Nearest town: Boalsburg
- Coordinates: 40°41′41.1″N 77°45′27.1″W
- Area: 390 acres (160 ha)
- Established: 1921
- Named for: Alan Seeger

Alan Seeger Natural Area is located in Huntingdon County, Pennsylvania, United States, approximately nine miles south of Boalsburg, within Rothrock State Forest in the Appalachian Mountains. It is traversed by the long-distance Standing Stone Trail, and includes other short trails. The natural area is known for old growth trees and extensive copses of giant rhododendron.

== Description ==
Alan Seeger Natural Area was founded in 1921. It was named after Alan Seeger, a noteworthy American poet who died in action while serving with the French Foreign Legion during World War I in 1916. The name was bestowed as a tribute by Colonel Henry Shoemaker, an early Pennsylvania forestry commissioner, though Seeger is not known to have ever visited the region. A loop trail of about three-quarters of a mile in length visits most of the natural area, with several footbridges over upper tributaries of Standing Stone Creek. The eastern half of this trail is also a segment of the 84-mile Standing Stone Trail. The natural area features extensive copses of giant rhododendron.

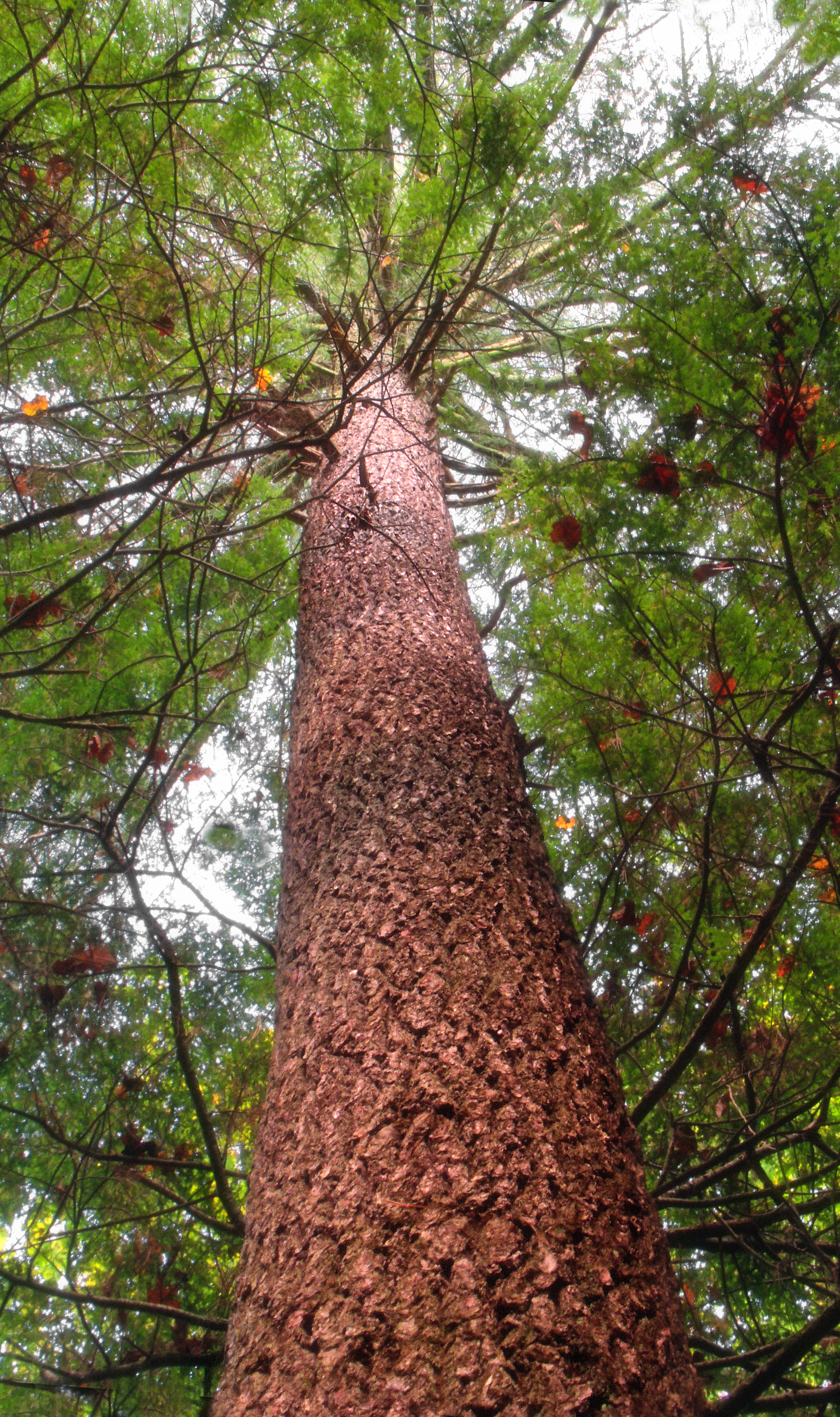
An old growth white pine in Alan Seeger Natural Area

The eastern portion of the natural area features several groves of large old growth hemlock and white pine trees of a stature once seen throughout Pennsylvania. Some specimens here are more than 500 years old. These old trees may have survived the Pennsylvania logging era in the late 1800s due to an undefined boundary; two adjoining logging firms would not dare to accidentally fell each other's trees near the boundary between their holdings, thus creating a no-man's land where the trees survived. It is also possible that one or both companies went out of business before these groves of trees were felled, given known logging company practices of the time. Regardless, the natural area now hosts one of the few remaining groves of old-growth trees in Pennsylvania.

== See also ==
- List of old growth forests
