= Linden Hall, Pennsylvania =

Unincorporated community in Pennsylvania, US

- Unincorporated community
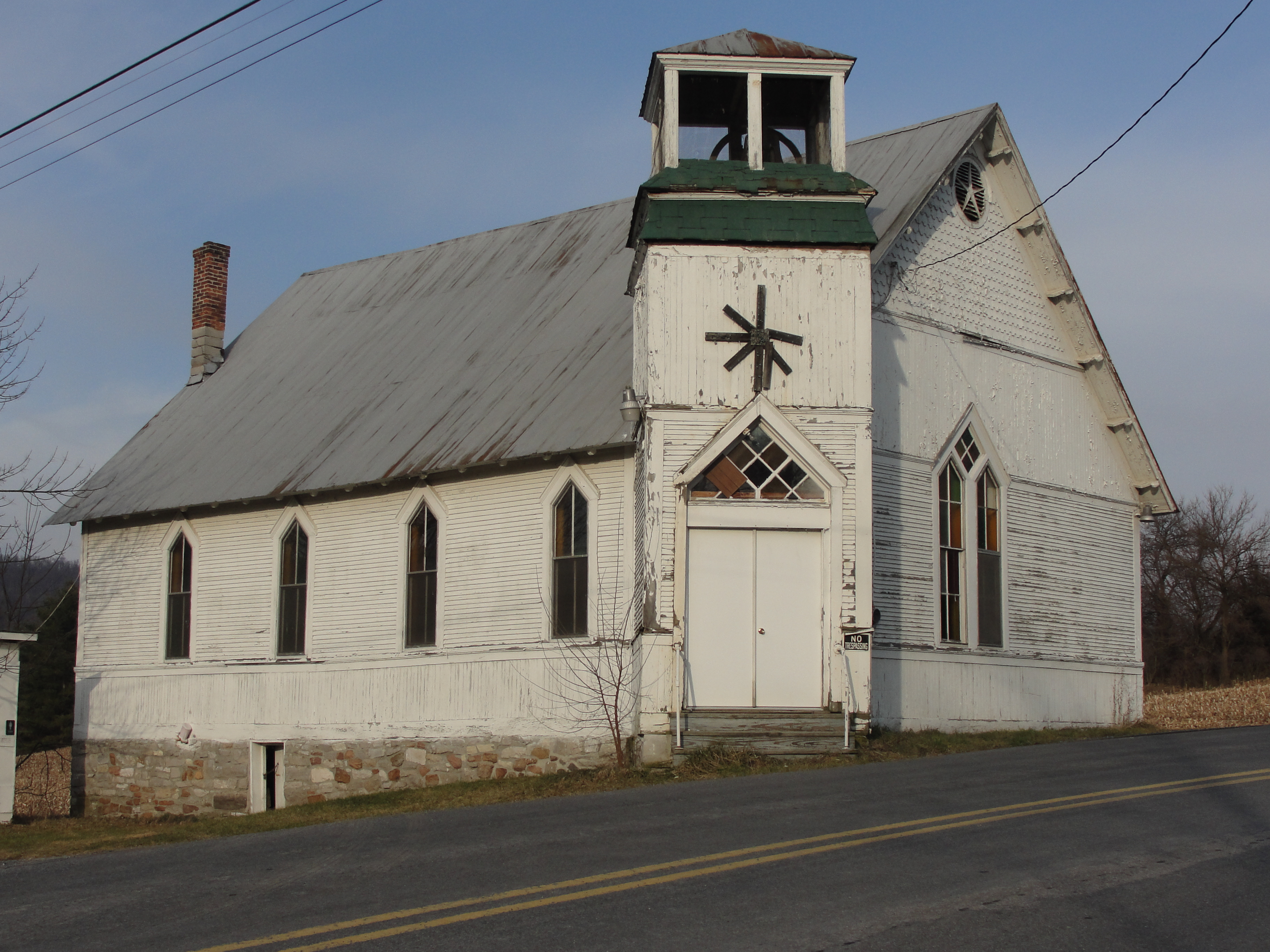
- Dubsite Evangelical Church built in 1897

- Location within the U.S. state of Pennsylvania Linden Hall (the United States)
- Coordinates: 40°47′49.23″N 77°45′39″W
- Country: United States
- State: Pennsylvania
- County: Centre
- Township: Harris
- Elevation: 1,120 ft (340 m)
- Time zone: UTC-5 (Eastern (EST))
  - Summer (DST): UTC-4 (EDT)
- ZIP code: 16828
- GNIS feature ID: 1179410

Linden Hall is a village and an unincorporated community in Harris Township, Centre County, Pennsylvania, United States. It is in Happy Valley and Cedar Run Valley which is part of the larger Nittany Valley. The Lewisburg and Tyrone Railroad built through Linden Hall in 1884 and established a station. Rail service ended due to damage from Hurricane Agnes in June 1972, and the line was formally abandoned by the Penn Central in May 1973. It once had four stores, a shoe manufacturer, a grain elevator, lumber and coal yard, gristmill, distillery.

== Linden Hall Historic District ==
Linden Hall was added to the National Register of Historic Places in 1990.
