= Detweiler Run Natural Area =

Natural area in Pennsylvania

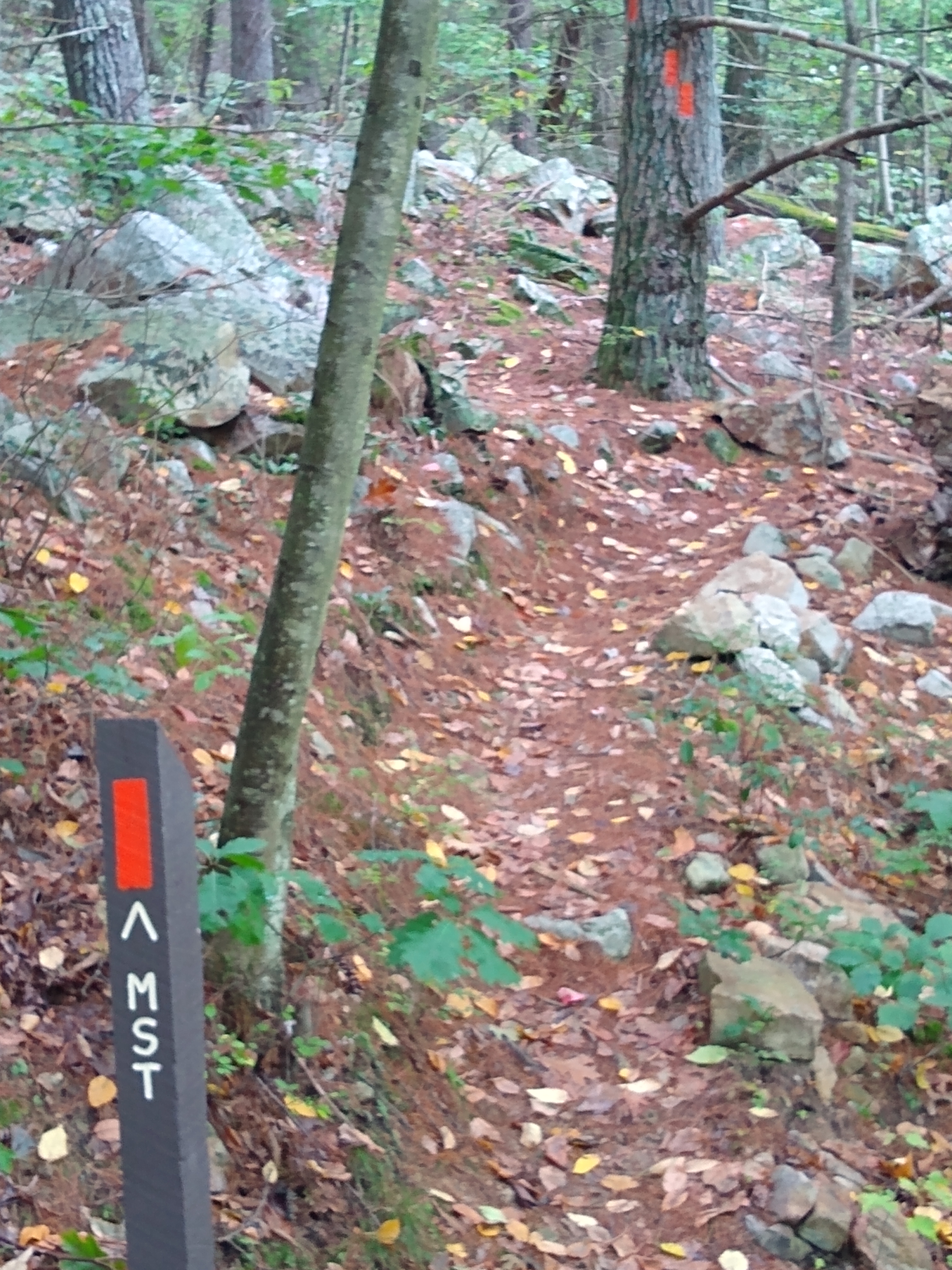
- The Mid State Trail in Detweiler Run Wild Area

- Location within Pennsylvania
- Location: Huntingdon County, Pennsylvania
- Nearest town: Boalsburg
- Coordinates: 40°43′19″N 77°44′14″W
- Area: 463 acres (187 ha)

Detweiler Run Natural Area is a 463-acre (187 ha) protected area in Huntingdon County, Pennsylvania, United States. It is part of Rothrock State Forest. It is surrounded by Thickhead Mountain Wild Area.

== Description ==
The Natural Area was established to protect a grove of old-growth hemlock and white pine trees. These trees survived the Pennsylvania logging era, likely because they were near an undefined boundary between two competing logging firms. The area is managed by Pennsylvania as an Important Bird Area and it is also known for hosting many species of butterflies. It is traversed by the Mid State Trail and the northernmost segment of the Standing Stone Trail.
