= Little Juniata Natural Area =

Natural area in Pennsylvania

- Location within Pennsylvania
- Location: Huntingdon County, Pennsylvania
- Nearest town: Barree
- Coordinates: 40°36′12″N 78°07′15″W
- Area: 624 acres (253 ha)

Little Juniata Natural Area is a 624-acre (253 ha) protected area in Huntingdon County, Pennsylvania, United States. It is part of Rothrock State Forest.

== Description ==
The Natural Area was established to protect an undeveloped segment of the Little Juniata River that is known for its unique geology, including a thrust fault and a talus slope of Tuscarora sandstone. The area is centered around a water gap carved by the river through in the ridgeline known as Tussey Mountain. In turn, this is one of the few water gaps in Pennsylvania that was never developed for transportation, though the present Natural Area includes a segment of an old railroad grade with a stone bridge over the river.
