= Moshannon Valley Correctional Center =

Immigration detention facility in Pennsylvania, United States

- Interactive map of Moshannon Valley Correctional Center
- Location: 555 Geo Drive, Decatur Township, Clearfield County, Pennsylvania coordinates = 40°55′22″N 78°14′30″W
- Status: Open
- Security class: Immigration detention facility
- Capacity: 1,878
- Opened: November 2021
- Managed by: GEO Group

The Moshannon Valley Correctional Center or Moshannon Valley Processing Center is an Immigration & Customs Enforcement building located in Decatur Township, Clearfield County, Pennsylvania, just outside of the borough of Philipsburg in the larger Moshannon Valley area. The facility is privately operated by the GEO Group under contract with the U.S. Immigration and Customs Enforcement. It has a capacity of 1,878 and is the largest ICE detention center in the Northeast United States. It originally closed on March 31, 2021, after the Federal Bureau of Prisons decided to not exercise the contract renewal option. The facility opened back up in November 2021 after receiving a contract with ICE.

== History ==
The facility began accepting prisoners in April 2006 and continued to expand up until originally closing in 2021. At opening it was the first privately owned prison in Pennsylvania. It housed low-security, nonviolent criminal aliens who had less than 5 years on their remaining sentences.

In September 2013 the future of Moshannon Valley's continued operation was said to hinge on a federal contractual decision between this facility and the Northeast Ohio Correctional Center, privately run by the Corrections Corporation of America near Youngstown, Ohio.

In December 2014 Moshannon Valley's contract was renewed by the Federal government for 5 years, with 5 one year options after that for a total of 10 years.

In August 2016, Justice Department officials announced that the FBOP would be phasing out its use of all contracted facilities, on the grounds that private prisons provided less safe and less effective services with no substantial cost savings. The agency expected to allow current contracts on its thirteen remaining private facilities to expire.

In January 2021, it was announced that the Federal Bureau of Prisons had decided to not exercise the contract renewal option for the facility, and would allow the contract to end on March 31, 2021. GEO was expected to market the building to other federal and state agencies. Moshannon Valley Economic Development Partnership President Bryan Bennett said the closing was the worst economical news for the area in years, saying "The upcoming closure of the GEO Moshannon Valley facility is the worst economic news that we have received in our region in over twenty years. MVEDP believes it essential that local leaders now work with GEO Group representatives to determine if there will be any reuse opportunities."

In August 2021, it was revealed that the GEO Group had contracted the building to ICE (U.S. Immigration and Customs Enforcement) to become a detention facility. Interest in the facility from ICE came when they lost a major contract with York County Jail last year. On September 28, 2021, the Clearfield County Commissioners approved a five-year contract that began in November 2021 and will run through November 2026. The facility will see some upgrades such as, and new 'no-climb' perimeter fencing. Local officials predict approximately 200 jobs were restored to the area with the potential for an additional 100 if the facility reaches capacity. Once released, detainees will be taken to either Pittsburgh or Philadelphia for travel to their final destination. The detainees will spend an average of 2–4 weeks at the institution before being relocated.

During the second presidency of Donald Trump, the facility served as a major facility for immigrants apprehended by ICE in the New York and Philadelphia regions. The facility has received complaints about abusive conditions, with civil rights advocates describing it as "an oppressive environment that seemed more like a prison for convicted criminals than a temporary holding center for immigrants."

== Notable inmates ==
Inmate Name	Register Number	Status	Details
David Radler	18189-424	Sentenced to 29 months; transferred FCI Ray Brook and then to Canada in September 2008; paroled from Ferndale Institution December 2008.	Pleaded guilty to mail fraud. Former associate of Conrad Black and CEO of Ravelston Corporation.
Kareem Serageldin	68423-054	Sentenced on November 22, 2013, to serve 30 months in prison, which he began serving on January 28, 2014; released on March 25, 2016.	Convicted of conspiracy to artificially inflate subprime mortgage bond prices in order to conceal hundreds of millions of dollars in losses in Credit Suisse's mortgage-backed securities portfolio.
Hasan Ali Moh'D Saleh		Pronounced dead by medical professionals at 7:13 p.m. on October 11.	
Leo Cruz-Silva		A 34-year-old Mexican national, died on October 4 at the Ste. Genevieve County Jail in Missouri, in "what looked like a suicide attempt," ICE said.	
Huabing Xie		A Chinese national, died on September 29, after being transported from the Imperial Regional Detention Facility to El Centro Regional Medical Center in California.	
Chaofeng Ge		Held for 4 days as part of 6-12 month sentence for credit card fraud; died in custody on August 6, 2025, with hands and feet bound behind his back.	Arrested by ICE on July 31. 32-year-old Flushing, Queens resident.
Subramanyam Vedam		Detained after being released from SCI Huntingdon.	

== See also ==
- List of detention sites in the United States
