= Mid State Trail (Pennsylvania) =

Hiking trail in central Pennsylvania, United States

Coordinates: 39.79337°N 78.54675°W

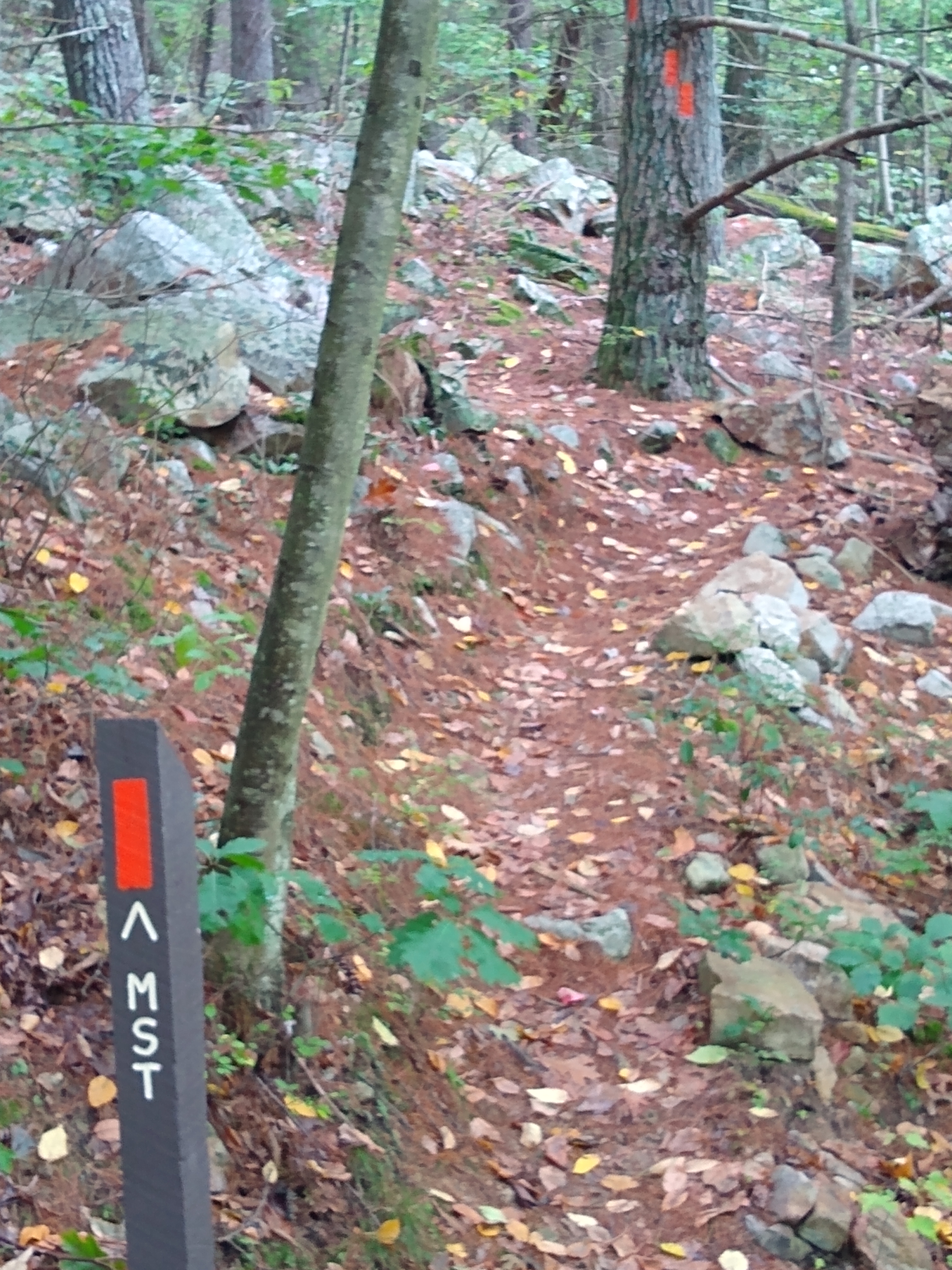
- The Mid State Trail in Detweiler Run Natural Area, Huntingdon County
- Length: 526 km (327 mi)
- Location: Central Pennsylvania, US
- Trailheads: South: Maryland border north of Flintstone, Maryland. North: New York State border near Lawrenceville, Pennsylvania
- Use: Hiking
- Elevation change: Very high
- Highest point: Martin Hill, in Bedford County, 829 m (2,720 ft)
- Lowest point: Road crossing of the West Branch Susquehanna River in Clinton County, 195 m (640 ft)
- Difficulty: Moderate to strenuous
- Season: Year-round
- Hazards: Uneven and wet terrain, rattlesnakes, mosquitoes, ticks, black bears

The Mid State Trail (MST) is a 526-kilometre (327 mi) linear hiking trail located in the Appalachian Mountains and Allegheny Plateau of central Pennsylvania, United States. It is the longest hiking trail in Pennsylvania, and one of just three (with the Appalachian Trail and North Country Trail) to traverse the state from one border to another. A portion of the Mid State Trail is also part of the Great Eastern Trail.

The Mid State Trail is known for its feeling of remoteness, though it is never more than 2 kilometres (1.2 mi) from a road. It is mostly on public lands, including state forest and state game lands, and it passes through numerous state parks, wild areas, and natural areas. In its southern half, the MST mostly follows rocky ridgetops in the ridge and valley province and reaches dozens of expansive vistas. The northern segment of the trail traverses slightly less rugged but still challenging landscapes on top of the Allegheny Plateau.

The original route of the trail extended from near Alexandria on US Route 22 in Huntingdon County, to the West Rim Trail near Blackwell in Tioga County. It has since been extended to both the south and north, reaching from Maryland to New York and connecting with other trails in those states.

The MST is marked by orange blazes, with some spur trails to nearby points of interest marked by blue blazes. The MST holds the distinction of being measured entirely in metric, with all guidebooks and signs using metric distances while maps also show metric elevations. It was the first significant hiking trail in the United States to do so. This is because the founder of the trail, Tom Thwaites, was a proponent of converting America to the metric system.

== Route ==
The Mid State Trail is traditionally described from south to north, and has been divided into four sections.

=== Everett Region ===
The MST begins at the southern edge of Pennsylvania, at the Maryland border north of Flintstone, Maryland. That state's Green Ridge Hiking Trail reaches the border, and continues into Pennsylvania as the Mid State Trail. After some road walking, the MST enters Buchanan State Forest and climbs to the top of Tussey Mountain, staying on top of this ridgeline (with a few gaps) for about 200 kilometres (120 mi) ahead and following it primarily to the northeast. Above Rainsburg the MST crosses PA Route 326 and enters State Game Lands 97.

South of Everett, the MST descends and crosses the Raystown Branch of the Juniata River on a rural road bridge, then walks through Everett and uses a street under the US Route 30 expressway. The MST then climbs up the next segment of Tussey Mountain and passes through multiple tracts of State Game Lands 73. Another abrupt break in the ridge must be tackled at Loysburg Gap, along Beaver Creek and PA Route 36. The MST continues to the northeast through more of State Game Lands 73 and then State Game Lands 118. Above Williamsburg, the MST descends, follows rural roads and city streets through the town, then joins the Lower Trail (a rail-trail) and walks easily for about 18 kilometres (11 mi), alongside the Frankstown Branch of the Juniata River. The MST crosses US Route 22 at a parking lot for the bike trail, west of Alexandria.

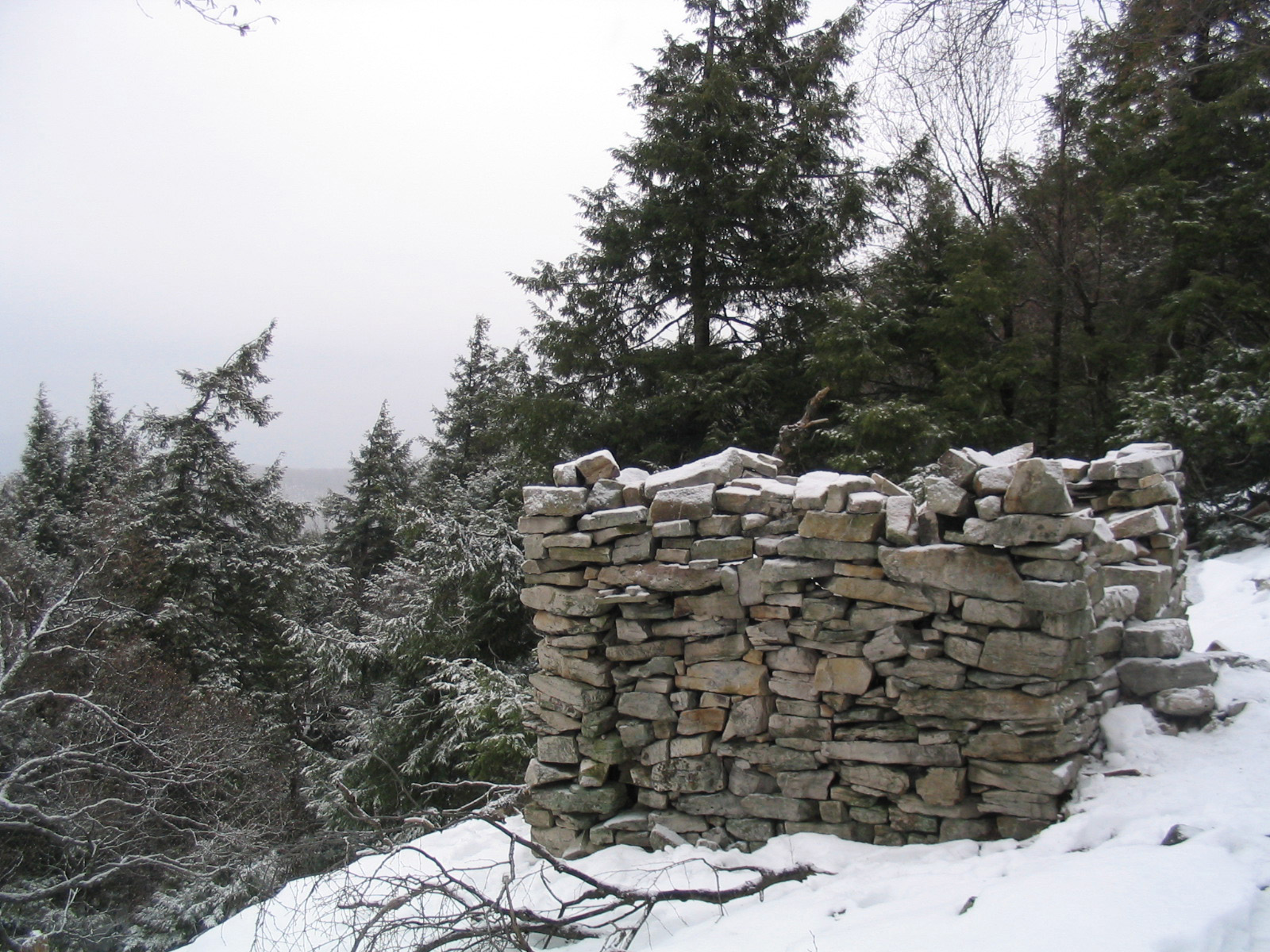
The "Roman Tower" on the Mid State Trail in Centre County

=== State College Region ===
North of US Route 22, the MST climbs up the next segment of Tussey Mountain and enters Rothrock State Forest. It crosses PA Route 26 above Pine Grove Mills in an area that features several vistas of State College and Penn State University. The trail walks along the ridgeline around three sides of Bear Meadows Natural Area, passes through the smaller Big Flat Laurel Natural Area, then finally reaches the end of Tussey Mountain and rises to the top of Thickhead Mountain. The trail next reaches a junction with the Standing Stone Trail at Detweiler Run Natural Area. The trail then walks through Penn-Roosevelt State Park, and later uses a culvert to pass under the US Route 322 expressway near Potters Mills.

Next, the trail walks through Poe Valley State Park and then Poe Paddy State Park; at the latter it uses a former railroad bridge over Penns Creek and then a defunct railroad tunnel through a ridgeline. Poe Paddy State Park also includes a junction with the Reeds Gap Spur Trail, which leads southwest 22.4 kilometres (13.9 mi) to Reeds Gap State Park. Now in Bald Eagle State Forest, the MST trends to the north and climbs up and down several ridgelines, crossing PA Route 45 and then PA Route 192 at R.B. Winter State Park.

=== Woolrich Region ===
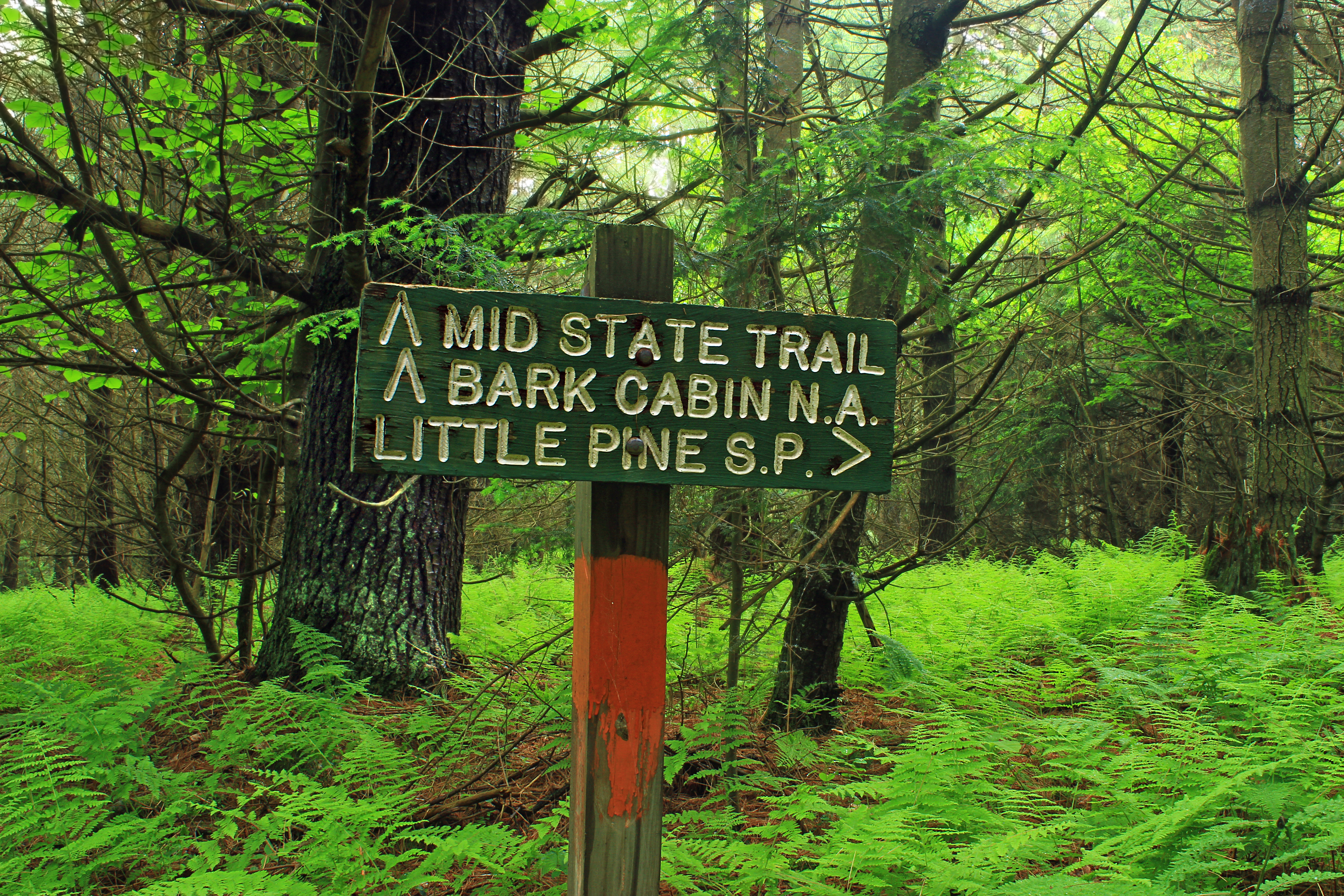
The Mid State Trail in Lycoming County

North of R.B. Winter State Park, the MST continues to climb up and down several different ridgelines and uses a rural road overpass to cross Interstate 80 to the east of its interchange with PA Route 880. Now trending primarily to the north, the MST passes into Tiadaghton State Forest, walks through Ravensburg State Park, and crosses PA Route 880. North of that park, the MST follows a segment of the Native American Great Island Path, reenters Bald Eagle State Forest, and descends to the valley of the West Branch Susquehanna River. The trail uses a rural road to pass under the US Route 220 expressway, then uses another road to cross the river between Avis and Jersey Shore.

After crossing PA Route 150, the MST traverses company lands owned by the Woolrich corporation and takes hikers past the company store. (This segment of the trail is sometimes closed.) After continuing through some low valley areas with a few farms, the MST next reenters Tiadaghton State Forest and rises to the top of the Allegheny Plateau. It then reaches Pine Creek Gorge and tackles a particularly difficult gap, descending to Pine Creek near the town of Ramsey, crossing the river on a defunct railroad bridge that also serves the Pine Creek Rail Trail, then encountering PA Route 44. The MST then climbs very steeply back to the top of the plateau. The trail walks through Little Pine State Park, continuing through various parcels of Tiadaghton State Forest and State Game Lands 75. The MST then enters Tioga State Forest and descends into the canyon formed by Babb Creek, walking through the town of Blackwell via PA Route 414 and briefly joining the Pine Creek Rail Trail again in Pine Creek Gorge.

=== Tioga Region ===
North of Blackwell, the Mid State Trail has been routed and mapped, but as of 2022 some segments are still under development. The trail climbs back out of Pine Creek Gorge toward the top of the Allegheny Plateau again. It crosses PA Route 287 near Antrim, then continues north while exiting Tiadaghton State Forest. Most of the rest of the trail is on private lands through which passage has been negotiated with landowners. The MST crosses US Route 6 roughly halfway between Wellsboro and Mansfield, then walks through Hills Creek State Park followed by State Game Lands 37. The trail skirts the west side of Hammond Lake, crosses PA Route 287 again, then continues north through lightly developed rural areas. Approaching the New York border, the trail reaches the shore of Cowanesque Lake, follows the south shore parallel to PA Route 49, then makes a U-turn and follows the north shore. The MST then leaves the lake, continues to the north, and reaches the New York border after 526 kilometres (327 mi) in Pennsylvania. The footpath continues to the north into New York as the Crystal Hills Trail, a branch of the Finger Lakes Trail.
