= Rothrock State Forest =

State forest in Pennsylvania, United States

- IUCN category VI (protected area with sustainable use of natural resources)
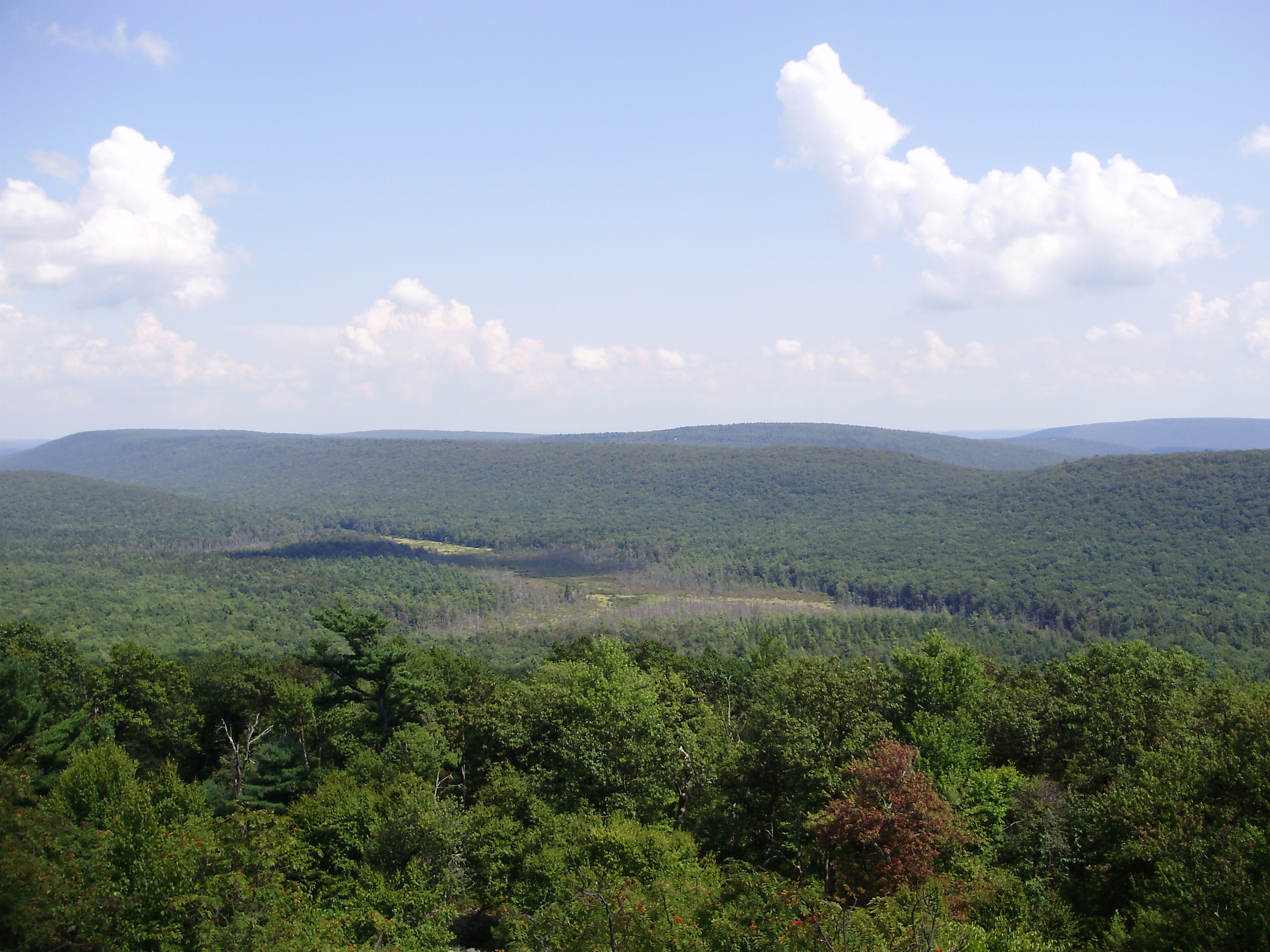
- View of Bear Meadows Natural Area from the Mid State Trail.

- Location within Pennsylvania
- Location: Pennsylvania, United States
- Coordinates: 40°42′36″N 77°49′06″W
- Area: 215,500 acres (872 km^{2})
- Elevation: 1,936 ft (590 m)
- Named for: Joseph Rothrock
- Governing body: Pennsylvania Department of Conservation and Natural Resources
- Website: Rothrock State Forest

Rothrock State Forest is a Pennsylvania state forest in Pennsylvania Bureau of Forestry District #5. The main offices are located in Huntingdon in Huntingdon County, Pennsylvania in the United States.

Rothrock State Forest is located in Centre, Huntingdon, and Mifflin Counties.

State College, home of Penn State University is only a few miles from many of the entrances of Rothrock, leading to high utilization of the forest by students and staff of the university. Rothrock shares a common border on its eastern portion with Bald Eagle State Forest and is just north of areas of Tuscarora State Forest.

== History ==
Rothrock State Forest was formed as a direct result of the depletion of the forests of Pennsylvania that took place during the mid-to-late 19th century. Conservationists like Dr. Joseph Rothrock, for whom the forest is named, became concerned that the forests would not regrow if they were not managed properly. Lumber and iron companies had harvested the old-growth forests for various reasons. They clear cut the forests and left behind nothing but dried treetops and rotting stumps. The sparks of passing steam locomotives ignited wildfires that prevented the formation of second growth forests. The conservationists feared that the forest would never regrow if there was not a change in the philosophy of forest management. They called for the state to purchase land from the lumber and iron companies. The lumber and iron companies were more than willing to sell their land since they had depleted the natural resources of the forests. The changes began to take place in 1895 when Dr. Rothrock was appointed the first commissioner of the Pennsylvania Department of Forests and Waters, the forerunner of today's Pennsylvania Department of Conservation and Natural Resources. The Pennsylvania General Assembly passed a piece of legislation in 1897 that authorized the purchase of "unseated lands for forest reservations". This was the beginning of the State Forest system.

Two of Dr. Rothrock's major accomplishments as commissioner were his land acquisition program and the creation of a forest academy to train foresters for state service. He led the effort in central Pennsylvania to acquire land that had once belonged to the Greenwood Iron Works. The iron company had left behind approximately 35,000 acres (14,000 ha) of land that had been stripped of its old growth forest to provide fuel in the form of charcoal for the iron furnaces in northern Huntingdon County. Additional land was purchased soon after until nearly all of the Seven Mountain area had become state property. The lands acquired in the early 20th century were divided into three separate state forest reserves. Logan State Forest comprised the land in northern Huntingdon County and Ferguson and Harris, Townships in Centre County. Penn State Forest was located in Potter Township, Centre County and Armagh Township and Brown Township, Townships in Mifflin County. Rothrock State Forest was near Mount Union and Entriken, in Huntingdon County. The three forests were merged in 1953 with parts of Penn and Logan being added to Bald Eagle State Forest and the rest combined to make what is now Rothrock State Forest.

Some of the first fire towers built in Pennsylvania were constructed in Rothrock State Forest in the 1920s. Pennsylvania Governor Gifford Pinchot, former chief of the U.S. Forest Service upgraded the Pennsylvania Forestry Division to full department status and gave the new Department of Forest and Waters the funds needed to build steel observation towers in the state forests. The construction of the observation towers combined with changes in forest management lead to a dramatic decrease in the number and size of forest fires throughout the state forests of Pennsylvania.

Much of the land that is now Rothrock State Forest was cleared of dried underbrush during the Great Depression by the young men of the Civilian Conservation Corps created by President Franklin D. Roosevelt. In addition to clearing the forests and streams of brush the CCC also built roads and trails in the state forests and parks and many of the recreational facilities still in use at the state parks in the Rothrock State Forest area.

By the 1950s the second growth forests of oak and hickory had grown to a size that the wood was ready to be harvested for lumber. A scientific forestry management plan was put into place in 1955. The timber management plan was expanded to a natural resource management plan in 1985. The new management plan covers the management of water, wildlife, timber, fire protection and recreation. Recreational use of the Rothrock State Forest has grown in the last several decades. All visitors are asked to learn and comply with all state forest regulations while using and respecting the forest and its facilities.

== Neighboring state forest districts ==
- Sproul State Forest (north)
- Bald Eagle State Forest (northeast)
- Tuscarora State Forest (east)
- Buchanan State Forest (south)
- Gallitzin State Forest (west)
- Moshannon State Forest (northwest)

== Nearby state parks ==
Four PA State Parks are located within Rothrock State Forest:

- Greenwood Furnace State Park
- Penn-Roosevelt State Park
- Trough Creek State Park
- Whipple Dam State Park

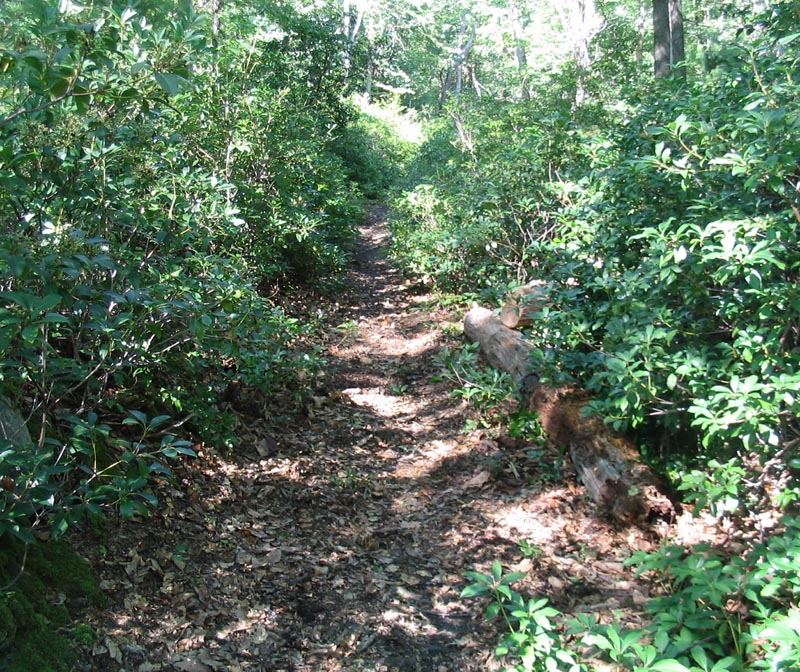
Sassafrass Trail near Greenwood Furnace State Park

== Events ==
Various events are held in Rothrock each year including the Wilderness 101, a 101-mile (163 km) mountain bike race, and the Tussey MountainBack 50 Mile Relay, a 50-mile (80 km) race and Ultramarathon, and the Stoopid 50 mountain bike race. In 2005 the Single Speed World Championship race was held in Rothrock. The Trans-Sylvania Mountain Bike Epic 7-day Stage Race is held annually in the park, with stages in both Rothrock and Bald Eagle State Forests.

=== 2006 fire ===
On May 1, 2006, a wildfire from a downed power line burned more than 420 acres (170 hectares) largely within Rothrock State Forest. The Tussey Mountain Trail transects the burned area, showcasing springtime wildflowers and grasses among the charred trees. This trail has become a regional favorite among mountain cyclists, trail runners, and hikers alike.

== Stewardship ==
Rothrock State forest is managed by the Pennsylvania Department of Conservation and Natural Resources (DCNR). Numerous advocacy groups exist to promote sustainable land management in and around the Forest, including Nittany Mountain Bike Association, Friends of Rothrock State Forest, Clearwater Conservancy, and the Pennsylvania Parks & Forests Foundation.

== Other attractions ==
=== Mountain biking ===
==== Opportunities ====
Numerous mountain biking trails can be found throughout Rothrock State Forest. It is one of the premier mountain bike destinations in the state, as evidenced by the world class race events held here annually. Shingletown Gap and Coopers Gap are two areas that have a high concentration of popular mountain bike trails. Rothrock has two IMBA Epic rides; each uses trails in these two separate Gaps.

==== Navigation ====
Many cyclists and hikers use a Rothrock Purple Lizard Map to navigate of the forest. Additional print maps and resources can be found on the Keystone Trails Association website and IMBA’s website. Free print maps are available from the DCNR Rothrock State Forest webpage or Nittany Mountain Bike Association’s site. Many trails have been mapped on OpenStreetMap, as well.

=== Hiking ===
The Rothrock State Forest contains nearly 300 miles of hiking trails. The Pennsylvania Mid State Trail (MST), a 326-mile cross-country trail running from the Green Ridge State Forest in Maryland to a spur of the Finger Lakes trail in New York, crosses the Rothrock State Forest for about 42 miles. In addition to the MST and miles of local hiking trails, Rothrock State Forest includes roughly 16 miles of the 70+ miles long Standing Stone Trail (SST).

Trails to the scenic fire tower (closed for climbing, but still an aesthetic attraction) are also available via the MST and Little Flat Trail.

=== Horseback riding ===
Horses may be ridden on most of Rothrock's hundreds of miles of trails and state forest roads, although many shared-use trails are excessively rocky and bridges often not suitable. Horses are not permitted on the Pennsylvania Mid State Trail (MST), Standing Stone Trail (SST), or in Natural Areas. Areas of the forest around Trough Creek State Park and Greenwood Furnace State Park are popular horse riding areas, with numerous suitable trails.

=== Dual sport motorcycle trails ===
There are no dual-sport motorcycle trails in Rothrock State Forest. Neighboring Bald Eagle State Forest has one of the largest motorcycle trail systems in the state. Street legal motorcycles are allowed to ride the public roads in Rothrock, and this is a popular destination for motorcyclists.

== Natural and wild areas ==
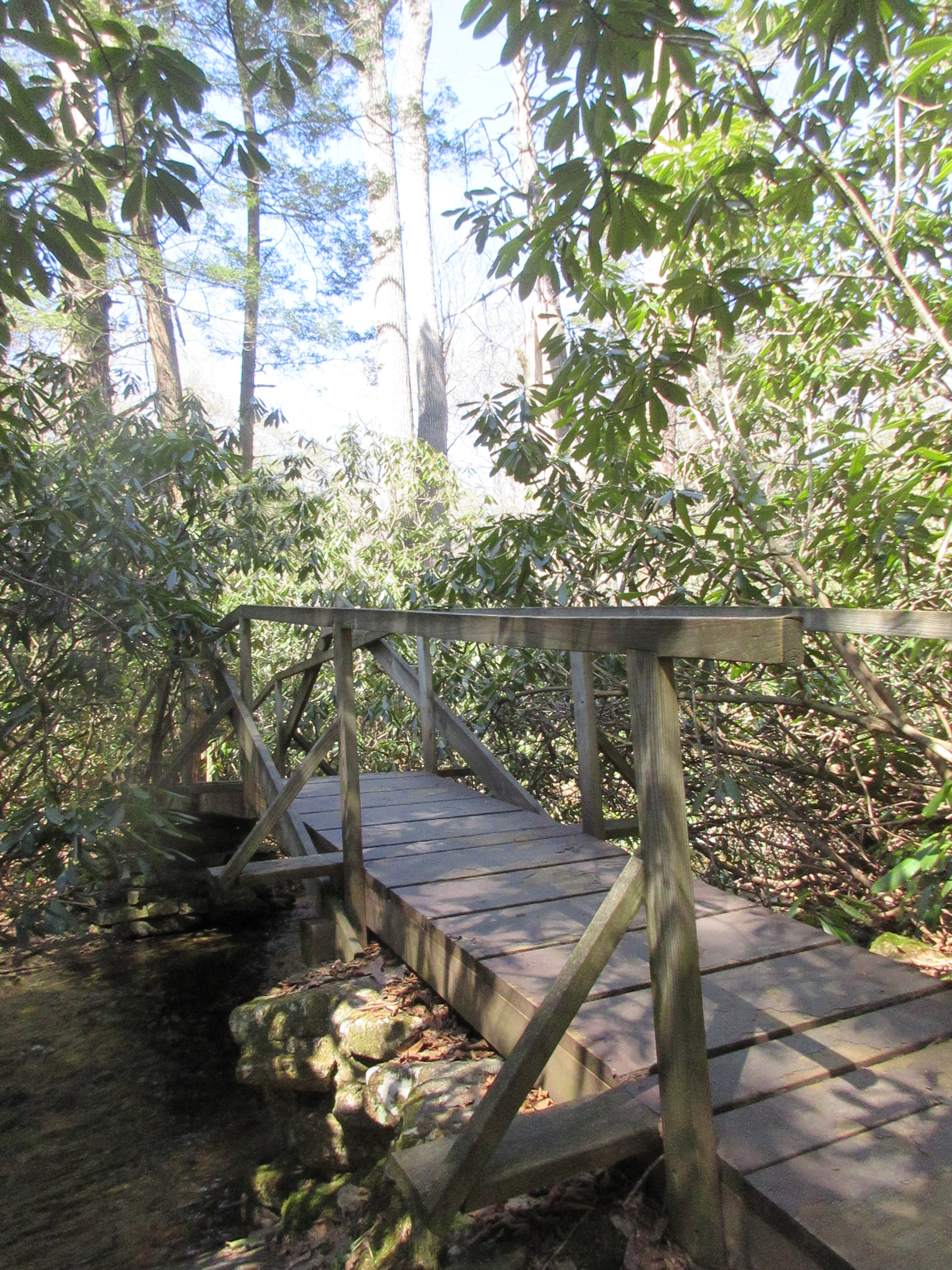
A trail crosses a rhododendron-lined creek in the Alan Seeger Natural Area.

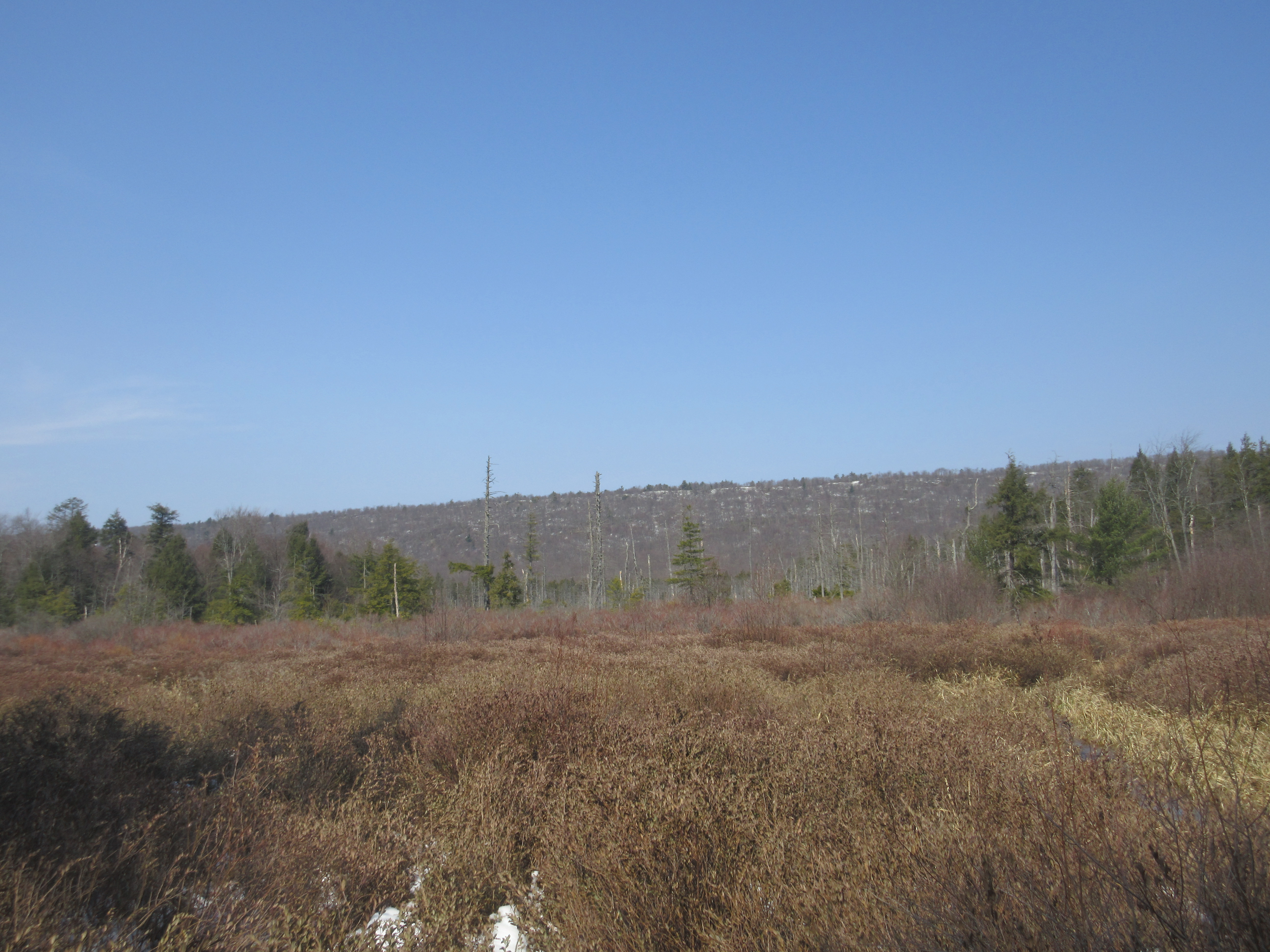
Bear Meadows Natural Area is centered on a wetland environment.

- Alan Seeger Natural Area: Huntingdon County, 390 acres (160 ha) north of Greenwood Furnace State Park. Includes about 25 acres (10 ha) of old-growth Eastern white pine and Eastern hemlock, with some trees 4.5 feet (1.4 m) in diameter and nearly 1,000 years old.
- Bear Meadows Natural Area: Centre County, 890 acres (360 ha) four miles south of Boalsburg. Protects a 320 acres (130 ha) boreal bog with old-growth black spruce and balsam fir forests.
- Big Flat Laurel Natural Area: Huntingdon and Centre Counties, 184 acres (74 ha) four miles south of Boalsburg. Includes extensive stands of mountain laurel.
- Detweiler Run Natural Area: Huntingdon County, 463 acres (187 ha) southeast of Boalsburg. Includes 185 acres (75 ha) of old-growth eastern white pine and Eastern hemlock forests above a Rhododendron understory.
- Little Juniata Natural Area: Huntingdon County, 624 acres (253 ha) west of Barree. Includes a slope of Tuscarora sandstone scree and a horizontal thrust fault.
- Rocky Ridge Natural Area: Huntingdon County, 150 acres (61 ha) south of Martin Gap. Includes exposed sandstone and limestone beneath an oak woodland.
- Thickhead Mountain Wild Area: Centre and Huntingdon counties, 4,886 acres (1,977 ha). Forested ridges and mountains with over 50 acres (20 ha) of old-growth ridgetop Chestnut Oak forests including trees up to 350 years old.
- Trough Creek Wild Area: Huntingdon County, 1,703 acres (689 ha).
