= Finger Lakes Trail =

Long-distance hiking trail in the United States

The Finger Lakes Trail consists of a network of trails in New York. The trail system is administered by the Finger Lakes Trail Conference (FLTC), a non-profit 501(c)(3) organization composed primarily of volunteers.

== Description ==
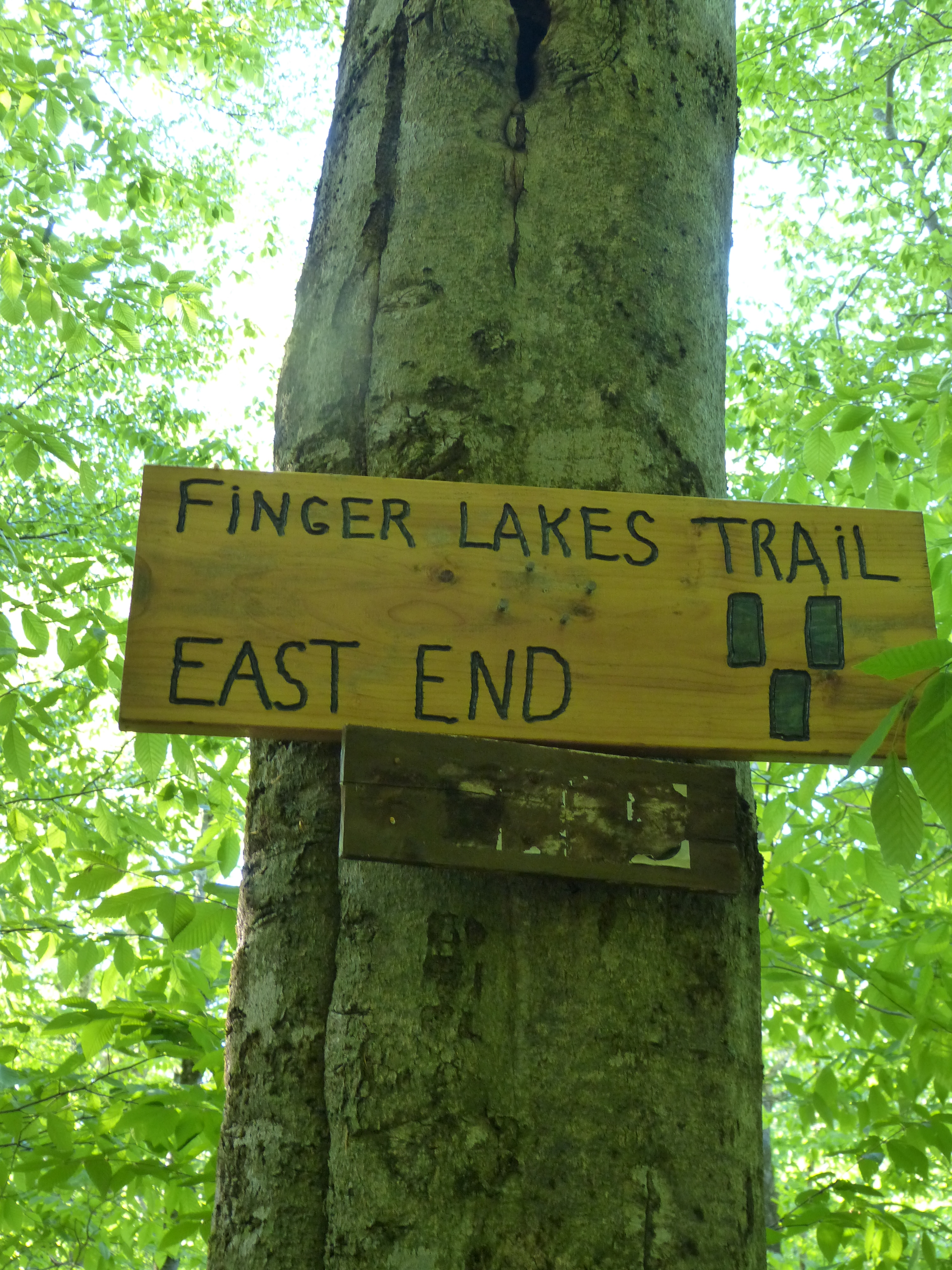
Former eastern terminus of the trail in the Catskill Park, where it meets the Long Path.

The FLT is primarily designated as a footpath only trail. The main trail (FLT) is 584 miles (940 km) long and extends from the New York-Pennsylvania border from Allegany State Park in southwestern New York to the Catskill Forest Preserve in eastern New York. There is an additional 400+ miles (643+ km) of branch and loop segments that branch off the main FLT—six branch trails and several loop and side trails. The FLT is part of the 4,800 mile North Country National Scenic Trail (NCNST) and affiliates with the North Country Trail Association as a partner organization. The NCNST uses approximately 424 miles of the FLT as it crosses New York from Allegany State Park and into Madison County.

The Trail System passes over a mixture of public and private land, and also public roads where there is no public or private land available. The main FLT crosses through many New York state parks, state forests and wildlife management areas. The FLT also crosses through the only national forest in New York State and over an additional 400 private landowners property.

It is maintained by volunteers from 15 organizations and approximately 60 individual and family trail sponsors, except for personnel of the NYSDEC Operations Crew who maintain the trail in the Catskills. The US Forest Service maintains the Interloken Trail in the Finger Lakes National Forest.

The highest elevation on the entire FLT is ~4,200 feet, at the summit of Slide Mountain (Ulster County, New York) in the Catskills. The lowest elevation is 430' where the FLT crosses the Cayuga Inlet near Ithaca, NY. There are also five fire towers located along or near the trail. The first is the abandoned Mt. Tuscarora Fire Tower in Allegany State Park. The second is the Sugar Hill Fire Tower outside Watkins Glen State Park. The Berry Hill Fire Tower is located outside Bowman Lake State Park. The fourth is the Balsam Lake Mountain Fire Tower and the fifth is the Rock Rift Fire Tower.

As of January 1, 2022 the Finger Lakes Trail main trail has been completed 535 times (including continuous and section hikes). Joe Dabes ("Java Joe") has hiked the entire trail ten times. Frank Bianco's second of four hikes was completed in a continuous 24 days on June 26, 1997, when the trail was shorter than its current length. The six branch trails have all been completed 134 times as of Jan 1, 2022. On August 3, 2015, Heather Housekeeper ("Botanical Hiker") completed the first continuous hike of the main trail and all branch trails, in 62 days.

When using the trail, it is important to know whether the portion you are using is on private or public land and the rules applicable to that particular portion.

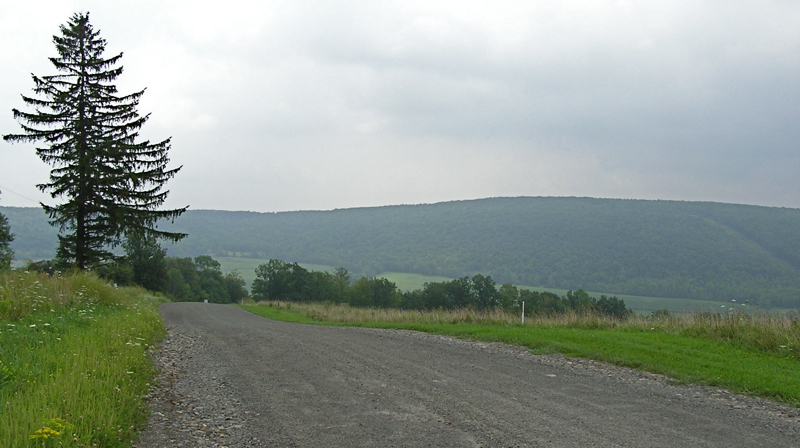
The Finger Lakes Trail in Howard, New York.

Those portions of the trail that pass over private lands are subject to rules established by the Finger Lakes Trail Conference ("FLTC") as negotiated with the private land owners. The portions of the trail that pass over public lands are subject to the laws and rules of the political entity that owns the public land.

For example, the portions of the trail that are in Allegany State Park are subject to the rules of the New York State Office of Parks, Recreation and Historic Preservation ("NYS OPRHP"). The portions of the trail that pass through New York State forests and New York State reforestation areas are subject to the rules of the New York State Department of Environmental Conservation ("NYS DEC"). The portions of the trail that pass over county owned lands are subject to the rules of the particular county.

This multi-jurisdiction can create a good deal of confusion. For example, there are some designated camping spots ("bivouac" areas and lean-tos) on both private and public lands. On private lands camping is allowed only in specifically designated locations. In some state parks camping is allowed anywhere on or near the trail that is not visible from a road. In other state parks, camping is allowed only in designated camping areas along the trail. On the portions of the trail that pass over New York State forests and New York State reforestation areas camping is anywhere that is at least 150 feet from any trail, road, and water source.

Likewise, mountain biking is generally prohibited by the FLTC. In state parks, mountain biking is allowed only if specifically designated by the NYS OPRHP. In state forest and reforestation areas, mountain biking is allowed unless the NYS DEC has specifically posted otherwise. Similar disparate rules apply to possession of firearms, both long guns and licensed handguns.

Portions of the trail that pass over private lands are closed during various hunting season (fall turkey season, fall big game season, and spring turkey season.) The portions of the trail that pass over public lands are generally open all year long including public lands on which hunting is allowed.

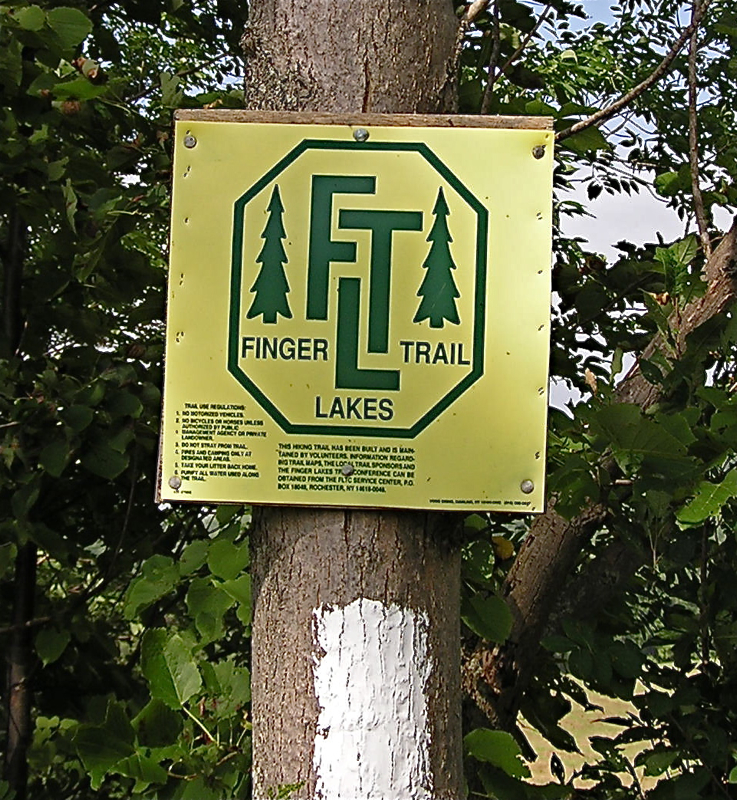
Finger Lakes Trail sign; the trail is marked with white blazes.

The FLTC sells detailed maps that specify the portions of the trail on public and private lands, and the portions of the trail that are closed during various hunting seasons.

== Branch trails ==
The following trails branch from the main trail:

- Conservation Trail - 183.0 miles (294.5 km) - Allegany State Park to Niagara Falls State Park (65 miles (105 km) overlaps FLT Main Trail). 0.9 miles (1.4 km) overlaps the Pat McGee Trail
- Letchworth Trail - 25.2 miles (40.6 km) - Letchworth State Park, Mt. Morris, NY to Portageville, NY (FLT Main Trail)
- Bristol Hills Trail - 54.2 miles (87.2 km) - Ontario County Park, Naples, NY to Mitchellsville, NY (FLT Main Trail)
- Crystal Hills Trail - 47.2 miles (76.0 km) - South Bradford, NY to Mid State Trail at PA border. Part of Great Eastern Trail
- Interloken Trail - 12.0 miles (19.3 km) - Finger Lakes National Forest, Hector, NY
- Onondaga Trail - 42.8 miles (68.9 km) - Cuyler, NY to Erieville, NY. Part of North Country National Scenic Trail
