= Harris Township, Pennsylvania =

Township in Pennsylvania, US

Coordinates: 40°47′00″N 77°45′59″W

- Township
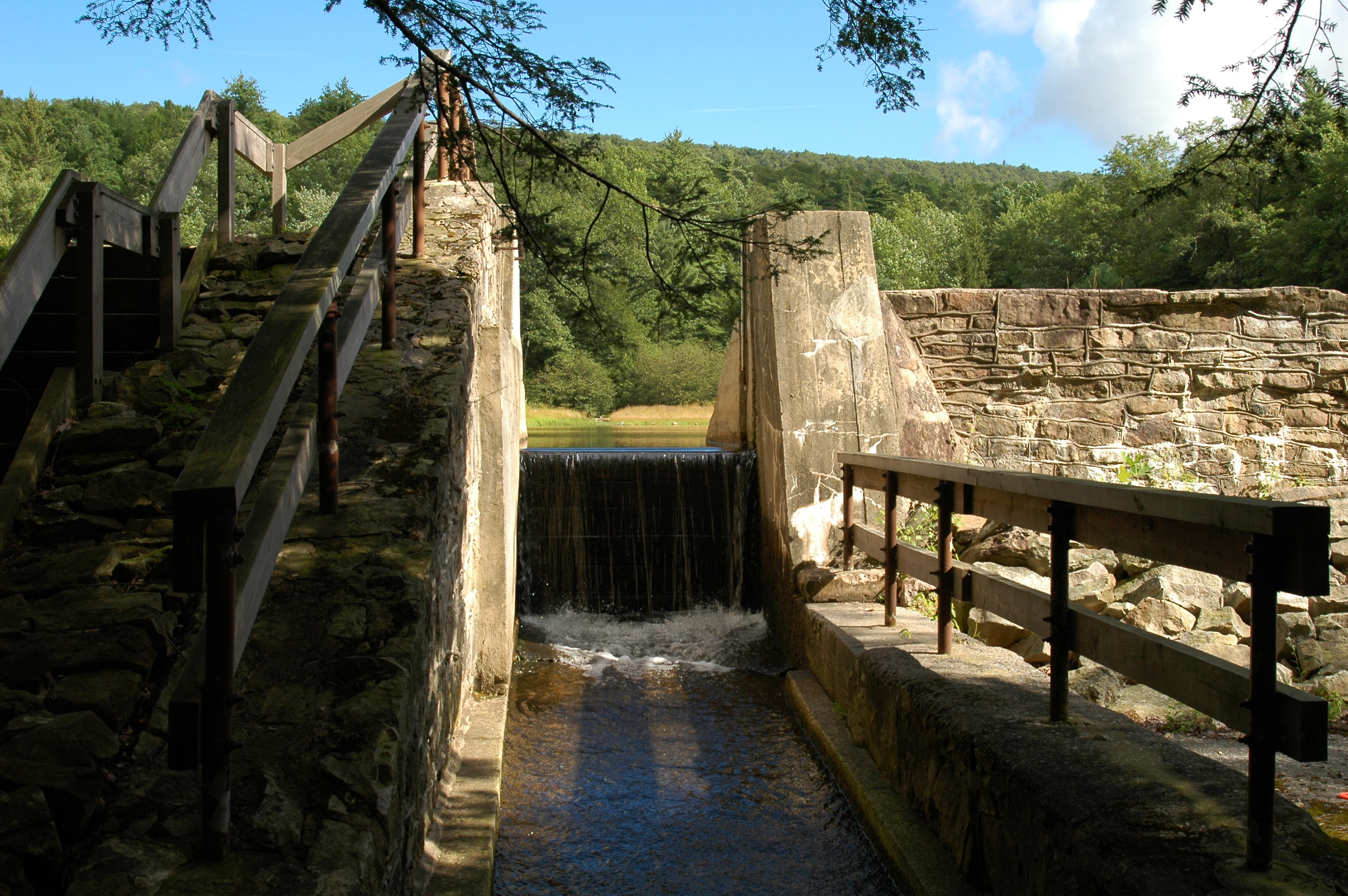
- Penn-Roosevelt State Park in Harris Township

- Logo

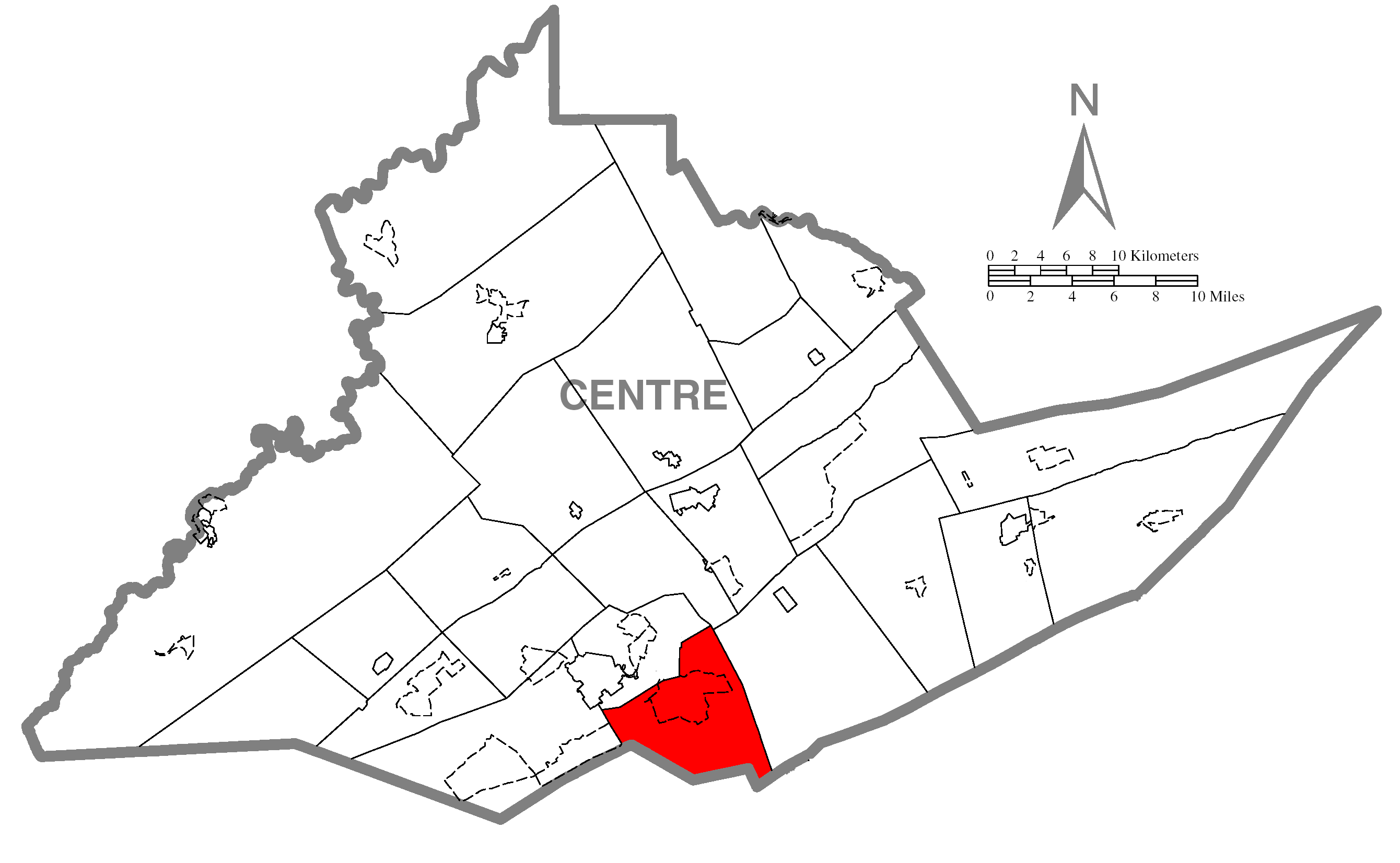
- Map of Centre County, Pennsylvania highlighting Harris Township

- Map of Centre County, Pennsylvania
- Country: United States
- State: Pennsylvania
- County: Centre
- Settled: 1802
- Incorporated: 1835

Government
  - Type: Board of Supervisors
  - Chairman: Dennis Hameister
  - Vice Chairman: Bruce Lord
  - Supervisor: Charles (Bud) Graham
  - Supervisor: Nigel Wilson
  - Supervisor: Frank Harden

Area
  - Total: 31.18 sq mi (80.75 km^{2})
  - Land: 31.17 sq mi (80.73 km^{2})
  - Water: 0.0077 sq mi (0.02 km^{2})

Population (2010)
  - Total: 4,873
  - Estimate (2016): 5,635
  - Density: 181/sq mi (69.8/km^{2})
- Time zone: EST
  - Summer (DST): EDT
- ZIP code: 16827
- Area code: 814
- FIPS code: 42-027-32792
- Website: www.harristownship.org

Harris Township is a township in Centre County, Pennsylvania, United States. It is part of the State College, Pennsylvania Metropolitan Statistical Area. Boalsburg, a census-designated place (CDP), is located within the township. The population was 4,873 at the 2010 census, which is a 4.6% increase since the 2000 census.

== History ==
Atlas of Harris Township and Boalsburg 1874

Harris Township was incorporated in 1835 from parts of Ferguson, Spring, and Potter townships. Harris was originally home to the Farmers' High School of Pennsylvania when it was founded in 1855. The communities of Lemont, Houserville, Oak Hall, and Rock Forges were all once part of Harris Township before College Township was established in 1875.

== Geography ==
According to the United States Census Bureau, the township has a total area of 31.2 square miles (80.8 km^{2}), all land.

Harris Township is bordered by Ferguson Township to the west, College Township to the north, Potter Township to the east and Huntingdon County to the south.

The Bear Meadows in the greater Rothrock State Forest is in Harris Township.

=== Neighborhoods ===
- Boalsburg (census-designated place)
- Linden Hall
- Panorama
- Shingletown

== Demographics ==
Historical population
Census	Pop.	Note	%±
2000	4,657		—
2010	4,873		4.6%
2020	5,913		21.3%

As of the census of 2010, there were 4,873 people, 1,985 households, and 1,433 families residing in the township. The population density was 152.8 inhabitants per square mile (59.0/km^{2}). There were 2,148 housing units at an average density of 67.3/sq mi (26.0/km^{2}). The racial makeup of the township was 94.2% White, 1.9% Black or African American, 0.1% Native American, 1.9% Asian, 0.4% from other races, and 1.5% from two or more races. Hispanic or Latino of any race were 1.7% of the population.

There were 1,985 households, out of which 30.4% had children under the age of 18 living with them, 60.6% were married couples living together, 3.5% had a male householder with no wife present, 8.2% had a female householder with no husband present, and 27.7% were non-families. 21.7% of all households were made up of individuals, and 7.5% had someone living alone who was 65 years of age or older. The average household size was 2.45 and the average family size was 2.86.

In the township the population was spread out, with 22.5% under the age of 18, 7.0% from 18 to 24, 20.9% from 25 to 44, 34.3% from 45 to 64, and 15.3% who were 65 years of age or older. The median age was 45 years. For every 100 females, there were 95.0 males. For every 100 females age 18 and over, there were 93.4 males.

The median income for a household in the township was $68,920, and the median income for a family was $75,380. The per capita income for the township was $37,835. About 3.5% of families and 5.1% of the population were below the poverty line, including 9.6% of those under age 18 and 3.4% of those age 65 or over.

== Transportation ==
The Centre Area Transportation Authority provides on-demand routes for Harris Township which connect to fixed routes in College, Ferguson, and Patton Township as well as the borough of State College.

=== Roads ===
Highways include:

- U.S. Route 322 Business
- U.S. Route 322
- Pennsylvania Route 45

== Public safety ==
Harris Township contracts police service from the State College Police Department. Boalsburg Fire Company provides fire and rescue services, while Centre Lifelink EMS is the primary ambulance service.
