= Standing Stone Trail =

Hiking trail in Pennsylvania

Coordinates: 40.614545°N 77.780739°W

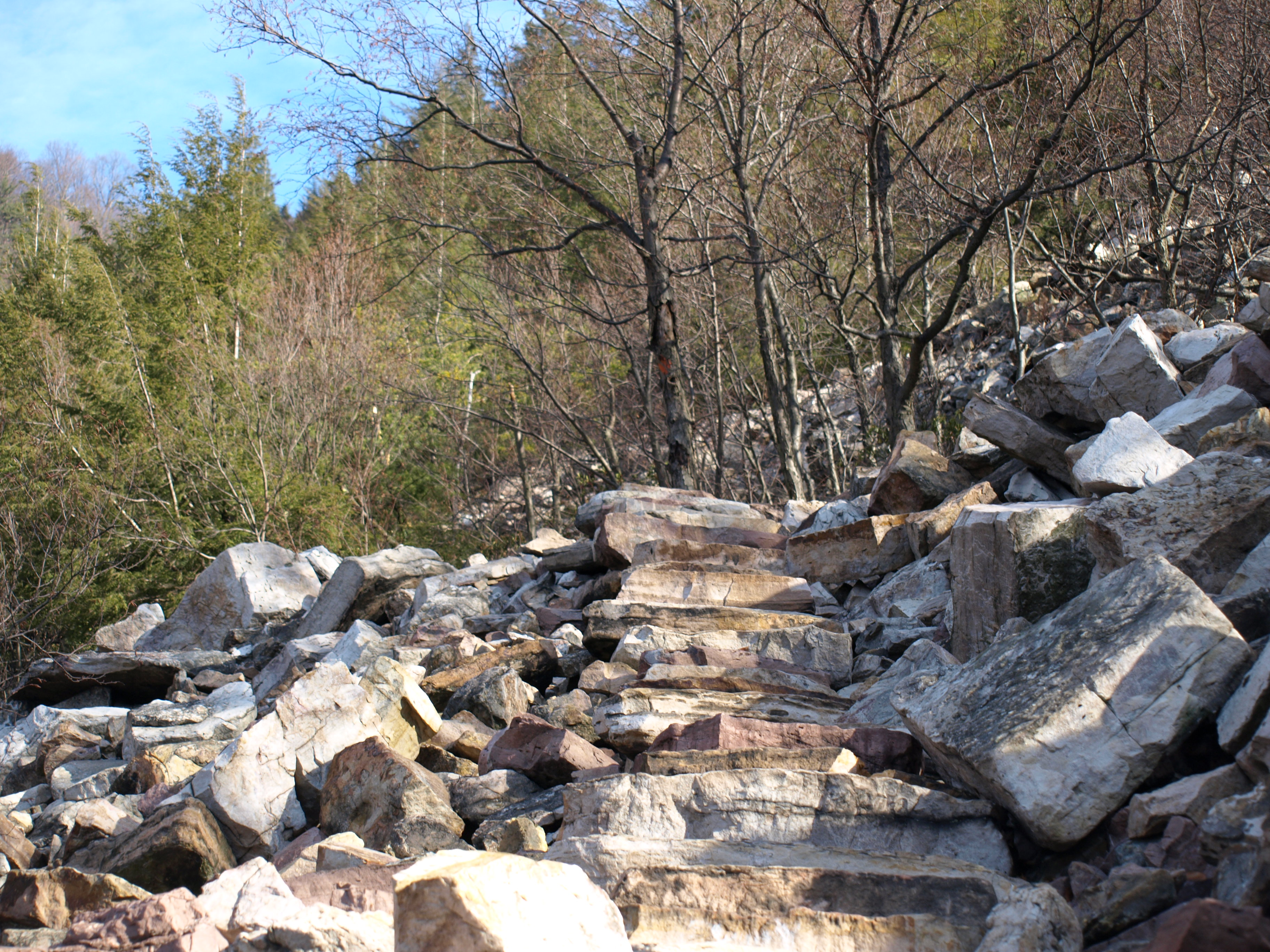
- The Thousand Steps landmark on the Standing Stone Trail
- Length: 84.2 mi (135.5 km)
- Location: Fulton County, Mifflin County, and Huntingdon County, Pennsylvania, US
- Trailheads: South: Tuscarora Trail at Cowans Gap State Park; North: Detweiler Run Natural Area in Rothrock State Forest
- Use: Hiking
- Difficulty: Moderate to strenuous
- Season: Year-round
- Hazards: Uneven and wet terrain, rattlesnakes, mosquitoes, ticks, black bears

The Standing Stone Trail is an 84.2-mile (135.5 km) linear hiking trail in south-central Pennsylvania, leading from Cowans Gap State Park in Fulton County, north to Detweiler Run Natural Area in Huntingdon County. Most of the trail follows rocky ridgetops in the Appalachian Mountains, with some walking through agricultural valleys and small towns, and it also passes through various segments of Rothrock State Forest and four different State Game Lands. It was constructed to connect the Tuscarora Trail and Mid State Trail, and it is a component of the Great Eastern Trail network.

== History ==
The trail was constructed in the late 1970s, and was originally named the Link Trail due to its goal of connecting the Tuscarora Trail in southern Pennsylvania with the Mid State Trail in the center of the state. The trail originally led from Cowans Gap State Park to Greenwood Furnace State Park, at which point the interested hiker would continue on the pre-existing Greenwood Spur Trail for about another seven miles to a junction with the Mid State Trail. The trail was renamed as the Standing Stone Trail in 2007, as a tribute to a tradition among the region's Native Americans to record genealogies on a "standing stone" in each village. In the late 2010s, state forestry officials allowed the former Greenwood Spur to be added to the Standing Stone Trail, allowing it to reach the Mid State Trail and extending its total length to 84.2 miles. The Standing Stone Trail was named trail of the year by the Pennsylvania Department of Conservation and Natural Resources in 2016.

== Route ==
The route of the Standing Stone Trail is described here from south to north. The trail begins at a junction with the Tuscarora Trail near the dam and artificial lake at Cowans Gap State Park. The Standing Stone Trail briefly heads to the south through the state park, but then turns north and climbs to the top of Cove Mountain. At 2.4 miles it exits the state park and enters the first of several discontiguous segments of Rothrock State Forest. Along the top of the ridge formed by Cove Mountain, there are some small parcels of private land where hiking is prohibited during Pennsylvania's deer hunting season. After descending off the mountain, the trail passes through a rugged hollow called "The Narrows" at 7.5 miles, then at 8.5 miles encounters an old grade remaining from an uncompleted cross-Pennsylvania railroad attempted by William Henry Vanderbilt in the 1880s, locally known as "Vanderbilt's Folly".

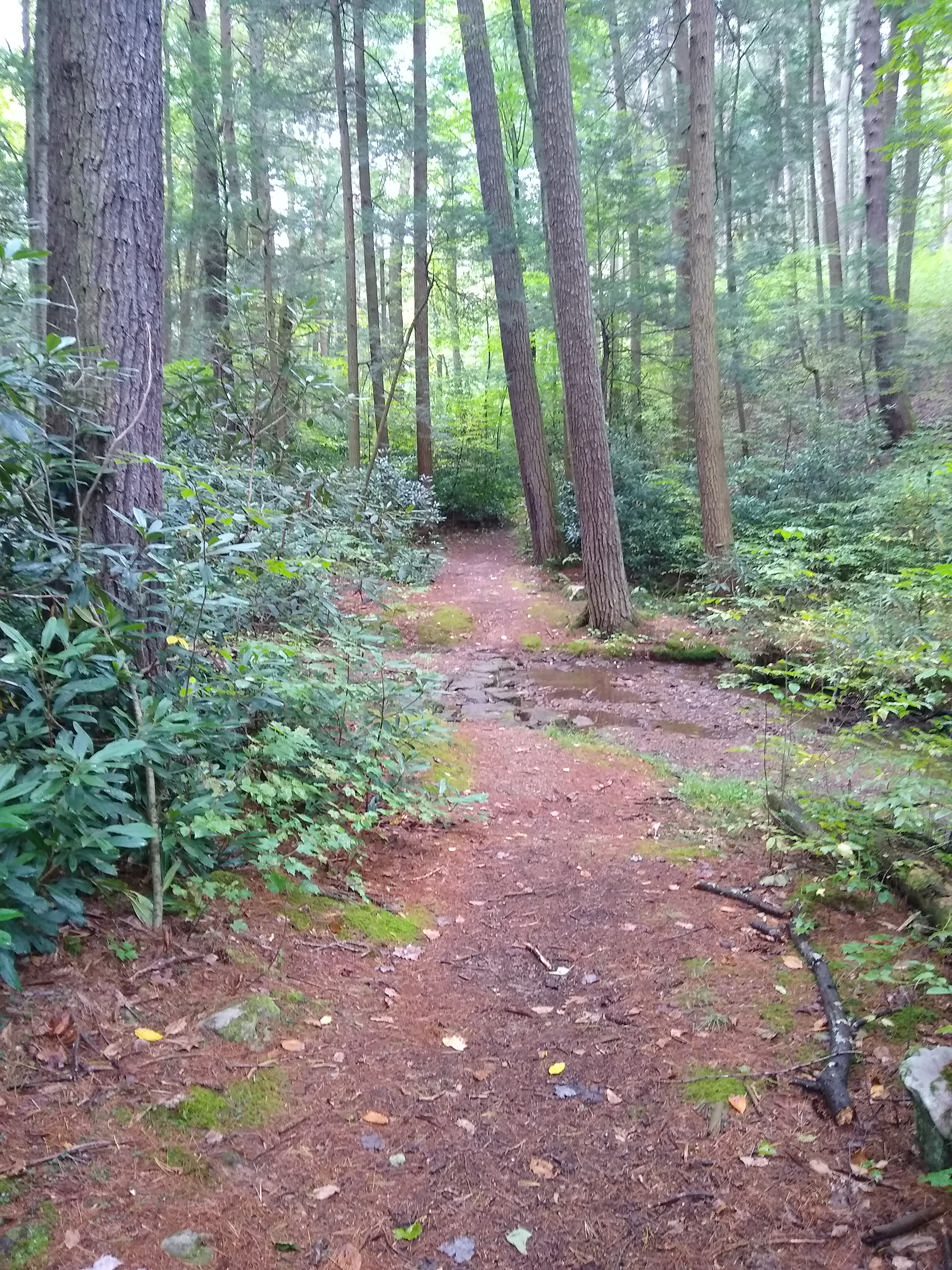
The Standing Stone Trail at Alan Seeger Natural Area

At 10.0 miles the trail walks briefly along US Route 522 near the village of Burnt Cabins, then continues north through some farm fields. After a crossing of Little Aughwick Creek, the trail enters State Game Lands 81 and begins a lengthy climb to the top of Blacklog Mountain. The trail follows the top of this ridge for about the next nine miles, and then descends into an agricultural valley. At 19.8 miles the trail follows PA Route 475 for a short distance through the village of Meadow Gap, then follows paved residential roads to the west, including a road bridge over Aughwick Creek, until turning onto PA Route 994 and walking through the village of Three Springs at 24.7 miles. The trail then turns back to the north and enters State Game Lands 99, climbing to the top of Jacks Mountain for another lengthy ridgetop walk. At 33.7 miles the trail reaches Butler Knob shelter, followed about one mile later by a fire tower. At 36.3 miles the trail reaches a talus slope with a vista called Hall of the Mountain King, followed by a side trail that leads briefly to another talus slope and vista called the Throne Room. The trail then enters State Game Lands 71 and descends off of Jacks Mountain, walking through the village of Mapleton. At 46.1 miles, in the center of Mapleton, the trail briefly joins PA Route 655 and uses the road bridge over the Juniata River.

The trail crosses US Route 22 at 46.8 miles then follows an old railroad grade parallel to the highway, entering State Game Lands 112. At 48.3 miles it reaches the bottom of the Thousand Steps, a stairway built by hand from nearby rocks by railroad workers in 1936. The steps were built as a shortcut for workers to reach several different segments of a switchbacking industrial railroad that served rock quarries on the side of Jacks Mountain, above a sharp gap that had been cut by the Juniata River, and there are actually more than 1,100 steps in all. A climb up and down the Thousand Steps is popular with the area's fitness enthusiasts, and has been noted as one of Pennsylvania's more unique hiking options.

After the top of the steps, the trail continues rising to the top of Jacks Mountain once again, and stays on the rocky ridgetop for about the next seven miles. After a steep descent off the mountain, the trail crosses PA Route 655 again and begins a lengthy, multi-step climb to the top of Stone Mountain. At 65.0 miles the trail enters the largest swath of Rothrock State Forest, and will remain in this tract for most of the rest of its distance. Just after the boundary, the trail passes briefly through Rocky Ridge Natural Area, and at 69.1 miles it passes a locally popular hawkwatching platform. The expansive Big Valley Vista, toward the town of Belleville, is reached at 73.8 miles, followed by a descent off of Stone Mountain. The trail crosses PA Route 305 and enters Greenwood Furnace State Park at 77.6 miles. It then re-enters Rothrock State Forest, joining the former Greenwood Spur Trail, and climbs to the top of Broad Mountain. After a walk across the top of this mountain and an encounter with a defunct fire tower, the trail descends and enters Alan Seeger Natural Area at 82.2 miles. The trail then continues to the north, reaching Detweiler Run Natural Area and ending at a junction with the Mid State Trail at 84.2 miles.
