= Tuscarora Trail =

Long distance eastern U.S. hiking trail

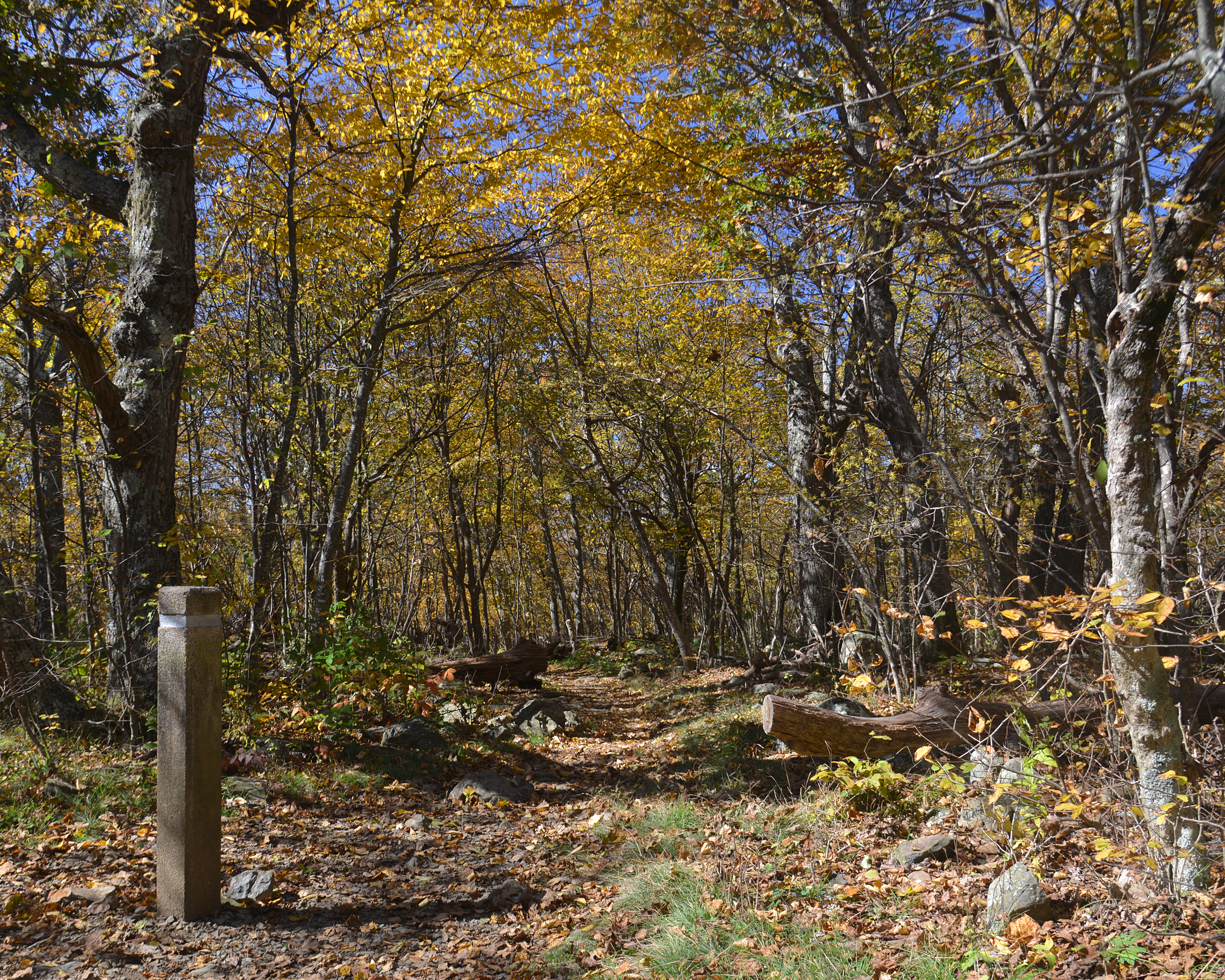
- The southern terminus of the Tuscarora Trail at Shenandoah National Park.
- Length: 252 mi (406 km)
- Location: Eastern United States
- Trailheads: South: Appalachian Trail in Shenandoah National Park in Virginia; 38°17′34″N 78°40′45″W; North: Appalachian Trail near Harrisburg, Pennsylvania; 40°17′39.9″N 77°5′26.9″W
- Use: Hiking
- Highest point: Southern trailhead, Shenandoah National Park, 3,440 ft (1,050 m)
- Lowest point: Potomac River, C&O Canal National Historical Park, 380 ft (120 m)
- Difficulty: Strenuous
- Hazards: Severe weather, uneven and wet terrain, rattlesnakes, mosquitoes, ticks, black bears
- Website: hikethetuscarora.org

The Tuscarora Trail is a 252-mile (406 km) hiking trail in the eastern United States, following the Appalachian Mountains through portions of Virginia, West Virginia, Maryland, and Pennsylvania. Its route is roughly parallel to, and to the west of, the Appalachian Trail.

== History ==
The Tuscarora Trail was originally conceived as an alternate route for the Appalachian Trail, which had been built in the 1920s-30s. By the 1960s, and before it was protected as a National Scenic Trail, a number of segments of the Appalachian Trail were being encroached upon and sometimes closed by private and commercial landowners. To ensure the trail's continuity, the Appalachian Trail Conference began to consider alternate routes that could be used to bypass those threatened segments of the AT, with the goal of avoiding high-demand areas and maximizing public land usage.

The alternate route was originally built in the late 1960s as two separate trails: the 142-mile Big Blue Trail in Virginia and West Virginia, and the 110-mile Tuscarora Trail in Maryland and Pennsylvania, which were separated by an unofficial crossing of the Potomac River. By 1997, a crossing of the river via a road bridge had been approved, and the two trails were combined to form a continuous 252-mile route known as the Tuscarora Trail, because it largely traverses ridgetops above the Tuscarora Sandstone formation.

During the 1980s, several segments of the Tuscarora Trail in Pennsylvania had to be closed due to damage from gypsy moth infestations. After several years of rehabilitation, those segments were reopened. In the early 2000s, the Tuscarora Trail was named as a component of the Great Eastern Trail, which will extend for more than 2,000 miles from Florida to New York. A loop consisting of the Tuscarora Trail and the Appalachian Trail between their two junctions has been dubbed the Tuscalachian Loop, which is 435 miles in length.

== Route ==
The southern terminus of the Tuscarora Trail is at a junction with the Appalachian Trail in Shenandoah National Park in Virginia, on top of Blue Ridge. Traveling northbound, the Tuscarora Trail diverges from the AT to the northwest and traverses Massanutten Mountain and Great North Mountain through Virginia for about its first 106 miles. North of the town of Siler, the trail passes into West Virginia and for about the next 37 miles crosses that state's Eastern Panhandle region. The trail crosses the Potomac River via the road bridge for US Route 522, and enters Maryland at Hancock.

The trail then shares its route with the C&O Canal Towpath for about eight miles, then heads north for about six additional miles in Maryland. It then crosses the Mason Dixon Line and spends the next 95 miles in Pennsylvania, traversing Tuscarora Mountain then Blue Mountain. The northern terminus of the Tuscarora Trail is at another junction with the Appalachian Trail, plus the Darlington Trail, on Blue Mountain about 10 miles north of Harrisburg.

For planning purposes, the Tuscarora Trail is divided into 22 sections, ranging from 6 to 18 miles in length, with section names displayed prominently in guidebooks and on some trail signs.

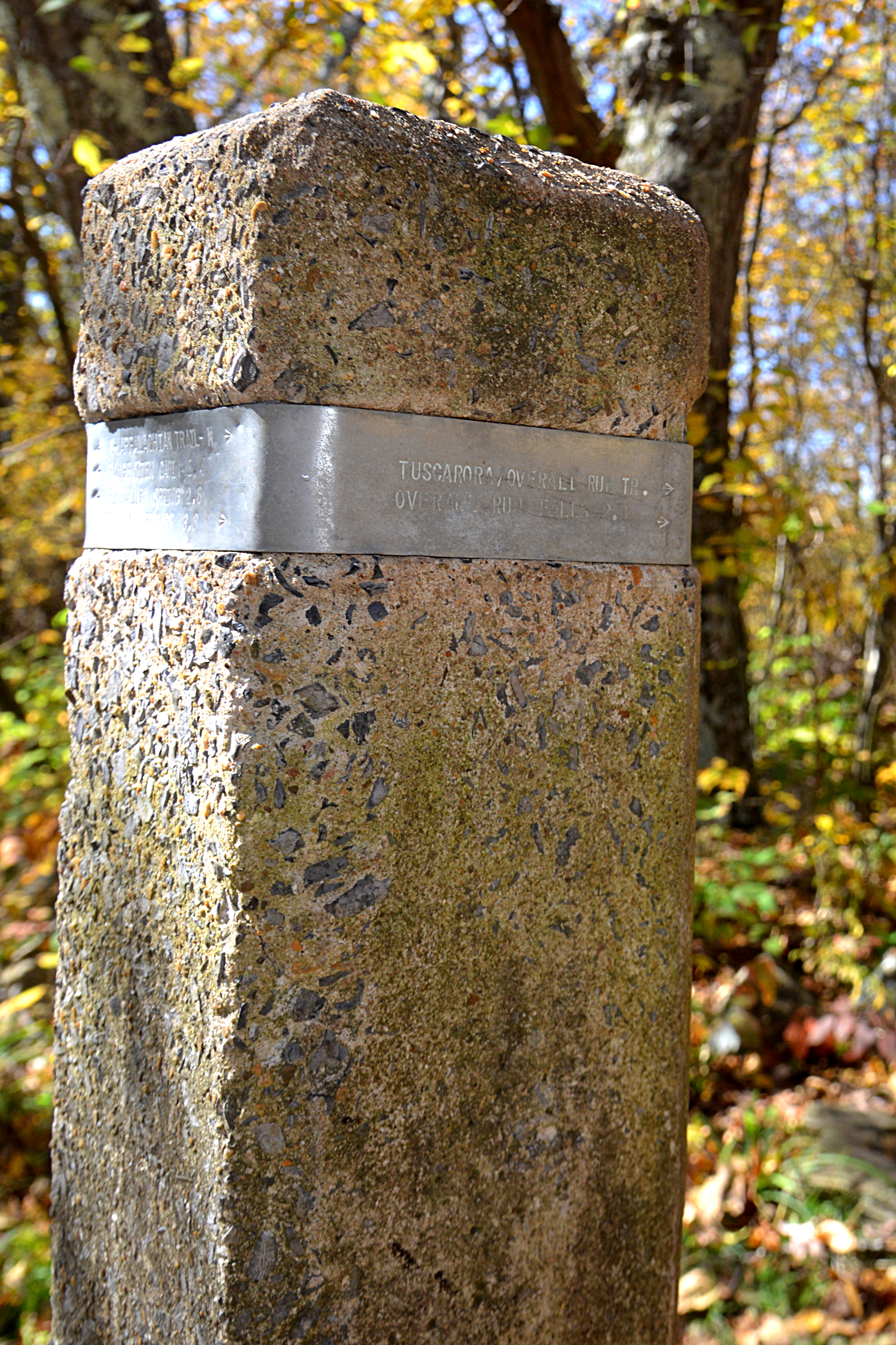
A stone marker at the southern terminus of the Tuscarora Trail.
