= Bear Meadows Natural Area =

Protected area in Pennsylvania, United States

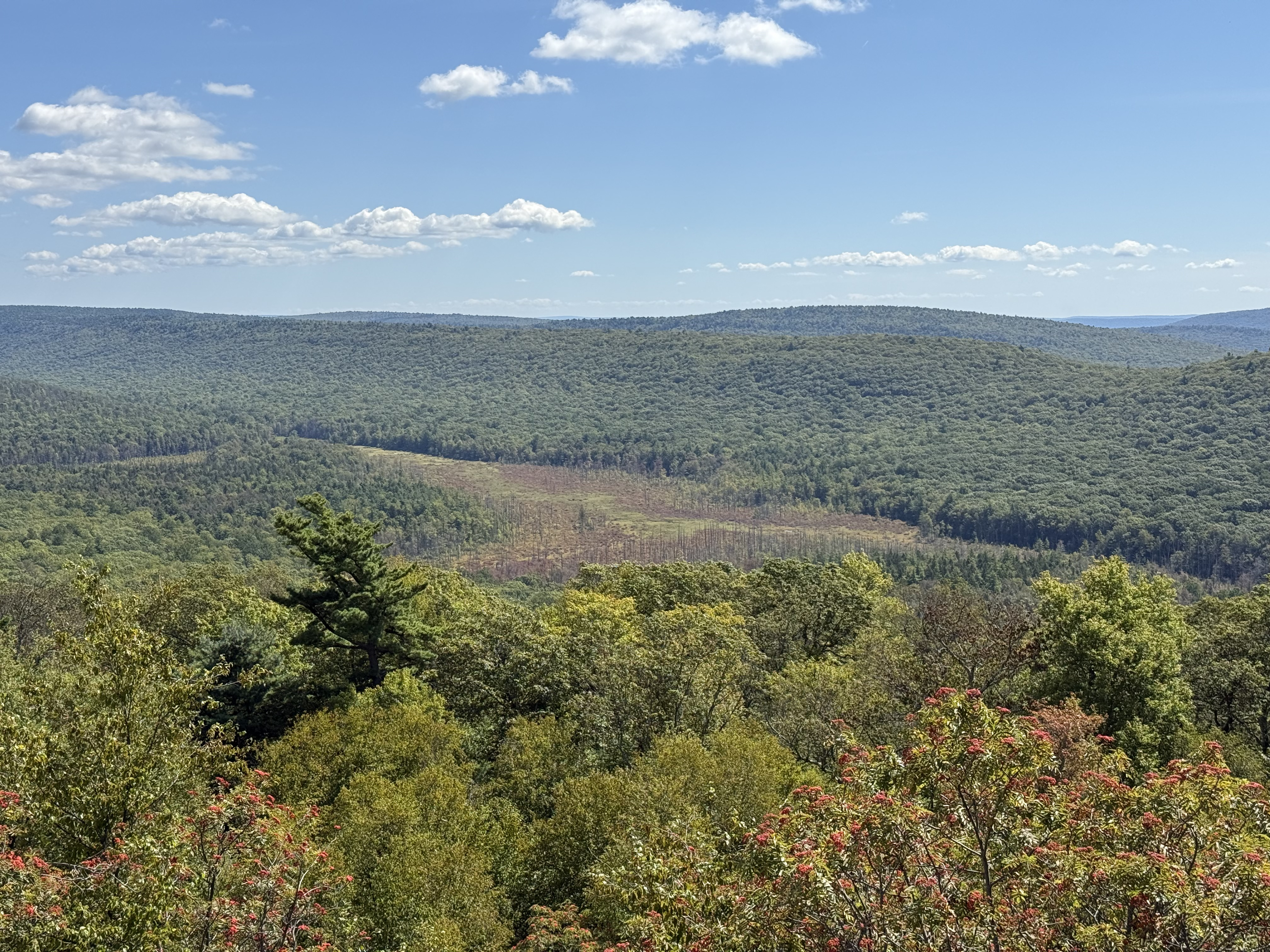
- View of Bear Meadows from the Mid State Trail

- Location within Pennsylvania
- Location: Harris Township, Centre County, Pennsylvania
- Nearest town: Boalsburg
- Coordinates: 40°43′45″N 77°45′50″W
- Area: 890 acres (360 ha)
- Established: 1965

U.S. National Natural Landmark
- Designated: 1965

Bear Meadows Natural Area is a National Natural Landmark located within Rothrock State Forest in Harris Township, Centre County, Pennsylvania, United States, four miles south of Boalsburg, in the Appalachian Mountains. The area can be accessed via a loop hiking trail, while it is visible from several ridgetop vistas reached via the Mid State Trail. It is surrounded by Thickhead Mountain Wild Area.

== Description ==
Bear Meadows Natural Area was founded in 1965 as a State Forest Natural Area, and has since been expanded to 890 acres. The area contains a bog surrounded by steep mountains, in an enclosed valley that has been poorly drained for thousands of years. The bog creates a swampy landscape that is unusual for central Pennsylvania, and it is known for providing a habitat for rare plants and insects.

Large amounts of peat have formed at the bottom of the bog. This peat has attracted scientific interest because it preserves spores from plants and trees that have occupied the area for the past 10,000 years. The spores indicate that the area once included species now found only in Siberia and northern Canada, which can in turn be used to study long-term climate changes.

The bog has been forming since the end of the last glacial period 10,000 years ago and is surrounded by an old-growth forest of boreal species typically found much farther north, such as black spruce, balsam fir, eastern hemlock, and yellow birch.

== Geology ==
The bog itself is underlain by the Juniata Formation. The U-shaped ridge to the north, west, and south is formed by the Tuscarora Formation. The low hill to the northeast of the bog is formed by the Bald Eagle Formation. Periglacial boulders are abundant on the slopes surrounding the bog.
