= Donut Hole Trail =

Hiking trail in Pennsylvania

Coordinates: 41.3044°N 77.8064°W

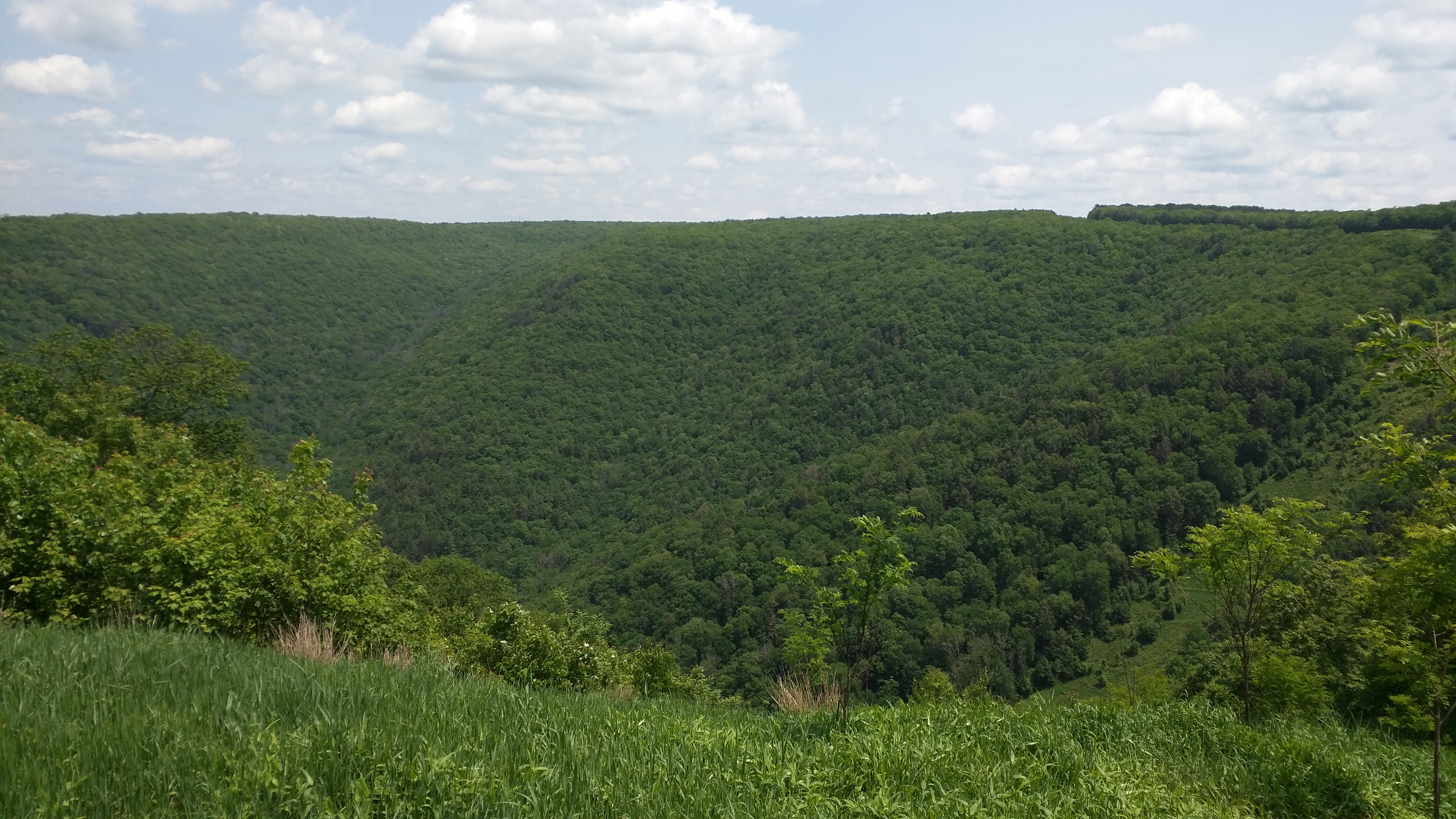
- A vista seen from the Donut Hole Trail, south of Hyner Run State Park.
- Length: 94.2 mi (151.6 km)
- Location: Clinton County and Cameron County, Pennsylvania, US
- Trailheads: Jericho, Pennsylvania and Farrandsville, Pennsylvania
- Use: Hiking
- Elevation change: Very high
- Difficulty: Strenuous
- Season: Year-round
- Hazards: Uneven and wet terrain, rattlesnakes, mosquitoes, ticks, black bears

The Donut Hole Trail is a 94.2-mile (151.6 km) hiking trail in north-central Pennsylvania, through Sproul State Forest and roughly parallel to the West Branch Susquehanna River. Most of the trail is in Clinton County, with a short segment at its western end in Cameron County. The Donut Hole Trail is regarded as one of the most challenging and remote backpacking trails in Pennsylvania, encountering just six paved roads along its entire length and featuring many difficult climbs and creek crossings.

== History ==
Construction of the Donut Hole Trail began in the mid-1970s, and the trail was intended as a long-distance backpacking route through the more remote areas of Sproul State Forest. The original version of the trail began at Kettle Creek State Park and traveled northeast to a junction with the Susquehannock Trail System, with the two trails sharing a common path for several miles. After the two trails separated, the Donut Hole Trail headed southeast and ended at Hyner Run State Park. In the 1980s the trail was extended to both the west and east, eventually reaching its western terminus at Jericho in Cameron County and its eastern terminus near Farrandsville in Clinton County. From Jericho, less than two miles of road walking can lead hikers to the Old Sinnemahoning Trail, which in turn leads to the Quehanna Trail.

By the late 1980s the Donut Hole Trail was about 89 miles long. In 2015, the trail was rerouted extensively to the south of Hyner Run State Park in order to visit more scenic and secluded areas. This added several miles to the official route and the trail is now 94.2 miles long.

The origin of the trail's name is a matter of some speculation. According to reliable sources, the original segment of the trail was built by workers from a federal jobs program who had been brought in from large cities and did not enjoy this remote area of Pennsylvania. Apparently, these workers gave the area and the trail an unflattering nickname containing the word Hole, which forestry officials converted to Donut Hole to symbolize a remote forested territory that is surrounded by urbanity.

== Route ==
The western terminus of the Donut Hole Trail is at the corner of Pennsylvania Route 120 and Jericho Road in the village of Jericho, which in turn is a short distance east of a junction with Pennsylvania Route 872. The trail begins at a relatively low elevation near Sinnemahoning Creek but quickly climbs to the top of the Allegheny Plateau, gaining about 1,500 feet of elevation in about the first four miles. At 5.3 miles, the trail exits Cameron County and remains in Clinton County for the rest of its distance. At 7.2 miles the trail descends into a vast system of hollows formed by Cooks Run and its tributaries, then climbs back to the top of the plateau and visits a significant vista over Kettle Creek at 11.9 miles. The trail then descends into that creek's canyon.

At 14.3 miles, the hiker reaches a recent relocation, where a former route of the Donut Hole Trail departs to the south and heads to a wet, bridgeless crossing of the wide Kettle Creek. For safety reasons, in the 2010s the official route of the Donut Hole Trail was moved onto an old side trail that heads north along the creek, after which the hiker heads south on the paved road through Kettle Creek State Park. This added seven-tenths of a mile to the Donut Hole Trail's total length.

After departing Kettle Creek State Park, the trail trends northeast and climbs vigorously to the top of the Allegheny Plateau again, traversing an area with many vistas. The trail jogs briefly on Pennsylvania Route 144 at 26.6 miles, and reaches a prominent footbridge over Paddy Run at 32.3 miles. This is followed by an incongruous wetland complex, and then a descent to Shingle Branch at 36.0 miles. The Donut Hole Trail crosses this wide creek without bridges four times then reaches a junction with the Susquehannock Trail System (STS) at 37.1 miles. The two trails are concurrent for the next 8.6 miles. The hiker passes a shelter (associated with the STS) at 38.9 miles, followed by a walk along Greenlick Run and then a significant descent to the Left Branch of Young Womans Creek at 44.5 miles, using a high footbridge called Ted's Truss in honor of a state forester. The hiker then climbs very steeply up Morgan Hollow, and the Donut Hole Trail and STS split at 45.7 miles, at Fork Hill Road.

The STS departs to the north while the Donut Hole Trail heads south and crosses the Right Branch of Young Womans Creek at 49.2 miles, on a road bridge and near a historical monument to Pennsylvania forestry practices. The trail rises to the top of the plateau again, and begins a walk along Cougar Run at 53.0 miles. Reach a junction with the T-Squared Trail at 53.7 miles; that trail heads north to the Black Forest Trail. Now trending south, the Donut Hole Trail traverses several very steep climbs and descents through sharp gorges in the plateau, and reaches Hyner Run State Park at 58.8 miles.

The Donut Hole Trail formerly turned east here, but in 2015 it was extensively rerouted onto the pre-existing Jack Paulhamus/Garby Trail (JPG), with the two trails concurrent for the next 5.3 miles. This was done so the Donut Hole Trail could visit more scenic areas while avoiding fracking pressures to the east of Hyner Run State Park. South of the park, the trail climbs very vigorously to the top of the plateau again, with several more significant vistas. The JPG splits off at 64.0 miles (it eventually connects with the Chuck Keiper Trail), and the Donut Hole Trail continues uphill to Hyner View State Park at 65.1 miles. The trail then descends very steeply into the canyon formed by the West Branch Susquehanna River, and at 68.5 miles enters lands managed by the Pennsylvania branch of The Nature Conservancy as a wildlife sanctuary and forestry research district. The organization agreed to allow the Donut Hole Trail to pass through this parcel, though no camping is allowed for 8.1 miles. The trail is very remote and difficult in this area, with no road access (for ordinary vehicles) for nearly 16 miles.

After climbing with great difficulty through the Nature Conservancy parcel, the trail again descends steeply and reaches near the level of the West Branch Susquehanna River, then follows an unpaved road through the ghost town of Whetham at 80.9 miles. The trail then climbs to the top of the plateau yet again, and then descends through State Game Lands 89 starting at 90.7 miles. At 94.2 miles, the Donut Hole Trail ends on a forestry road, near Lick Run and the remains of a Civilian Conservation Corps camp, a short distance north of Farrandsville.
