= List of Pennsylvania Scenic Byways =

Pennsylvania Scenic Byways

System information
- Formed: 2001

Highway names
- Interstates: Interstate X (I-X)
- US Highways: U.S. Route X (US X)
- State: Pennsylvania Route X (PA X)

System links
- Pennsylvania State Route System; Interstate; US; State; Scenic; Legislative

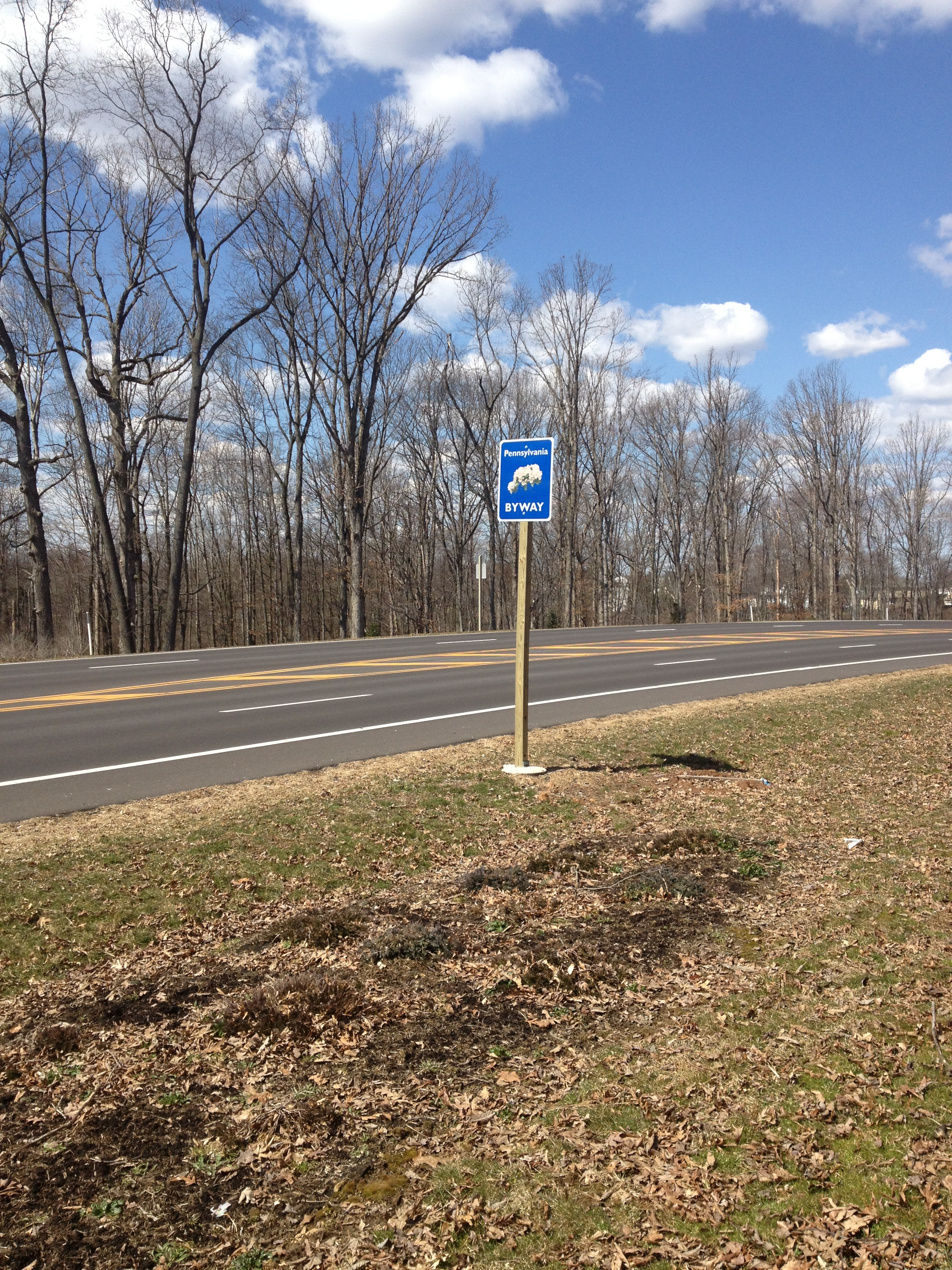
Pennsylvania Byway marker along the US 202 Parkway

The Pennsylvania Scenic Byways system consists of 21 roads recognized for their scenic or historic qualities.

== History ==
In 1991, the National Scenic Byways Program was created by the Intermodal Surface Transportation Efficiency Act, in which roads that were designated state scenic byways could be designated a National Scenic Byway. In the early 1990s, Pennsylvania used federal funding to create the Pennsylvania Scenic Byways program. The state underwent a State Scenic Byways study, with four byways created by the Pennsylvania State Legislature. In 2001, the Pennsylvania Department of Transportation's Program Management Committee created a scenic byway program. The first byway to be designated under this program was the Kinzua Scenic Byway in McKean County.

== Byways ==
=== Blue Route ===
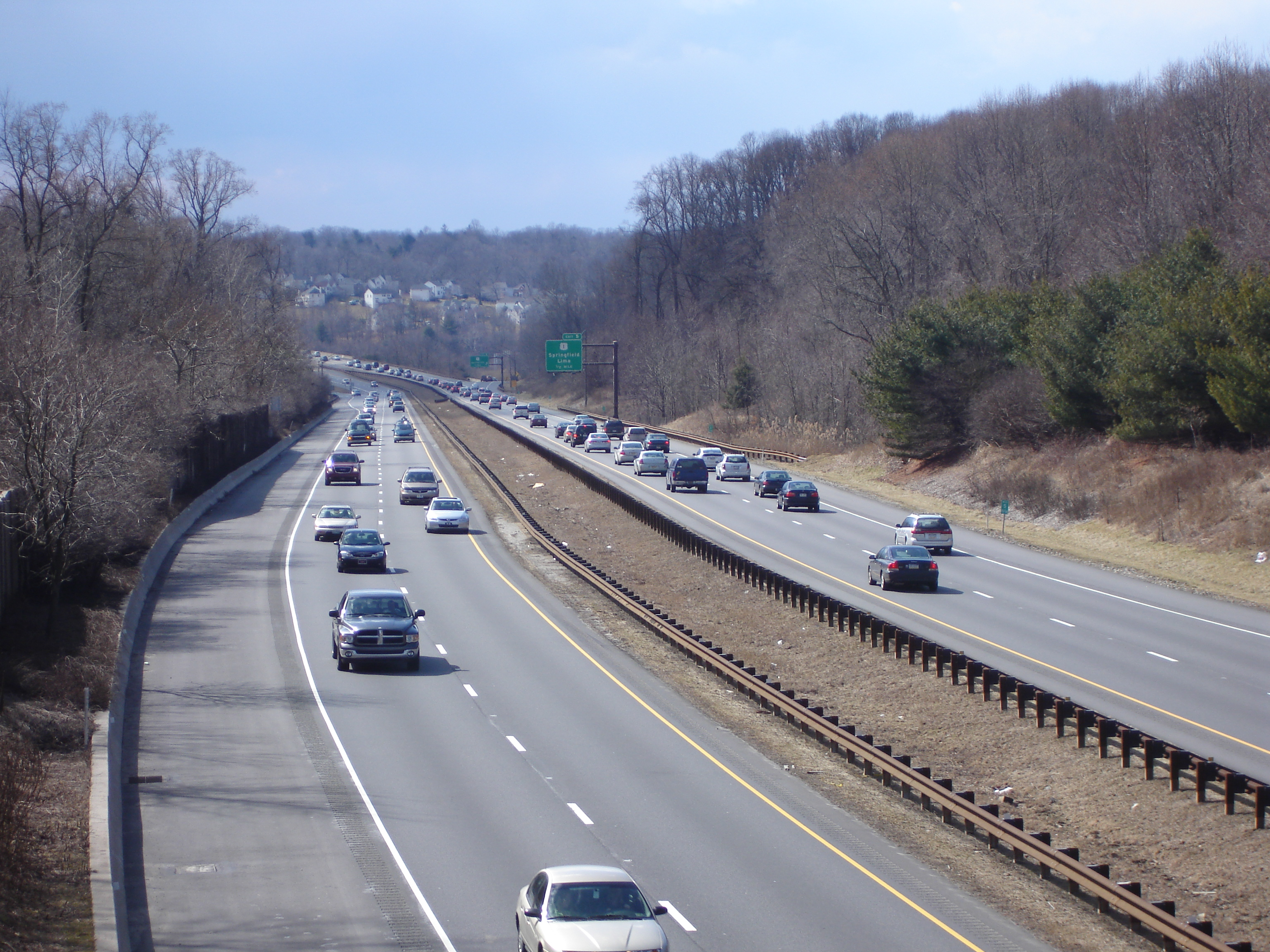
The Blue Route north of US 1.

The Blue Route Scenic Byway follows I-476 between I-95 in Chester, Delaware County and the Pennsylvania Turnpike (I-276) in Plymouth Meeting, Montgomery County. The byway provides access to many sites in and near the Brandywine Valley in Delaware County including Ridley Creek State Park, Media Theatre, the Brandywine River Museum, Tyler Arboretum, and the Pennsylvania Veterans Museum.

=== Brandywine Valley ===
The Brandywine Valley Scenic Byway follows PA 52, former PA 100, and PA 162 in Chester and Delaware counties. The byway runs through the countryside of the Brandywine Valley, providing access to attractions such as Longwood Gardens and the Brandywine River Museum.

=== Bucktail Trail ===
The Bucktail Trail Scenic Byway runs along PA 120 from Ridgway, Elk County east to Lock Haven, Clinton County. The byway passes through forested areas of the Pennsylvania Wilds, passing through St. Marys and serving Kettle Creek State Park.

=== Conestoga Ridge ===
The Conestoga Ridge Byway runs along PA 23 between US 322 in Blue Ball and PA 10 west of Morgantown, passing through farmland in Lancaster County along with the communities of Goodville and Churchtown. The byway was designated in 2013.

=== Crawford Lakelands ===
The Crawford Lakelands Scenic Byway runs from Jamestown to Linesville in Crawford County, following PA 285, PA 618, PA 18, and US 6. The byway runs through rural areas, serving Conneaut Lake Park and Pymatuning State Park.

=== Delaware River Valley ===
The Delaware River Valley Scenic Byway runs from Easton to Riverton in Northampton County, following PA 611, Little Creek Road, and Belvidere Highway. The byway runs through rural areas of farmland along the west bank of the Delaware River.

=== Exton Bypass ===
The Exton Bypass Scenic Byway follows the Exton Bypass portion of US 30 bypassing Exton in Chester County. The byway is located near the historic Lincoln Highway and is near points of interest including the QVC Studio Tour, the American Helicopter Museum, and Fox Leap Vineyards.

=== Gateway to the Endless Mountains ===
The Gateway to the Endless Mountains Scenic Byway runs along US 6 in Tunkhannock, Wyoming County. The byway is in the Endless Mountains region and provides access to various sites including the Dietrich Theater in Tunkhannock and the Bird Song Winery in Dushore, Sullivan County.

=== Governor Casey ===
The Governor Casey Scenic Byway runs along the US 6 freeway in Lackawanna County between I-81 in Dunmore and PA 247 in Jessup. The byway provides access to historical sites including Steamtown National Historic Site, the Pennsylvania Anthracite Heritage Museum, and the Lackawanna Coal Mine.

=== Grand View ===
The Grand View Scenic Byway runs along Grandview Avenue, McArdle Roadway, and Sycamore Street in Pittsburgh, Allegheny County. The byway features views of downtown Pittsburgh and provides access to sites such as the Monongahela Incline, the Duquesne Incline, and the Mount Washington overlook.

=== High Plateau ===
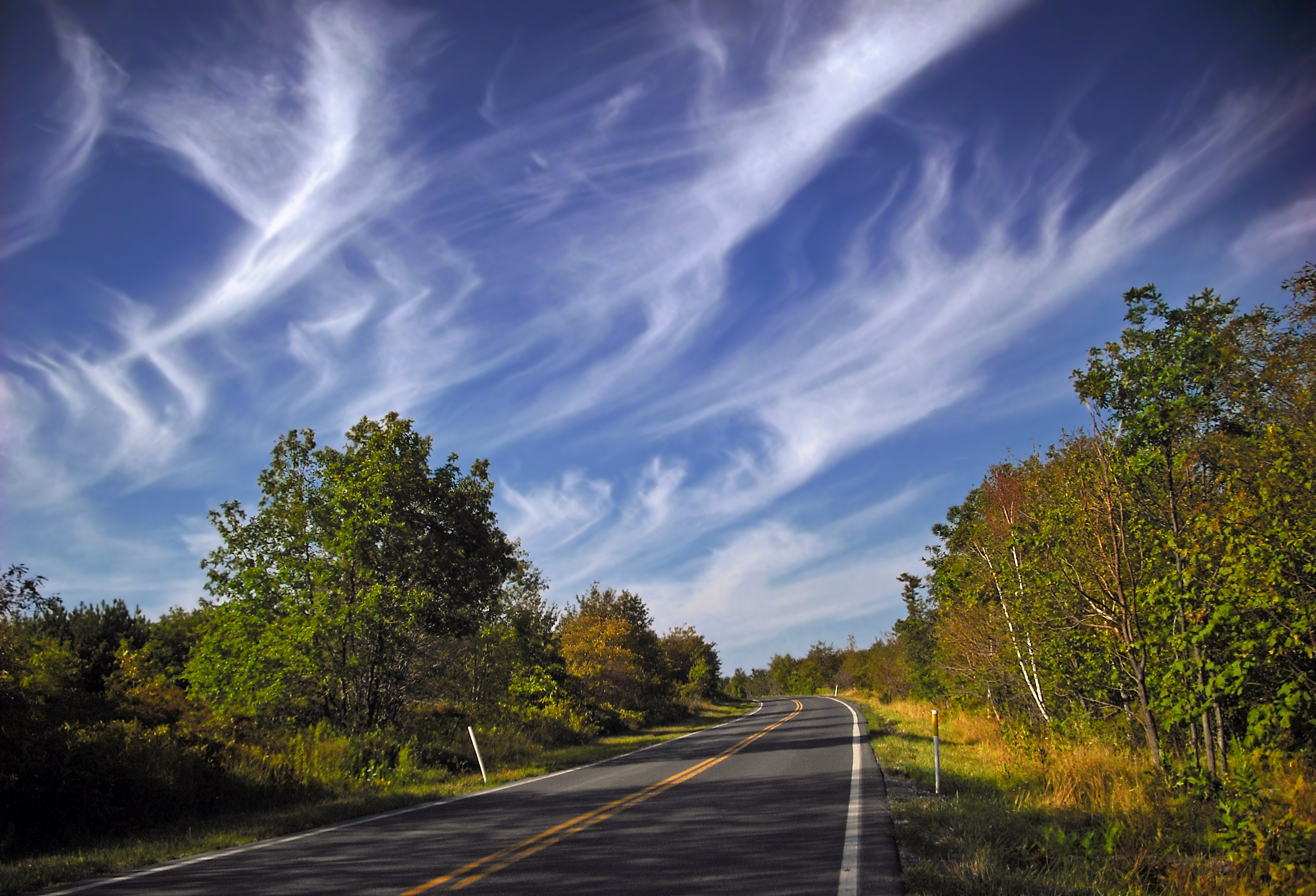
High Plateau Scenic Byway along PA 144 in Noyes Township, Clinton County

The High Plateau Scenic Byway follows PA 144 between Snow Shoe, Centre County and Renovo, Clinton County. The byway runs through the Sproul State Forest and serves sites such as the Two Run Rock Vista, Fish Dam Run Scenic View, Chuck Keiper Trail, Cranberry Swamp Natural Area, and St. Severin's Old Log Church.

=== Journey Through Hallowed Ground ===
The Journey Through Hallowed Ground Scenic Byway runs along US 15 and US 15 Bus. from the Maryland border to Hunterstown in Adams County. The byway passes through Gettysburg, a historic town where Gettysburg National Military Park is located. The Journey Through Hallowed Ground Scenic Byway is part of a National Scenic Byway called the Journey Through Hallowed Ground Byway that continues south from Pennsylvania to Monticello, Virginia.

=== Kinzua ===
The Kinzua Scenic Byway runs along SR 3011 between US 6 and PA 59 in McKean County. The byway provides access to Kinzua Bridge State Park, the site of the Kinzua Bridge. Nearby the byway is Bradford, which is home to Crook Farm Homestead and the Zippo/Case Visitors Center.

=== Lake Wilhelm ===
The Lake Wilhelm Scenic Byway runs along Creek Road in Mercer County, serving Maurice K. Goddard State Park, which is home to Lake Wilhelm.

=== Laurel Highlands ===
The Laurel Highlands Scenic Byway runs along PA 381 and PA 711 from the West Virginia border in Fayette County north to Seward in Westmoreland County. The byway runs through rural areas of the Laurel Highlands, providing access to Ohiopyle State Park, Fallingwater, Kentuck Knob, Laurel Caverns, and Fort Ligonier.

=== Lebanon Cornwall ===
The Lebanon Cornwall Scenic Byway follows PA 419 between Cornwall and Newmanstown in Lebanon County. The byway runs through the Pennsylvania Dutch Country, serving the Middlecreek Wildlife Preserve, the Lebanon Valley Rail Trail, and the Cornwall Iron Furnace.

=== Longhouse ===
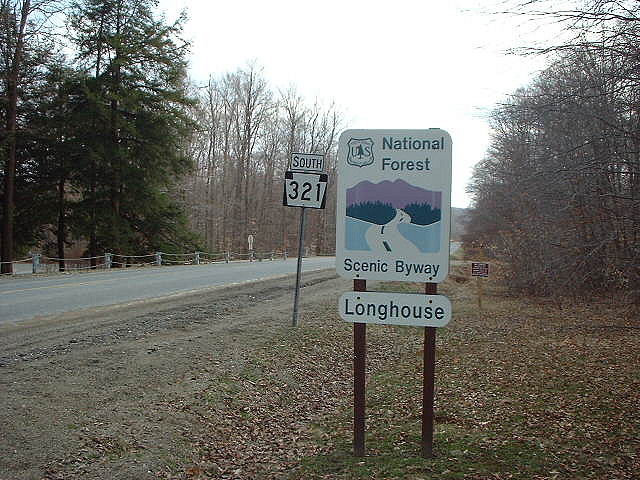
Longhouse National Forest Scenic Byway marker along PA 321

The Longhouse National Forest Scenic Byway follows a loop along PA 321, PA 59, and Forest Road 262 in Warren and McKean counties. The byway is located in the Allegheny National Forest, passing by the Allegheny Reservoir.

=== National Road ===
The National Road Scenic Byway follows the historic National Road along US 40 between the West Virginia and Maryland borders in Washington, Fayette, and Somerset counties. The byway serves historical sites including Fort Necessity National Battlefield, the Brownsville Northside Historic District, and Bowman's Castle. The byway is also part of an All-American Road called the Historic National Road.

=== Route 6 Heritage Corridor ===
The Route 6 Heritage Corridor Scenic Byway follows US 6 through Warren, McKean, Potter, and Tioga counties in the northern part of the state. The corridor features many small towns and scenic views.

=== Seaway Trail ===
The Seaway Trail Scenic Byway runs from the Ohio border to the New York border in Erie County, following US 20, PA 5, PA 5 Alt., Bayfront Parkway, PA 5 Alt., and PA 5, where the Seaway Trail continues into New York. The byway provides access to many sites along Lake Erie, including Presque Isle State Park, the Erie Maritime Museum, the Presque Isle Lighthouse, the 1867 Land Lighthouse, Mazza Vineyards, the Tom Ridge Environmental Center, and the USS Niagara. The Seaway Trail is also a National Scenic Byway.

=== U.S. Route 202 Parkway ===
The U.S. Route 202 Parkway Scenic Byway follows the US 202 parkway between PA 63 in Montgomery Township, Montgomery County and PA 611 in Doylestown Township, Bucks County. The parkway contains a shared-use path and is designed to blend in with the physical surroundings.

=== Viaduct Valley Way ===
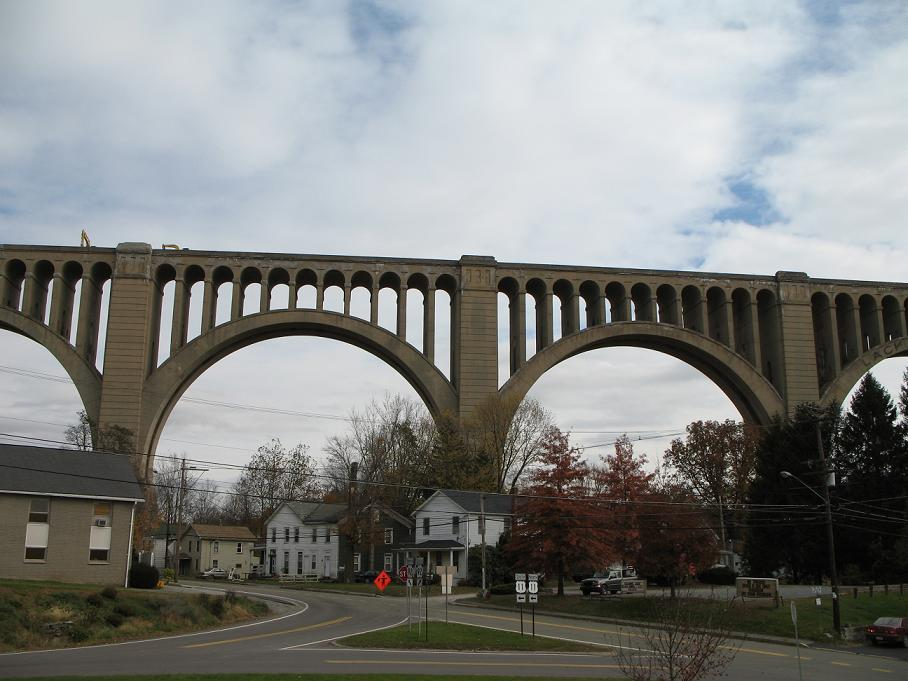
The Viaduct Valley Way Scenic Byway passing under the Tunkhannock Viaduct

The Viaduct Valley Way Scenic Byway follows PA 92 between Tunkhannock, Wyoming County and Lanesboro, Susquehanna County. The byway provides access to two railroad viaducts, the Starrucca Viaduct and the Tunkhannock Viaduct, along with the Susquehanna County Historical Society Museum and The Florence Shelly Preserve.
