= Dennison Fork (Fish Dam Run tributary) =

Stream in Pennsylvania, USA

Dennison Fork Tributary to Fish Dam Run
- Location of Dennison Fork mouth Dennison Fork (Fish Dam Run tributary) (the United States)

Location
- Country: United States
- State: Pennsylvania
- County: Clinton

Physical characteristics
- Source: divide of East Branch Big Run and Swamp Branch
  - location: about 6 miles south-southwest of Renovo, Pennsylvania
  - coordinates: 41°14′4.24″N 077°47′3.96″W
  - elevation: 2,070 ft (630 m)
- Mouth: Fish Dam Run
  - location: about 6 miles southwest of Renovo, Pennsylvania
  - coordinates: 41°15′2.24″N 077°50′12.97″W
  - elevation: 1,037 ft (316 m)
- Length: 3.03 mi (4.88 km)
- Basin size: 3.08 square miles (8.0 km^{2})
- Discharge
  - location: Fish Dam Run
  - average: 5.24 cu ft/s (0.148 m^{3}/s) at mouth with Fish Dam Run

Basin features
- Progression: Fish Dam Run → West Branch Susquehanna River → Susquehanna River → Chesapeake Bay → Atlantic Ocean
- River system: West Branch Susquehanna River
- Tributaries
  - left: unnamed tributaries
  - right: unnamed tributaries
- Bridges: none

Dennison Fork is a stream located northwest of Lock Haven, about 6.9 miles from Renovo in Noyes Township, Pennsylvania, in the United States. The stream is located south east of Cooks Run. The Dennison Fork branches off from the Fish Dam Run stream, which branches off from the south side of the West Branch Susquehanna River.

The Dennison Fork is located along the Chuck Keiper Trail within the Sproul State Forest.

On May 31, 1985, a tornado ripped through North Central Pennsylvania. As a result, over 8,000 acres of forest land in the Sproul State Forest was flattened. The Dennison Fork Trail, located on the Chuck Keiper Trail was damaged severely. As a result, the trail in this area has been relocated. The only access to the Chuck Keiper Trail is via Pennsylvania Route 144, through the vastly underpopulated and lonely plateau between Renovo and Snow Shoe, Pennsylvania.

The Dennison Fork was most likely named after the Dennison family that settled and resided in Clinton County, Pennsylvania as early as the 1840s. The Dennison family moved between Leidy, Keating and Noyes Townships in Clinton County, but maintained possession of a parcel of land on the banks of the West Branch Susquehanna River in Noyes Township, known as the Dennison tract.

== See also ==
- List of rivers of Pennsylvania
- Chuck Keiper Trail
