= T-Squared Trail =

Hiking trail in Pennsylvania, United States

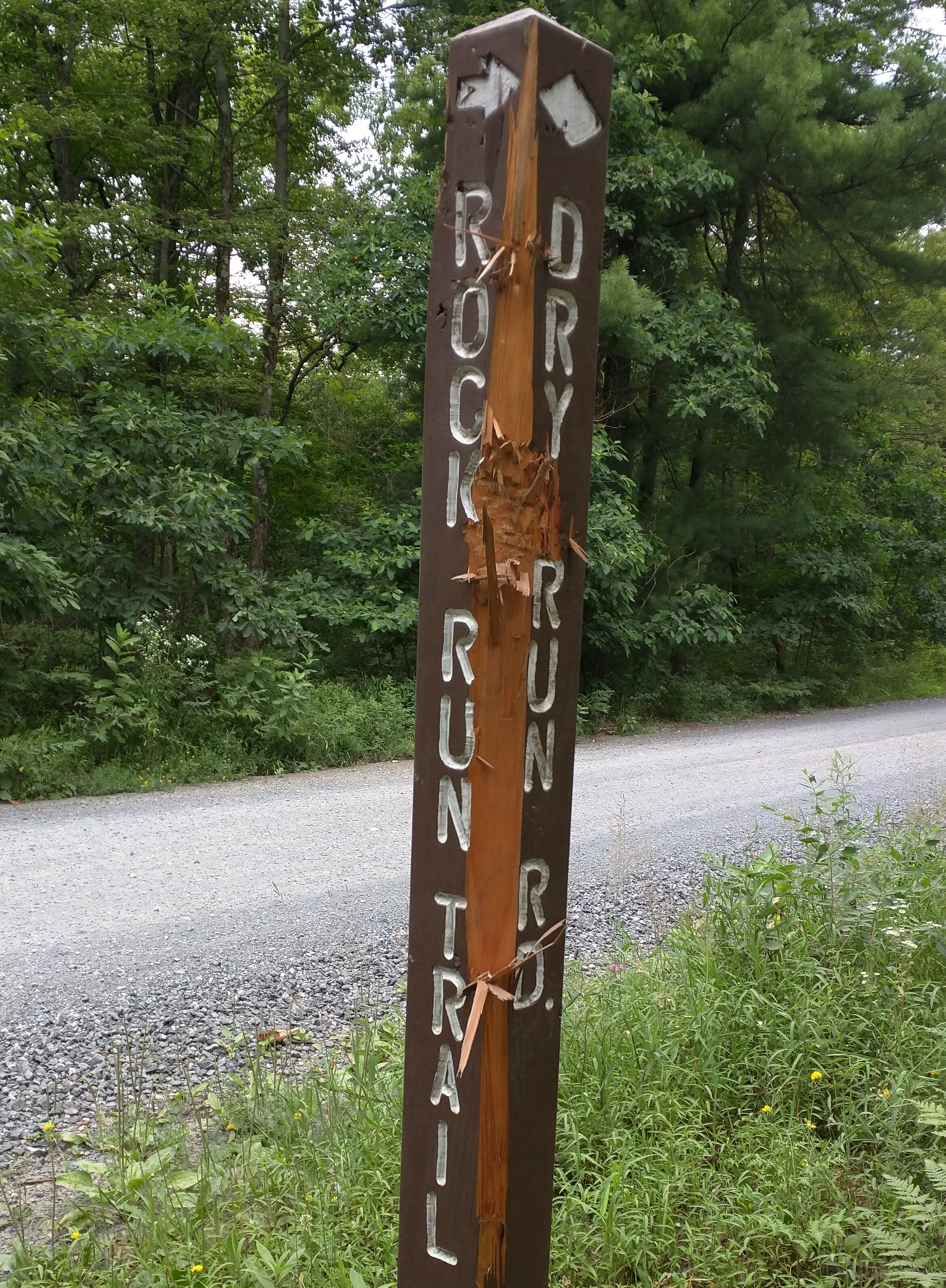
- A bear-chewed junction sign on the T-Squared Trail
- Length: 5.7 mi (9.2 km)
- Location: Clinton County and Lycoming County, Pennsylvania, US
- Trailheads: Donut Hole Trail and Black Forest Trail
- Use: Hiking
- Elevation change: High
- Difficulty: Strenuous
- Season: Year-round
- Hazards: Uneven and wet terrain, rattlesnakes, mosquitoes, ticks, black bears

The T-Squared Trail is a 5.7-mile (9.2 km) linear hiking trail in north-central Pennsylvania, through portions of Sproul State Forest and Tiadaghton State Forest. For most hikers, the T-Squared Trail serves as a connection between two long-distance backpacking routes: the Donut Hole Trail and the Black Forest Trail.

== History and route ==
The T-Squared Trail was constructed in the early 2000s as a route between the Donut Hole Trail and the Black Forest Trail, both long-distance backpacking routes in north-central Pennsylvania that pass near each other but do not meet. The T-Squared Trail was named after longtime Pennsylvania hiking historian and trail builder Tom Thwaites, who was largely responsible for the state's longest continuous backpacking route: the Mid State Trail. The T-Squared Trail was formed from several short trails in the area, with a few new connectors and two very short walks along dirt roads. Neither end of the trail is near parking or paved road access, though informal parking is available at the trail's encounter with Dry Run Road.

The T-Squared Trail begins at a junction with the Donut Hole Trail, along Cougar Run in Sproul State Forest and about five miles north of Hyner Run State Park. The T-Squared Trail heads to the north and immediately climbs very steeply to the top of the Allegheny Plateau and then briefly traverses a high hilltop area. It then plunges steeply to Mill Run at 1.5 miles and again climbs steeply back to the top of the plateau. This time the trail remains on relatively high ground and walks briefly on Dry Run Road at 3.0 miles, near the border into Tiadaghton State Forest. The trail continues northbound and jogs briefly on Benson Road at 4.6 miles. At 4.8 miles the T-Squared Trail reaches a junction with the Baldwin Point Trail, an older path that leads from Pennsylvania Route 44 to a significant vista, and the two trails are concurrent for the next half of a mile. When the trails split at 5.3 miles, the T-Squared Trail heads east and plunges very steeply into the hollow formed by an upper tributary of Baldwin Branch. At 5.7 miles, the T-Squared Trail ends at the Black Forest Trail, about eight-tenths of a mile west of PA Route 44.
