= Jack Paulhamus/Garby Trail =

Hiking trail in Pennsylvania

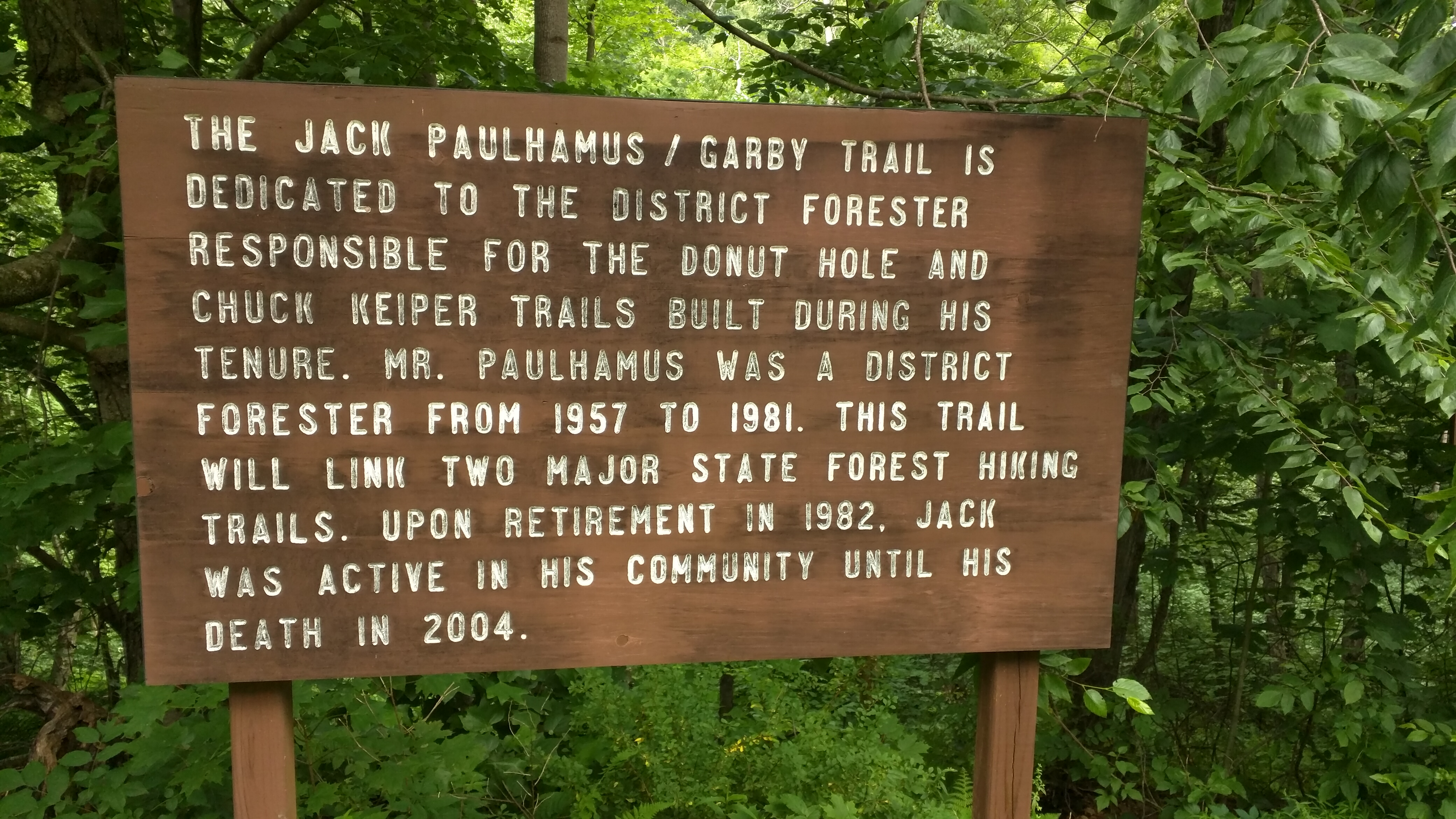
- A sign on the Jack Paulhamus/Garby Trail, honoring the trail's namesake.
- Length: 13.2 mi (21.2 km)
- Location: Clinton County, Pennsylvania, US
- Trailheads: Hyner Run State Park and Chuck Keiper Trail
- Use: Hiking
- Elevation change: Very high
- Difficulty: Strenuous
- Season: Year-round
- Hazards: Uneven and wet terrain, rattlesnakes, mosquitoes, ticks, black bears

The Jack Paulhamus/Garby Trail is a 13.2-mile (21.2 km) hiking trail in north-central Pennsylvania, through portions of Sproul State Forest. It was built to connect the Donut Hole Trail and Chuck Keiper Trail. A portion of its route is concurrent with the Donut Hole Trail. The JPG is known for its significant climbing, as it features two very low points at Hyner Run and the West Branch Susquehanna River, with high ground on top of the Allegheny Plateau in between.

== History and route ==
Two long-distance backpacking routes that were built in north-central Pennsylvania in the 1970s, the Donut Hole Trail and Chuck Keiper Trail, pass relatively close to each other but are separated by the deep canyon formed by the West Branch Susquehanna River. In the early 2000s, a group of students at Lock Haven University conceived the idea to design a connector trail as a class project. The students combined letters from their surnames and coined the name Garby Trail, which does not reflect an actual person or any natural feature along the route. The proposed route combined several short pre-existing trails, a walk along Pennsylvania Route 120 over the river, and a few new connecting segments. Meanwhile, longtime state forester Jack Paulhamus, who had been involved in the creation of both the Donut Hole and Chuck Keiper Trails, died in 2004. As a commemoration, his name was added to the new trail being designed to connect his two creations, so the route became known as the Jack Paulhamus/Garby Trail (JPG).

The northern terminus of the JPG is at Hyner Run State Park, at a spot where the Donut Hole Trail formerly entered the park and departed to the east. In 2015, the Donut Hole Trail was extensively rerouted to the south and was added to the existing route of the JPG. Thus, for the JPG's first 5.3 miles when hiking southbound, it is now concurrent with the Donut Hole Trail. South of the state park, the combined trail climbs vigorously to the top of the Allegheny Plateau, with several significant vistas. At 5.3 miles, the Donut Hole Trail splits off and the JPG descends steeply along Huff Run and into the deep canyon formed by the West Branch Susquehanna River.

The JPG reaches the level of the river at 6.7 miles, and walks along a paved side road to a junction with Pennsylvania Route 120. The JPG follows that highway's bridge over the river and then uses several driveways through private land owned by the Western Clinton Sportsman's Association. From the hollow formed by Little McCloskey Run, the JPG begins another intensive climb back to the top of the plateau once again, with several vistas over the river and canyon on the way up. The trail reaches the plateau-top at 10.8 miles and proceeds across high ground for the rest of its distance. It turns west on Grugan Hollow Road (also known as Mill Run Road) at 12.0 miles, and follows that road until ending at 13.2 miles, at a junction where the East Loop of the Chuck Keiper Trail crosses the road.
