= Eagleton Mine Camp Trail =

Trail network in Pennsylvania, United States

- Length: 24 mi (39 km)
- Location: Clinton County, Pennsylvania, US
- Use: Hiking
- Elevation change: Moderate
- Difficulty: Moderate
- Season: Year-round
- Hazards: Uneven and rocky terrain, rattlesnakes, mosquitoes, ticks, black bears

The Eagleton Mine Camp Trail is an approximately 24-mile (39 km) shared-use trail network in north-central Pennsylvania, in Sproul State Forest. The total trail distance includes several different linear trails that can be used to form one-way and loop routes of various lengths. The trail system is often used for mountain biking but is open to hiking and horseback riding as well.

== History and description ==
The Eagleton Mine Camp Trail was developed in 2006 and utilizes several old road and railroad grades associated with a coal mining community that was active from approximately 1845 to 1870. The former Eagleton Coal and Iron Company built several villages for workers, and some parts of the community were funded by the royal family of Spain. The remote community was also known for alcohol bootlegging. Some ruins can be seen along the route, though most of the former structures and transportation routes have been reclaimed by the forest. The trail network is reached from Pennsylvania Route 120, about 15 miles west of Lock Haven, via the unpaved Eagleton Road.
