= Jericho, Pennsylvania =

Jericho, Pennsylvania may refer to:

- Jericho, Cameron County, Pennsylvania, an unincorporated community
- Jericho, Wayne County, Pennsylvania, an unincorporated community
