= Young Womans =

Young Womans or Young Woman's may refer to:

- Young Womans Creek, a tributary of the West Branch Susquehanna River in Pennsylvania
- Young Woman's Journal, an official publication of The Church of Jesus Christ of Latter-day Saints between 1897 and 1929
- Young Women (organization), a youth organization, often referred to incorrectly as Young Woman's
