= Black Forest Trail =

Hiking trail in north-central Pennsylvania

Coordinates: 41°30′31″N 77°29′49″W

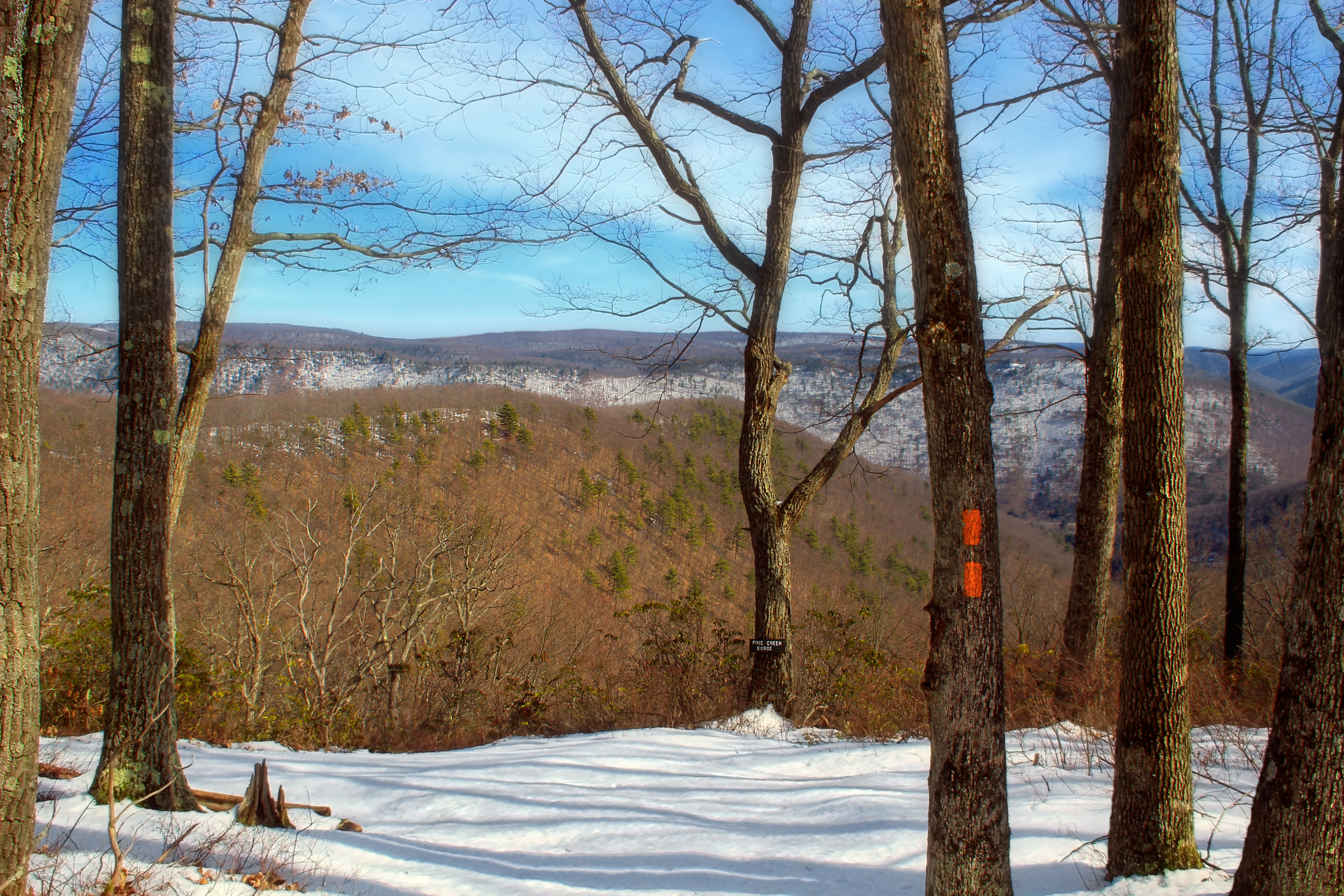
- Canyon vista on the Black Forest Trail
- Length: 43.0 mi (69.2 km)
- Location: Lycoming County, Potter County, and Clinton County, Pennsylvania, United States
- Trailheads: Slate Run, Pennsylvania
- Use: Hiking
- Elevation change: Very high
- Difficulty: Strenuous
- Season: Year-round
- Hazards: Uneven and wet terrain, rattlesnakes, mosquitoes, ticks, black bears

The Black Forest Trail is a 43.0-mile (69.2 km) (Note: This distance reflects a relocation at Slate Run that was constructed in 2014 and has not yet been described in a published trail guide as of 2025.) hiking trail in north-central Pennsylvania, forming a loop through portions of Tiadaghton State Forest and routed through Pine Creek Gorge and areas of the Allegheny Plateau above the gorge. Most of the trail is in Lycoming County, with about five miles in Potter County and a very brief segment in Clinton County. The trail was named after the region's original forest landscape, which reminded immigrant loggers of the Schwarzwald ("black forest") region of Germany.

The Black Forest Trail has been cited as one of the most scenic and challenging backpacking routes in Pennsylvania, with dozens of expansive vistas, several rugged descents into and out of Pine Creek Gorge, and remote plateau areas with evidence of railroad and logging operations from the late nineteenth century.

== Route ==
The Black Forest Trail is traditionally described in the counter-clockwise direction, starting at the village of Slate Run, near PA Route 414 within Pine Creek Gorge. Hikers were traditionally forced to cross the wide Slate Run to begin the hike, but a footbridge was opened in 2014. All the distances below are from that footbridge. (Note: These distances are based on measurements made in 2021, which have not yet been described in a published trail guide as of 2025 but are verifiable on state forest maps.) The trail first heads north and climbs very steeply to the top of the Allegheny Plateau above the gorge. It traverses Algerine Natural Area, and at 3.3 miles reaches a junction with the Long Branch Trail, which heads northeast for 8.5 miles to the West Rim Trail. The Black Forest Trail then turns west and plunges very steeply into an extensive side gorge formed by Slate Run and its tributaries, and crosses the Francis Branch of the run via a campground driveway bridge at 7.5 miles.

The Black Forest Trail then climbs steeply back to the top of the plateau, traverses relatively easy high ground for several miles, and crosses PA Route 44 for the first time at 12.8 miles. In this area the trail twice encounters a 13 mile-long cross-country skiing loop trail called the Sentiero di Shay, which was named after Italian laborers who built the railroads in this area in the late 1800s. At 13.6 miles, the Black Forest Trail passes a junction with the North Link Trail, which heads west for 8.5 miles to the Susquehannock Trail System. Now heading south, the Black Forest Trail follows the County Line Branch of Young Womans Creek, crossing it several times over the next several miles. At 15.8 miles the trail climbs steeply back to the top of the plateau, and crosses high ground for the next several miles with several vistas into multiple branches of the hollow formed by Young Womans Creek. At 20.8 miles the trail plunges steeply again, this time into the upper reaches of a side gorge formed by the Baldwin Branch of the creek, and passes the crumbling ruins of a railroad foreman's stone hut at 21.1 miles. At 21.6 miles the trail passes a junction with the South Link Trail, which heads west 5.9 miles to the Suquehannock Trail System. The next junction is with the T-Squared Trail, which heads south 5.7 miles to the Donut Hole Trail.

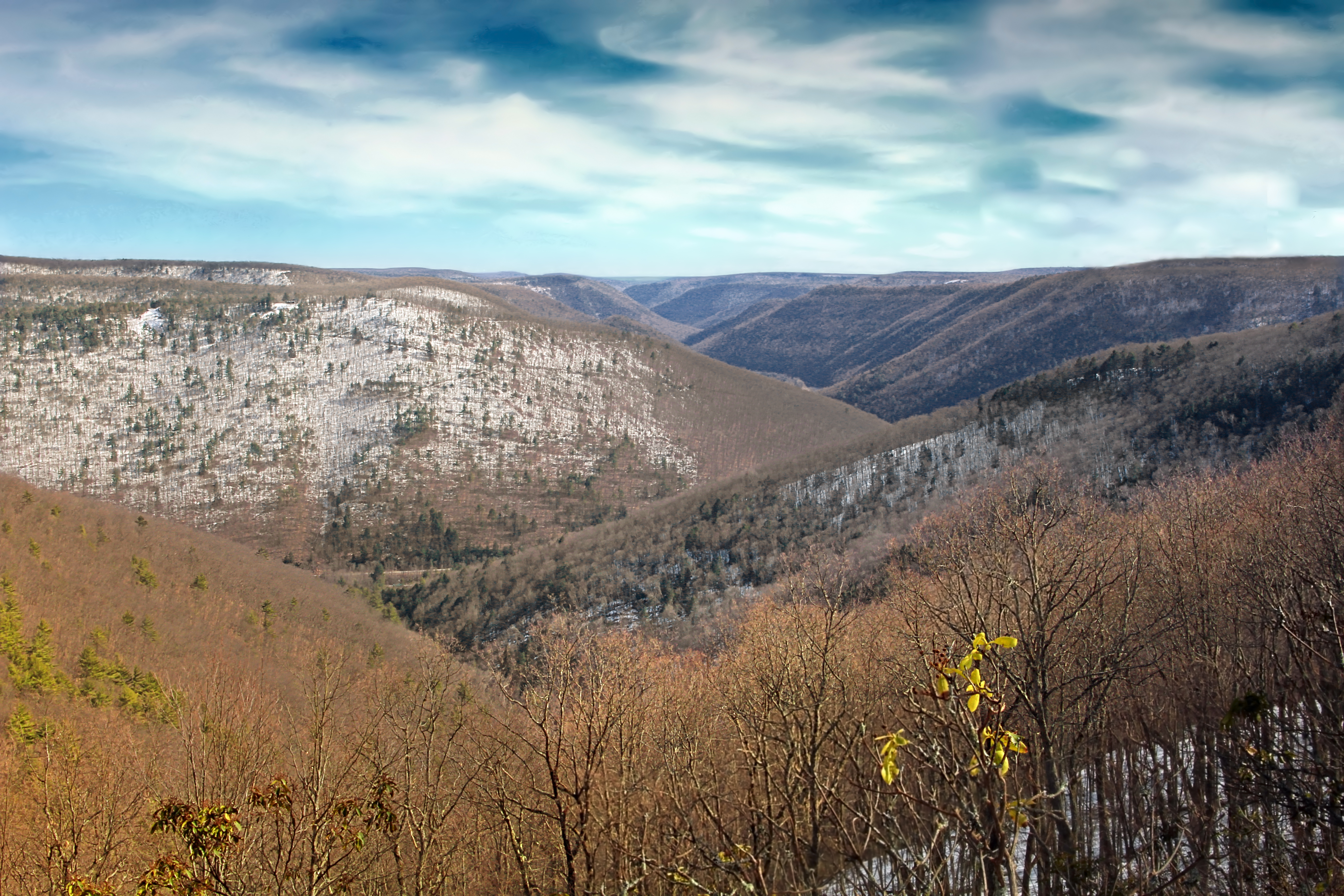
View of the Naval Run and Pine Creek Gorges from the Black Forest Trail

After climbing back to the top of the plateau again, the Black Forest Trail crosses PA Route 44 for the second time at 23.2 miles, and returns to the edge of Pine Creek Gorge at 25.2 miles. For the rest of its distance, the trail plunges steeply into the main gorge or its tributary gorges and then climbs vigorously back out five different times, with short stretches of rocky ridge-top or plateau-top hiking between. Starting at 30.5 miles, the trail follows the scenic Naval Run for about a mile and reaches relatively close to Pine Creek before climbing up the side of the gorge yet again. At 36.9 miles the trail returns to the high plateau near PA Route 44 and becomes relatively easy for about two miles. At 39.7 miles the trail reaches the side gorge formed by Slate Run, on the opposite side from the trail's route back near its beginning. The trail makes its final steep descent and reaches the side of Slate Run at 40.7 miles, and then joins an easy logging railroad grade. Near the village of Slate Run, the trail follows the paved Slate Run Road for a short distance, then the loop ends after 43.0 miles at the trailhead at the footbridge over Slate Run.
