= Pennsylvania Wilds =

Region in northern Pennsylvania

Coordinates: 41°25′N 78°00′W

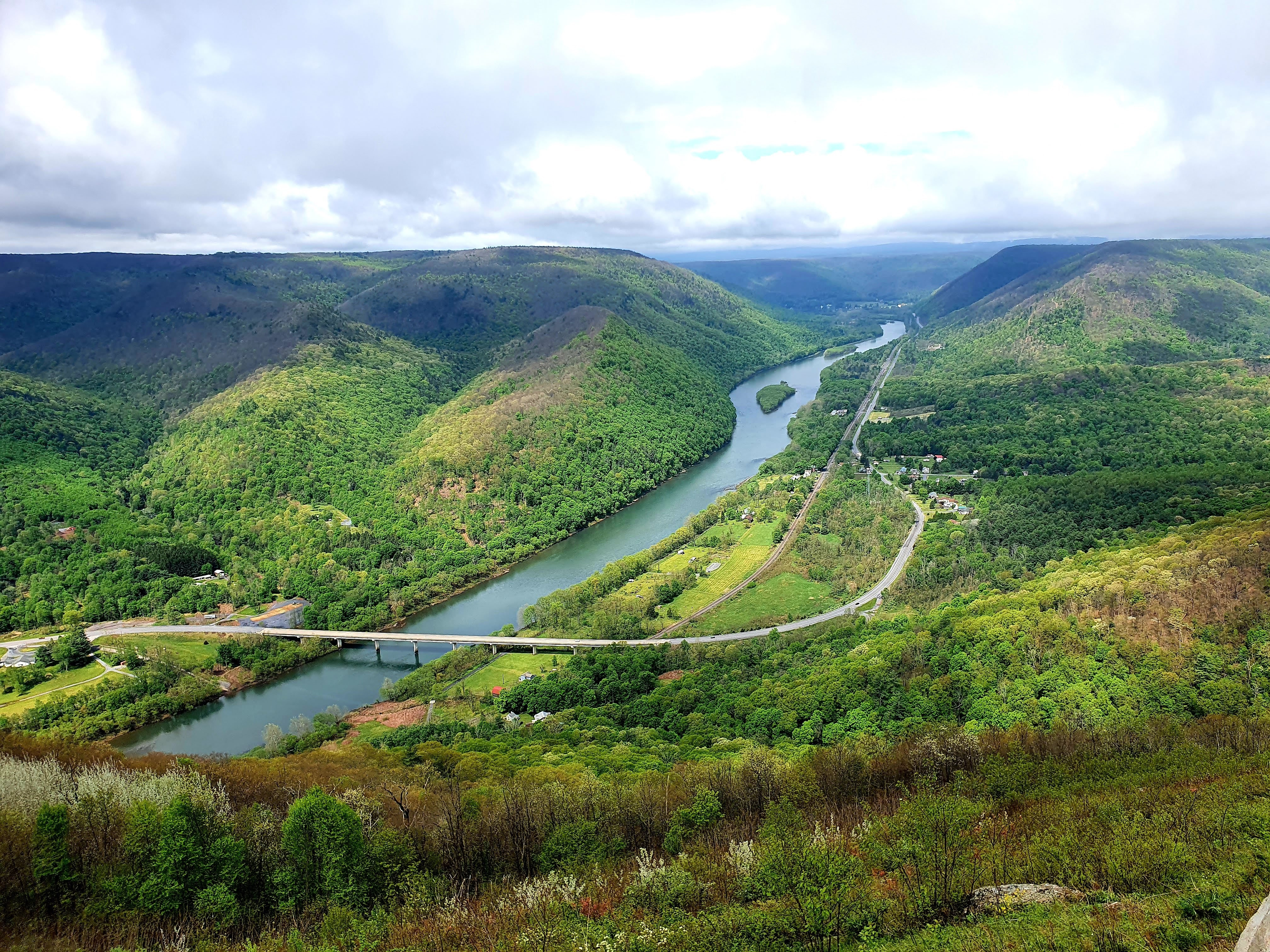
The view from Hyner View State Park towards the West Branch Susquehanna River in Bucktail State Park Natural Area. The bridge across the river carries Pennsylvania Route 120

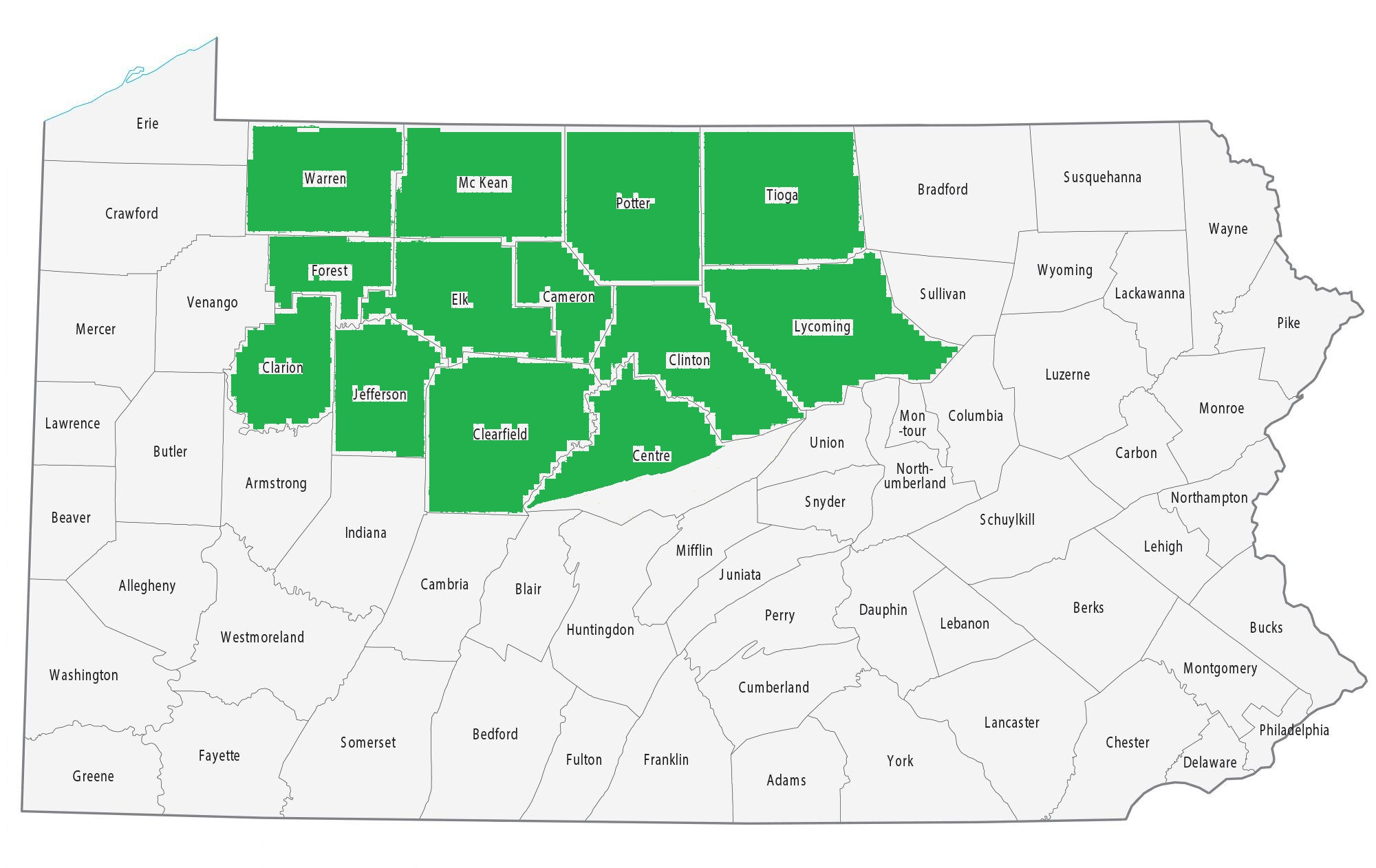
Pennsylvania Wilds (in green) on the map of Pennsylvania

The Pennsylvania Wilds, or the Pennsylvania Wilds Conservation Landscape, is a predominantly rural and forested region in northern central Pennsylvania, mostly within the Allegheny Plateau. It covers about a quarter of the state's territory, but is home to only 4% of its population. It is one of Pennsylvania's 11 state-designated tourist regions.

The region includes several state parks and other tourist destinations, including Hyner View State Park, Cherry Springs State Park, Kinzua Bridge State Park, Leonard Harrison State Park, Colton Point State Park, Susquehannock State Forest, Pennsylvania Grand Canyon, and Pine Creek Rail Trail. Two rivers in the Pennsylvania Wilds - Allegheny and Clarion - are designated as parts of the National Wild and Scenic Rivers System. The West Branch Susquehanna River flows through the region.

== History ==
=== Colonial period ===
The British colonial government purchased land from the Haudenosaunee in the Treaty of Fort Stanwix of 1768, opening new lands in Pennsylvania for settlement, including the I-80 frontier in what is now the Pennsylvania Wilds. However, the treaty's Line of Property (or Purchase Line) border along the West Branch was disputed. The western border divided colonial Pennsylvania and Indian Country along Tiadaghton Creek. The colonial government claimed this was Pine Creek, the Kanien'kehá:ka, Oneida, and other indigenous peoples claimed it was Lycoming Creek. The Pennsylvanian government recognized tribal claims and so all land west of Lycoming Creek was considered Native American and off bounds for settlement until a resolution could be found. Despite this, illegal settlers settled in the disputed area along the West Branch Susquehanna River, the west bank of Lycoming Creek, Larrys Creek, and especially at the mouth of Pine Creek. The land was formally associated with Northumberland County, but a group of organized squatters near modern Jersey Shore elected three commissioners each March who became responsible for seeing that everyone in the area was dealt with fairly. This became known as the Fairplay System.

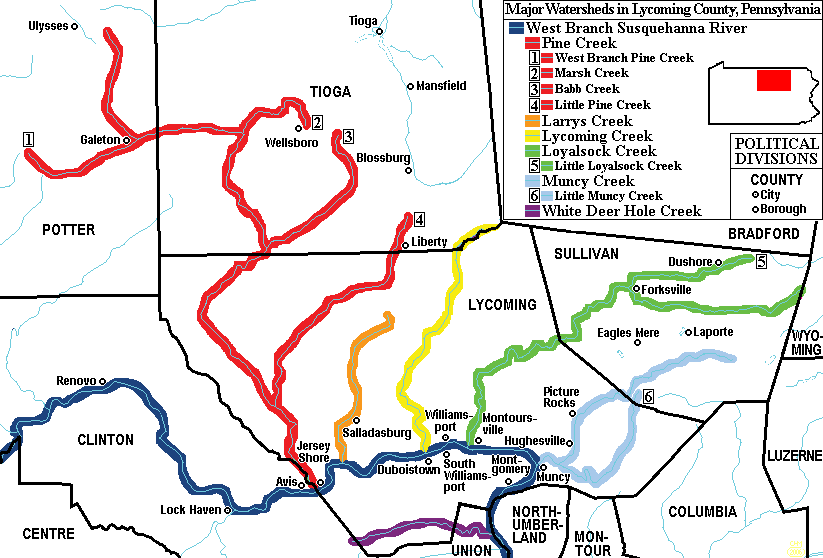
Map of the West Branch Susquehanna River (dark blue) and Major Streams in Lycoming County, Pennsylvania. Pine Creek (red) and Lycoming Creek (yellow) were each claimed to be "Tiadaghton Creek", the disputed boundary between Native American and colonial lands.

=== Pennsylvania frontier ===
The Fair Play Men and their system continued after the end of the war. In 1784, a second Treaty at Fort Stanwix ceded Six Nations lands to the new government of the United States (and recognized Pine Creek as "Tiadaghton Creek"). When the land office opened in May 1785, the Fairplayers were no longer illegal settlers and their existing land claims were recognized. In 1795 Lycoming County was formed from Northumberland County. It took up most of the land that is now Pennsylvania Wilds. As settlers entered the frontier, many organized their own counties. The following counties have been formed from land that was once part of Lycoming County: Armstrong, Bradford, Centre, Clearfield, Clinton, Indiana, Jefferson, McKean, Potter, Sullivan, Tioga, Venango, Warren, Forest, Elk and Cameron.

=== Lumber age ===
The abundance of hardwood forests in the region lead to harvesting of lumber becoming the main economic driver in the area in the second half of the 19th century, when Williamsport, the county seat of Lycoming County, was known as "The Lumber Capital of the World". By the beginning of the 20th century, the extensive harvesting led to deforestation and subsequent decline of lumber industry in the region. By the 21st century, the forests in the Pennsylvania Wilds have been mostly regrown. Williamsport, population 28,437, remains the most populous settlement in the wilds.

=== Creation of the Pennsylvania Wilds ===
The notion of the Pennsylvania Wilds was not in widespread use until the Pennsylvania Wilds Initiative was launched in 2003 to promote the region's nature tourism industry.

== Counties ==
The Pennsylvania Wilds comprises all of the following 12 counties: Warren, McKean, Potter, Tioga, Lycoming, Clinton, Elk, Cameron, Forest, Clearfield, Clarion, Jefferson, and the northwestern part of Centre county.
