= East Branch Swamp Natural Area =

Natural area in Pennsylvania

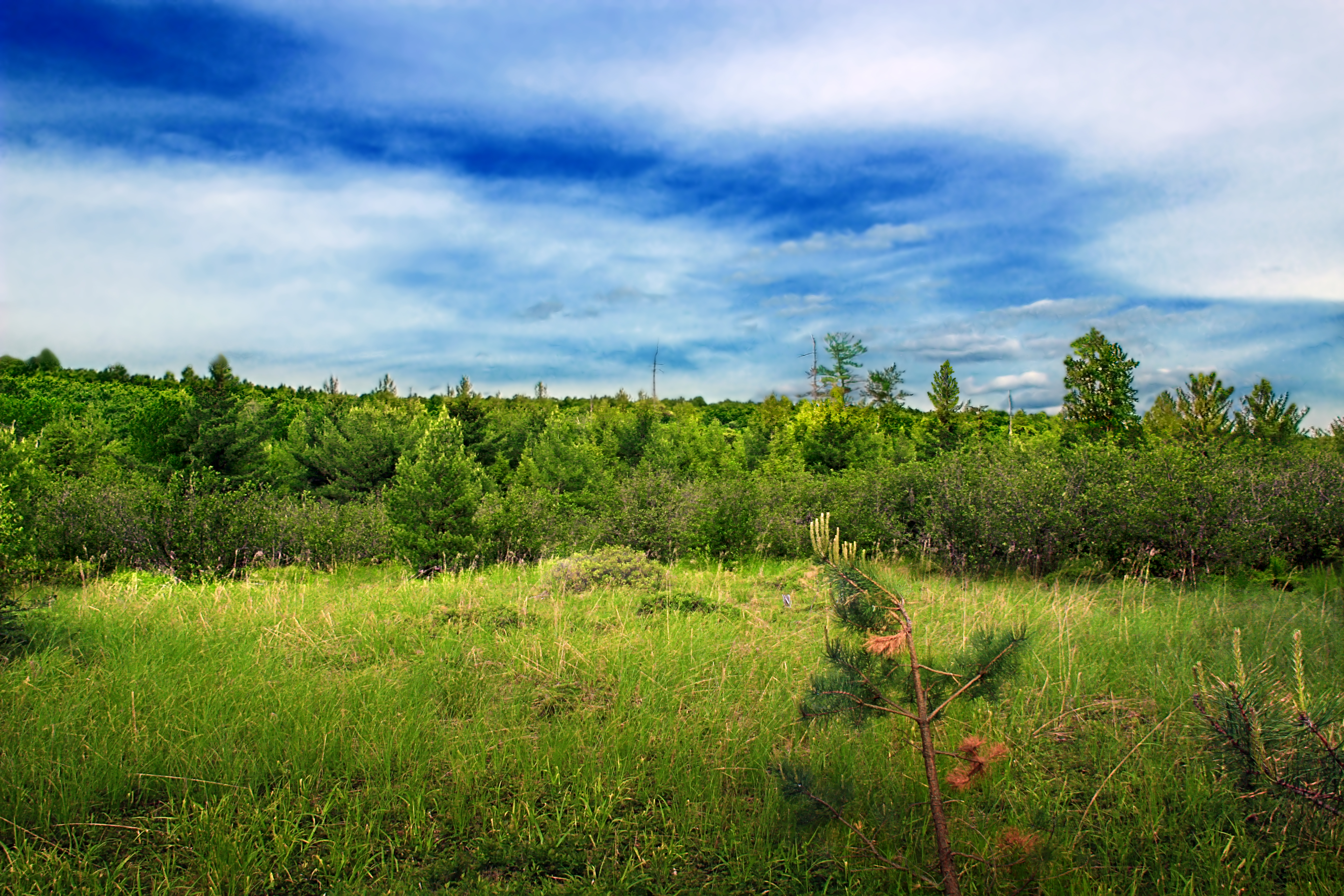

- Location within Pennsylvania
- Location: Clinton County, Pennsylvania
- Nearest town: Renovo
- Coordinates: 41°14′02″N 77°46′12″W
- Area: 186 acres (75 ha)

East Branch Swamp Natural Area is a 186-acre (75 ha) protected area in Clinton County, Pennsylvania, United States. It is part of Sproul State Forest.

== Description ==
The Natural Area was established to protect a bog of a type that is uncommon in Pennsylvania, where a mix of logging practices in the early 1900s and tornadoes in the 1980s created a large treeless area in a poorly-drained depression.The area includes some old-growth hemlock trees that survived the logging era. The unique landscape is home to many species of songbirds and a population of black bears. It has also been noted for stands of trees that are uncommon in the region, such as white birch and black cherry. The area is skirted by the cross-connector of the Chuck Keiper Trail, and a parallel path called the Little Beaver Trail travels through the center of the area.
