= Drury Run =

Stream in Pennsylvania, United States

Coordinates: 41.325844°N 77.776773°W

Drury Run (also known as Drury's Run) is a tributary of the West Branch Susquehanna River in Clinton County, Pennsylvania, in the United States. It is 7.71 miles (12.41 km) long and its watershed is 11.5 square miles in area, most of which is forest. The stream's tributaries are affected by acid mine drainage, as are the lower reaches of the stream itself. It begins in Tamarack Swamp and flows through Leidy Township, Noyes Township, and Renovo. Brook trout, brown trout, creek chub, and eastern blacknose dace all inhabit the stream.

== Course ==
Drury Run begins in the Tamarack Swamp, near the community of Tamarack, in Leidy Township. The stream begins flowing southwards, following Pennsylvania Route 144. It passes Cove Hollow, Cal Hollow, Pong Hollow, and Jordan Hollow over the next several miles. It then flows into a valley which gradually gets deeper and narrower. In the southern part of Leidy Township, it picks up the tributaries Sandy Run and Woodley Draft and the stream bends southeast. At the southern border of the township, it flows through the Renovo Reservoir and enters Noyes Township, continuing southeast past abandoned strip mines. It picks up the tributary Stony Run before entering the West Branch Susquehanna River on the western edge of Renovo.

=== Tributaries ===
The named tributaries of Drury Run, proceeding downstream, are Sandy Run, Woodley Draft, Whiskey Run, and Stony Run. The Sandy Run sub-watershed has an area of 3.6 square miles (9.3 km^{2}) and 5.45 miles (8.77 km) of streams. The Woodley Draft sub-watershed has an area of 1.1 square miles (2.8 km^{2}) and 1.82 miles (2.93 km) of streams. Whiskey Run is not named in gazetteers or official lists of streams; it consists of acid mine water discharging from a mine pool. The Stony Run sub-watershed has an area of 4.04 square miles (10.5 km^{2}).

== Hydrology ==
The pH of Drury Run ranges from 5.3 to 5.8 at a site downstream of Tamarack Swamp.

At the mouth of Stony Run, the concentration of aluminum in the water is 7.11 milligrams per liter and there is a daily load of 96.65 pounds (43.84 kg). The iron concentration is 0.29 milligrams per liter and the load of this metal is 3.94 pounds (1.79 kg) per day. The concentration of manganese is 11.81 milligrams per liter, with a daily load of 160 pounds (73 kg). The acidity concentration is 67.35 milligrams per liter and the alkalinity concentration is 2.77 milligrams per liter. The daily loads are 915 pounds (415 kg) and 37.6 pounds (17.1 kg), respectively.

At its confluence with Drury Run, Whiskey Run has an aluminum concentration of 11.09 milligrams per liter and the daily load of aluminum is 16.65 pounds (7.55 kg). The iron concentration is 5.3 milligrams per liter and 0.93 pounds (0.42 kg) of iron flows through the stream each day. The concentration of manganese is 11.81 milligrams per liter and the daily load of manganese is 7.96 pounds (3.61 kg). The acidity concentration is 73 milligrams per liter and the alkalinity concentration is 0.83 milligrams per liter. The daily loads of these are 109.68 pounds (49.75 kg) and 1.25 pounds (0.57 kg), respectively. To meet the U.S. Environmental Protection Agency's maximum allowable load requirements, the acidity load would need to be reduced by 99.5%. The total daily load of acid mine drainage in the watershed is 658 pounds (298 kg) per day. The concentration of sulfates at the stream's headwaters is 5.8 milligrams per liter, but at the mouth the concentration is 67 milligrams per liter. The concentration of sulfates at the mouth of the tributary Stony Run is 271 milligrams per liter.

As is typical for streams that begin in a bog, the first 1.0 mile (1.6 km) of Drury Run, near Tamarack Swamp, is stained brown from tannin in the stream. The presence of tannin causes the waters in the upper part of the stream to be slightly acidic. There is a high concentration of dissolved organic compounds in the stream.

Drury Run experiences acid mine drainage, mostly in the final 3.5 miles (5.6 km). The tributary Stony Run is the most affected by acid mine drainage of all the tributaries of the stream.

In 1990, the discharge of Drury Run upstream of Sandy Run's confluence with it ranged from 1,500 to 3,700 U.S. gallons (5,700 to 14,000 liters) per minute.

== Watershed and geology ==
The watershed of Drury Run is located in Clinton County. It is 11.5 square miles in area.

The watershed is underlain by Pennsylvanian age sedimentary rocks of the Pottsville and Allegheny Formations. The Clarion, Lower Kittanning, and Mercer coals are all found in the watershed.

A number of abandoned mines are located in the southern part of the watershed. The watershed is mostly forested.

== History ==
A dam was built on Drury Run in the 1800s and was replaced shortly before 1911. The first school in the community of Renovo was built at the mouth of the stream in 1864.

In 1915, the population of the Drury Run watershed was 47. Around this time, the stream, along with Paddy's Run, was suspected of being the source of a typhoid fever outbreak, but it was determined that the streams were not the source of the outbreak. Up until 1915, the Renovo Water Company used the stream as its water supply.

Coal mining and clay mining has been done in the watersheds of all four of the named tributaries of Drury Run. Underground mining of coal and clay in the Drury Run watershed began in the late 1800s and went on until 1940. Surface mining in the watershed was done between the 1940s and the 1980s.

== Biology ==
Drury Run is a high-quality trout stream from its source at Tamarack Swamp to the mouth of Woodley Draft. Downstream of Woodley Draft, it still supports fish, but is also impaired by acid mine drainage. Brook trout and brown trout live and reproduce in the reaches of the stream that are relatively unaffected by acid mine drainage, but there are no fish in reaches that are significantly affected by mine drainage. Creek chub and eastern blacknose dace also live in the stream. The tributary Stony Run is completely devoid of fish.

Upstream from acid mine inflows, Drury Creek and its tributaries have healthy macroinvertebrate communities. They exhibit high species diversity, with mayflies (an acid-intolerant group) making up more than 40 percent of the macroinvertebrate population. Below the mouth of Sandy Run, the population of mayflies on Drury Run decreases significantly, with acid-resistant stoneflies the most significant macroinvertebrates in the stream. Downstream of Woodley Draft and Whiskey Run, there is less macroinvertebrate diversity in Drury Run, with mayflies making up 2% of the macroinvertebrates. At the mouth the mayfly population makes up under 1% of the macroinvertebrates. Sandy Run is the only tributary with a mayfly population.

== See also ==
- Young Womans Creek, next major tributary downstream
- Kettle Creek (Pennsylvania), next major tributary upstream
- List of rivers of Pennsylvania
