= Fish Dam Run =

Stream in Pennsylvania, USA

Fish Dam Run Tributary to West Branch Susquehanna River
- Location of Fish Dam Run mouth Fish Dam Run (the United States)

Location
- Country: United States
- State: Pennsylvania
- County: Clinton

Physical characteristics
- Source: divide of Panther Branch
  - location: about 7 miles southwest of Renovo, Pennsylvania
  - coordinates: 41°12′35.23″N 077°49′40.97″W
  - elevation: 2,195 ft (669 m)
- Mouth: West Branch Susquehanna River
  - location: about 4 miles southwest of Renovo, Pennsylvania
  - coordinates: 41°16′36.24″N 077°51′12.97″W
  - elevation: 676 ft (206 m)
- Length: 5.42 mi (8.72 km)
- Basin size: 10.27 square miles (26.6 km^{2})
- Discharge
  - location: West Branch Susquehanna River
  - average: 17.41 cu ft/s (0.493 m^{3}/s) at mouth with West Branch Susquehanna River

Basin features
- Progression: West Branch Susquehanna River → Susquehanna River → Chesapeake Bay → Atlantic Ocean
- River system: West Branch Susquehanna River
- Tributaries
  - left: unnamed tributaries
  - right: Dennison Fork
- Bridges: none

Fish Dam Run is a 5.42 mi (8.72 km) long second-order tributary to West Branch Susquehanna River. This is the only stream of this name in the United States.

== Course ==
Fish Dam Run rises about 7 miles (11 km) southwest of Renovo, Pennsylvania in Clinton County and then flows northeast to meet West Branch Susquehanna River about 4 miles southwest of Renovo.

== Watershed ==
Fish Dam Run drains 10.27 square miles (26.6 km^{2}) of area, receives about 43.6 in/year (111 cm/year) of precipitation, and is about 96.77% forested.

== See also ==
- List of Rivers of Pennsylvania
