= Tamarack Swamp Natural Area =

Natural area in Pennsylvania

- Location within Pennsylvania
- Location: Clinton County, Pennsylvania
- Nearest town: Cross Fork
- Coordinates: 41°25′22″N 77°50′28″W
- Area: 267 acres (108 ha)
- Established: 1998

Tamarack Swamp Natural Area is a boreal (non-glacial) bog in Sproul State Forest, in Clinton County, Pennsylvania, United States. It is named for the tamarack tree that is common in the surrounding wetland. The protected natural area consists of 267 acres within the larger Tamarack Swamp complex. Tamarack Swamp is considered an Important Bird Area by Audubon Pennsylvania, and was named as one of the top 100 birding sites in Pennsylvania by the Pennsylvania Game Commission.

== Location and history ==
Tamarack Swamp is located in northern Clinton County, Pennsylvania, northeast of the community of Tamarack and accessible via Pennsylvania Route 144, which passes near the western edge of the wetland. The wetland has a total area of 4000 acres, and serves as the headwaters of Drury Run. Tamarack Swamp is home to the tamarack tree, which is the only deciduous conifer in Pennsylvania.

In about 1827, Alexander Kelly, Montgomery Kelly, George Kelly, and Samuel Kelly settled on the western side of Tamarack Swamp. In about 1865, James Hennessy discovered several moose antlers buried in the wetland, indicating that moose once lived there. In a 1925 book by Francis R. Cope, the author referred to the wetland as "a little oasis in the desert." In the early 1900s, parts of Tamarack Swamp were damaged by logging and development.

Logging was conducted as late as the 1940s, when Hicks Jennings cut down the only remaining virgin spruce in Tamarack Swamp. By 1947, the tamarack and black spruce trees in the wetland were significantly less healthy than they had been around 1900. In the 1990s, the Western Pennsylvania Conservancy added over 9400 acres to Sproul State Forest, including Tamarack Swamp.

There are plans to develop the Tamarack Swamp area, including plans to drill for oil and natural gas in the wetland. Natural gas pipelines have been laid in the swamp. The land that Tamarack Swamp is situated on has multiple owners.

== See also ==
- List of bogs
