= Chuck Keiper Trail =

Hiking trail in Pennsylvania, U.S.

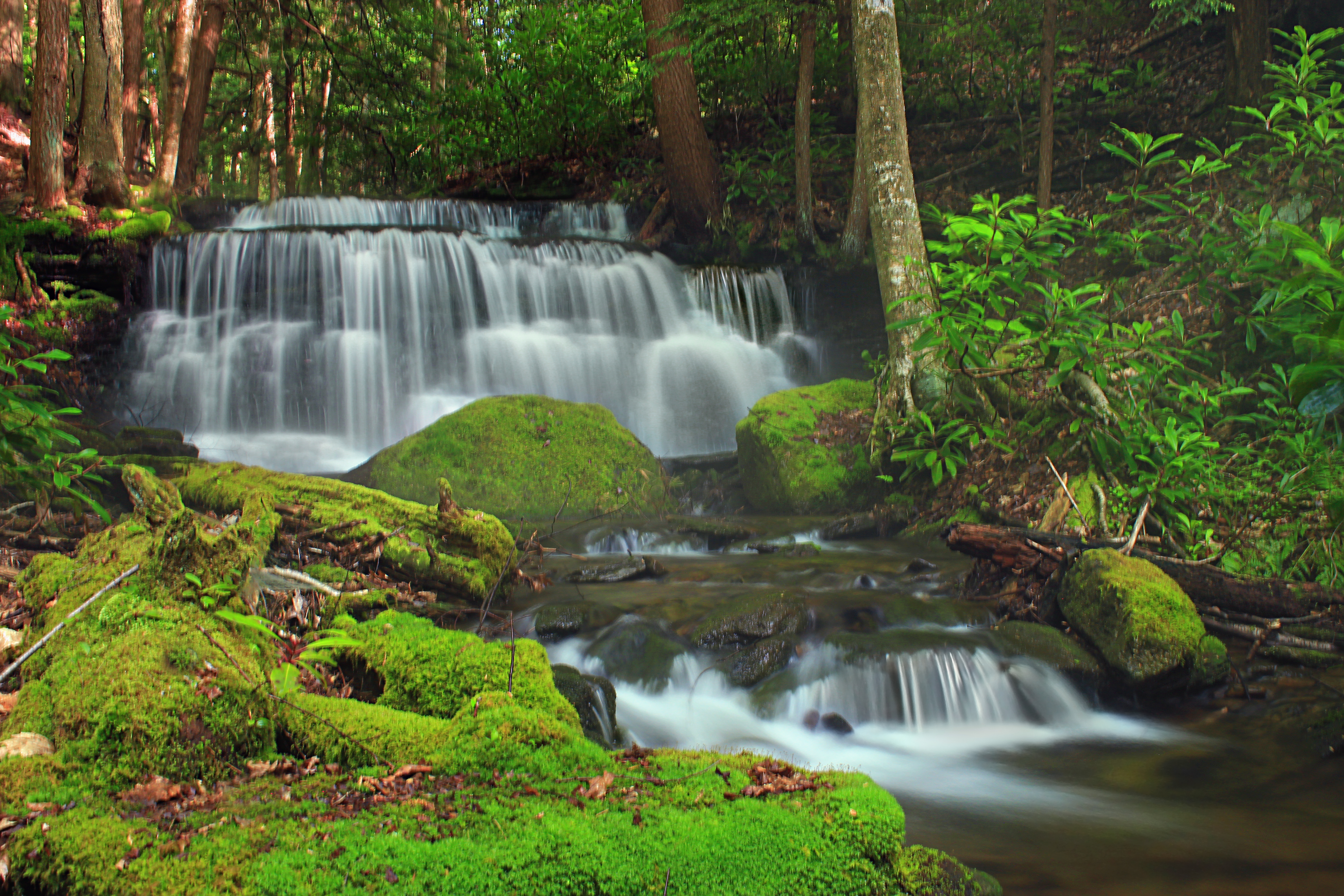
- Waterfall on Yost Run, as seen from the Chuck Keiper Trail.
- Length: 50.6 mi (81.4 km)
- Location: Clinton County and Centre County, Pennsylvania, US
- Trailheads: Pennsylvania Route 144
- Use: Hiking
- Elevation change: High
- Difficulty: Strenuous
- Season: Year-round
- Hazards: Uneven and wet terrain, rattlesnakes, mosquitoes, ticks, black bears

The Chuck Keiper Trail is a hiking trail system in north-central Pennsylvania, consisting of 50.6 linear miles (81.4 km) of trails, forming a loop with a cross-connector through Sproul State Forest. Most of the system is in Clinton County, with a portion of the southwestern segment of the loop in Centre County. The trail is known for traversing one of the least populated regions of Pennsylvania, combining high areas on top of the Allegheny Plateau with many rugged climbs into and out of stream hollows; the trail also visits two state natural areas and two state wild areas. It is often cited as one of Pennsylvania's most remote and difficult backpacking trails.

== History and route ==
The Chuck Keiper (rhymes with "viper") Trail is named after a longtime Pennsylvania Game Commission wildlife conservation officer, and was built in the 1970s with the assistance of the Youth Conservation Corps to visit the most remote areas of Sproul State Forest. The main trailhead is found at the parking area for Fish Dam Vista off of Pennsylvania Route 144 in west-central Clinton County, about ten miles south of Renovo. There is another trailhead with organized parking along the western section of the loop, also just off of PA Route 144 in northern Centre County, about eight miles southwest of Fish Dam Vista.

=== Main loop ===
This description illustrates the main loop in the counter-clockwise direction. From the Fish Dam Vista trailhead, the main loop heads west through a high plateau area. (Fish Dam Vista is also at the northern end of the East Branch Trail, which serves as the system's cross-connector.) The main loop descends to a crossing of Fish Dam Run at 3.5 miles and then climbs vigorously back to the top of the plateau. This segment is within Russell P. Letterman Wild Area. After another rugged descent, reach Burns Run at 6.2 miles and walk along this stream and a tributary before climbing back to the top of the plateau again. This segment is within Burns Run Wild Area. Reach a hunting camp's yard at 9.5 miles and begin yet another rugged descent, this time into the vast system of hollows formed by Yost Run and its tributaries.

The trail reaches the main stem of Yost Run at 11.0 miles and turns to the south, following the hollow upstream for the next few miles. Reach Yost Run Falls at 13.5 miles; at about 12 feet in height, this is one of the tallest waterfalls in central Pennsylvania. The trail then turns to the east and climbs back to the top of the plateau, this time via a hunting camp driveway, and reaches a trailhead parking lot just before crossing PA Route 144 at 14.8 miles. The trail descends again toward Eddy Lick Run, using an old forestry railroad grade and passing the remains of a late-1800s era splash dam at 17.7 miles. The trail rises moderately, crosses DeHaas Road at 19.9 miles, and traverses high areas interspersed with relatively shallow hollows for the next several miles, trending to the north. Reach a junction with the East Branch Trail, the cross connector in the Chuck Keiper Trail system, at 27.9 miles; that trail heads northwest from this point.

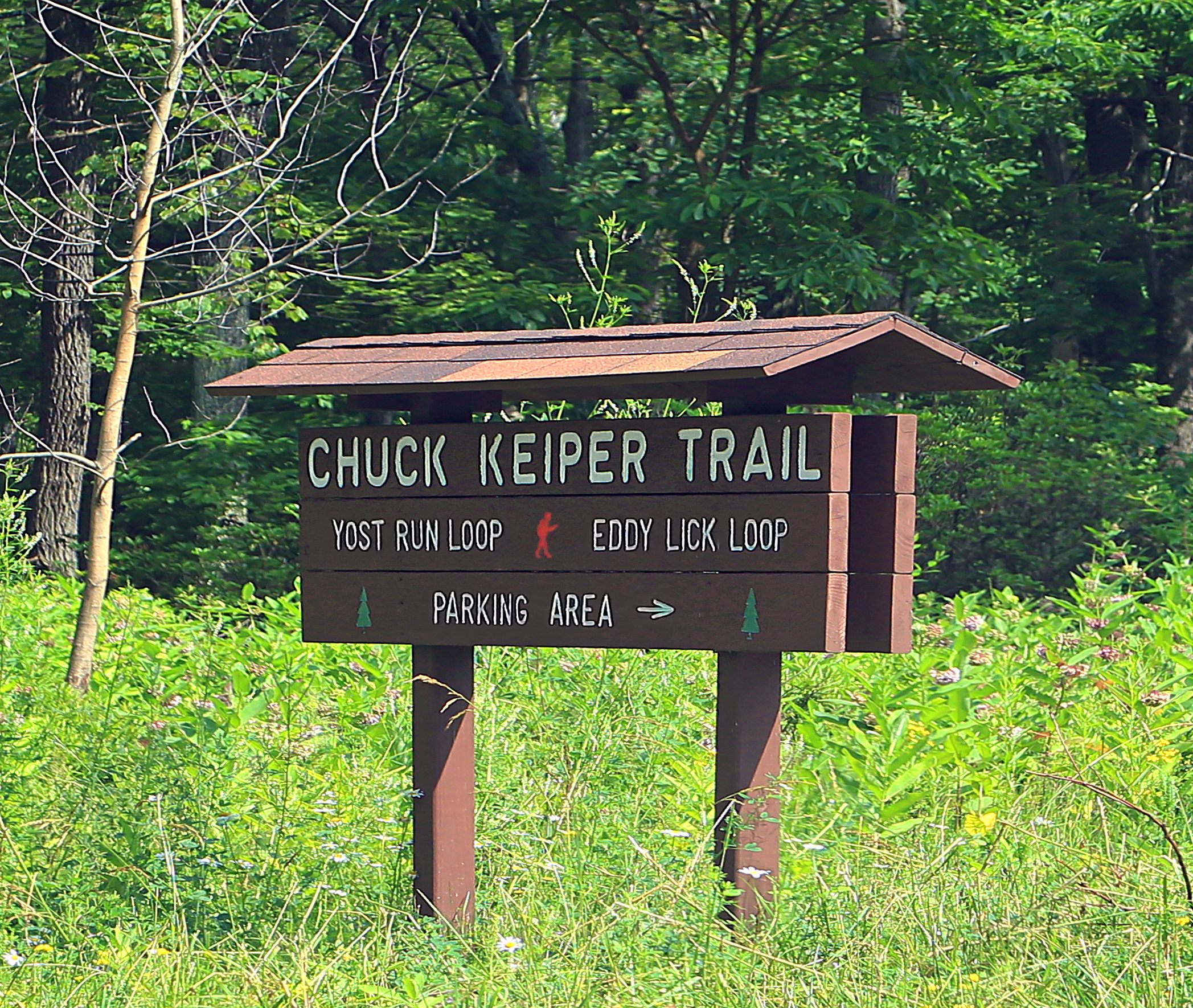
A trailhead sign on PA Route 144.

Soon turning to the north, the main loop continues across high ground until plunging into and climbing out of Clendenin Hollow and then Cranberry Hollow, reaching a junction with a trail that leads into Cranberry Swamp Natural Area at 32.3 miles. After crossing a brief patch of high ground, the trail descends steeply into a vast system of hollows formed by Benjamin Run and its tributaries, with an equally difficult climb back to the top of the plateau. A very narrow ridgetop is reached at a crossing of Grugan Hollow Road (also known as Mill Run Road) at 35.8 miles. The Jack Paulhamus/Garby Trail departs to the east on that road, and eventually crosses the West Branch Susquehanna River and connects with the Donut Hole Trail. The Chuck Keiper Trail begins another difficult descent into a system of hollows formed by several branches of Boggs Run, beginning a walk along that stream at 37.4 miles, followed by yet another steep climb back to the top of the plateau, now trending to the west. After another brief stretch of high ground, the trail descends along a tributary of Hall Run and crosses PA Route 144 again at 42.1 miles. The trail then proceeds parallel to the highway on a sidehill segment, then turns south and climbs alongside a different tributary of Hall Run. At the top, the trail stays on high ground, with the main loop ending at 47.3 miles at the Fish Dam Vista trailhead.

=== Cross-connector ===
The East Branch Trail serves as the cross-connector in the Chuck Keiper Trail system, reaching from the beginning of the main loop (as described above) to the southern segment of the main loop at its 27.9 mile point. From the trailhead parking area at Fish Dam Vista off of PA Route 144, the East Branch Trail initially heads east, roughly parallel to the highway. It then turns to the southeast and enters East Branch Swamp Natural Area at 1.6 miles. The trail then descends gently alongside East Branch Run and reaches the southern segment of the main loop after 3.3 miles.

=== Hiking options ===
The Chuck Keiper Trail system, thanks to the presence of the cross-connector trail, enables several loop options. As described above, a hike on the main loop on its own is 47.3 miles in length. A hike on the west side of the loop, utilizing the cross-connector trail, is 31.2 miles long. A hike on the east side of the loop, utilizing the cross-connector trail, is 22.7 miles long. A "figure-8" hike, which requires completing the cross-connector trail twice, is 53.9 miles long.
