= Cranberry Swamp Natural Area =

Natural area in Pennsylvania

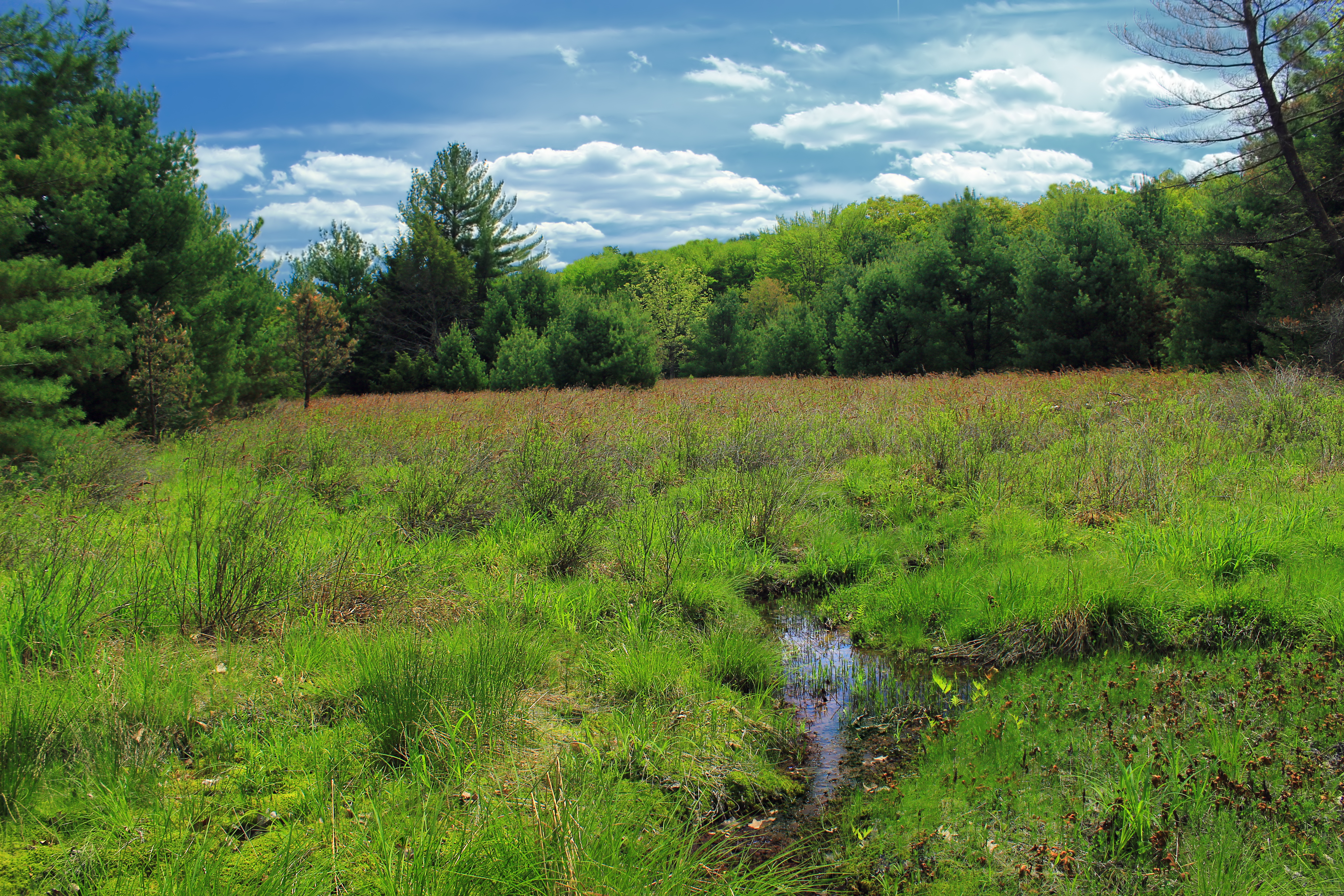

- Location within Pennsylvania
- Location: Clinton County, Pennsylvania
- Nearest town: Renovo
- Coordinates: 41°15′10″N 77°43′28″W
- Area: 144 acres (58 ha)

Cranberry Swamp Natural Area is a 144-acre (58 ha) protected area in Clinton County, Pennsylvania, United States. It is part of Sproul State Forest.

== Description ==
The Natural Area was established to preserve a cranberry bog of a type that is uncommon in Pennsylvania. The landscape was formed in a poorly-drained area between two low ridges, and black bears have been reported in the area. It has also been noted for stands of trees that are uncommon in the region, such as white birch and black cherry. Sphagnum moss and other specialized wetland plants can also be found. The area is skirted by the Chuck Keiper Trail, from which a loop trail departs to walk around the bog.
