= Hyner View State Park =

State park in Pennsylvania, United States

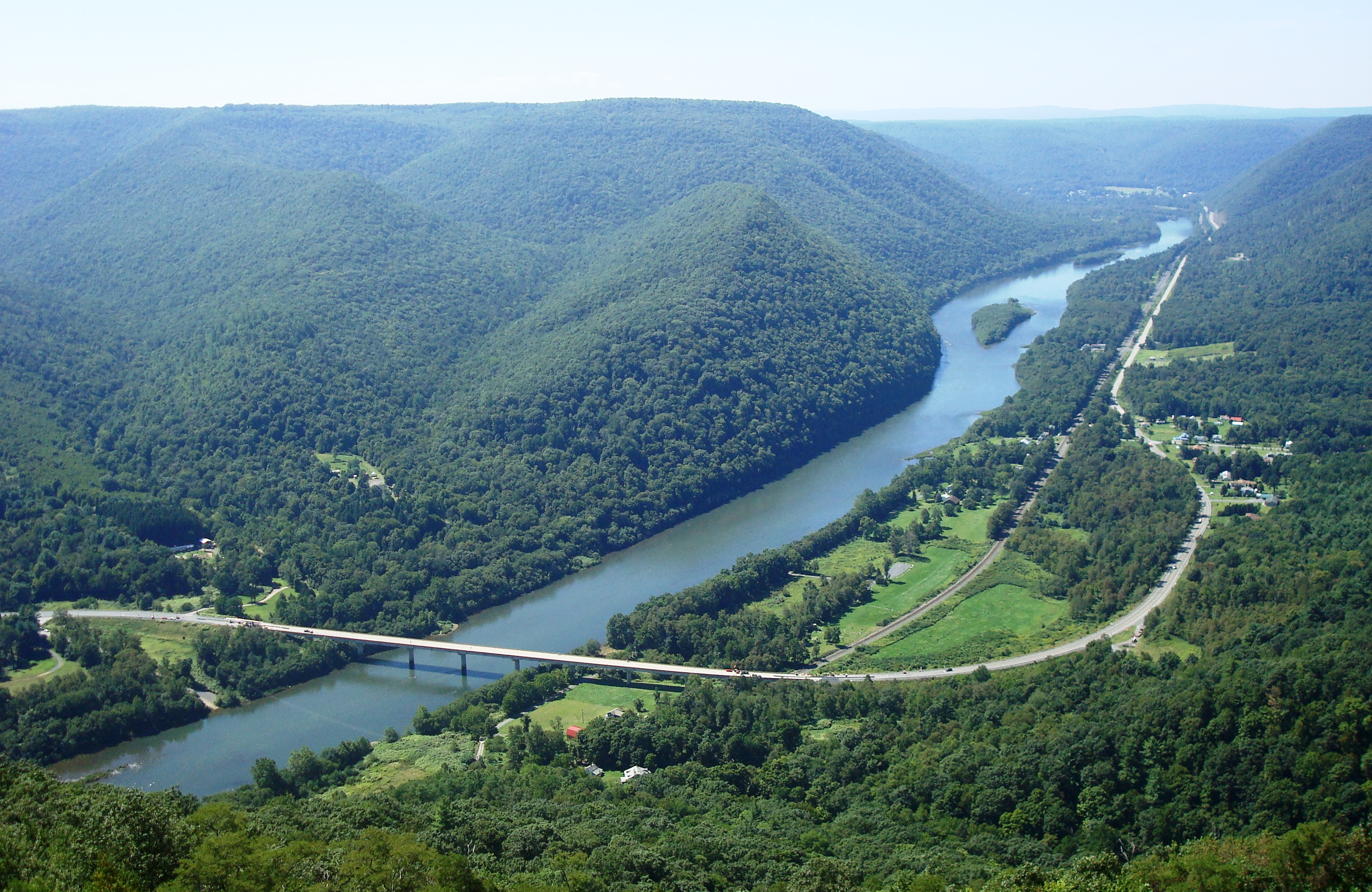
- View of the West Branch Susquehanna River valley, with Pennsylvania State Route 120 (the Bucktail Trail) crossing it, looking west-northwest from Hyner View State Park

- Location within Pennsylvania Location within the United States
- Interactive map of Hyner View State Park
- Location: Chapman Township, Clinton County, Pennsylvania, United States
- Coordinates: 41°19′36″N 77°37′26″W
- Area: 6 acres (2.4 ha)
- Elevation: 1,940 feet (590 m)
- Established: 1965
- Administrator: Pennsylvania Department of Conservation and Natural Resources
- Website: Official website
- Pennsylvania State Parks

Hyner View State Park is a 6-acre (2.4 ha) Pennsylvania state park in Chapman Township, Clinton County, Pennsylvania in the United States. The park is 6 miles (9.7 km) east of Renovo and 3 miles (4.8 km) north of Hyner on Pennsylvania Route 120 (Route 120 here is also known as Bucktail State Park Natural Area). Hyner View State Park is surrounded by Sproul State Forest.

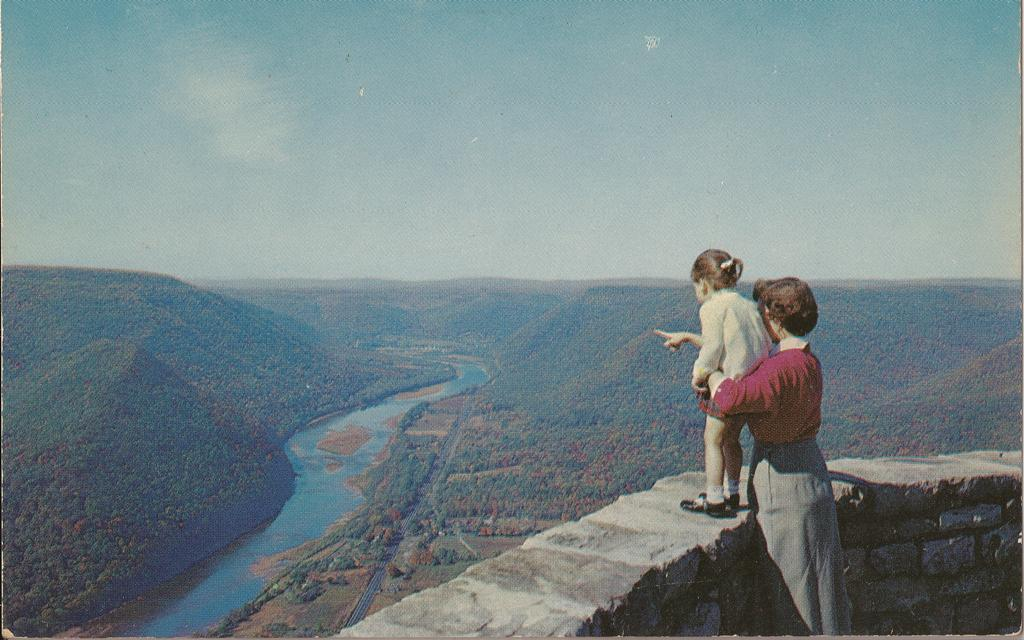
An old post card from Hyner View, circa 1955

Hyner View State Park is 5 miles (8 km) from Hyner Run State Park and is administered from there. The lookout area is bordered by a large stone wall that was built by the Civilian Conservation Corps during the Great Depression. The current access road from Hyner Run State park was built in 1949 (it also connects to a dirt road that leads to Pennsylvania Route 44). After the new access road opened, the first Flaming Fall Foliage Festival was held at the park. It has since outgrown the park and is currently held in nearby Renovo. The park was officially transferred to the Bureau of State Parks in 1965.

The park overlook is at an elevation of 1,940 feet (591 m) above sea level. The West Branch Susquehanna River here is at an elevation of 640 feet (195 m), so the overlook is 1,300 feet (396 m) above the river. Hyner View State Park was chosen by the Pennsylvania Department of Conservation and Natural Resources (DCNR) and its Bureau of Parks as one of "25 Must-See Pennsylvania State Parks".

The park is the location of a scenic lookout and a contains a launching point for hang gliding. Visitors to Hyner View State Park can see the West Branch Susquehanna River for many miles both up and downstream. Hang gliders can be launched from a ramp just below the lookout wall and glide over the river valley. The park has a small picnic area, a parking area, and restrooms.

== Fire Wardens Monument ==
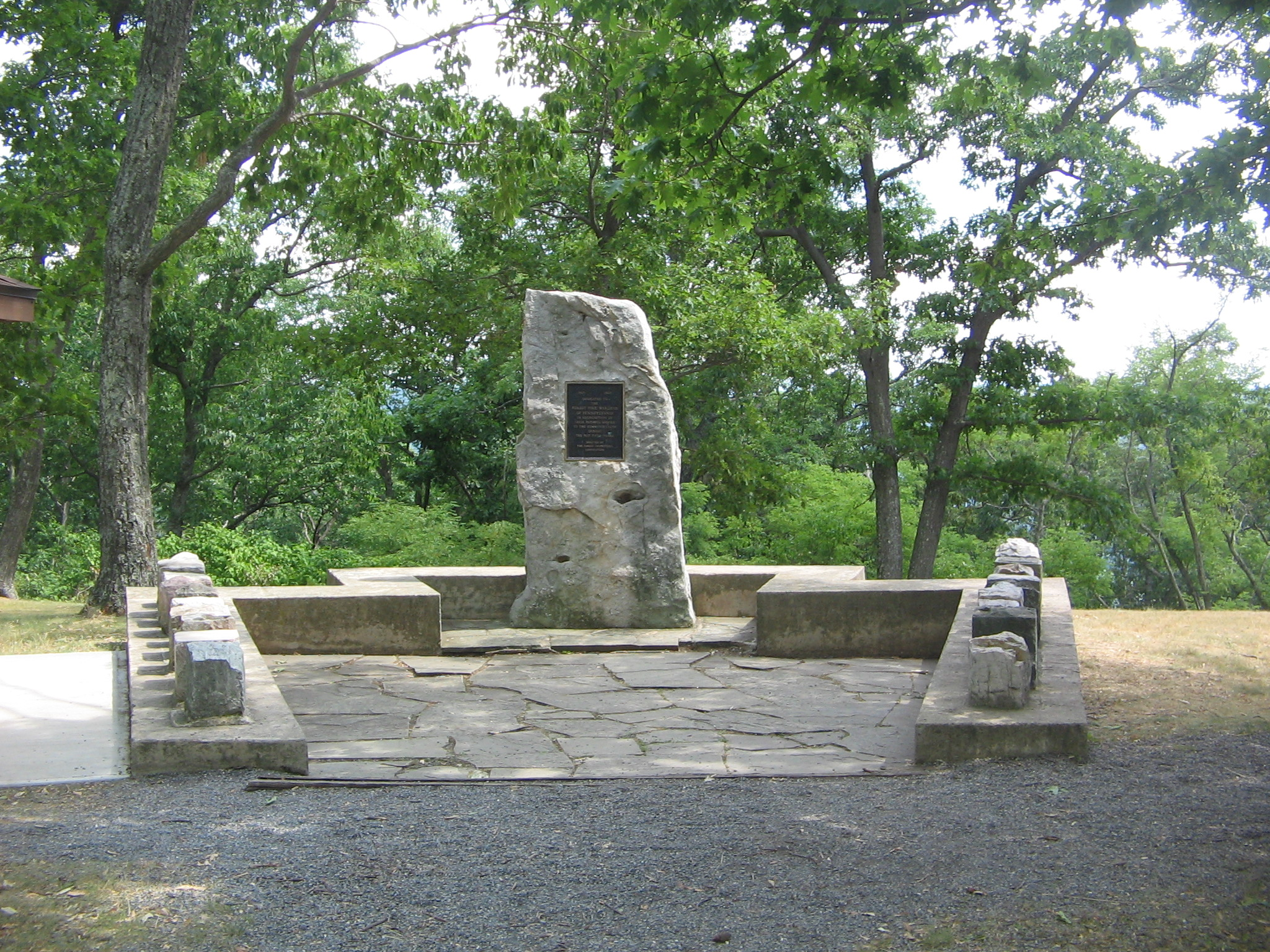
Forest Fire Wardens Monument with stones for each of the twenty state forests at Hyner View.

Hyner View State Park is the site of a monument to the state's forest fire wardens, erected in 1965 by the Forest Inspectors Association. The monument consists of a large monolith with a plaque reading "1915 - 1965 Dedicated to the Forest Fire Wardens of Pennsylvania in recognition of their faithful service to the Commonwealth during the past fifty years".

The monolith is at the head of a low, keystone-shaped concrete wall. On each of the two long sides of the keystone are ten stones, one for each of the twenty state forests in Pennsylvania. Each stone is a rough cube in shape and each was taken from its respective state forest.

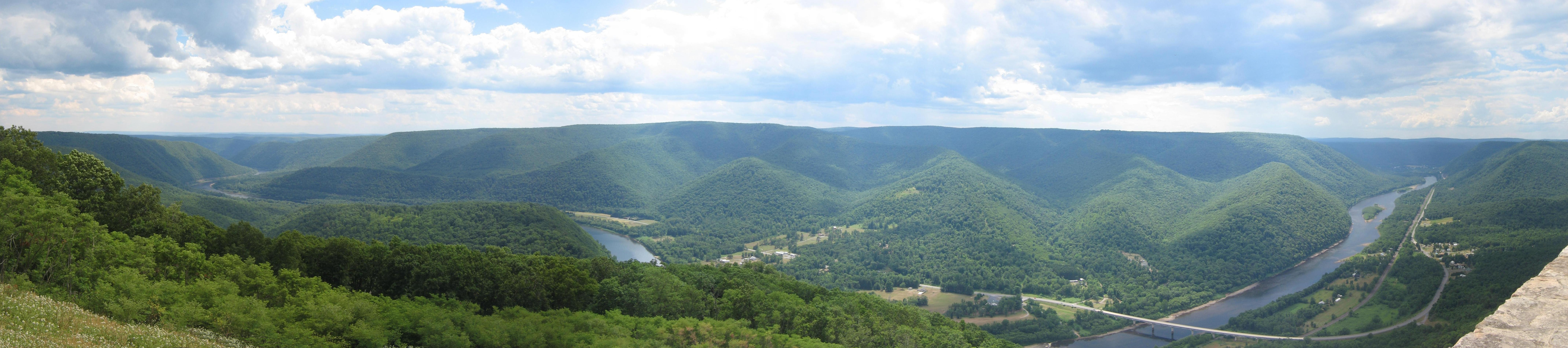
Panoramic View from the CCC wall at Hyner View of the West Branch Susquehanna River valley
