= Jericho, Cameron County, Pennsylvania =

Unincorporated community in Pennsylvania, U.S.

Jericho
- Unincorporated community
- Location within Pennsylvania Location within the United States
- Coordinates: 41°19′19″N 78°04′36″W
- Country: United States of America
- State: Pennsylvania
- County: Cameron County

Jericho is an unincorporated community in Cameron County, in the U.S. state of Pennsylvania.

== History ==
The community was named after the ancient city of Jericho.
