= Young Womans Creek =

Creek in Pennsylvania, United States

Coordinates: 41.35806°N 77.70494°W

Young Womans Creek is an 11.3-mile-long (18.2 km) tributary of the West Branch Susquehanna River in Pennsylvania in the United States.

== Right Branch ==
The northernmost branches of the creek are the County Line Branch and the Dyer Branch, which joins the County Line Branch in the midst of Susquehannock State Forest. The Wilcox Branch has its origins further south, running along the east side of Lecox Ridge in the forest, and emptying into the County Line Branch just south of the Potter County line, in Clinton County. By this time, the converging branches both lie in deep, wooded gorges. The Baldwin Branch rises to the east near the Pump Station Fire Tower and reaches the County Line Branch a little below the last confluence, forming the main stream of the Right Branch. Benson Run discharges into the Baldwin Branch a little above the confluence.

The valley is now somewhat wider, but very steep-sided. Lebo Run empties into it a little further below, and then Laurel Fork. Bull Run enters the creek just before it enters Sproul State Forest and meets McUrquoy Run. Summerson Run and then Shaney Brook also enter it before it leaves the state forest, and, just below, joins the Left Branch to form the main stream.

== Left Branch ==
The Left Branch arises in a natural gas field in Potter County. Flowing southward through Susquehannock State Forest in a deep and narrow gorge, it is joined by Spring Brook and Greenlick Run, and then the Shingle Branch. Hollows made by smaller streams appear along both sides of the canyon.

The Osborne Branch arises to the west of the Left Branch in the gas field, and is soon joined by the small Scout Branch, rising further to the west, and then by the westernmost Porter Branch to form the Shingle Branch and enter Sproul State Forest. The Shingle Branch is at first somewhat crooked and marked by hollows, but the lower part of its course is straight and steep to the junction with the Left Branch.

South of the confluence, Mudlick Run is the last named tributary before the Left Branch exits the State Forest and joins the Right Branch.

== Main Stream Young Woman's Creek ==
The main stream runs along the west side of Summerson Mountain through Gleasonton and North Bend before joining the West Branch Susquehanna River just downstream of Renovo.

== History ==
The watershed is largely uninhabited, and is heavily forested by pine and hemlock. The Mensch & Lowenstein partnership ran a narrow gauge logging railroad three or four miles up the Right Branch from Gleasonton to supply their sawmill there, 1872–1878.

From 1893–1903, the North Bend and Kettle Creek Railroad (standard gauge) had extensive logging operations on both branches, and the Slate Run Railroad (3-foot gauge) operated on the upper part of the County Line Branch for some time between 1886–1910.

== See also ==
- List of rivers of Pennsylvania
- Drury Run
