= Hyner Run State Park =

State Park in Pennsylvania, United States

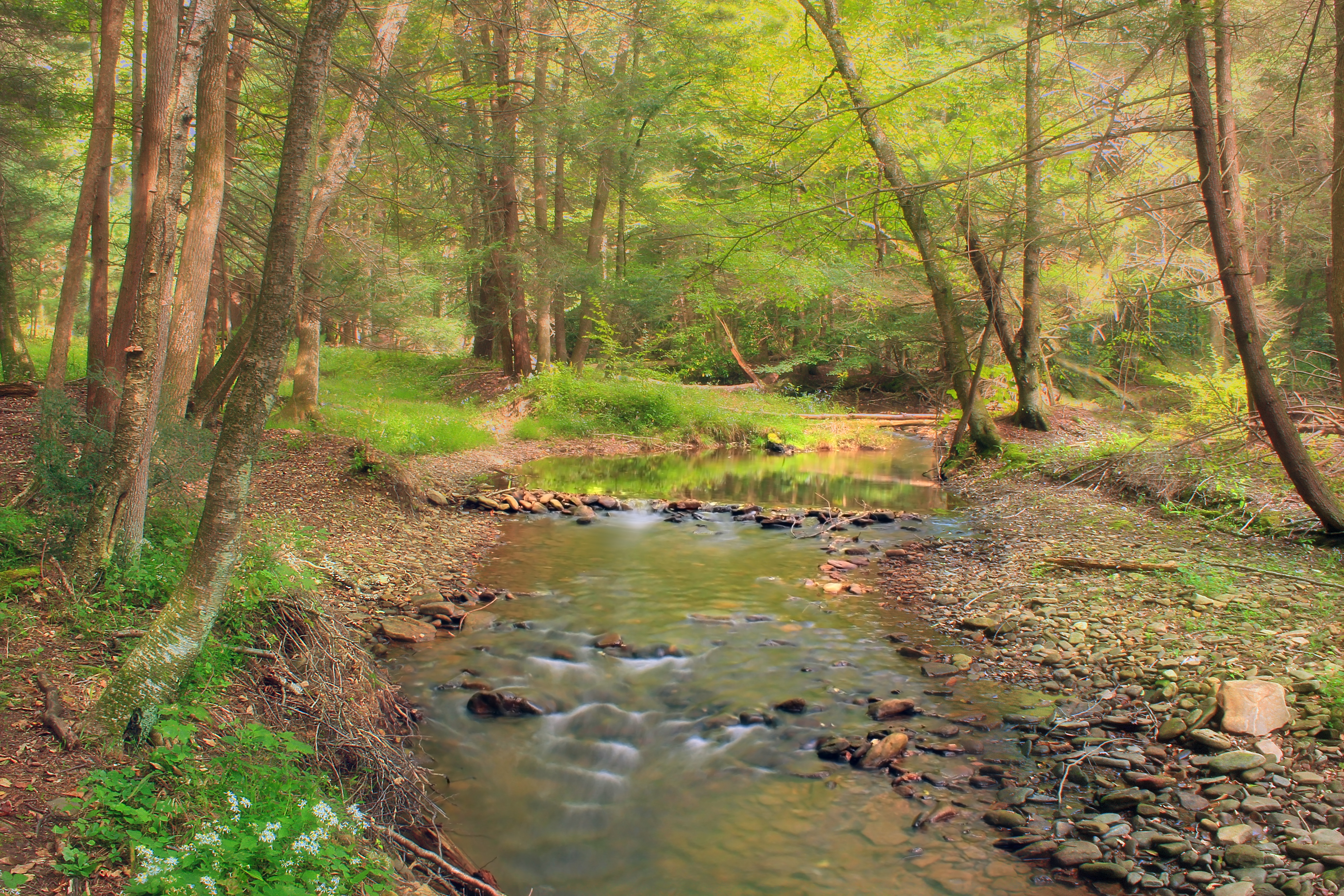
- Hyner Run within the park

- Location within Pennsylvania Location within the United States
- Interactive map of Hyner Run State Park
- Location: Chapman Township, Clinton County, Pennsylvania, United States
- Coordinates: 41°21′30″N 77°37′41″W
- Area: 180 acres (73 ha)
- Elevation: 1,010 feet (310 m)
- Established: 1958
- Administrator: Pennsylvania Department of Conservation and Natural Resources
- Website: Official website
- Pennsylvania State Parks

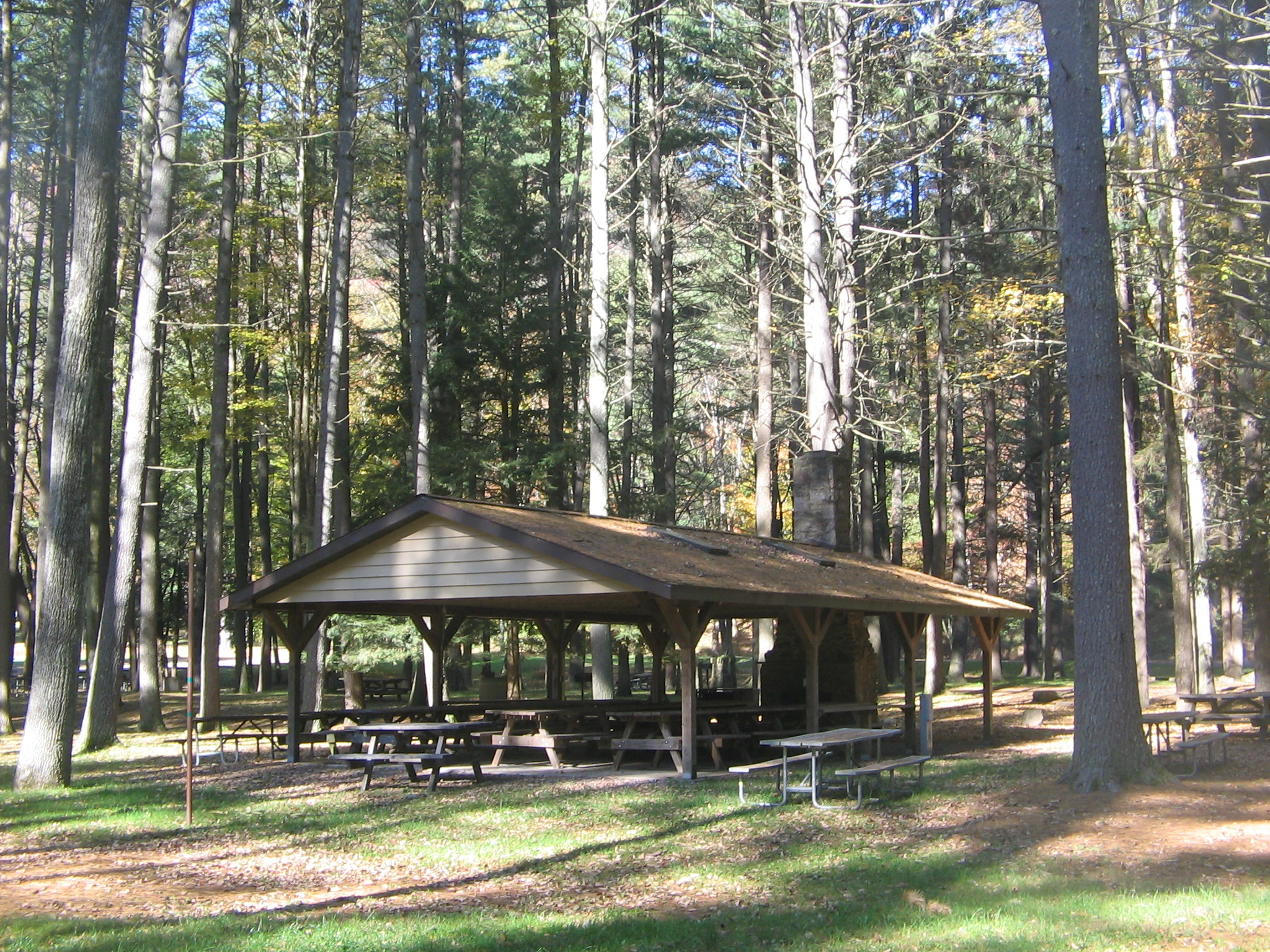

Hyner Run State Park is a 180-acre (73 ha) Pennsylvania state park in Chapman Township, Clinton County, Pennsylvania in the United States. The park is 6 miles (9.7 km) east of Renovo and 3 miles (5 km) north of Hyner on Pennsylvania Route 120 (Route 120 here is also known as Bucktail State Park Natural Area). Hyner Run State Park is surrounded by Sproul State Forest.

== History ==
Hyner Run State Park was the site of a Civilian Conservation Corps camp (Camp S-75-PA). The CCC provided work for the unemployed young men of the Great Depression. Camp S-75-PA was one of many such camps spread throughout Pennsylvania. The young men of CCC Company 310 worked to clear the regrowing forests of brush to prevent forest fires. They also constructed roads throughout the forests, built state park facilities, constructed bridges on the state roads, planted trees for reforestation, and cleaned streams. Camp S-75-PA was built by the men in the summer, fall and winter of 1933. The camp was in such a remote area that electricity was not available. Later, a generating plant was installed to provide the camp with electricity and a 4,000 US gallons (15,000 L; 3,300 imp gal) reservoir was built to supply the camp's water needs. Much of the camp was destroyed by the extensive flooding of the West Branch Susquehanna River in 1936, but some traces remain as a reminder of the days of Camp S-75-PA.

Hyner Run State Park was opened to the public in 1958. It originally included a swimming pool and bathhouse. As well as a concession area, picnic facilities and restrooms. The camping area was opened in 1975.

== Recreation ==
=== Fishing and hunting ===
Hyner Run is stocked annually by the Pennsylvania Fish and Boat Commission with brook and brown trout. The upper parts of Hyner Run and other small streams have a population of native brook trout. Fly fishing is possible in the Right Branch of Young Womans Creek.

Hunting and trapping are permitted on about 20 acres (8.1 ha) of Hyner Run State Park. Hunters are expected to follow the rules and regulations of the Pennsylvania Game Commission. The common game species are ruffed grouse, squirrels, turkey, white-tailed deer, and black bears. Common fur bearers are bobcat, raccoon, red and gray fox, and coyote. The hunting of groundhogs is not permitted at the park. Many more acres of forested woodlands are available for hunting and trapping on the grounds of the adjacent Sproul State Forest.

=== Camping ===
A modern cabin that sleeps eight people is available for rent year-round. The two-story house has three bedrooms, two bathrooms, kitchen, dining room, living room and roofed, open front porch. Renters provide their own sheets, blankets and towels. Kitchenware and eating utensils are provided. In the yard of the cabin is a fire ring, charcoal grill, two picnic tables and a swing set.

The camping area is open the second week in April and closes in mid-December, unless posted otherwise. Each of the 30 campsites has a level pad, picnic table and fire ring. The campground has showers, flush toilets and several water outlets. Garbage and recycling receptacles and a sanitary dump station are near the campground entrance. Pets are prohibited in the campground.

=== Swimming, hiking and picnicking ===
A large swimming pool is open from Memorial Day weekend to Labor Day weekend. The park serves as a trailhead for the Donut Hole Trail system in Sproul State Forest. There are 150 picnic tables in the 7-acre (28,000 m^{2}) picnic area with two pavilions.

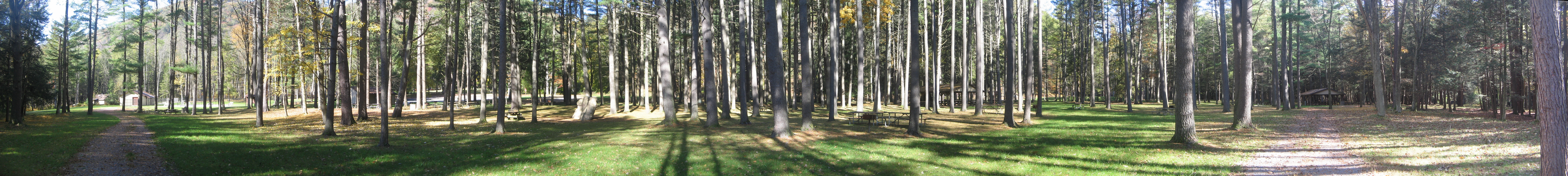
Panoramic view of Hyner Run State Park with swimming pool at left, picnic shelters 1 and 2 at right.
