= Sproul State Forest =

State forest in Pennsylvania, United States

- IUCN category VI (protected area with sustainable use of natural resources)
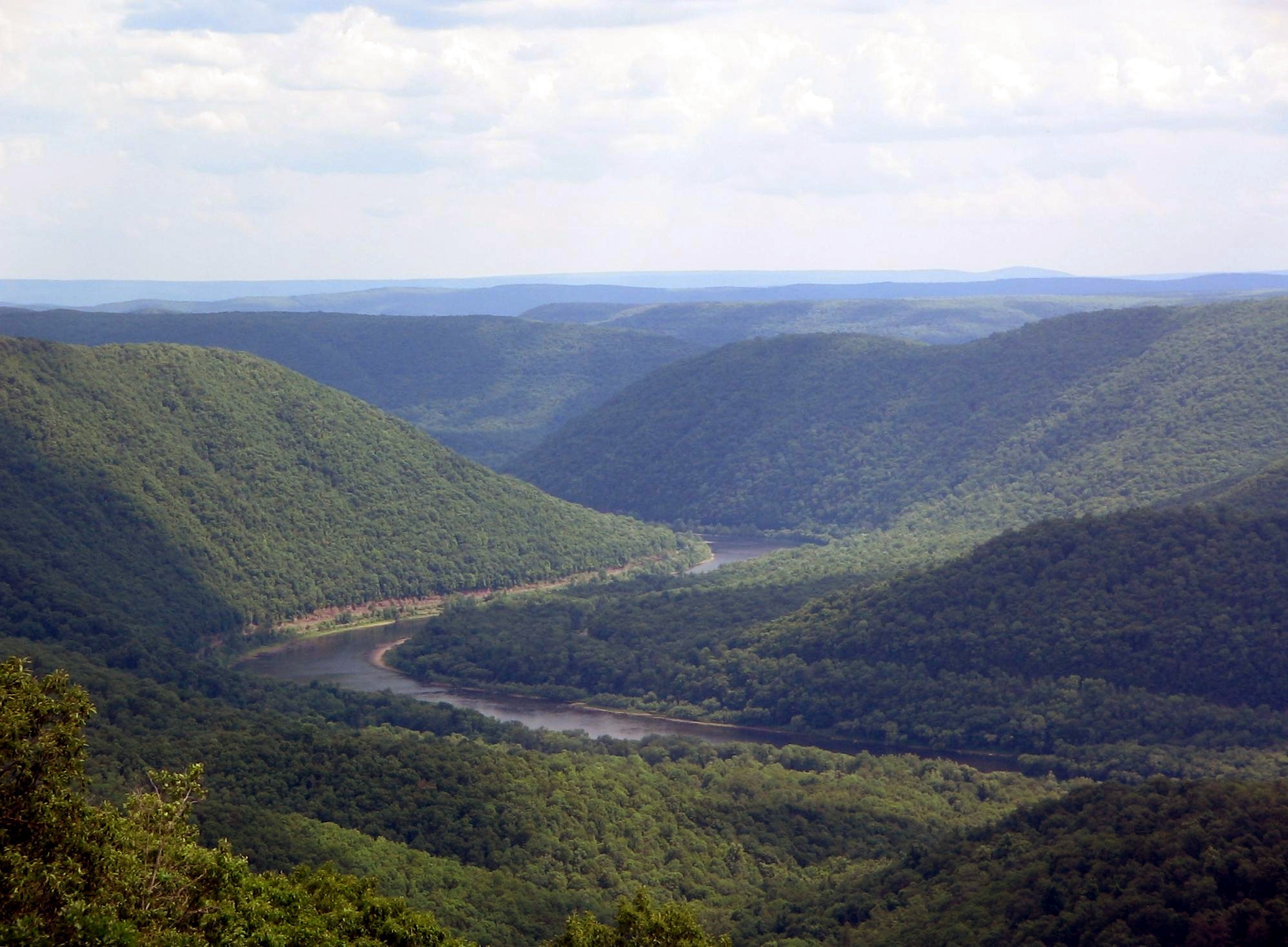
- View of the West Branch Susquehanna River valley and Sproul State Forest, looking east from Hyner View State Park.

- Location within Pennsylvania
- Location: Pennsylvania, United States
- Coordinates: 41°19′40″N 77°44′58″W
- Area: 280,000 acres (1,100 km^{2})
- Established: 1898
- Governing body: Pennsylvania Department of Conservation and Natural Resources
- Website: Sproul State Forest

Sproul State Forest is a Pennsylvania state forest in Pennsylvania Bureau of Forestry District #10. The main offices are located in Renovo, Pennsylvania in Clinton County in the United States.

The forest is located in western Clinton County and northern Centre County and contains 280,000 acres (113,310 ha) of land. It also includes several tracts in Potter, Cameron County, and Lycoming Counties. Its forests are part of the Allegheny Highlands forests ecoregion. It was named for former Pennsylvania governor William C. Sproul (in office from 1919 to 1923).

The first land for what became Sproul State Forest was purchased in 1898. This was also the first land purchased by the Commonwealth of Pennsylvania for what are now the twenty Pennsylvania State Forests, with over two million acres (810,000 ha) of forest.

== History ==
The Sproul State Forest was named in memory of William C. Sproul, Governor of Pennsylvania from 1919 to 1923. Sproul State Forest was formed as a direct result of the depletion of the forests of Pennsylvania that took place during the mid-to-late 19th century. Conservationists like Dr. Joseph Rothrock became concerned that the forests would not regrow if they were not managed properly. Lumber and iron companies had harvested the old-growth forests for various reasons. They clear cut the forests and left behind nothing but dried tree tops and rotting stumps. The sparks of passing steam locomotives ignited wildfires that prevented the formation of second growth forests. The conservationists feared that the forest would never regrow if there was not a change in the philosophy of forest management. They called for the state to purchase land from the lumber and iron companies and the lumber and iron companies were more than willing to sell their land since that had depleted the natural resources of the forests. The changes began to take place in 1895 when Dr. Rothrock was appointed the first commissioner of the Pennsylvania Department of Forests and Waters, the forerunner of today's Pennsylvania Department of Conservation and Natural Resources. The Pennsylvania General Assembly passed a piece of legislation in 1897 that authorized the purchase of "unseated lands for forest reservations". This was the beginning of the State Forest system.

== Trails ==
Hiking -- Two hiking trails systems designated as State Forest Trails are located within the Sproul State Forest. The Chuck Keiper Trail is a 50-mile (80 km) double looped system which includes trails in the Fish Dam Wild Area and Burns Run Wild Area. The Chuck Keiper Trail is marked with orange paint blazes.

The Donut Hole Trail is approximately 90 miles (140 km) in length and connects with the Susquehannock Trail System. The trail traverses Kettle Creek Park and terminates at Hyner Run State Park. The Donut Hole Trail is marked with orange paint blazes.

The Eagleton Mine Camp Trail, EMCT, is around a 20-mile loop that has an inter connector. The trail is marked in red. The map is found here

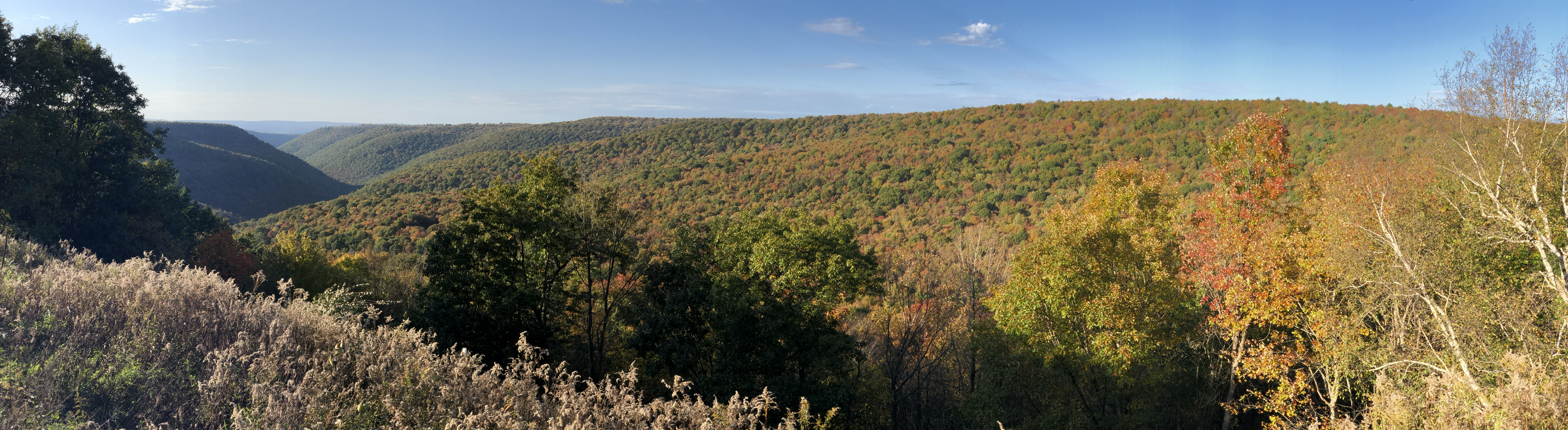
Sproul State Forest viewed from PA 144 in Noyes Township, Clinton County

There are numerous other foot trails which were originally built for fire access which provide good hiking into most parts of the Sproul State Forest. These trails are not marked or maintained. When hiking in the Sproul State forest persons should dress for the weather and use map and compass

Equestrian Use -- An Equestrian Trail located near Kettle Creek State Park is a 15-mile (24 km) loop. The Eagleton Mine Camp Trail, a multi-use trail, offers a 20-mile (32 km) loop through several historical locations in the area. Additionally with the exception of designated hiking trails and municipal watersheds, horseback riders may utilized the old woods roads and State Forest Road system. Trail maps are available by contacting the Sproul district office.

Mountain Biking -- All trails within the Sproul State Forest are open to mountain biking, with the exception of the Donut Hole Trail and the Chuck Keiper Trail. Most trails are kept clear over the summer, but some do become overgrown. It is recommended you contact the district office to find out which trails are better for riding. The Eagleton Mine Camp Trail offers excellent biking. Many sections are narrow, steep and rocky. The northern section is not as technical as the southern loop.

Cross-country Skiing -- Hiking Bear Ski Trail is located on Hyner Mountain and traverses 14 miles (23 km). The trail covers diverse terrain providing opportunities for both novice and experienced skiers.

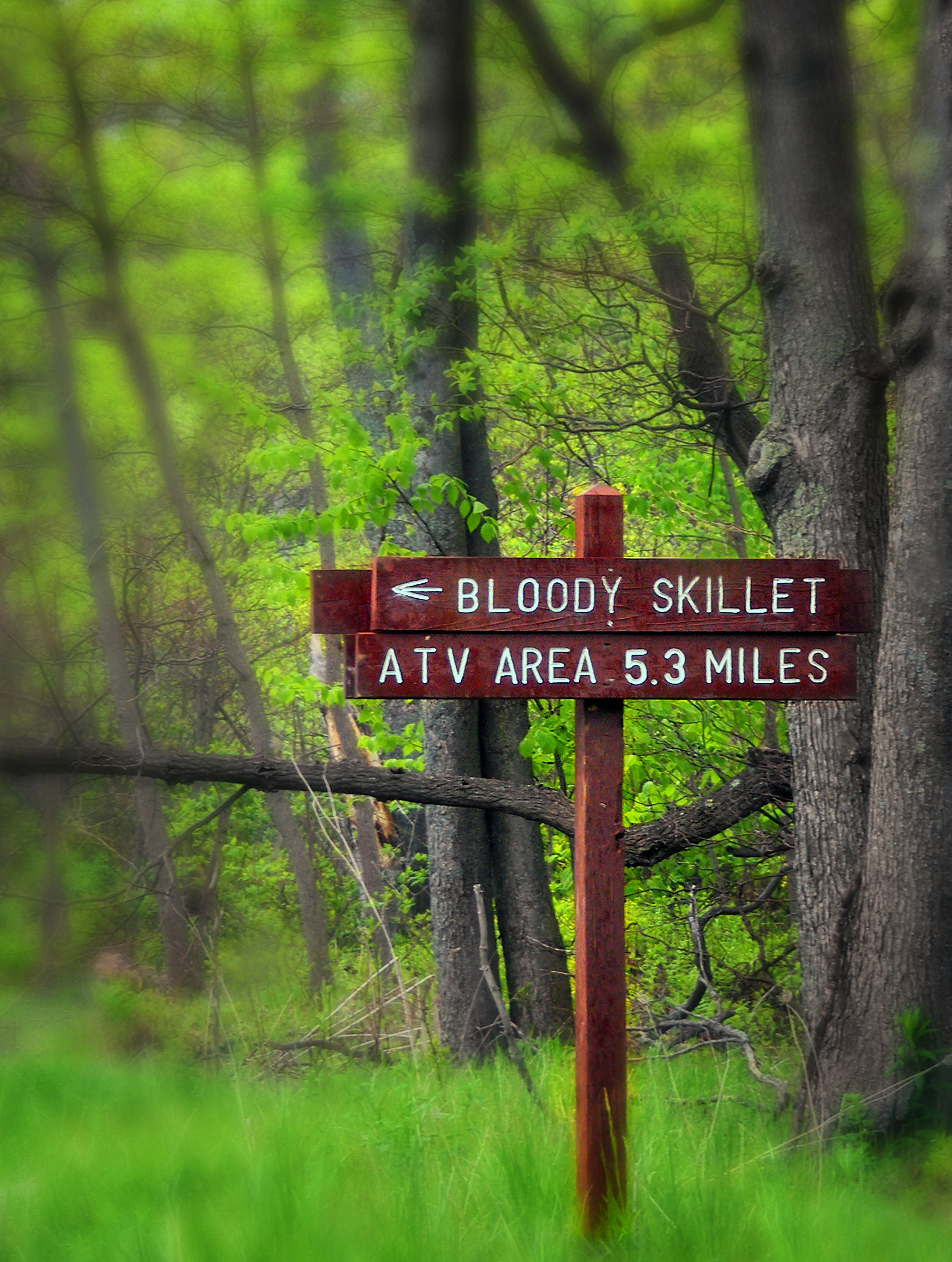
Bloody Skillet ATV area

Snowmobiling -- Snowmobile Trails are available for use when snow conditions permit. The Hyner Mountain Trail system is marked and groomed. Also, many State Forest Roads are open for joint use of snowmobiles and licensed motorized vehicles.

All Terrain Vehicles -- There is one area in the Sproul State Forest open to All Terrain Vehicles use. The area is located near the Huling Branch of Two Mile Run and consists of old woods roads, old coal mining roads, and unreclaimed surface mining areas. All the rest of Sproul State Forest is closed to All Terrain Vehicle use.

== Fishing and Hunting ==
Fishing -

There are over 400 miles (640 km) of freestone cold water streams within the Sproul State Forest. Included in this total are 12 streams where water quality and native trout populations are such that these streams are classified as Wilderness Trout Streams.

Hunting -

Black bear, whitetail dear, and wild turkey habitat is abundant, and these species are found in good numbers throughout the Sproul State forest.

== Other Recreation ==
Hang Gliding -

Hyner View State Park offers seasonal hang gliding opportunities for recreation. Hang gliders take off from the vista and sail out over the West Branch of the Susquehanna River.

== Neighboring state forest districts ==
- Susquehannock State Forest to the north
- Tiadaghton State Forest to the east
- Bald Eagle State Forest to the southeast
- Rothrock State Forest to the south
- Moshannon State Forest to the southwest
- Elk State Forest to the west

== Nearby state parks ==
- Bucktail State Park Natural Area
- Kettle Creek State Park
- Hyner Run State Park
- Hyner View State Park
- Bald Eagle State Park

== Natural and wild areas ==
- Cranberry Swamp Natural Area
- East Branch Swamp Natural Area
- Tamarack Swamp Natural Area
- Burns Run Wild Area
- Russell P. Letterman Wild Area

== See also ==
- Project Ketch, a proposal to develop a location in Sproul State Forest as a natural gas storage facility, using nuclear explosives
