= List of Pennsylvania state forest natural areas =

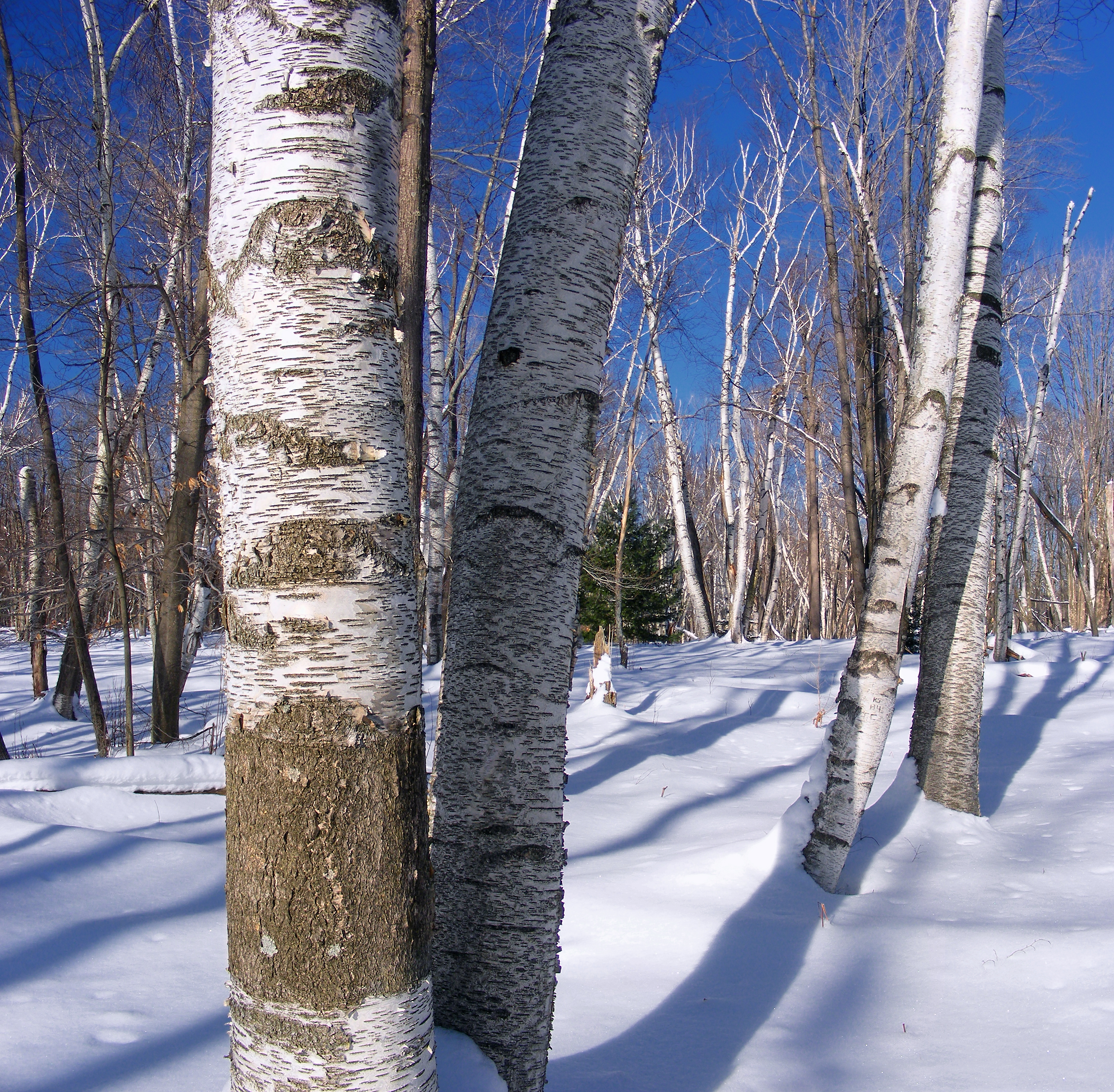
A stand of white birch trees in Marion Brooks Natural Area, an example of the types of ecosystem protected by the Commonwealth

The Commonwealth of Pennsylvania in the United States includes 58 natural areas in its State Forest system. They are managed by the Pennsylvania Bureau of Forestry, a division of the Pennsylvania Department of Conservation and Natural Resources.

The Commonwealth describes a natural area as a location with "scenic, historic, geologic or ecological significance, which will remain in an undisturbed state, with development and maintenance being limited to that required for health and safety. Natural areas are set aside to provide locations for scientific observation of natural systems, to protect examples of typical and unique plant and animal communities, and to protect outstanding examples of natural interest and beauty." Many such areas are only accessible on foot, and several do not have any maintained hiking trails.

This list does not include additional natural areas that are protected within the Pennsylvania State Park system.

Natural area name	State forest	County	Area	Date founded	Remarks
Alan Seeger Natural Area	Rothrock	Huntingdon	390 acres (158 ha)	1921	Named after the poet who died during World War I. Includes old growth forest remnants.
Algerine Swamp Natural Area	Tiadaghton	Lycoming, Tioga	84 acres (34 ha)		Includes a glacial bog.
Anders Run Natural Area	Cornplanter	Warren	96 acres (39 ha)	1987	Includes a stone house built in 1841.
Bark Cabin Natural Area	Tiadaghton	Lycoming	7 acres (3 ha)		Traversed by the Mid State Trail; features old growth hemlocks.
Bear Meadows Natural Area	Rothrock	Centre	890 acres (360 ha)	1965	Also a National Natural Landmark.
Bear Run Natural Area	Bald Eagle	Centre	32 acres (13 ha)		
Beartown Woods Natural Area	Michaux	Franklin	27 acres (11 ha)		Accessible via the Appalachian Trail.
Big Flat Laurel Natural Area	Rothrock	Centre, Huntingdon	184 acres (74 ha)		
Black Ash Swamp Natural Area	Tioga	Tioga	308 acres (125 ha)		
Bruce Lake Natural Area	Delaware	Pike	2,845 acres (1,151 ha)		Includes both a natural glacial lake and a man-made lake.
Buckhorn Natural Area	Delaware	Pike	535 acres (217 ha)		Also a designated Reptile and Amphibian Protection Area.
Carbaugh Run Natural Area	Michaux	Adams	780 acres (316 ha)		Also a designated Reptile and Amphibian Protection Area, and founded to protect Native American archeological sites.
Charles F. Lewis Natural Area	Gallitzin	Indiana	384 acres (155 ha)		Named after an area journalist and conservationist.
Cranberry Swamp Natural Area	Sproul	Clinton	144 acres (58 ha)		Encompasses a boreal swamp.
David R. Johnson Natural Area	William Penn	Bucks	56 acres (23 ha)		Named for its former landowner.
Detweiler Run Natural Area	Rothrock	Huntingdon	463 acres (187 ha)		Also a designated Important Bird Area.
Devil's Elbow Natural Area	Loyalsock	Lycoming	404 acres (163 ha)		Protects a population of pitcher plants.
East Branch Swamp Natural Area	Sproul	Clinton	186 acres (75 ha)		
Forrest H. Dutlinger Natural Area	Susquehannock	Clinton	1,521 acres (616 ha)		Named after an early Commonwealth forester; includes old growth forest remnants.
Frank E. Masland Jr. Natural Area	Tuscarora	Perry	1,270 acres (514 ha)		Also a designated Reptile and Amphibian Protection Area.
Halfway Run Natural Area	Bald Eagle	Union	407 acres (165 ha)		
Hemlocks Natural Area	Tuscarora	Perry	120 acres (49 ha)		
The Hook Natural Area	Bald Eagle	Union	5,119 acres (2,072 ha)		Encompasses an entire regional watershed.
Hoverter and Sholl Box Huckleberry Natural Area	Tuscarora	Perry	10 acres (4 ha)	1967	Features a rare box huckleberry colony believed to be more than 1,300 years old.
Jakey Hollow Natural Area	Weiser	Columbia	59 acres (24 ha)	1990	
Johnson Run Natural Area	Elk	Cameron	216 acres (87 ha)		
Joyce Kilmer Natural Area	Bald Eagle	Union	77 acres (31 ha)	1921	Named after the poet and naturalist.
Kettle Creek Gorge Natural Area	Loyalsock	Sullivan	774 acres (313 ha)	1970	Traversed by the Loyalsock Trail.
Lebo Red Pine Natural Area	Tiadaghton	Lycoming	124 acres (50 ha)		Encompasses an uncommon (for Pennsylvania) unplanted grove of red pines.
Little Juniata Natural Area	Rothrock	Huntingdon	624 acres (253 ha)		
Little Mud Pond Swamp Natural Area	Delaware	Pike	182 acres (74 ha)		Encompasses a boreal swamp.
Little Tinicum Island Natural Area	William Penn	Delaware	80 acres (32 ha)		An island in the Delaware River.
Lower Jerry Run Natural Area	Elk	Cameron	892 acres (361 ha)		
Marion Brooks Natural Area	Moshannon	Elk	975 acres (395 ha)		Named after an area conservationist. Includes one of the largest known stands of white birch trees in the eastern United States.
Meeting of the Pines Natural Area	Michaux	Franklin	611 acres (247 ha)	1974	Adjacent to the Penn State Mont Alto campus.
Miller Run Natural Area	Tiadaghton	Lycoming	4,992 acres (2,020 ha)		
M.K. Goddard/Wykoff Run Natural Area	Elk	Cameron	1,215 acres (492 ha)	1965	Features industrial ruins from nuclear research in the 1950s-60s. Partially renamed in the 2010s as a tribute to Maurice K. Goddard.
Mount Cydonia Ponds Natural Area	Michaux	Franklin	183 acres (74 ha)		Encompasses about 60 vernal ponds.
Mount Davis Natural Area	Forbes	Somerset	581 acres (235 ha)		Includes the highest point in Pennsylvania.
Mount Logan Natural Area	Bald Eagle	Clinton	512 acres (207 ha)		Also a designated Reptile and Amphibian Protection Area.
Pennel Run Natural Area	Delaware	Pike	936 acres (379 ha)		
Pine Creek Gorge Natural Area	Tioga	Tioga	12,163 acres (4,922 ha)		Also a National Natural Landmark; largest of the State Forest Natural Areas. Traversed by the West Rim Trail and Pine Creek Rail Trail.
Pine Lake Natural Area	Delaware	Pike	67 acres (27 ha)		
Pine Ridge Natural Area	Buchanan	Bedford	568 acres (230 ha)	1970	Features reclaimed farms and resettlement lands.
Pine Tree Trail Natural Area	Elk	Elk	276 acres (112 ha)		Named after an interpretative trail featuring educational exhibits.
Reynolds Spring Natural Area	Tioga	Lycoming, Tioga	1,302 acres (527 ha)		
Roaring Run Natural Area	Forbes	Westmoreland	3,582 acres (1,450 ha)	1975	
Rocky Ridge Natural Area	Rothrock	Huntingdon	150 acres (61 ha)		
Rosecrans Bog Natural Area	Bald Eagle	Clinton	152 acres (62 ha)		
Ruth Zimmerman Natural Area	William Penn	Berks	33 acres (13 ha)		Named after its former landowner; consists of two tracts.
Sheets Island Archipelago Natural Area	Weiser	Dauphin	70 acres (28 ha)		A series of islands in the Susquehanna River.
Snyder-Middleswarth Natural Area	Bald Eagle	Snyder	500 acres (202 ha)	1921	Includes old growth forest that was scheduled to be logged in 1902.
Spruce Swamp Natural Area	Pinchot	Lackawanna	87 acres (35 ha)		Includes a glacial bog.
Stillwater Natural Area	Delaware	Pike	1,931 acres (781 ha)		Traversed by the Thunder Swamp Trail. Originated as a sanctuary for Civil War deserters.
Sweet Root Natural Area	Buchanan	Bedford	1,526 acres (618 ha)		Includes old-growth hemlocks demonstrating woolly adelgid damage.
Tall Timbers Natural Area	Bald Eagle	Snyder	660 acres (267 ha)		
Tamarack Run Natural Area	Loyalsock	Sullivan	234 acres (95 ha)		
Tamarack Swamp Natural Area	Sproul	Clinton	267 acres (108 ha)	1998	Includes a boreal bog.
Torbert Island Natural Area	Tiadaghton	Lycoming	18 acres (7 ha)		A large island and smaller nearby islands in Pine Creek.

== See also ==
- List of Pennsylvania state forests
- List of Pennsylvania state forest wild areas
