= List of Pennsylvania state forest wild areas =

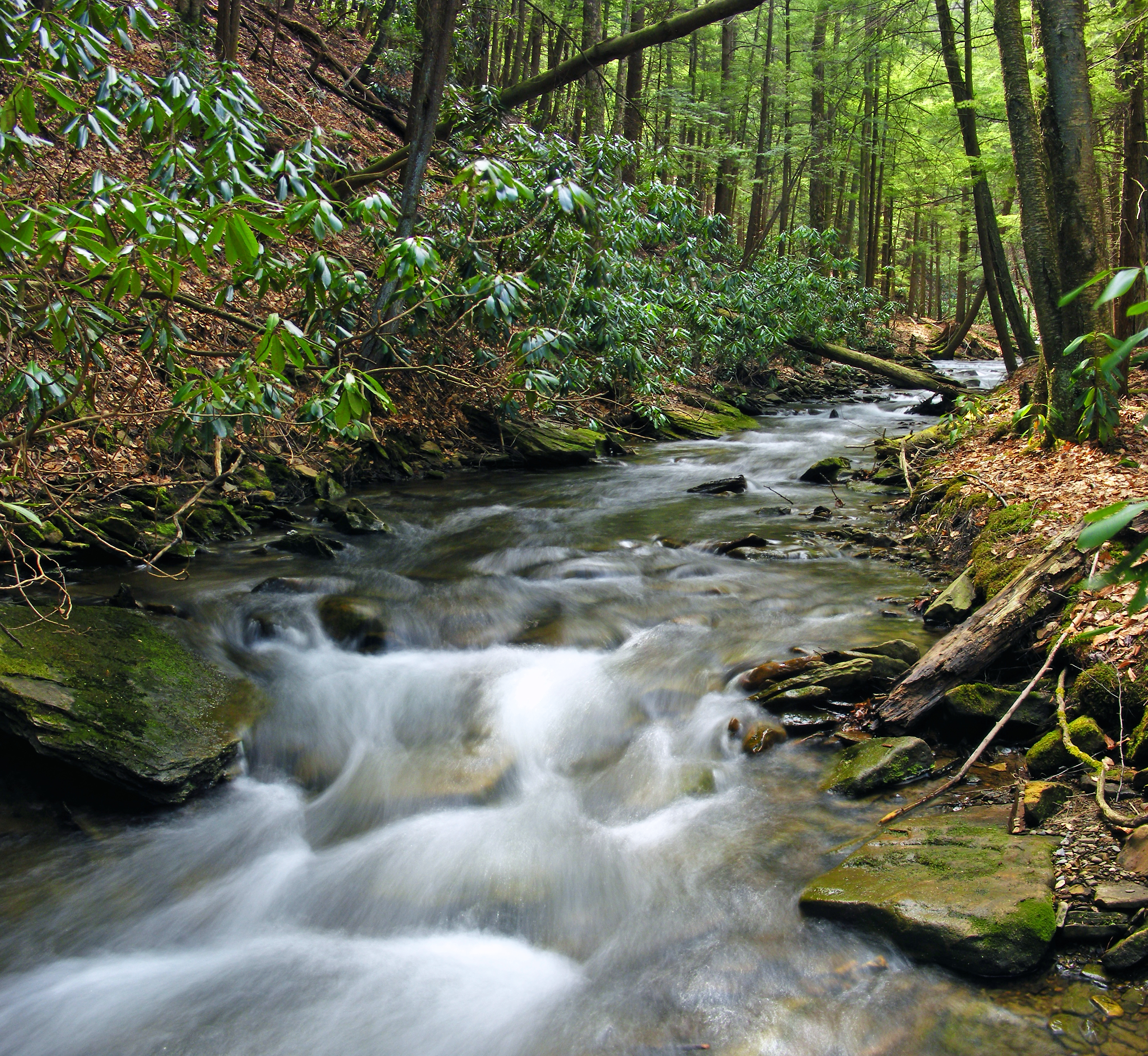
Wykoff Run in Quehanna Wild Area, the largest such protected area in Pennsylvania

The Commonwealth of Pennsylvania in the United States includes 18 wild areas in its State Forest system. They are managed by the Pennsylvania Bureau of Forestry, a division of the Pennsylvania Department of Conservation and Natural Resources.

The Commonwealth describes a wild area as "land where development or disturbance of permanent nature will be prohibited, thereby preserving the wild character of the area" and "an extensive area which the general public will be permitted to see, use and enjoy for such activities as hiking, hunting, fishing, and the pursuit of peace and solitude."

Wild area name	State forest	County	Area	Date founded	Remarks
Algerine Wild Area	Tiadaghton	Lycoming	4,177 acres (1,690 ha)		Traversed by the Black Forest Trail.
Asaph Wild Area	Tioga	Tioga	2,070 acres (838 ha)		
Burns Run Wild Area	Sproul	Clinton	2,408 acres (974 ha)		Traversed by the Chuck Keiper Trail.
Clear Shade Wild Area	Gallitzin	Somerset	2,791 acres (1,129 ha)		Traversed by the John P. Saylor Trail.
Hammersley Wild Area	Susquehannock	Clinton, Potter	30,253 acres (12,243 ha)	2004	Largest area without a road in Pennsylvania.
James C. Nelson Wild Area	Tuscarora	Juniata, Perry	5,345 acres (2,163 ha)		Forest last cut between 1902 and 1917.
Kettle Creek Wild Area	Loyalsock	Sullivan	2,600 acres (1,100 ha)		
Martin Hill Wild Area	Buchanan	Bedford	11,676 acres (4,725 ha)		
McIntyre Wild Area	Loyalsock	Lycoming	7,500 acres (3,035 ha)		Includes remnants of a ghost town.
Penns Creek Wild Area	Bald Eagle	Mifflin, Union	6,200 acres (2,509 ha)	2016	
Quebec Run Wild Area	Forbes	Fayette	7,441 acres (3,011 ha)	2004	
Quehanna Wild Area	Elk and Moshannon	Cameron, Clearfield, Elk	50,000 acres (20,234 ha)	1966	Largest Wild Area in Pennsylvania.
Russell P. Letterman Wild Area	Sproul	Clinton	4,715 acres (1,908 ha)		Traversed by the Chuck Keiper Trail.
Square Timber Wild Area	Elk	Cameron	8,461 acres (3,424 ha)		
Stairway Wild Area	Delaware	Pike	2,882 acres (1,166 ha)		
Thickhead Mountain Wild Area	Rothrock	Centre, Huntingdon	4,886 acres (1,977 ha)		
Trough Creek Wild Area	Rothrock	Huntingdon	1,703 acres (689 ha)		
Wolf Run Wild Area	Tiadaghton	Lycoming	6,900 acres (2,792 ha)		Traversed by the Golden Eagle Trail.

== See also ==
- List of Pennsylvania state forests
- List of Pennsylvania state forest natural areas
