= Clear Creek State Forest =

State forest in Pennsylvania, United States

- IUCN category VI (protected area with sustainable use of natural resources)
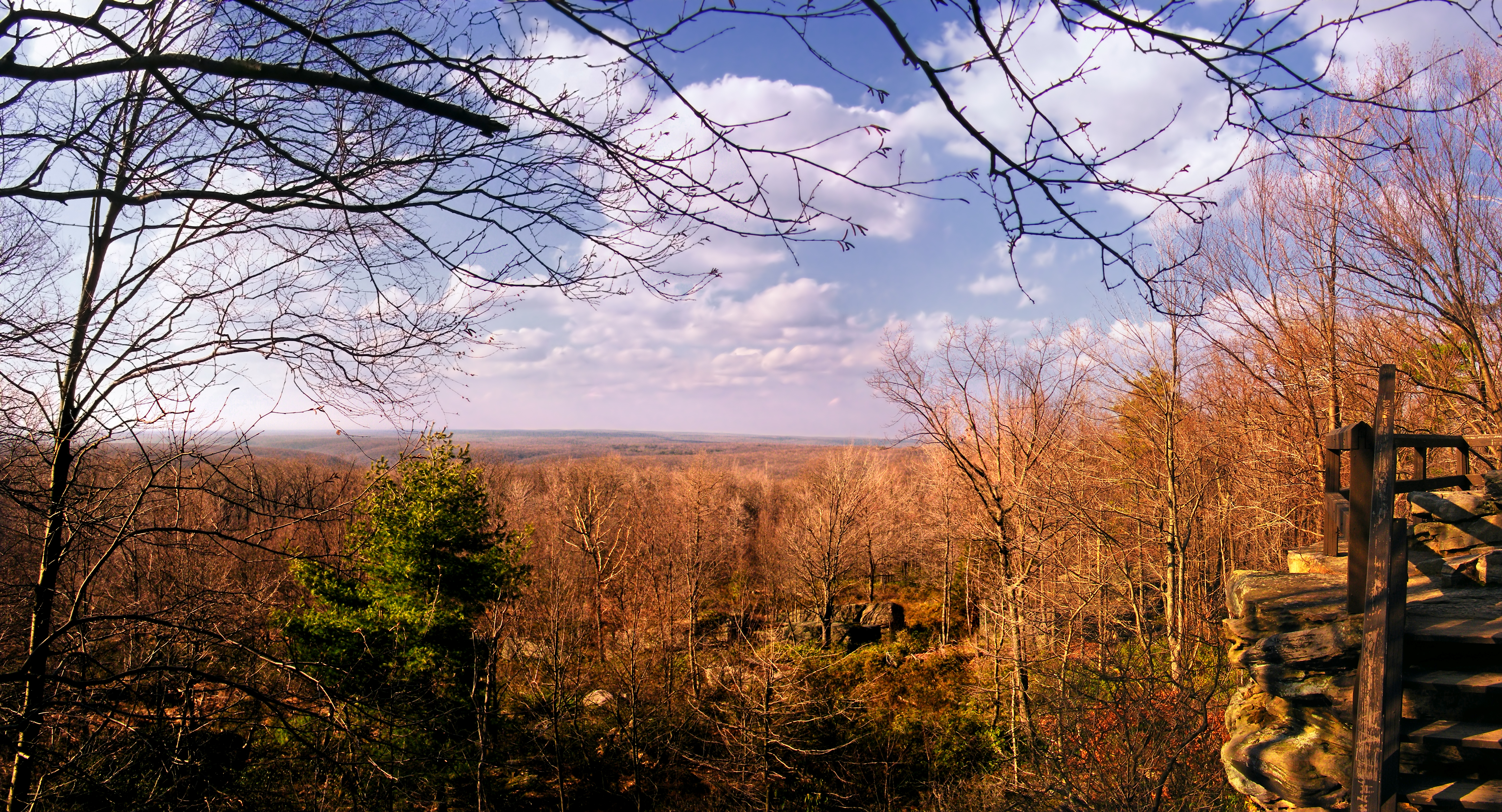

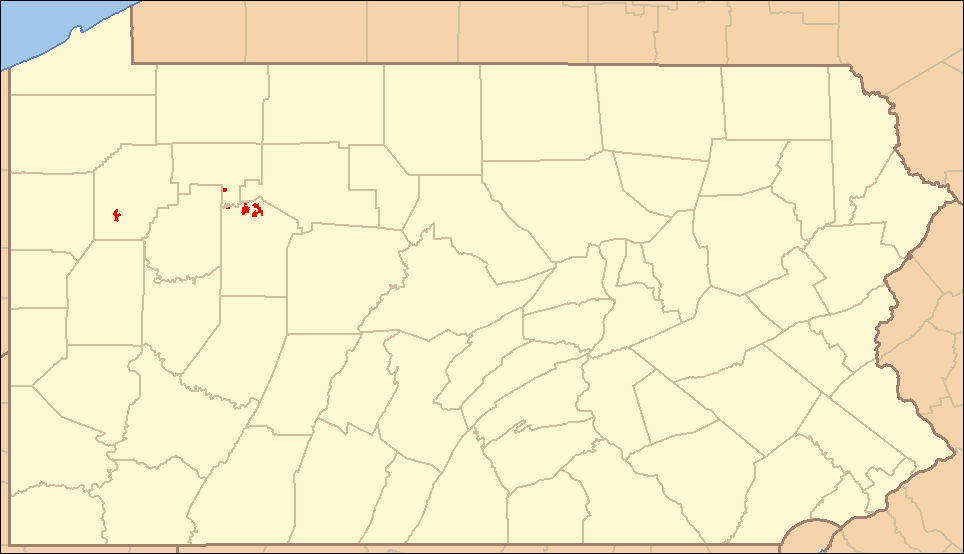
- Location of Clear Creek State Forest in Pennsylvania
- Location: Pennsylvania, United States
- Coordinates: 41°19′14″N 79°03′22″W
- Area: 16,716 acres (67.65 km^{2})
- Elevation: 1,808 ft (551 m)
- Established: 1919
- Named for: Clear Creek
- Governing body: Pennsylvania Department of Conservation and Natural Resources
- Website: Clear Creek State Forest

Clear Creek State Forest (formerly Kittanning State Forest) is a Pennsylvania State Forest in Pennsylvania Bureau of Forestry District #8. The main offices are located in Clarion in Clarion County, Pennsylvania in the United States. Until August 2007, it was named Kittanning State Forest.

The forest is located on a total of 16,716 acres (6,765 ha) across three separate tracts in Jefferson County, Venango County, Forest County, Mercer County, and Clarion County.

Clear Creek State Forest is managed under the "Multiple Use Management" system. The Pennsylvania Department of Conservation of Natural Resources considers many different uses for the forest land and places top priority on the most important use for any given area. Clear Creek State Forest is currently open for recreational purposes such as hunting, fishing, hiking and mountain biking. Several timber, oil and gas companies use the natural resources of the forest. The Pennsylvania Game Commission is responsible for wildlife management in Clear Creek State Forest.

== History ==
Clear Creek State Forest was formed as a direct result of the depletion of the forests of Pennsylvania that took place during the mid-to-late 19th century. Conservationists like Dr. Joseph Rothrock became concerned that the forests would not regrow if they were not managed properly. Lumber and Iron companies had harvested the old-growth forests for various reasons. They clear cut the forests and left behind nothing but dried tree tops and rotting stumps. The sparks of passing steam locomotives ignited wildfires that prevented the formation of second growth forests.

Conservationists feared that the forest would never regrow if there was not a change in the philosophy of forest management. They called for the state to purchase land from the lumber and iron companies and the lumber and iron companies were more than willing to sell their land since that had depleted the natural resources of the forests. The changes began to take place in 1895 when Dr. Rothrock was appointed the first commissioner of the Pennsylvania Department of Forests and Waters, the forerunner of today's Pennsylvania Department of Conservation and Natural Resources. The Pennsylvania General Assembly passed a piece of legislation in 1897 that authorized the purchase of "unseated lands for forest reservations". This was the beginning of the State Forest system.

The first parcel of land that was to become Clear Creek State Forest was purchased by the Commonwealth of Pennsylvania for $6,880. The original purchase of 3,200 acres (1,300 ha) was purchased in 1919 at the end of the lumber era that swept throughout the mountains of Pennsylvania. The state continued to purchase land throughout the 20th century with the last acquisition taking place in 1980. Most of the land was acquired from large scale lumbering corporations. These lumber businesses stripped the old growth forest that once spread over most of Pennsylvania. They began lumbering on a large scale in 1883 when the first sawmills were constructed in the area along the many creeks that drained the Allegheny Plateau. The lumbermen harvested the hemlock and white pine trees on an almost exclusive basis. The logs of hemlock and pine were lashed together in rafts and floated down the Clarion River and into the Allegheny River to Pittsburgh. The lumber companies also built three logging railroads in the area to get the lumber out of the mountains and on to the cities of Western Pennsylvania.

The lumbering operations left behind what has been described as a "barren wasteland" of stumps and dried treetops. The sparks cast off by passing steam trains set off massive forest fires. These fires slowed the development of the second growth forest that now covers Clear Creek State Forest. The forests have largely regrown with the hemlock and white pine trees being replaced with thriving populations of various hardwood trees.

== Neighboring state forest districts ==
The U.S. state of Ohio is to the west

- Cornplanter State Forest (north)
- Elk State Forest (northeast)
- Moshannon State Forest (east)
- Gallitzin State Forest (southeast)
- Forbes State Forest (south)

== Nearby state parks ==
- Clear Creek State Park
- Cook Forest State Park
