= Pinchot Trail System =

Hiking trail in Pennsylvania

Coordinates: 41.2466°N 75.6224°W

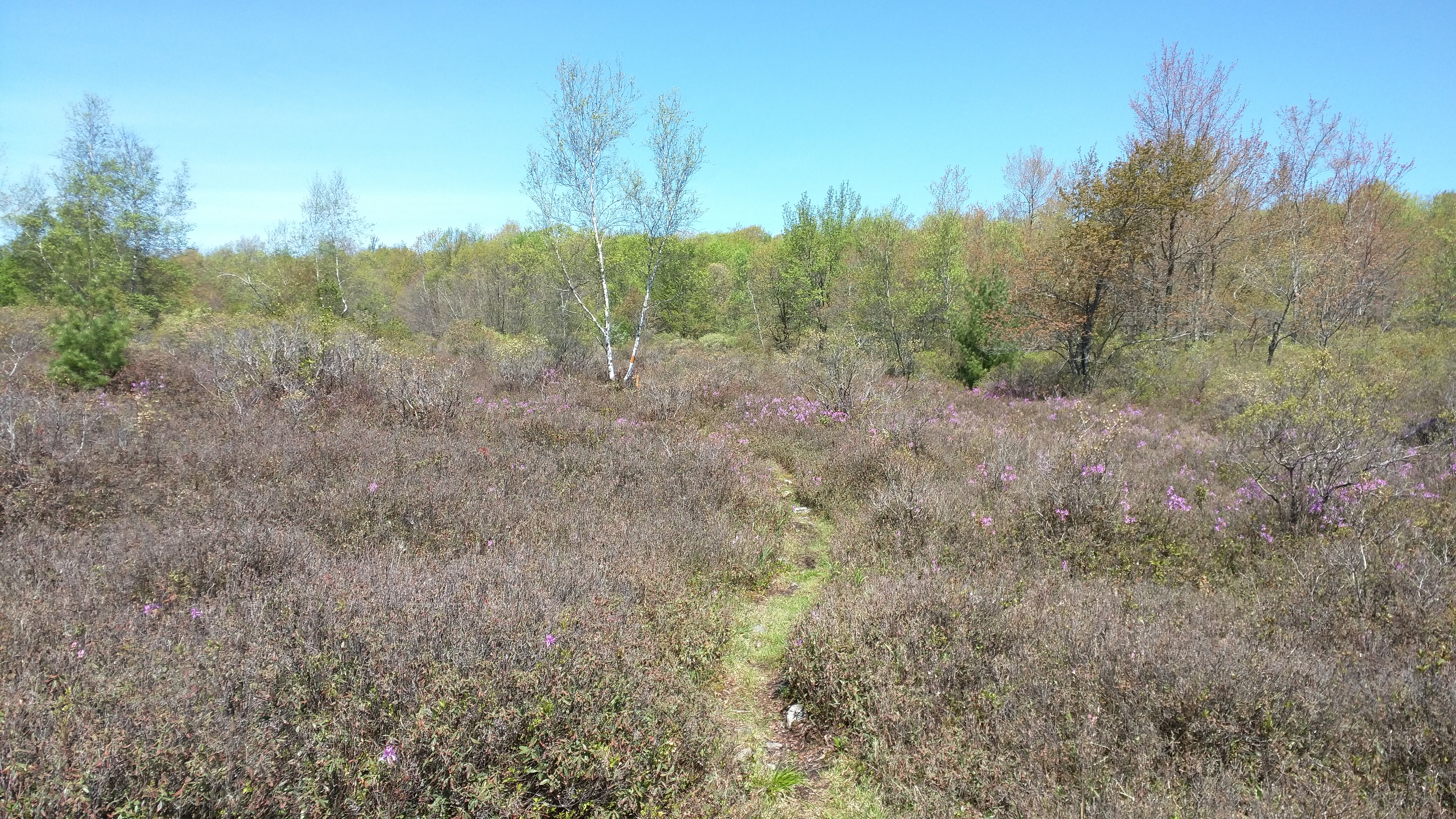
- A meadow traversed by the south section of the Pinchot Trail System.
- Length: 22.2 mi (35.7 km)
- Location: Lackawanna County, Pennsylvania, US
- Trailheads: Bear Lake Road, southern Lackawanna County
- Use: Hiking
- Elevation change: Low
- Difficulty: Moderate
- Season: Year-round
- Hazards: Uneven and wet terrain, rattlesnakes, mosquitoes, ticks, black bears

The Pinchot Trail System is a 22.2-mile (35.7 km) hiking trail in Pinchot State Forest in the Pocono Mountains region of northeastern Pennsylvania. The trail is marked with orange blazes as a designated Pennsylvania State Forest hiking trail. While it is a single loop trail, the word "System" is in its name because it was formed from several previously existing trails with distinct names, and many of those old names are still visible on trail signs for their historical interest.

== History and route ==
The trail was named after Gifford Pinchot, a native of northeastern Pennsylvania who served as Governor of Pennsylvania and was the first director of the United States Forest Service. The system was constructed in the 1970s by tying together various short trails, in what was then the southern section of the former Lackawanna State Forest, with some newly constructed segments to form a long loop. The project was spearheaded by a local volunteer named Frank Gantz.

The Pinchot Trail System includes few significant climbs, while the footway is unusually rock-free for the Poconos region though it is often wet and muddy. It is known for opportunities to view birds and wildflowers. From the main trailhead on Bear Lake Road, the hiker could complete a continuous loop of 22.2 miles. The trail crosses Bear Lake Road twice, with the crossings just 0.4 mile apart. This creates an option to break the main loop into the two shorter loops. Including walks on the road, this enables a loop hike on the south section of 13.3 miles and a loop hike on the north section of 9.8 miles.

=== South section ===
Heading south from the trailhead parking lot at the corner of Bear Lake Road and Tannery Road, the trail passes through a system of meadows, and at 1.8 miles reaches the remains of a stone tower that was built in 1890 as a tribute to a local man who had died in a boating accident. Shortly thereafter, the trail skirts the northern and eastern edges of Spruce Swamp Natural Area. The trail crosses the unpaved Tannery Road at 3.3 miles and continues parallel to Sand Spring Creek. At 5.1 miles, the trail turns sharply off of its old route and onto a new segment that was built in 2018 to reach the popular Choke Creek Falls. The trail reaches that waterfall at 6.0 miles, then turns to the west and follows Choke Creek upstream until the 8.8 mile point.

The trail then turns north and climbs moderately away from the Choke Creek watershed. At 10.7 miles it turns west onto another new segment that was built in 2018 to eliminate a long walk on Tannery Road. The trail eventually turns back to the north and follows the boundary between Pinchot State Forest and State Game Lands #91. At 12.9 miles the trail reaches the paved Bear Lake Road again. Here the hiker can continue onto the north section (see below), or if hiking only the south section, walk east along the road for 0.4 mile to return to the trailhead parking lot.

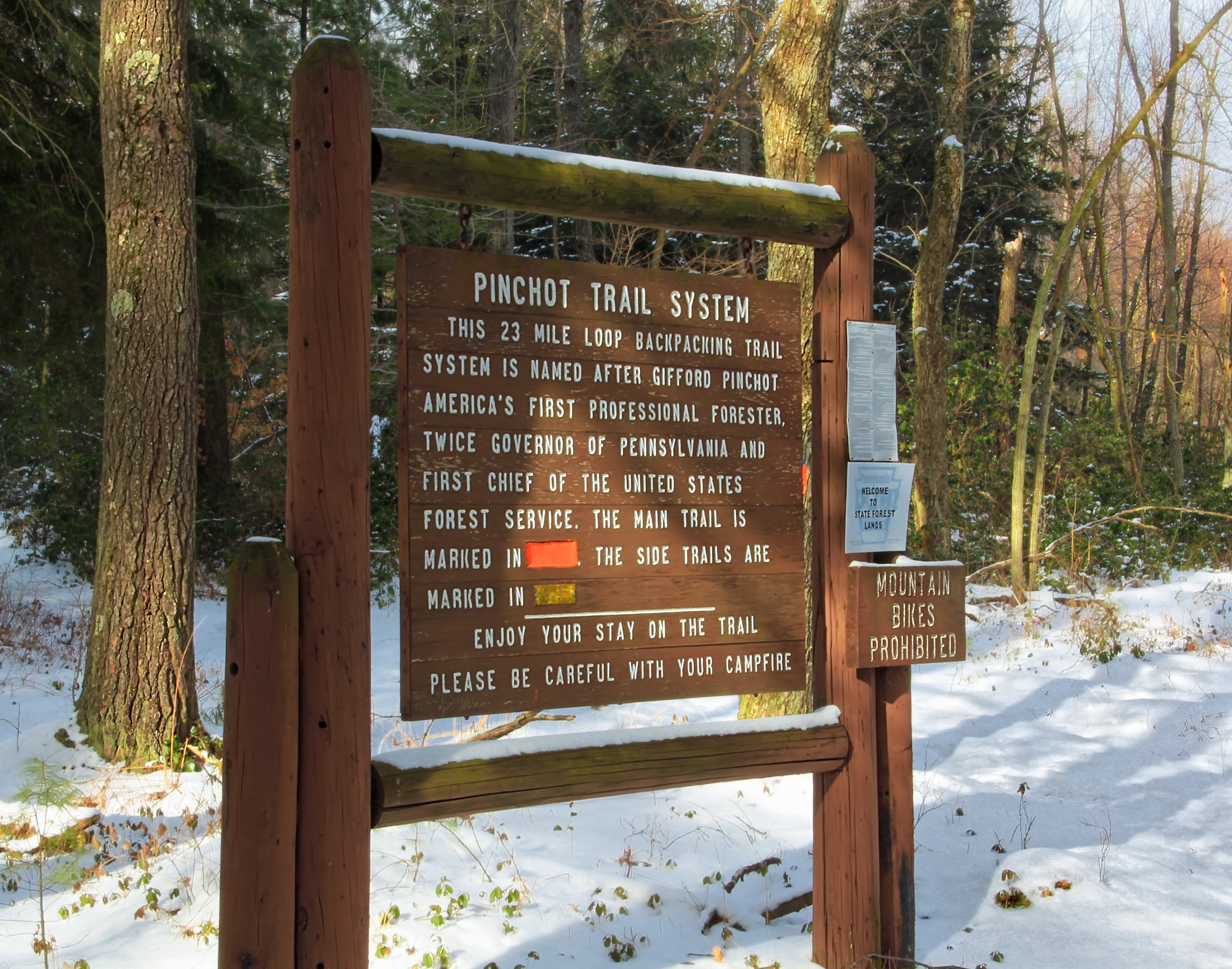
An informational sign at the trailhead on Bear Lake Road.

=== North section ===
A hiker wishing to complete only the north section could start at the main trailhead and walk west on Bear Lake Road for 0.4 mile to the Pinchot Trail System's other crossing of the road at its 12.9 mile point. The trail continues to the north, following the boundary of Pinchot State Forest and a private land tract. At 14.5 miles the trail turns east on an old grassy lane, then turns north again. The trail crosses Painter Creek at 16.4 miles and trends to the east. At 17.0 miles it turns south at a junction with a side trail and continues through a high plateau area until crossing Sassafras Hill Road at 19.2 miles.

At 19.9 miles the trail turns to the west and traverses a more varied landscape. It briefly walks along the unpaved Pittston Road at 20.5 miles and continues to the west. At 21.6 miles the trail crosses a large parking lot and secondary trailhead, then turns west on the paved Bear Lake Road, following it for 0.6 mile. The hiker then reaches the main trailhead parking area at 22.2 miles, ending the loop.
