= Marion Brooks Natural Area =

Natural area in Pennsylvania

- IUCN category V (protected landscape/seascape)
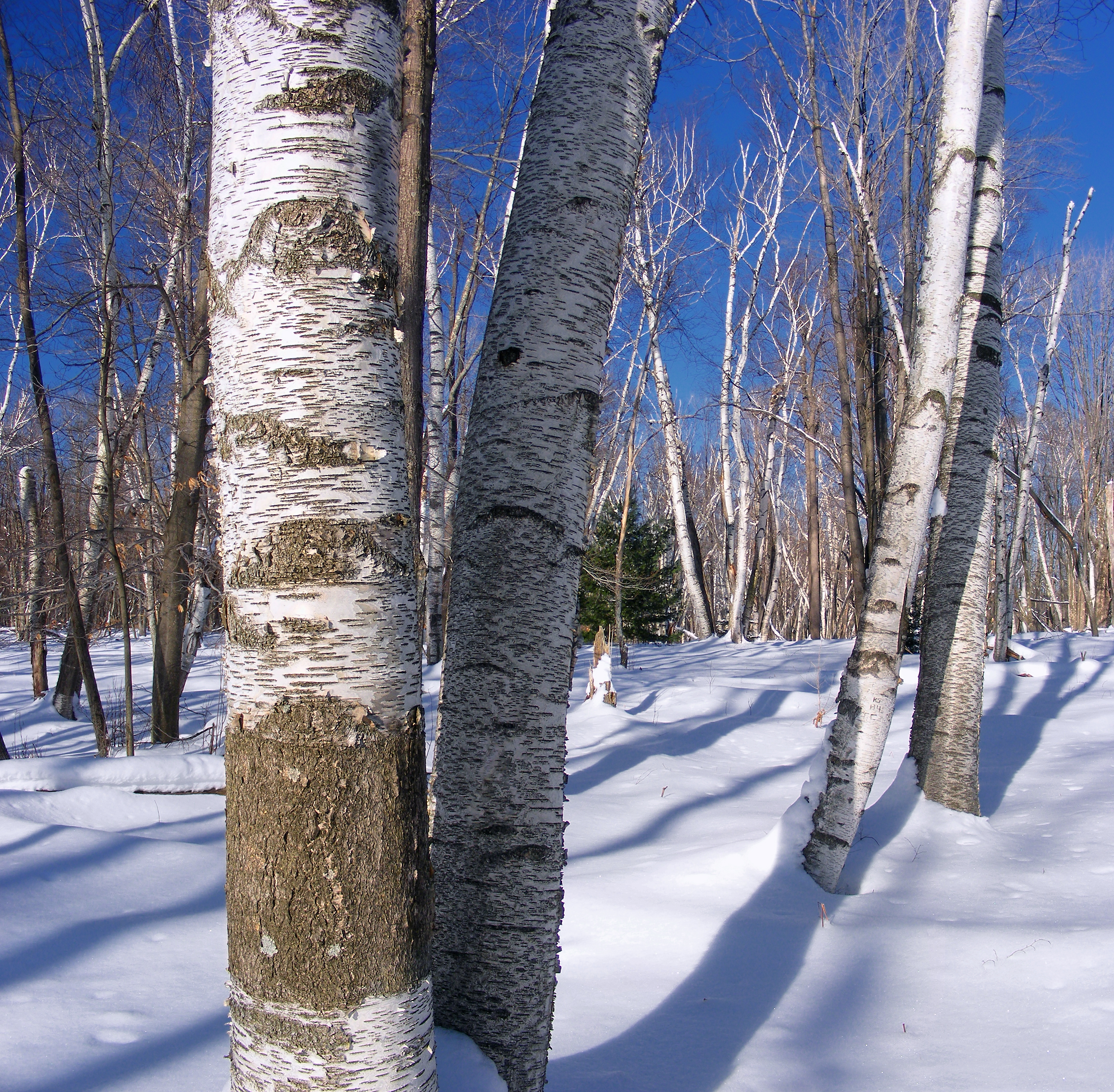
- White birch trees in Marion Brooks Natural Area

- Location within Pennsylvania
- Location: Elk County, Pennsylvania
- Nearest city: Benezette
- Coordinates: 41°16′35″N 78°17′16″W
- Area: 917 acres (371 ha)

Marion Brooks Natural Area is a state forest natural area in Moshannon State Forest in Benezette Township, Elk County in the U.S. state of Pennsylvania. The 917-acre (371 ha) natural area is located on the northwest edge of Quehanna Wild Area. It was originally known as Paige Run Natural Area but was later renamed in 1975, after Marion E. Brooks, a local environmentalist. The area was set aside for protection of one of the largest known stands of white birch trees in the eastern United States. In this region, the trees are fairly close to the southern limit of their native range.
