= Bear Run Natural Area =

Natural area in Pennsylvania

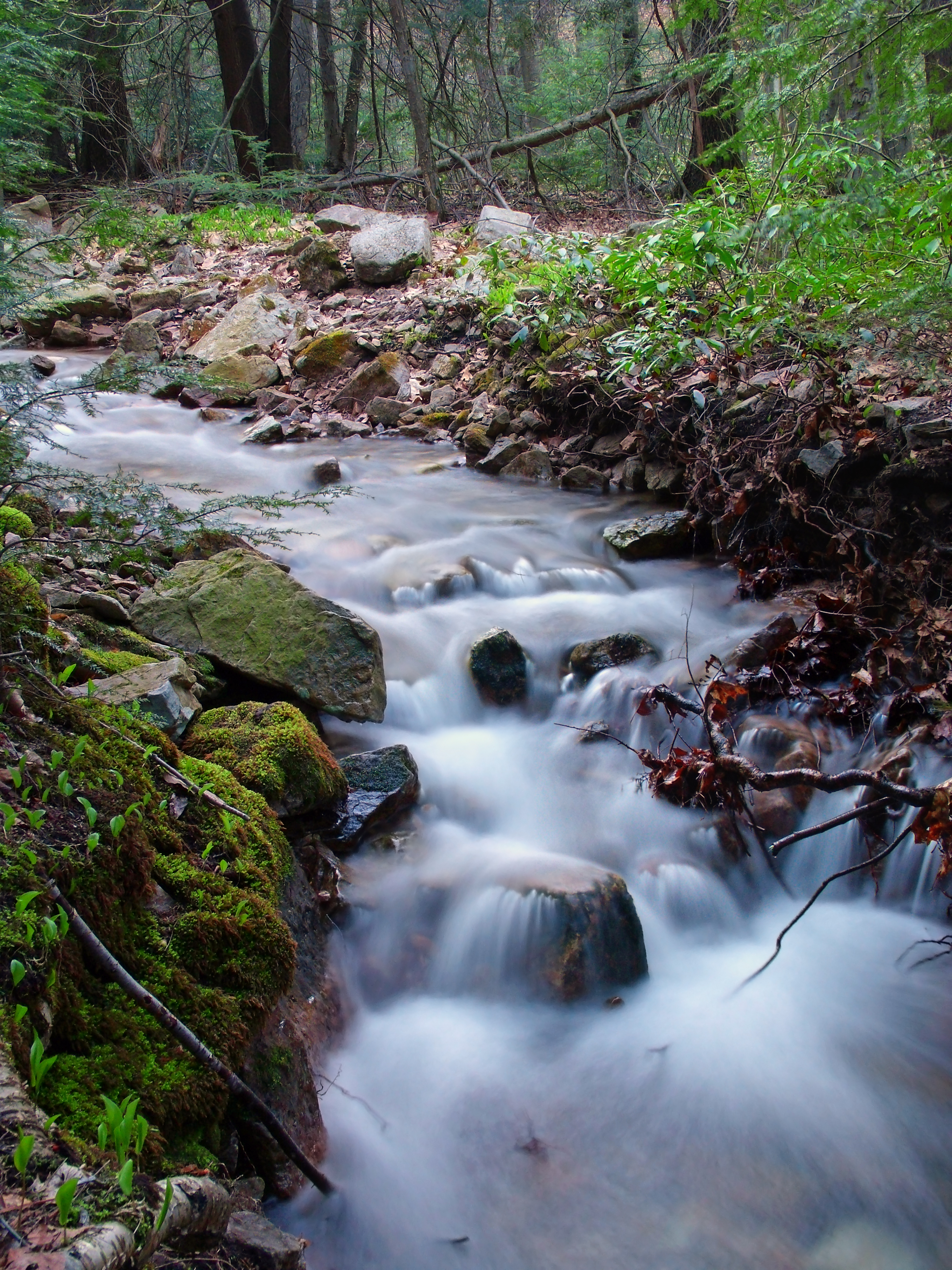
- Bear Run in the natural area of the same name

- Location within Pennsylvania
- Location: Centre County, Pennsylvania
- Nearest town: Woodward
- Coordinates: 40°53′10″N 77°19′25″W
- Area: 32 acres (13 ha)

Bear Run Natural Area is a 32-acre (13 ha) protected area in Centre County, Pennsylvania, United States. It is part of Bald Eagle State Forest. The area protects a small stand of old-growth hemlock and tulip trees. These trees may have survived the Pennsylvania logging era of the late 1800s, because loggers may have chosen to preserve the stand as a shady rest area for themselves and their draft animals.
