= Pine Ridge Natural Area =

Natural area in Pennsylvania

- Location within Pennsylvania
- Location: Bedford County, Pennsylvania
- Nearest town: Chaneysville
- Coordinates: 39°47′21″N 78°28′34″W
- Area: 568 acres (230 ha)
- Established: 1970

Pine Ridge Natural Area is a 568-acre (230 ha) protected area in Bedford County, Pennsylvania, United States. It is part of Buchanan State Forest.

== Description ==
The natural area highlights former resettlement lands that housed struggling farms that were bought out by the American government as part of a New Deal program during the Great Depression, with the residents resettled elsewhere. The former farm fields have since reverted to forest, largely due to the natural propagation of Virginia pine trees. The forest features many decayed building foundations, apple tree orchards, and cemeteries.
