= Moshannon State Forest =

State forest in Pennsylvania, United States

- IUCN category VI (protected area with sustainable use of natural resources)
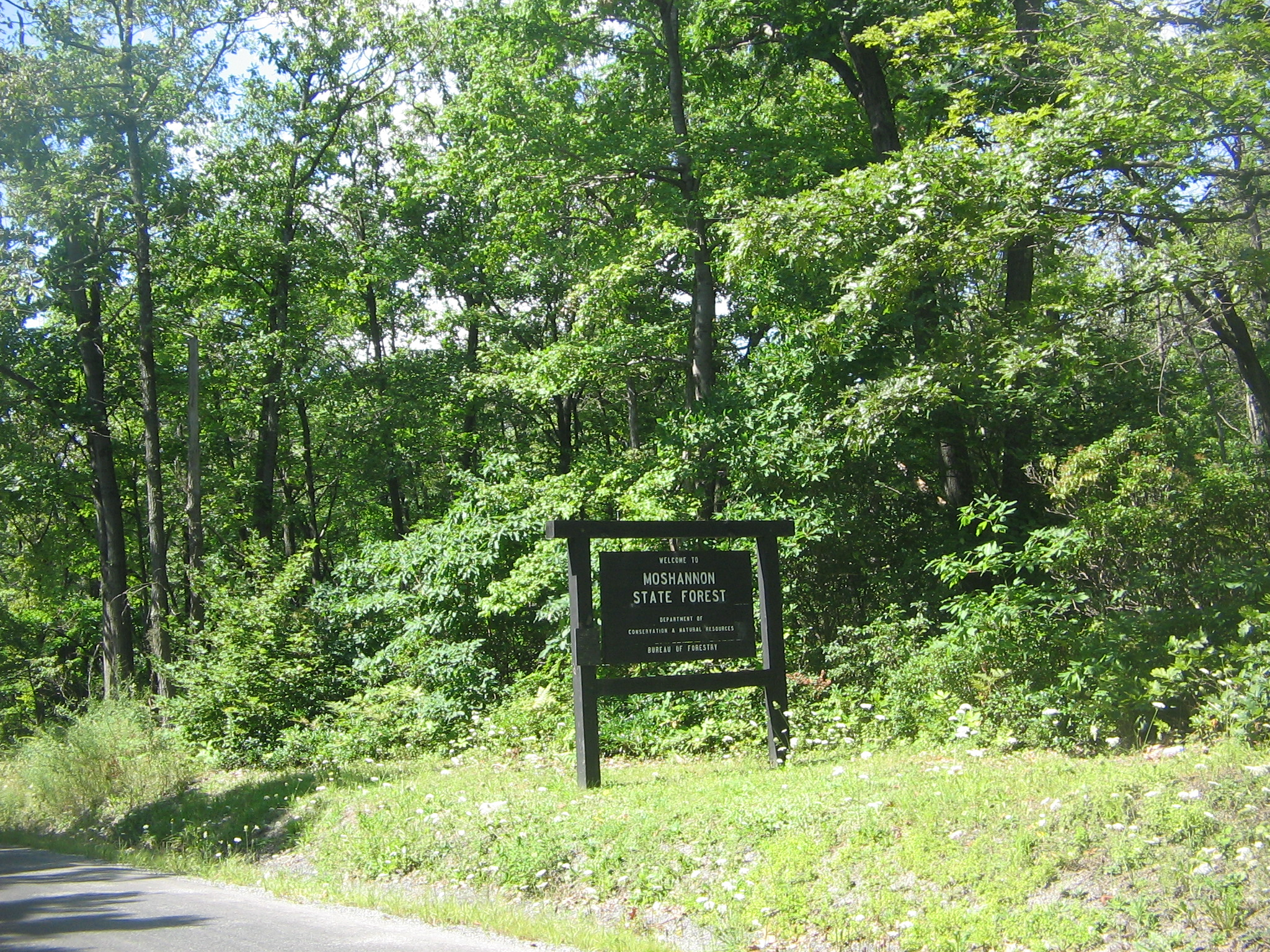
- Sign for the Moshannon State Forest on Pennsylvania Route 504 in Centre County

- Location within Pennsylvania
- Location: Pennsylvania, United States
- Coordinates: 41°12′30″N 78°34′32″W
- Governing body: Pennsylvania Department of Conservation and Natural Resources
- Website: Moshannon State Forest

Moshannon State Forest is a Pennsylvania State Forest in Pennsylvania Bureau of Forestry District #9. The main offices are located in the unincorporated village of Penfield in Huston Township, Clearfield County, Pennsylvania in the United States.

The forest is located chiefly in Centre, Clearfield, and Elk Counties, with small parts of the forest also in Cameron and Clinton Counties.

== History ==
Moshannon State Forest was formed as a direct result of the depletion of the forests of Pennsylvania that took place during the mid-to-late 19th century. Conservationists like Dr. Joseph Rothrock became concerned that the forests would not regrow if they were not managed properly. Lumber and iron companies had harvested the old-growth forests for various reasons. They clear cut the forests, and left behind nothing but dried tree tops and rotting stumps. The sparks of passing steam locomotives ignited wildfires that prevented the formation of second growth forests. The conservationists feared that the forest would never regrow if there was not a change in the philosophy of forest management. They called for the state to purchase land from the lumber and iron companies and the lumber and iron companies were more than willing to sell their land since they had already depleted the natural resources of the forests. The changes began to take place in 1895 when Dr. Rothrock was appointed the first commissioner of the Pennsylvania Department of Forests and Waters, the forerunner of today's Pennsylvania Department of Conservation and Natural Resources. The Pennsylvania General Assembly passed a piece of legislation in 1897 that authorized the purchase of "unseated lands for forest reservations". This was the beginning of the State Forest system.

The Commonwealth of Pennsylvania began purchasing tracts of land for what is now Moshannon State Forest on September 28, 1898. The first purchase was 352 acres (142 ha) on the banks of Montgomery Run to the north of Clearfield. It was purchased for just $65.45 to settle a delinquent tax payment. According to the Pennsylvania Department of Conservation and Natural Resources' web page, the state is still acquiring land that meets the "current guidelines" to become state forest land.

Much of the land that is now Moshannon State Forest has been purchased from lumber and land holding companies. At the time of purchase the land was largely devoid of trees. It was mostly dried brush and burnt scrub. This was a direct result of the clearcutting of the vast stands of old growth forest during the mid-to-late 19th century and very early 20th century. The lumber companies chopped down the hemlock and white pine forests that once covered much of Pennsylvania. According to Conrad Weiser, who wrote in 1737,

The wood is so thick, that for a mile at a time we could not find a place the size of a hand, where the sunshine would penetrate, even on the clearest day.

All of the virgin forest was gone by 1921. It has since been replaced by a thriving second growth forest of beech, yellow poplar, a variety of birch, oak, hickory, cherry, chestnut and maples. On May 31, 1985, a 2.2-mile-wide F4 tornado tore through part of the forest, destroying an estimated 88,000 trees.

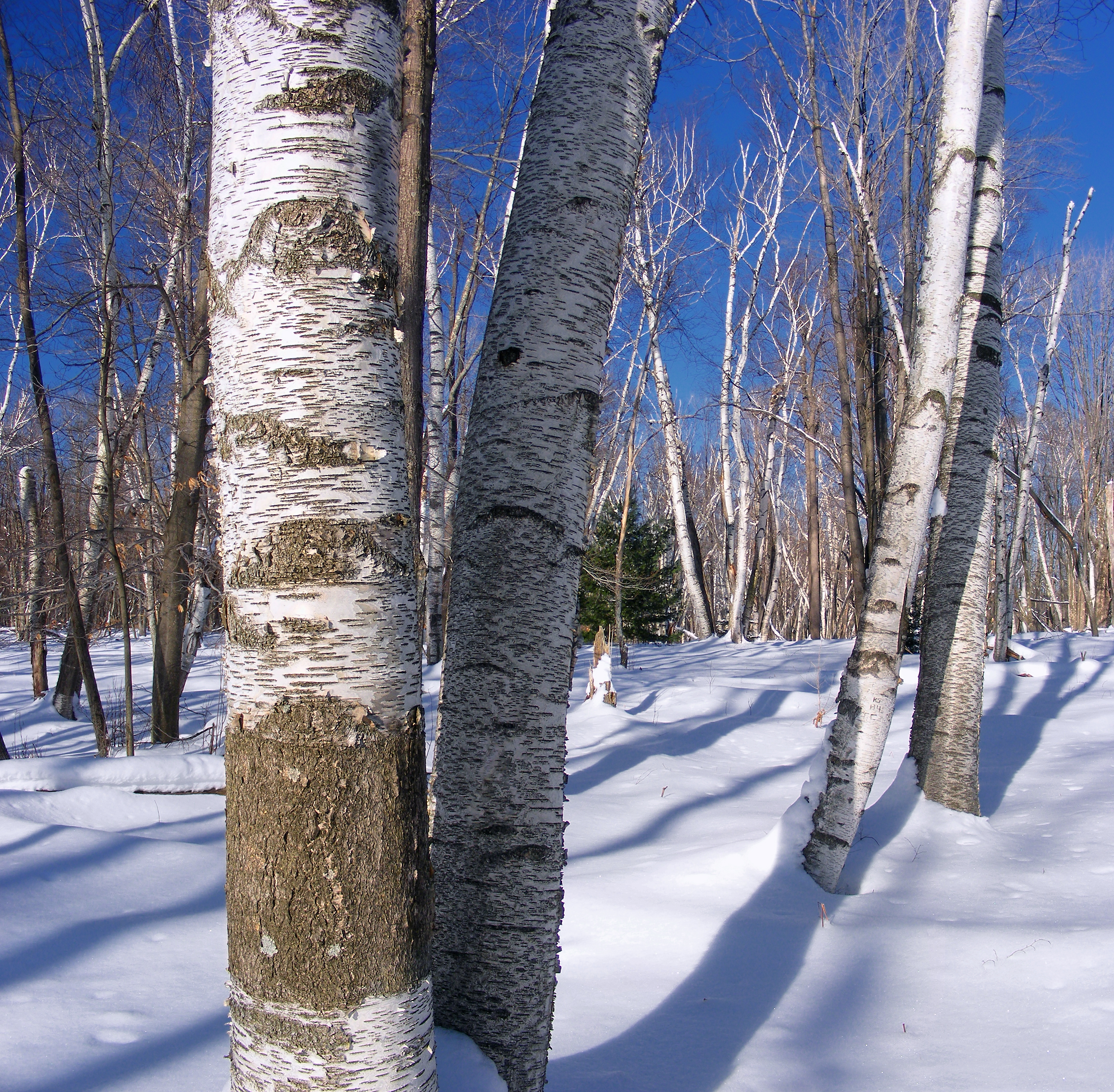
A winter scene in Marion Brooks Natural Area

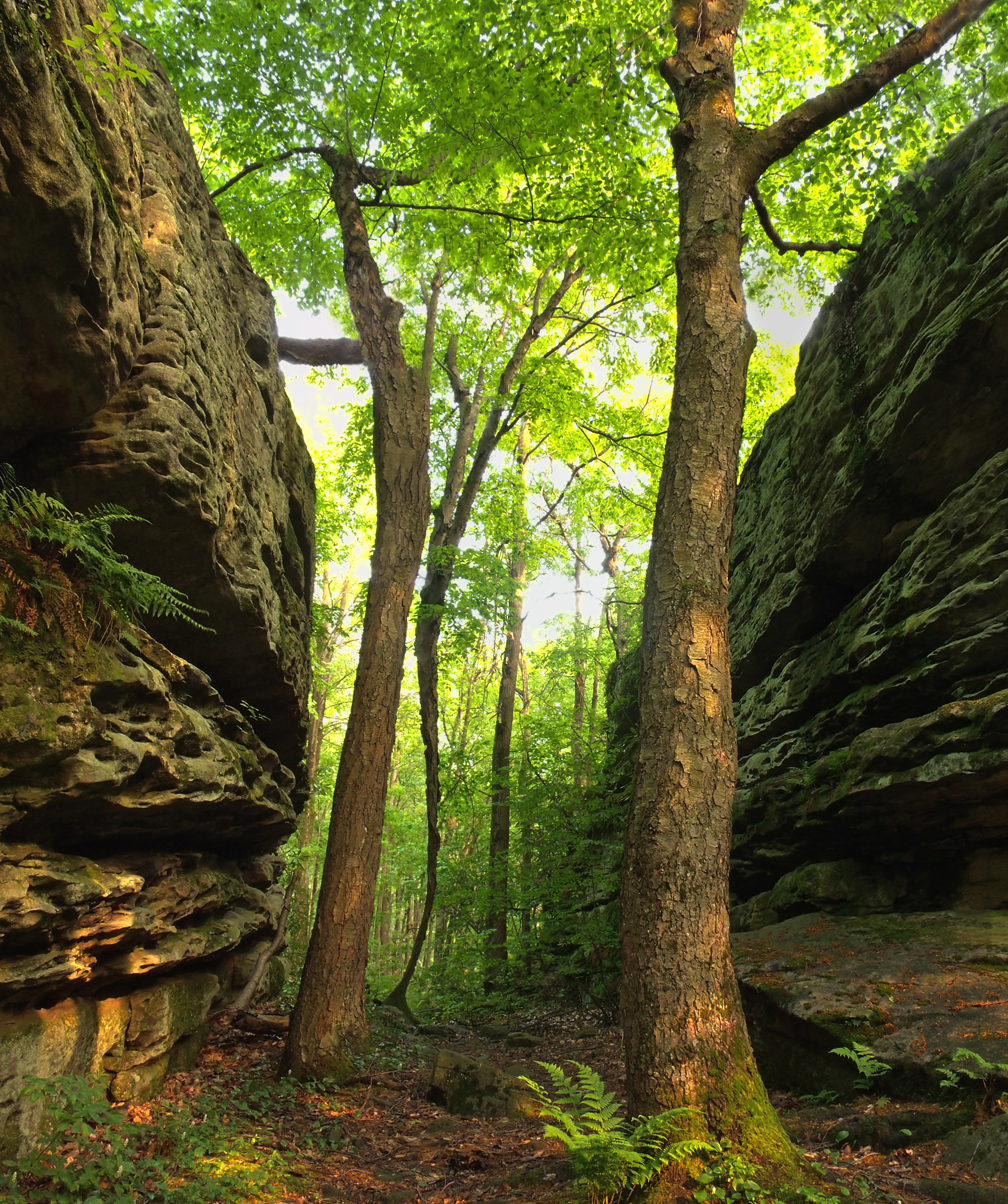
The Panther Rocks formation in Moshannon State Forest

== Neighboring state forest districts ==
- Elk State Forest (north)
- Sproul State Forest (east)
- Rothrock State Forest (southeast)
- Gallitzin State Forest (south)
- Clear Creek State Forest (west)

== Nearby state parks ==
Three Pennsylvania State Parks are located within Moshannon State Forest:

- Black Moshannon State Park (Centre County)
- Parker Dam State Park (Clearfield County)
- S. B. Elliott State Park (Clearfield County)

== Natural and wild areas ==
- Marion Brooks Natural Area
- Quehanna Wild Area
