= Mount Logan Natural Area =

Natural area in Pennsylvania

- Location within Pennsylvania
- Location: Clinton County, Pennsylvania
- Nearest town: Castanea
- Coordinates: 41°06′49″N 77°22′49″W
- Area: 512 acres (207 ha)

Mount Logan Natural Area is a 512-acre (207 ha) protected area in Clinton County, Pennsylvania, United States. It is part of Bald Eagle State Forest.

== Description ==
The Natural Area was established to protect a parcel of old-growth hemlock trees and to highlight a unique outcropping of Tuscarora sandstone. The area has also been named by Pennsylvania as a special protection zone for reptiles and amphibians. The Natural Area cannot be reached by road and requires a lengthy hike from nearby gravel roads that are themselves dilapidated.
