= Reynolds Spring Natural Area =

Natural area in Pennsylvania

- Location within Pennsylvania
- Location: Tioga County, Pennsylvania
- Nearest town: Cedar Run
- Coordinates: 41°33′44″N 77°31′51″W
- Area: 1,302 acres (527 ha)

Reynolds Spring Natural Area is a 1,302-acre (527 ha) protected area in Tioga County, Pennsylvania, United States. It is part of Tioga State Forest. The area has been designated as a National Natural Landmark.

== Description ==
The Natural Area was established to protect an uncommon pine swamp and stands of several different tree species including oak and aspen. The area also protect many plant species that are not commonly found in Pennsylvania, including pitcher plants, sedges, and sphagnum moss.
