= Spruce Swamp Natural Area =

Natural area in Pennsylvania

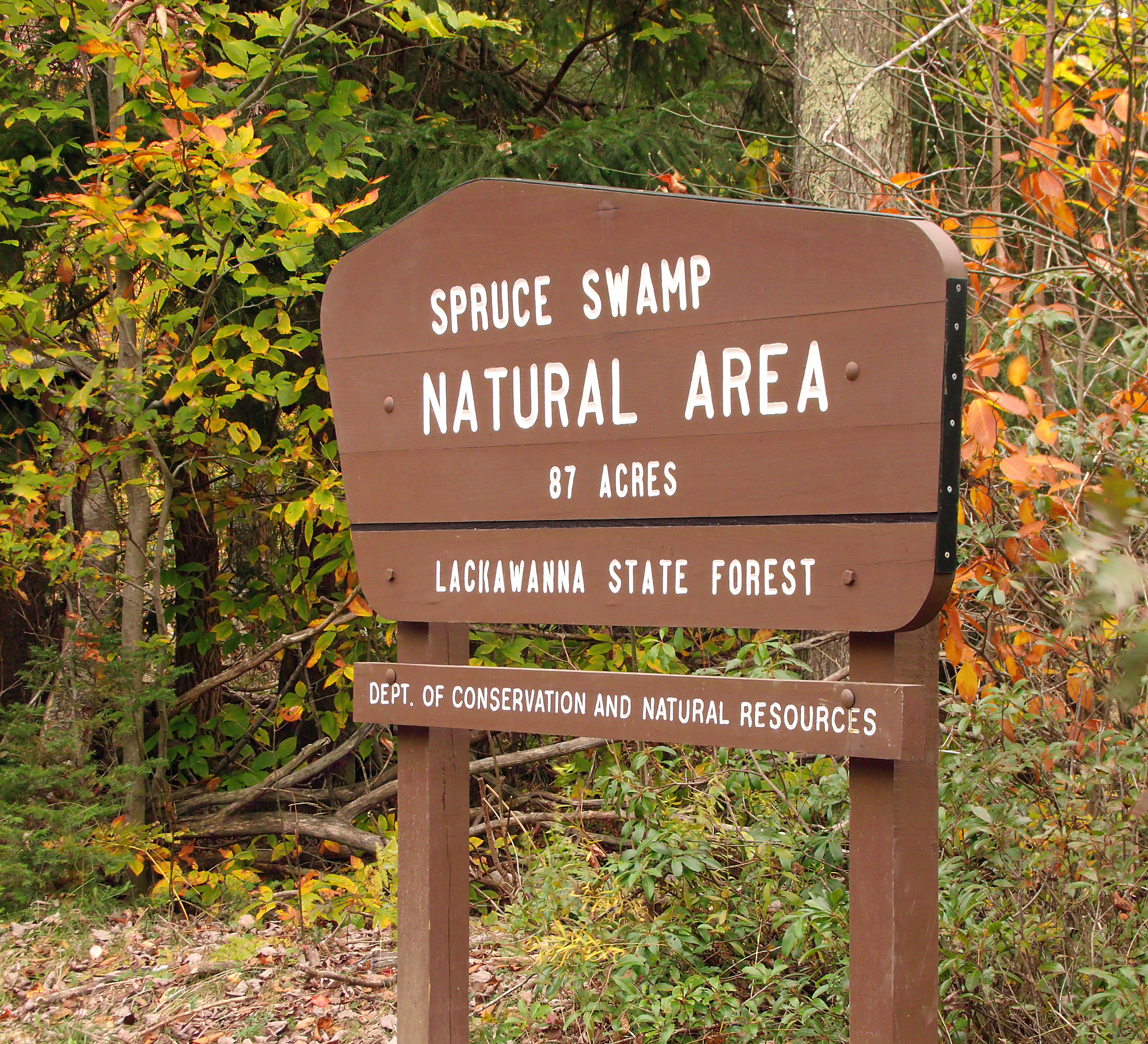

- Location within Pennsylvania
- Location: Lackawanna County, Pennsylvania
- Nearest town: Thornhurst
- Coordinates: 41°12′02″N 75°37′09″W
- Area: 87 acres (35 ha)

Spruce Swamp Natural Area is a 87-acre (35 ha) protected area in Lackawanna County, Pennsylvania, United States. It is part of Pinchot State Forest.

== Description ==
The Natural Area was established to protect a glacial bog of a type that is uncommon in Pennsylvania, protecting the habitats of several plant species that have been classified as threatened in Pennsylvania. It is named specifically for the black spruce which is relatively rare in Pennsylvania. A grove of tamarack trees have also been noted for their colorful fall foliage. The area is also known for hosting a wide variety of songbirds. The north and east edges of the area are traversed by the Pinchot Trail System.
