= Anders Run Natural Area =

Natural area in Pennsylvania

- Location within Pennsylvania
- Location: Warren County, Pennsylvania
- Nearest town: Youngsville
- Coordinates: 41°49′29″N 79°16′31″W
- Area: 96 acres (39 ha)
- Established: 1987

Anders Run Natural Area is a 96-acre (39 ha) protected area in Warren County, Pennsylvania, United States. It is part of Cornplanter State Forest.

The Natural Area contains about 50 acres (20 ha) of old-growth forest. Although parts of the area were logged during the first two decades of the 19th century, tree rings of fallen trees have revealed 200-year-old white pines and 400-year-old hemlocks. These trees are also known for their impressive size.

In addition to its forests, the Natural Area also has a stream with native trout and fine stands of wildflowers. There is a historic residence on the property built in 1841 called the "Little Stone House", though in recent years the structure has fallen into a severe state of disrepair. The Natural Area has about 2 miles (3.2 km) of hiking trails.

== See also ==
- List of old growth forests
