= List of Pennsylvania state forests =

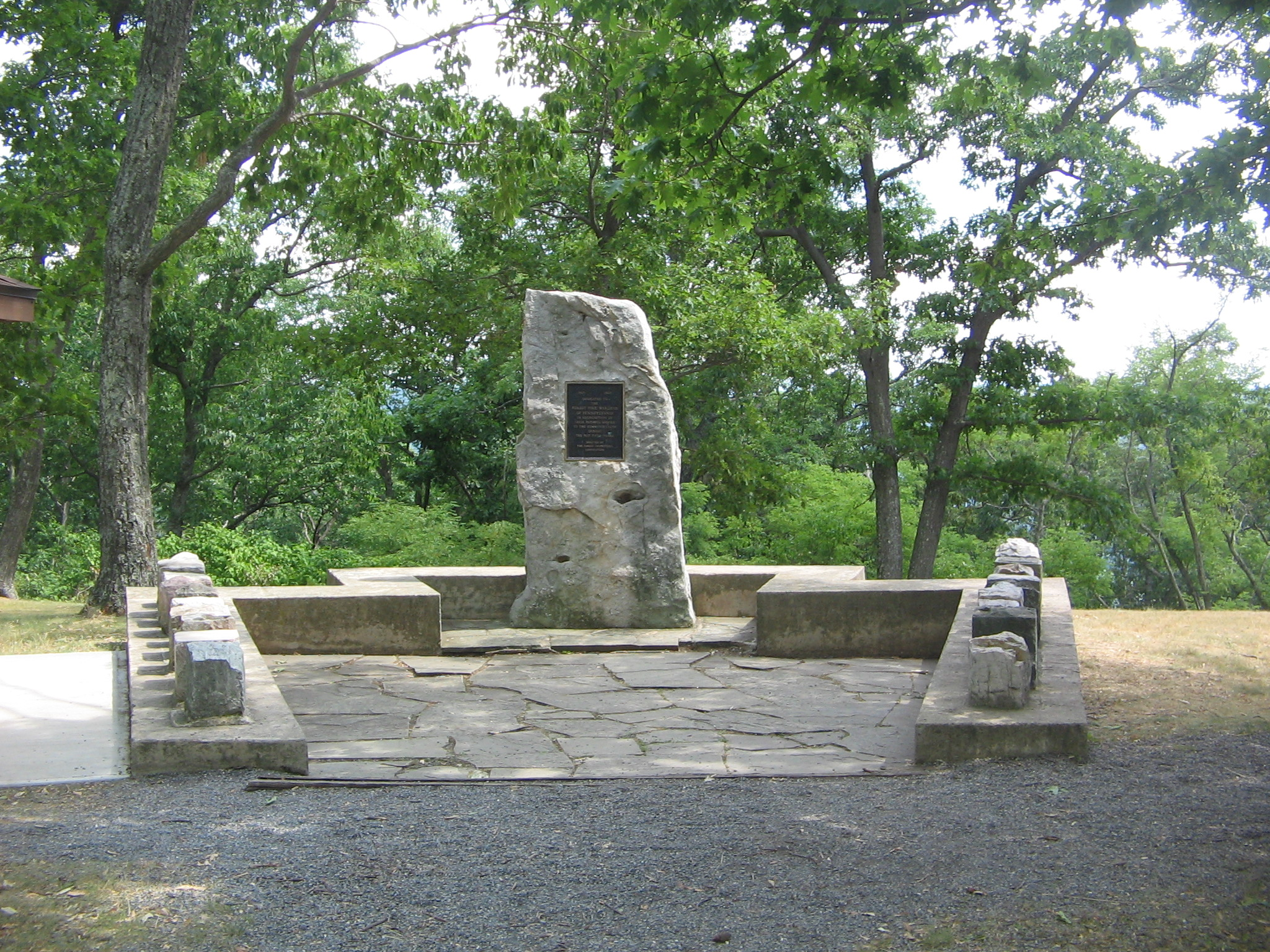
Forest Fire Wardens Monument with small stones for each of the 20 state forests at Hyner View State Park

There are 20 state forests in the Commonwealth of Pennsylvania in the United States. They are managed by the Pennsylvania Bureau of Forestry, a division of the Pennsylvania Department of Conservation and Natural Resources.

== List of Pennsylvania state forests ==
| State forest name | County | Area acres (ha) | Founded |
|---|---|---|---|
| Bald Eagle | Centre, Clinton, Mifflin, Union,Snyder | 194,602 acres (78,750 ha) | 1898 |
| Buchanan | Bedford, Franklin, Fulton | 71,683 acres (29,010 ha) | 1904 |
| Clear Creek | Clarion, Forest, Jefferson, Mercer, Venango | 16,716 acres (6,765 ha) | 1919, as Kittanning State Forest; renamed 2007 |
| Cornplanter | Crawford, Forest, Warren | 1,585 acres (641 ha) | |
| Delaware | Pike, Monroe | 85,114 acres (34,444 ha) | |
| Elk | Cameron, Clinton, Elk, McKean, Potter | 217,000 acres (87,820 ha) | |
| Forbes | Fayette, Somerset, Westmoreland | 59,000 acres (23,880 ha) | 1909 |
| Gallitzin | Bedford, Cambria, Indiana, Somerset | 24,370 acres (9,862 ha) | 1916 |
| Loyalsock | Bradford, Lycoming, Sullivan | 114,552 acres (46,360 ha) | 2005 |
| Michaux | Adams, Cumberland, Franklin | 85,500 acres (34,600 ha) | |
| Moshannon | Cameron, Centre, Clearfield, Clinton, Elk | 190,031 acres (76,903 ha) | 1898 |
| Pinchot | Lackawanna, Luzerne, Wayne, Wyoming | 54,000 acres (21,853 ha) | 1902 as Lackawanna State Forest; renamed 2015 |
| Rothrock | Centre, Huntingdon, Mifflin | 96,975 acres (39,240 ha) | 1903 |
| Sproul | Cameron, Centre, Clinton, Lycoming, Potter | 305,450 acres (123,610 ha) | 1898 |
| Susquehannock | Clinton, McKean, Potter | 265,000 acres (107,242 ha) | 1901 |
| Tiadaghton | Clinton, Lycoming, Potter, Tioga, Union | 146,539 acres (59,300 ha) | 1900 |
| Tioga | Bradford, Lycoming, Tioga | 161,890 acres (65,510 ha) | 1900 |
| Tuscarora | Cumberland, Franklin, Huntingdon, Juniata, Mifflin, Perry | 96,025 acres (38,860 ha) | 1902 |
| Weiser | Carbon, Columbia, Dauphin, Northumberland, Schuylkill | 30,000 acres (12,141 ha) | |
| William Penn | Berks, Bucks, Chester, Delaware, Lancaster | 1,683 acres (681 ha) | 1935, as Valley Forge State Forest; renamed 2007 |

== Former state forests ==
| State forest name | County | Area acres (ha) | Founded | Remarks |
|---|---|---|---|---|
| Kittanning | Jefferson | 13,266 acres (5,369 ha) | 1919 | Renamed Clear Creek State Forest in 2007 |
| Lackawanna | Lackawanna | 44,743 acres (18,107 ha) | 1902 | Renamed Pinchot State Forest in 2015 |
| Valley Forge | Chester | 812 acres (329 ha) | 1935 | Renamed William Penn State Forest in 2007 |
| Wyoming | Sullivan | | | Subsumed into Loyalsock State Forest in 2005 |

Size and location of Pennsylvania's state forests

== See also ==
- List of Pennsylvania state forest wild areas
- List of Pennsylvania state forest natural areas
