= Lebo Red Pine Natural Area =

Natural area in Pennsylvania

- Location within Pennsylvania
- Location: Lycoming County, Pennsylvania
- Nearest town: Haneyville
- Coordinates: 41°23′10″N 77°30′02″W
- Area: 124 acres (50 ha)

Lebo Red Pine Natural Area is a 124-acre (50 ha) protected area in Lycoming County, Pennsylvania, United States. It is part of Tiadaghton State Forest.

The Natural Area protects a copse of naturally occurring and unplanted red pine trees, which is relatively uncommon in Pennsylvania. These trees may have survived the Pennsylvania logging era of the late 1800s. The area is only accessible via unmarked paths from a nearby gravel road.
