= Rosecrans Bog Natural Area =

Natural area in Pennsylvania

- Location within Pennsylvania
- Location: Clinton County, Pennsylvania
- Nearest town: Rosecrans
- Coordinates: 41°04′35″N 77°17′18″W
- Area: 152 acres (62 ha)

Rosecrans Bog Natural Area is a 152-acre (62 ha) protected area in Clinton County, Pennsylvania, United States. It is part of Bald Eagle State Forest.

== Description ==
The Natural Area was established to protect a high-elevation swamp of a type uncommon in Pennsylvania, containing cranberry, mountain holly, and high-bush blueberry. The area is a natural bog, but the current swamp was formed in the 1960s by a beaver dam, and many dead trees still rise from the water.
