= Cornplanter State Forest =

State forest in Pennsylvania, United States

- IUCN category VI (protected area with sustainable use of natural resources)
- Location within Pennsylvania
- Location: Pennsylvania, United States
- Coordinates: 41°52′27″N 79°09′08″W
- Area: 1,585 acres (6.41 km^{2})
- Governing body: Pennsylvania Department of Conservation and Natural Resources
- Website: Cornplanter State Forest

Cornplanter State Forest is a Pennsylvania State Forest in Pennsylvania Bureau of Forestry District #14. The main office is located in North Warren in Warren County, Pennsylvania, in the United States. It is named for Chief Cornplanter of the Seneca Nation, one of the tribes of the Iroquois Confederacy.

The forest is found on 1,585 acres (641 ha) in Crawford, Forest, and Warren Counties. The district also covers Erie and the northern part of Venango Counties.

== History ==
Cornplanter State Forest was formed as a direct result of the depletion of the forests of Pennsylvania that took place during the mid-to-late 19th century. Conservationists like Dr. Joseph Rothrock became concerned that the forests would not regrow if they were not managed properly. Lumber and Iron companies had harvested the old-growth forests for various reasons. The clear cut the forests and left behind nothing but dried tree tops and rotting stumps. The sparks of passing steam locomotives ignited wildfires that prevented the formation of second growth forests. The conservationists feared that the forest would never regrow if there was not a change in the philosophy of forest management. They called for the state to purchase land from the lumber and iron companies and the lumber and iron companies were more than willing to sell their land since that had depleted the natural resources of the forests. The changes began to take place in 1895 when Dr. Rothrock was appointed the first commissioner of the Pennsylvania Department of Forests and Waters, the forerunner of today's Pennsylvania Department of Conservation and Natural Resources. The Pennsylvania General Assembly passed a piece of legislation in 1897 that authorized the purchase of "unseated lands for forest reservations". This was the beginning of the State Forest system.

== Neighboring state forest districts ==
Lake Erie is to the north and the U.S. state of Ohio is to the west

- Susquehannock State Forest (east)
- Elk State Forest (southeast)
- Clear Creek State Forest (south)

== Nearby state parks ==
No state parks are found within the state forest, but five are found within District #14:

- Chapman State Park (Warren County)
- Erie Bluffs State Park (Erie County)
- Oil Creek State Park (Venango County)
- Presque Isle State Park (Erie County)
- Pymatuning State Park (Crawford County)

== Natural areas ==
- Anders Run Natural Area: a 96-acre (39 ha) natural area protecting 50 acres (20 ha) of old-growth forest.
