= Charles F. Lewis Natural Area =

Natural area in Pennsylvania

- Location within Pennsylvania
- Location: Indiana County, Pennsylvania
- Nearest town: Cramer
- Coordinates: 40°24′39″N 78°59′07″W
- Area: 384 acres (155 ha)

Charles F. Lewis Natural Area is a 384-acre (155 ha) protected area in Indiana County, Pennsylvania, United States. It is part of Gallitzin State Forest.

== Description ==
The Natural Area was established to protect trees at the western end of the Rager Mountain Forest Area, which constitutes second growth forest after the region was clearcut in the late 1800s. The area is named after local newspaper editor Dr. Charles Fletcher Lewis, who was the first President of the Western Pennsylvania Conservancy.

The area is traversed by a loop hiking trail (with multiple cross-connectors) that can be accessed from a parking lot on PA 403. It protects the habitats of several plants that have been classified as threatened in Pennsylvania, as well as a population of the locally threatened Allegheny woodrat, within and above a rugged gorge formed by Clark Run, which in turn flows a short distance to the Conemaugh River. The area has also been noted by journalists for offering some of the best fall foliage in Pennsylvania.
