= Black Ash Swamp Natural Area =

Natural area in Pennsylvania

- Location within Pennsylvania
- Location: Tioga County, Pennsylvania
- Nearest town: Sabinsville
- Coordinates: 41°49′03″N 77°28′08″W
- Area: 308 acres (125 ha)

Black Ash Swamp Natural Area is a 308-acre (125 ha) protected area in Tioga County, Pennsylvania, United States. It is part of Tioga State Forest and is within Asaph Wild Area.

== Description ==
The Natural Area was established to protect a bog that forms the source of the Roberts Branch of Right Asaph Run, in an area with significant beaver activity. The area preserves stands of cherry and maple trees, which are relatively uncommon in the region. The area is also known for robust populations of amphibians and songbirds.
