= Pinchot State Forest =

State forest in Pennsylvania, US

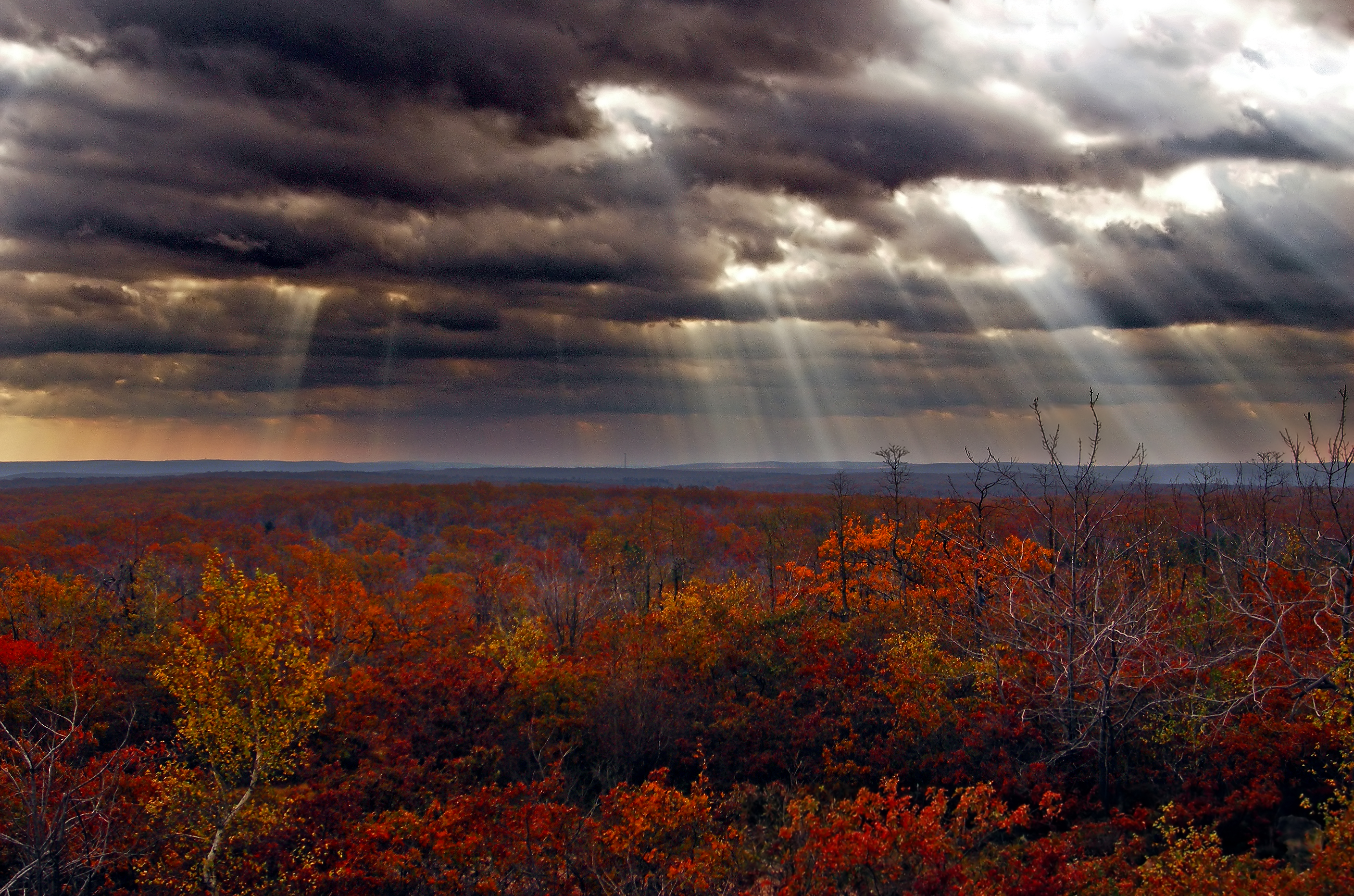
- Looking southwest from Pine Hill, Pinchot State Forest, Luzerne and Lackawanna Counties

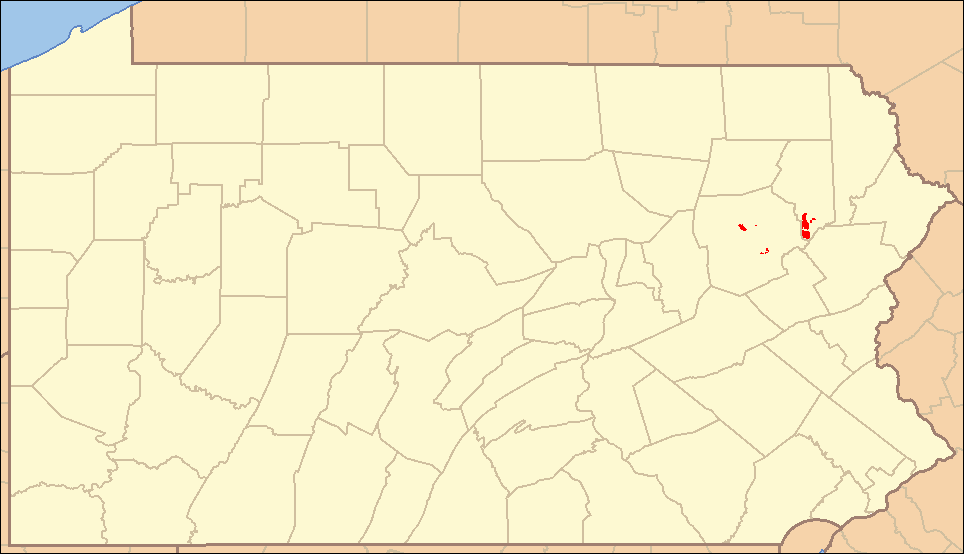
- Location of Pinchot State Forest in Pennsylvania
- Location: Pennsylvania, United States
- Coordinates: 41°34′10″N 75°42′30″W
- Area: 49,635 acres (200.87 km^{2})
- Elevation: 2,265 ft (690 m)
- Established: 1902
- Named for: Gifford Pinchot
- Governing body: Pennsylvania Department of Conservation and Natural Resources
- Website: Pinchot State Forest

Pinchot State Forest is a Pennsylvania State Forest in Pennsylvania Bureau of Forestry District #11. The main offices are located in Lackawanna State Park in North Abington Township in Lackawanna County, Pennsylvania, in the United States.

The forest is located on several tracts in Lackawanna, Luzerne, Wyoming, Susquehanna, and Wayne counties. As of February 8, 2022, the total area is 49,635 acres (20,087 ha). Spruce Swamp Natural Area receives extra protection.

The reorganization of Pennsylvania State Forests that took effect 1 July 2005, added the southern part of Luzerne County to District #11 (it was previously in the defunct Wyoming State Forest). Other aspects of the realignment include moving the District #11 office from Scranton 10 miles (16 km) north to Lackawanna State Park, and the acquisition of a new tract, "Theta Forest" (not included in the description above).

== History ==
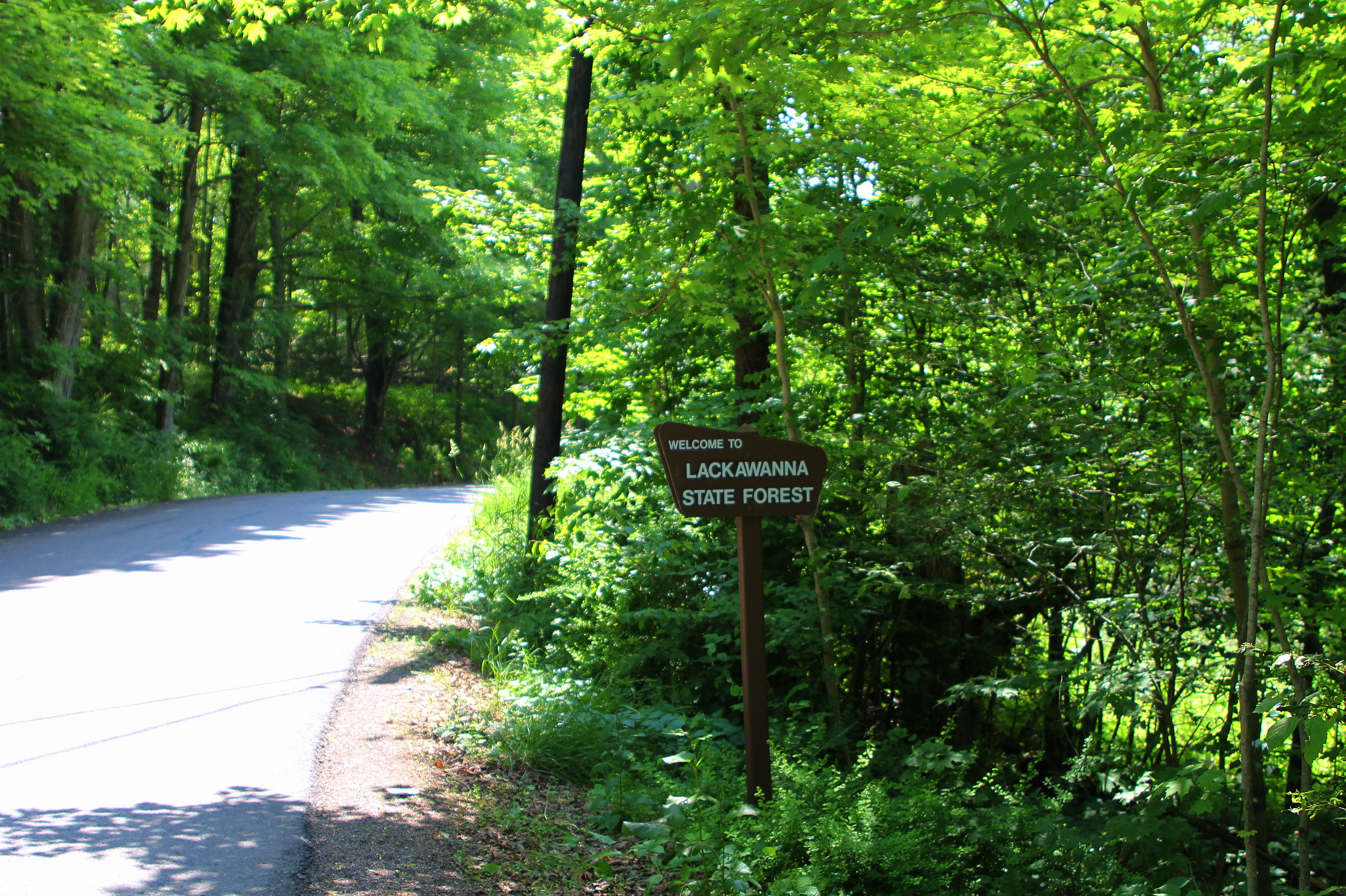
Entering the Lackawanna State Forest

=== Depletion of natural resources ===
Pinchot State Forest was formed in response to the depletion of the forests of Pennsylvania during the mid-to-late 19th century. Conservationists like Dr. Joseph Rothrock feared that the forests would not regrow if they were not managed properly. Lumber and Iron companies had harvested the old-growth forests on a massive scale. They clear cut the forests and left behind nothing but dried tree tops and rotting stumps. The sparks of passing steam locomotives ignited wildfires that prevented the formation of second growth forests. Conservationists feared that the forest would never regrow if there was not a change in the philosophy of forest management. They called for the state to purchase land from the lumber and iron companies and the lumber and iron companies were more than willing to sell their land since that had depleted the natural resources of the forests.

=== Legislative response ===
A change began in 1895 when Dr. Rothrock was appointed the first commissioner of the Pennsylvania Department of Forests and Waters, the forerunner of today's Pennsylvania Department of Conservation and Natural Resources. The Pennsylvania General Assembly passed legislation in 1897 that authorized the purchase of "unseated lands for forest reservations." This was the beginning of the State Forest system. Pinchot State Forest began a few years later, in 1902, with the purchase of 2,854 acres (1,155 ha) of land in Thornhurst Township, Lackawanna County, from William and Catherine McMurtry for $3,567.40. It was originally known as Lackawanna State Forest.

=== Expansion and renaming ===
Since 2005, the state forest has expanded from 7,735 acres (3,130 ha) to 49,635 acres (20,087 ha). Added tracts include 3,183 acres (1,288 ha) in Mocanaqua, the 540-acre (220 ha) Seven Tubs Recreation Area, 862 acres (349 ha) at Deep Hollow, the 1,210-acre (490 ha) Moon Lake State Forest Recreation Area, 7,683 acres (3,109 ha) on Montage Mountain, and 528 acres (214 ha) in the Thornhurst section in Lackawanna County. In 2015, Lackawanna State Forest was renamed Pinchot State Forest in honor of Gifford Pinchot.

== Gallery ==
A view of Lackawanna and Luzerne Counties from Pine Hill (in Pinchot State Forest):

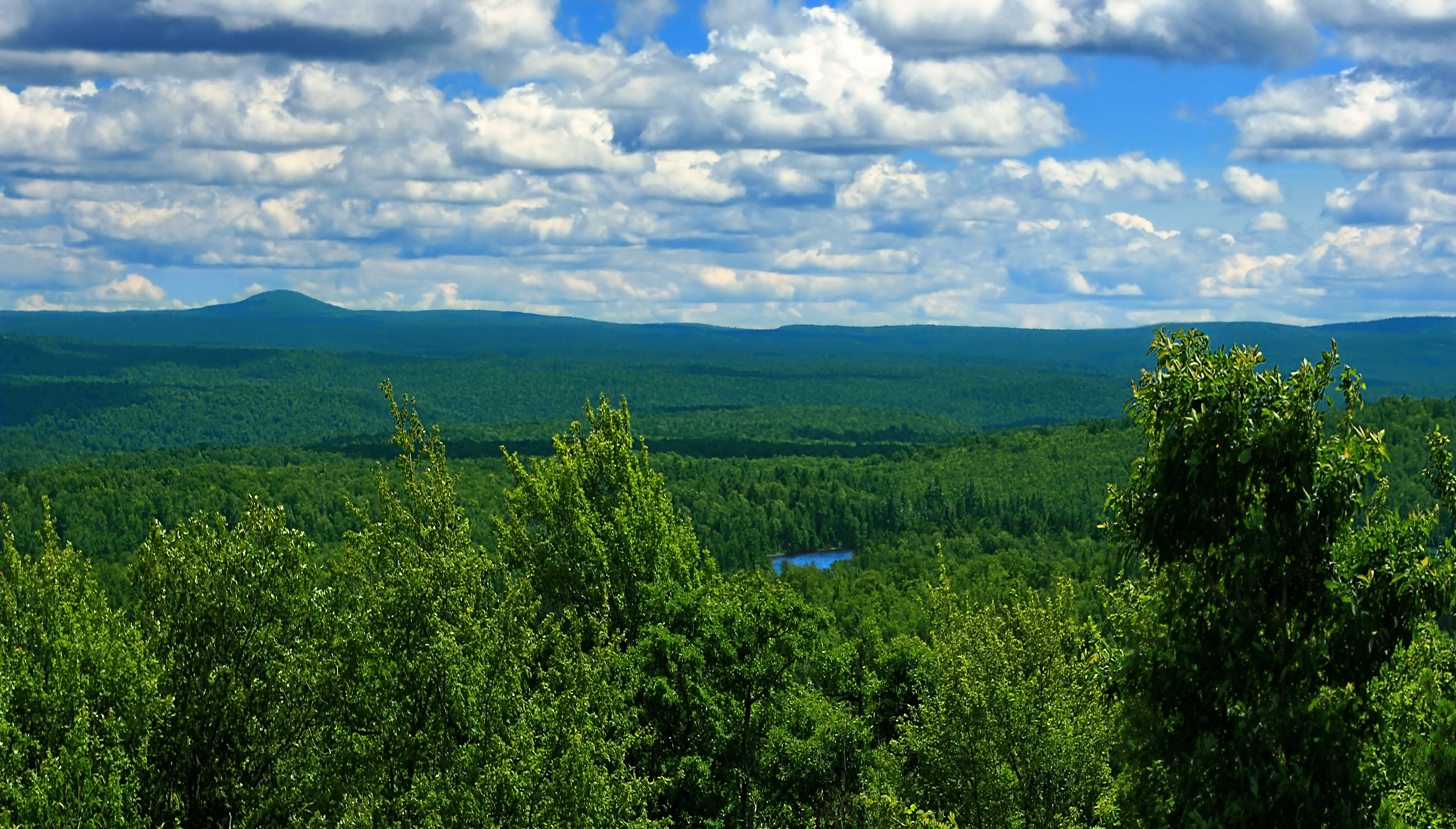

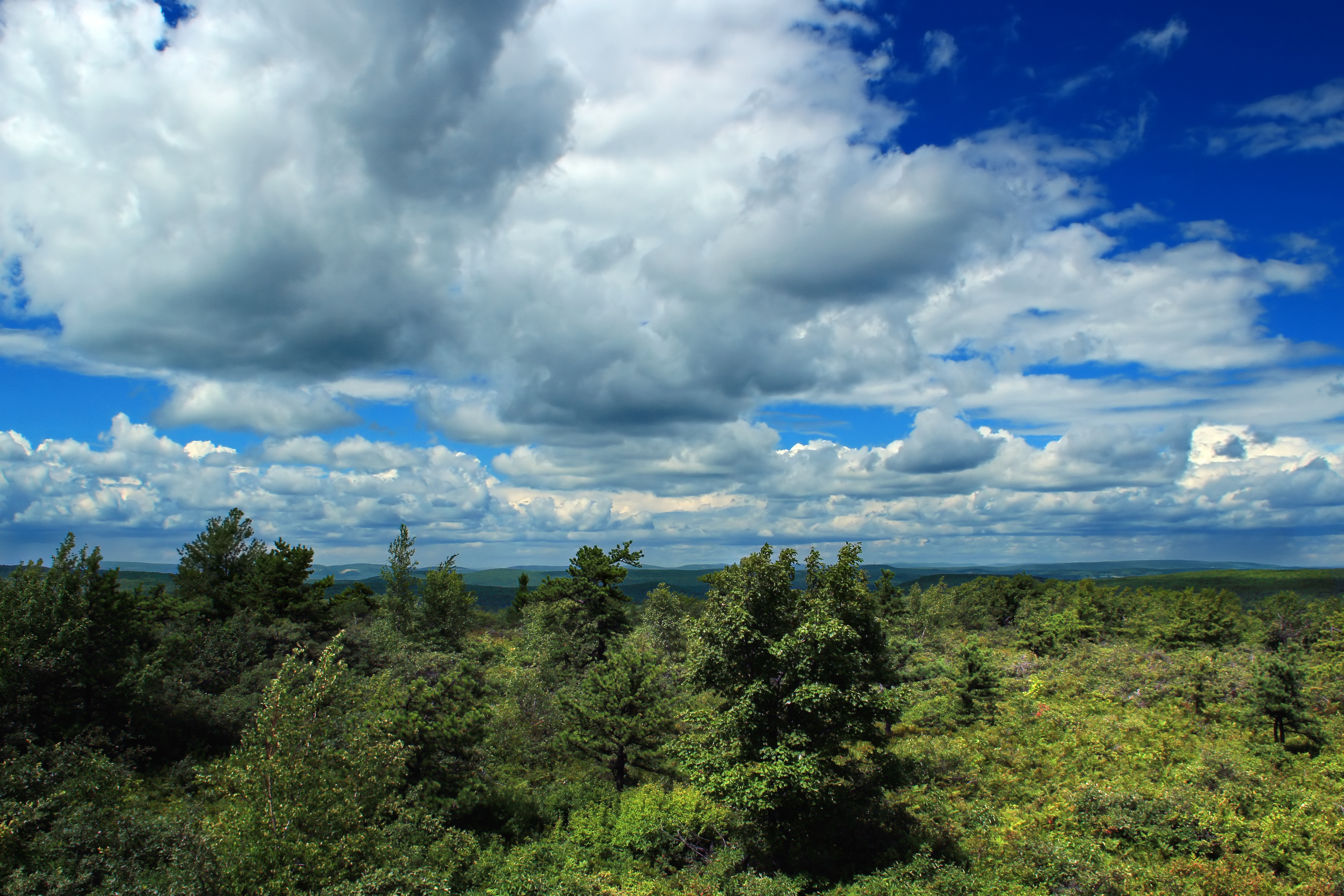

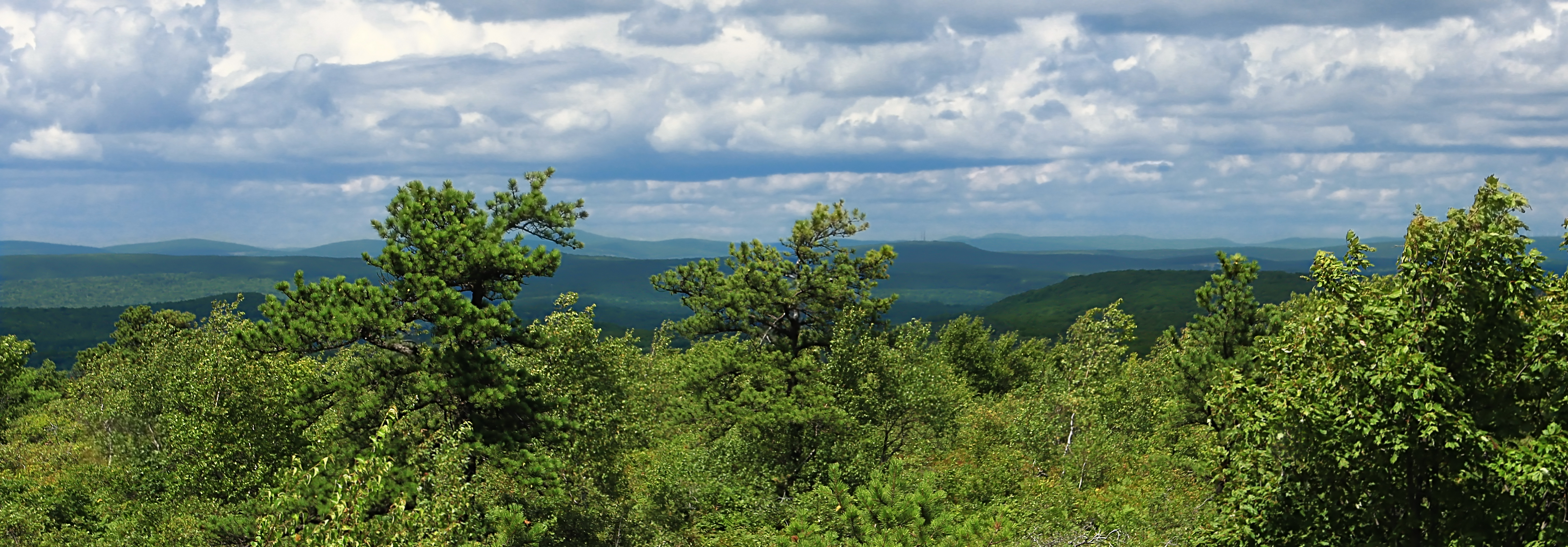

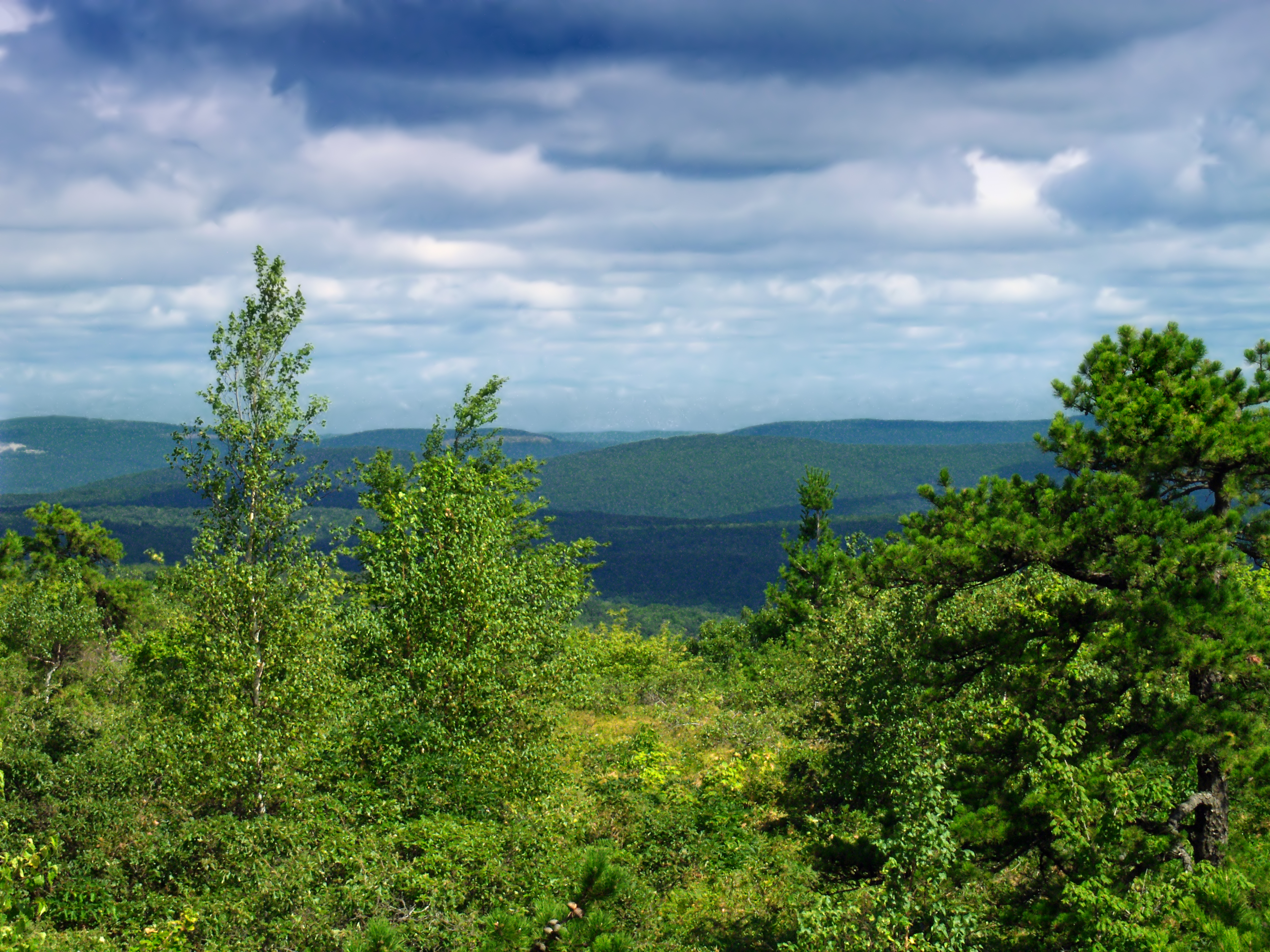

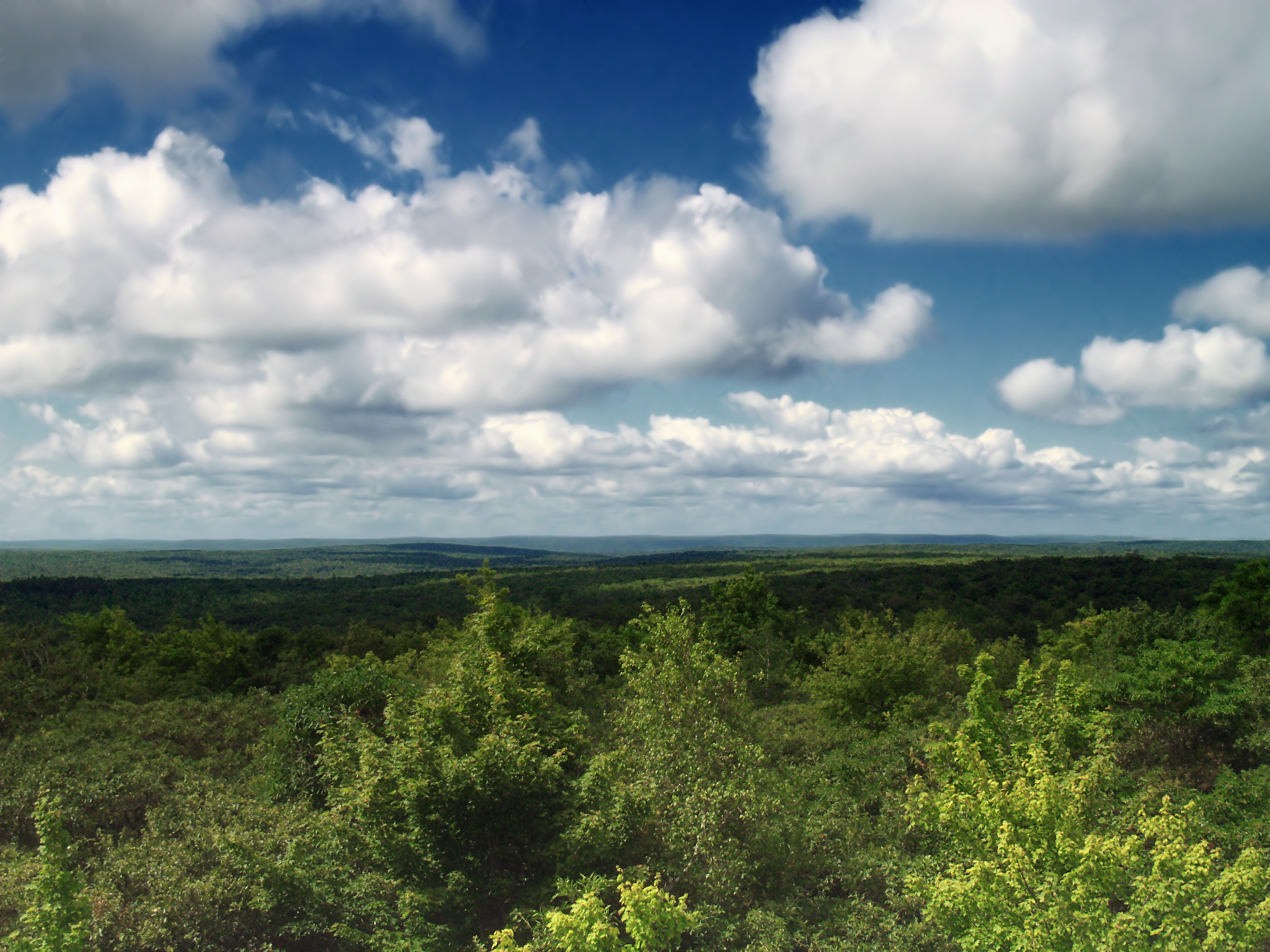

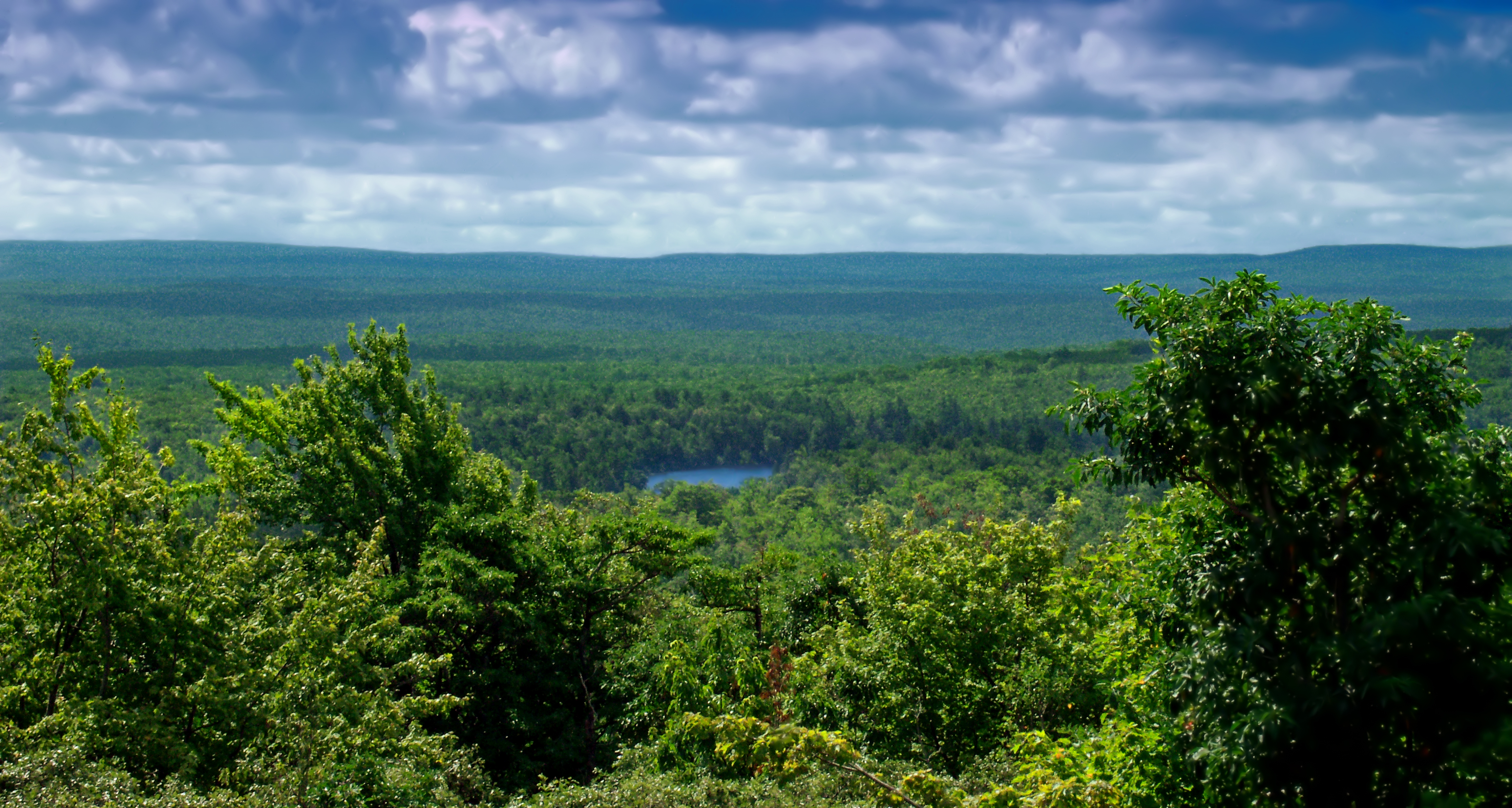

== Neighboring state forest districts ==
The U.S. states of New York and New Jersey are to the north and east, respectively.

- Delaware State Forest (southeast)
- Weiser State Forest (south)
- Loyalsock State Forest (west)

== Nearby state parks ==
- Archbald Pothole State Park in Lackawanna County
- Lackawanna State Park in Lackawanna County
- Prompton State Park in Wayne County
- Salt Springs State Park in Susquehanna County
- Varden Conservation Area in Wayne County
