= Tioga State Forest =

State forest in Pennsylvania, United States

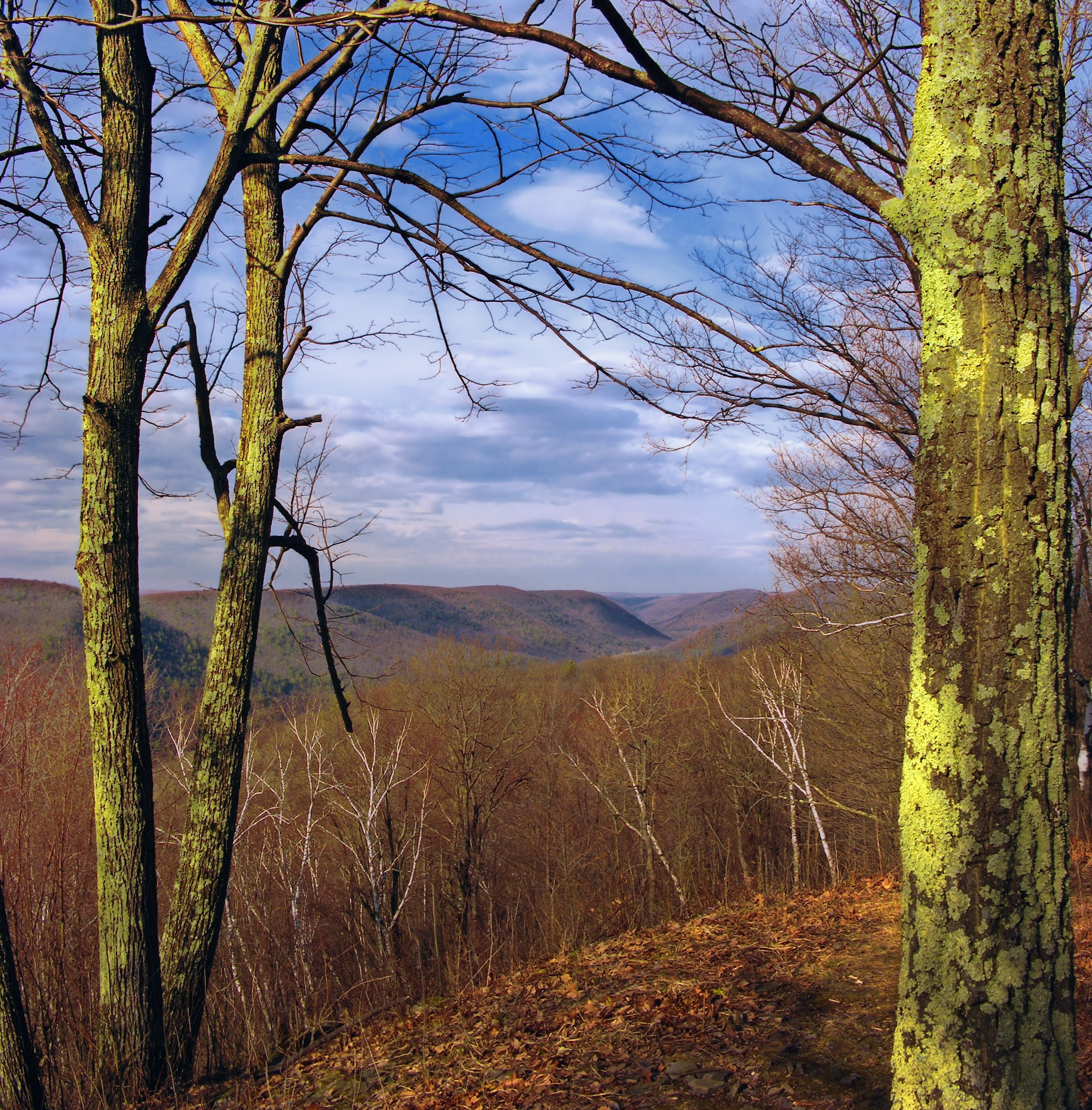
- Babb Creek Canyon, Tioga County, as seen from the Mid State Trail at Gillespie Point.

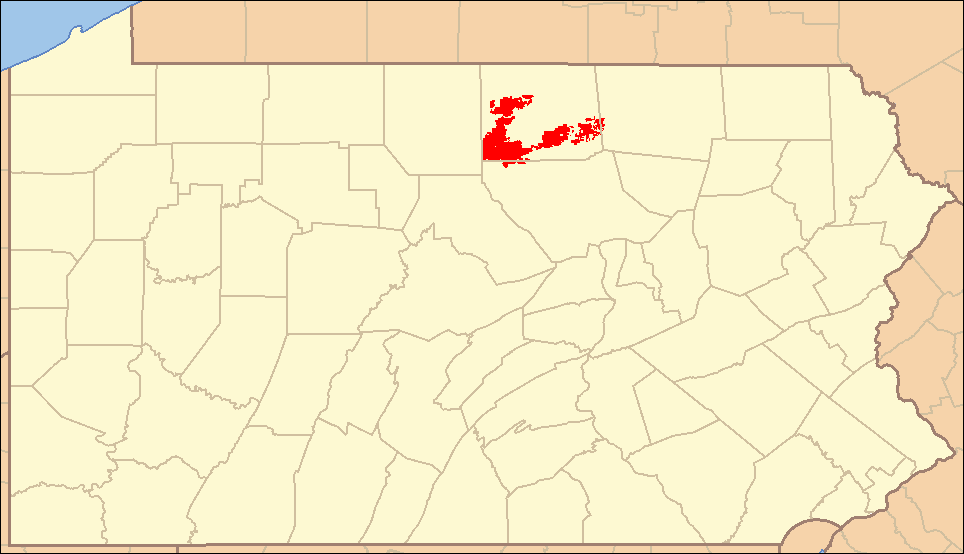
- Location of Tioga State Forest in Pennsylvania
- Location: Pennsylvania, United States
- Coordinates: 41°46′37″N 77°30′50″W
- Area: 164,975 acres (667.63 km^{2})
- Elevation: 2,119 ft (646 m)
- Established: 1900
- Named for: Tioga River
- Governing body: Pennsylvania Department of Conservation and Natural Resources
- Website: Tioga State Forest

Tioga State Forest is a Pennsylvania State Forest in District #16, in the Allegheny Plateau region within Tioga County, Pennsylvania.

The main offices are located in Wellsboro in Tioga County, Pennsylvania in the United States.

The state forest was named for the Tioga tribe of the Seneca, a Native American people, whose homeland was in the region. The Seneca language word "Tioga" means 'the meeting of two rivers' in English.

Prior to the July 1, 2005 realignment of Pennsylvania State Forest Districts, Tioga State Forest included almost all state forest lands in Tioga County and Bradford County, and encompassed 160,000 acres (64,750 ha). After realignment, the state forest tracts in Bradford County became part of the new Loyalsock State Forest. Currently, the forest is mostly located in Tioga County and only includes small areas within Bradford and Lycoming Counties.

== History ==
Tioga State Forest was formed as a direct result of the depletion of the forests of Pennsylvania that took place during the mid-to-late 19th century. Conservationists like Dr. Joseph Rothrock became concerned that the forests would not regrow if they were not managed properly. Lumber and iron companies harvested the old-growth forests, clearcutting the forests and leaving behind nothing but dried tree tops and rotting stumps. The sparks of passing steam locomotives ignited wildfires that prevented the formation of second growth forests. The conservationists feared that the forest would never regrow if there was not a change in the philosophy of forest management. They called for the state to purchase land from the lumber and iron companies and the lumber and iron companies were more than willing to sell their land since that had depleted the natural resources of the forests. The changes began to take place in 1895 when Dr. Rothrock was appointed the first commissioner of the Pennsylvania Department of Forests and Waters, the forerunner of today's Pennsylvania Department of Conservation and Natural Resources. The Pennsylvania General Assembly passed a piece of legislation in 1897 that authorized the purchase of "unseated lands for forest reservations." This was the beginning of the State Forest system.

Most of the land acquired by the Commonwealth of Pennsylvania was purchased from land holding and lumber companies. The lumber companies had stripped the land of vast stands of old growth Eastern hemlock and white pine during the lumber era that swept throughout the mountains of Pennsylvania during the mid-to-late 19th century. The harvested timber was floated down Pine Creek and its tributaries to the Susquehanna Boom on the West Branch Susquehanna River near Williamsport. The lumber companies left behind a land that was stripped of most of its trees and was scattered with tree stumps and the dried tops of trees that easily igniting causing wildfires that slowed the growth of the now thriving second growth forest of hardwoods.

The establishment of the Civilian Conservation Corps during the Great Depression by President Franklin D. Roosevelt was vital to the recovery of the forests of Tioga State Forest. Several CCC camps were scattered throughout Tioga State Forest. The young men of the CCC worked to clear the forest and streams of dried underbrush. They cleared roads and trails throughout the forest and built the recreation facilities found at Leonard Harrison and Colton Point State Parks along the Pennsylvania Grand Canyon.

Birch trees in Tioga State Forest were used during the mid-20th century in the birch oil industry. Birch stills were built throughout the forest to produce the oil, which was used as an industrial lubricant. The last birch still in Tioga State Forest was shut down in 1972.

== Neighboring state forest districts ==
The U.S. state of New York is to the north

- Loyalsock State Forest (east and southeast)
- Tiadaghton State Forest (south)
- Susquehannock State Forest (west)

== Nearby state parks ==
- Leonard Harrison State Park (Tioga County)
- Colton Point State Park (Tioga County)
- Hills Creek State Park (Tioga County)

== Natural and wild areas ==
- Black Ash Swamp Natural Area
- Pine Creek Gorge Natural Area
- Reynolds Spring Natural Area
- Asaph Wild Area
