= Bald Eagle State Forest =

State forest in Pennsylvania, United States

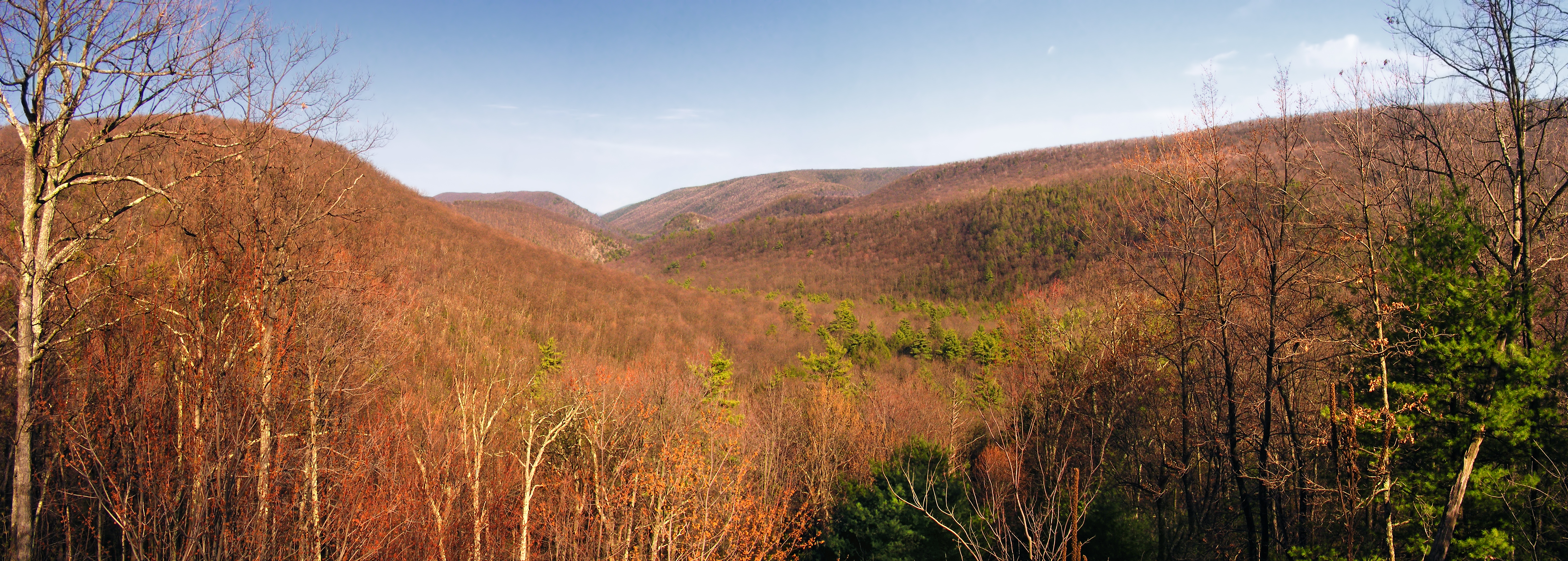
- Bald Eagle State Forest vista from Pine Swamp Road in Centre County

- Location within Pennsylvania
- Location: Pennsylvania, U.S.
- Coordinates: 40°53′16″N 77°39′22″W
- Area: 194,602 acres (787.53 km^{2})
- Elevation: 1,788 ft (545 m)
- Governing body: Pennsylvania Department of Conservation and Natural Resources
- Website: https://www.dcnr.pa.gov/StateForests/FindAForest/BaldEagle/Pages/default.aspx

Bald Eagle State Forest is a Pennsylvania state forest in Pennsylvania Bureau of Forestry District #7. The main office is located in Laurelton in Union County, Pennsylvania. The forest is found in Centre, Clinton, Mifflin, Snyder, and Union Counties. Bald Eagle shares a common border on its western extent with Rothrock State Forest and on its northern extent with Tiadaghton State Forest.

Five Pennsylvania State Parks are contained within the forest: Poe Valley, Poe Paddy, R. B. Winter, Reeds Gap, and Sand Bridge, as well as two former state parks: Snyder-Middleswarth Natural Area (formerly Snyder-Middleswarth State Park) and Hairy Johns Picnic Area (formerly a state park known as both "Hairy John's State Forest Park" and "Voneida State Forest Park").

== History ==
Bald Eagle State Forest was formed as a direct result of the depletion of the forests of Pennsylvania that took place during the mid-to-late 19th century. Conservationists like Dr. Joseph Rothrock became concerned that the forests would not regrow if they were not managed properly. Lumber and Iron companies had harvested the old-growth forests for various reasons. They clear cut the forests and left behind nothing but dried tree tops and rotting stumps.

The sparks of passing steam locomotives ignited wildfires that prevented the formation of second growth forests. The conservationists feared that the forest would never regrow if there was not a change in the philosophy of forest management. They called for the state to purchase land from the lumber and iron companies and the lumber and iron companies were more than willing to sell their land since that had depleted the natural resources of the forests.

The changes began to take place in 1895 when Dr. Rothrock was appointed the first commissioner of the Pennsylvania Department of Forests and Waters, the forerunner of today's Pennsylvania Department of Conservation and Natural Resources. The Pennsylvania General Assembly passed a piece of legislation in 1897 that authorized the purchase of "unseated lands for forest reservations." This was the beginning of the State Forest system.

== Recreation ==
The forest offers a wide variety of recreational activities.

- Hiking
- Mountain Biking
- Picnicking
- Fishing
- Hunting
- Camping
- Horseback Riding
- Cross Country Skiing
- ATV Riding
- Snowmobiling

=== Horse riding ===
Horses may be ridden on most of the forest's shared-use trails, which exceed 300 miles, and the state forest roads. Horses are not permitted on the Mid State Trail (MST), District hiking trails (yellow blaze), or in Natural Areas. Trails range from easy to very difficult, and some may not be suitable due to difficult terrain. The forest features the Central Mountains Shared Use Trail, a network of 120 miles of trails for hiking, biking, and horses. Several motorized campsites in the forest are suited to camping with horses.

== Events ==
Various events are held in Bald Eagle each year including the Wilderness 101, a 101-mile (163 km) mountain bike race.

== Neighboring state forest districts ==
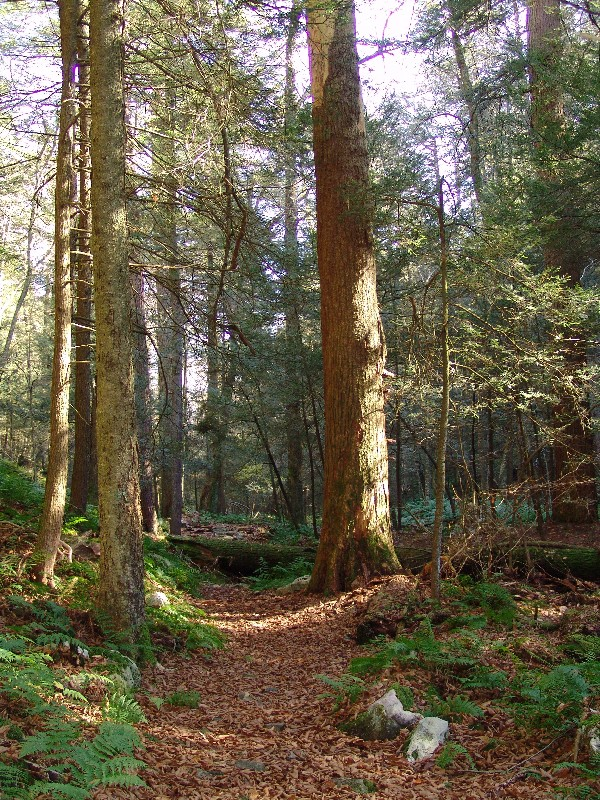
- Old growth hemlocks at Snyder Middleswarth
  Tiadaghton State Forest (north)
- Weiser State Forest (east)
- Tuscarora State Forest (south)
- Rothrock State Forest (southwest)
- Sproul State Forest (northwest)

== Other attractions ==
=== Hiking ===
- Mid State Trail

=== Natural and wild areas ===
- Joyce Kilmer Natural Area
- The Hook Natural Area
- Mt. Logan Natural Area
- Rosecrans Bog Natural Area
- Snyder Middleswarth Natural Area
- Tall Timbers Natural Area
- Penns Creek Wild Area
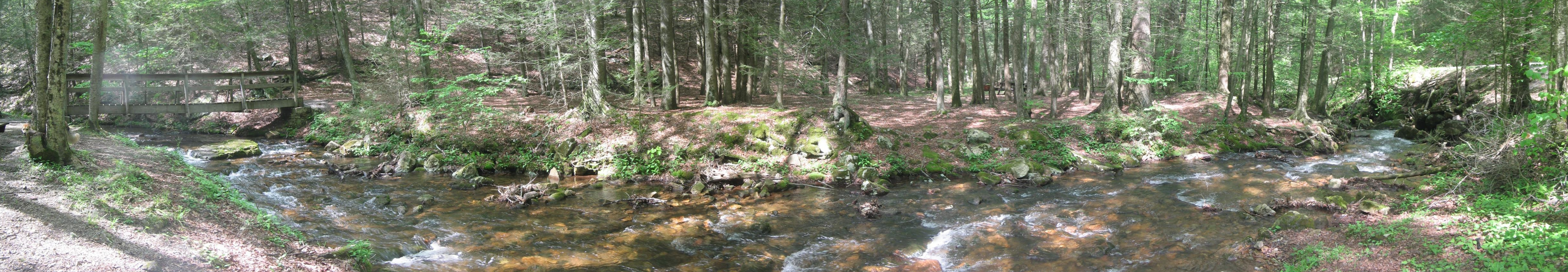
Swift Run in the High Rock picnic area of the Snyder Middleswarth Natural Area in May 2009
