= Gallitzin State Forest =

State forest in Pennsylvania, US

- IUCN category VI (protected area with sustainable use of natural resources)
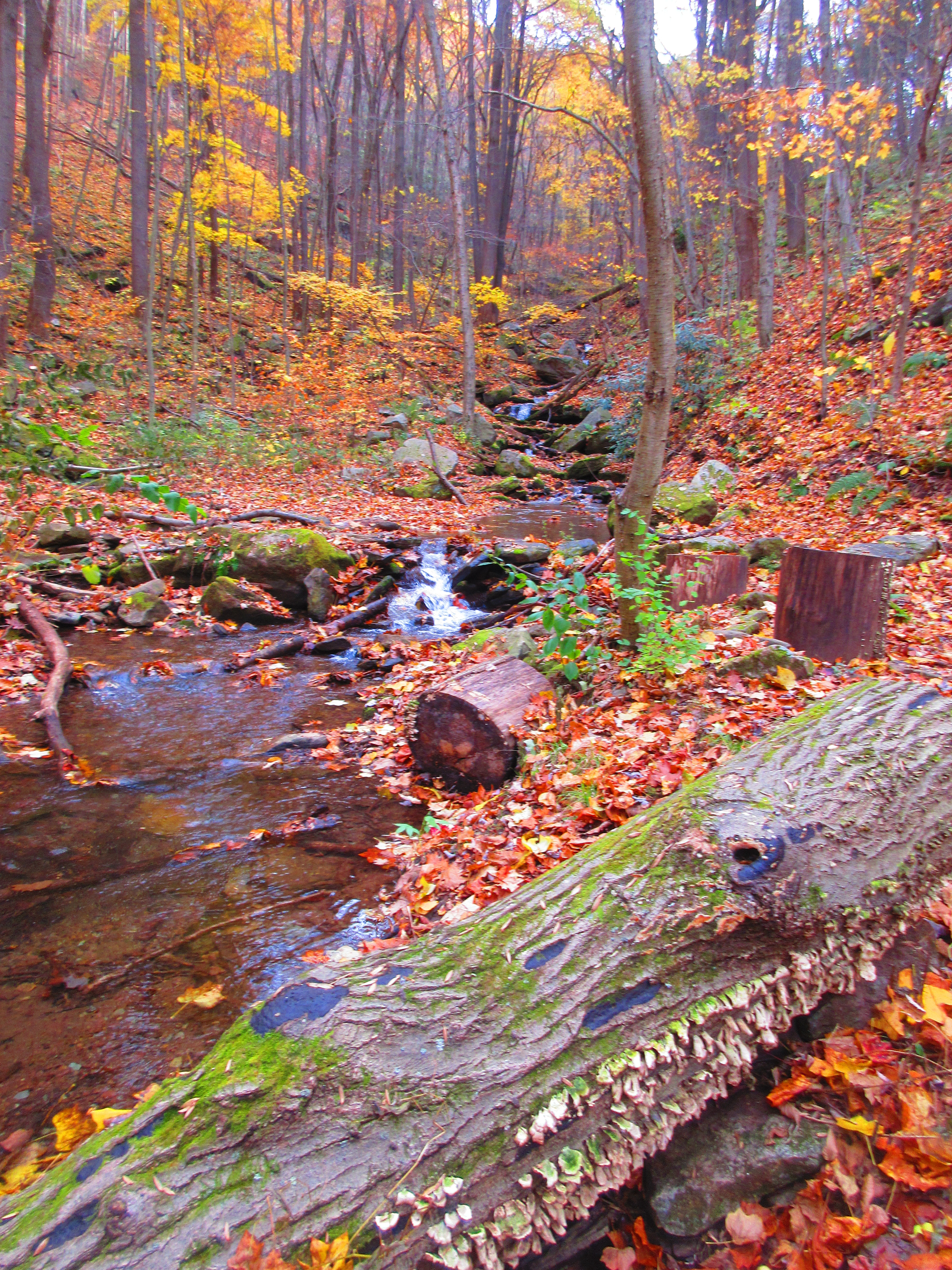
- Autumn in Charles F. Lewis Natural Area

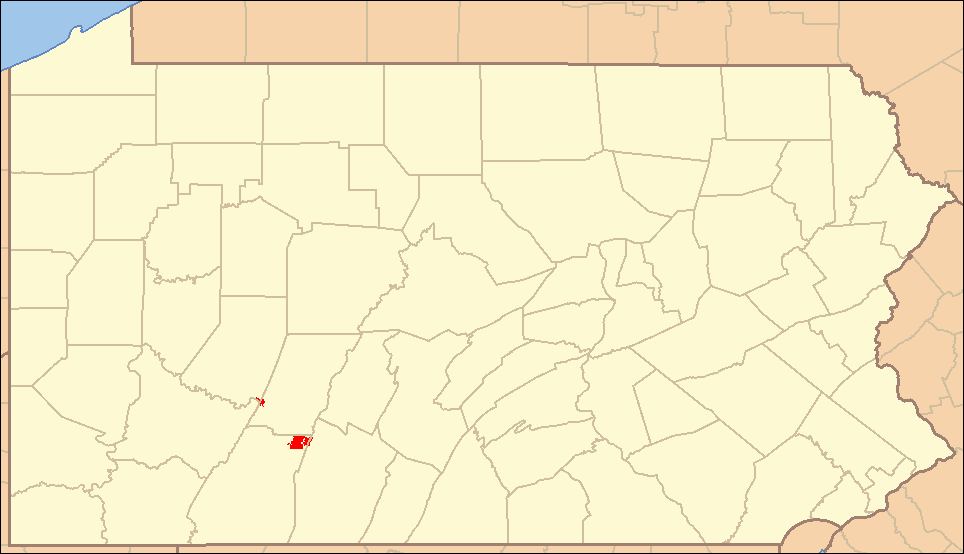
- Location of Gallitzin State Forest in Pennsylvania
- Location: Pennsylvania, United States
- Coordinates: 40°12′30″N 78°42′29″W
- Area: 24,370 acres (98.6 km^{2})
- Elevation: 2,402 ft (732 m)
- Established: 1916
- Governing body: Pennsylvania Department of Conservation and Natural Resources
- Website: Gallitzin State Forest

Gallitzin State Forest is a Pennsylvania State Forest in Pennsylvania Bureau of Forestry District #6. The main offices are located in Ebensburg in Cambria County, Pennsylvania in the United States.

The forest is located on 24,370 acres (9,860 ha) in two non-contiguous tracts. The largest tract is the Babcock Division in northern Somerset and northwestern Bedford Counties. The other, smaller tract is in northern Cambria and Indiana Counties. The state forest includes Charles F. Lewis Natural Area and Clear Shade Wild Area.

Gallitzin State Forest was named to honor Demetrius Augustine Gallitzin. Gallitzin was a Roman Catholic priest and is called The Apostle of the Alleghenies for his pioneering mission work in the area in the early 19th century.

== History ==
Gallitzin State Forest was established in 1916 in response to large scale deforestation that took place during the mid-to-late 19th century. Conservationists like Dr. Joseph Rothrock became concerned that the forests would not regrow if they were not managed properly. Lumber and Iron companies had harvested the old-growth forests for various reasons. The clear cut the forests and left behind nothing but dried tree tops and rotting stumps. The sparks of passing steam locomotives ignited wildfires that prevented the formation of second growth forests. The conservationists feared that the forest would never regrow if there was not a change in the philosophy of forest management. They called for the state to purchase land from the lumber and iron companies and the lumber and iron companies were more than willing to sell their land since that had depleted the natural resources of the forests. The changes began to take place in 1895 when Dr. Rothrock was appointed the first commissioner of the Pennsylvania Department of Forests and Waters, the forerunner of today's Pennsylvania Department of Conservation and Natural Resources. The Pennsylvania General Assembly passed a piece of legislation in 1897 that authorized the purchase of "unseated lands for forest reservations". This was the beginning of the State Forest system.

== Environment ==
Gallitzin State Forest protects part of the Appalachian mixed mesophytic forests ecoregion. The forest is located at the western edge of the Allegheny Plateau, at elevations of about 2,400 feet (730 m) above sea level. This is in the lower reaches of an alpine-type climate, and species such as birch trees, more common further north in New England and Canada, may be found in the forest.

== Nearby state parks ==
- Blue Knob State Park
- Laurel Ridge State Park
