= Bark Cabin Natural Area =

Natural area in Pennsylvania

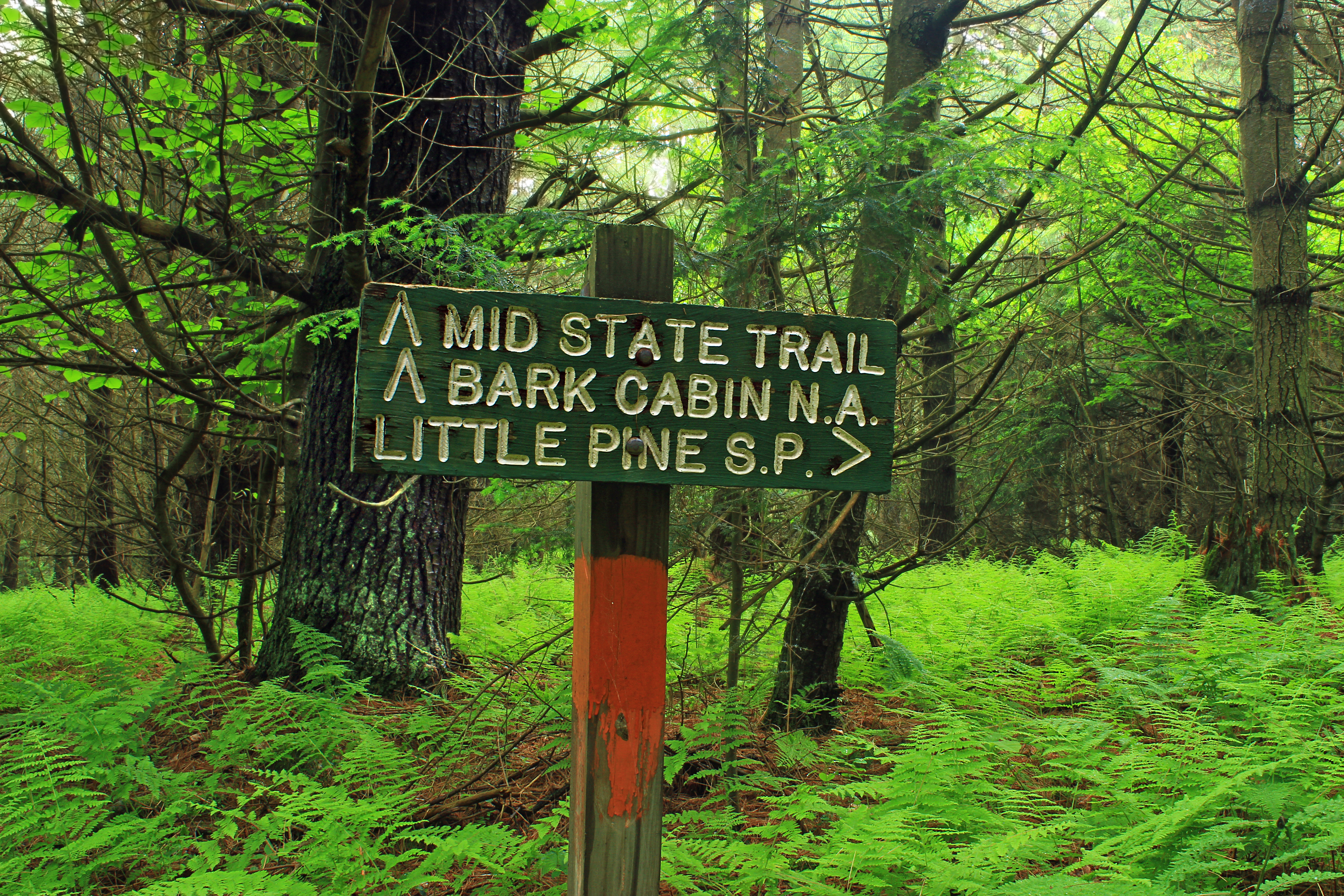
- Approaching Bark Cabin Natural Area via the Mid State Trail

- Location within Pennsylvania
- Location: Lycoming County, Pennsylvania
- Nearest town: Waterville
- Coordinates: 41°25′08″N 77°23′04″W
- Area: 7 acres (2.8 ha)

Bark Cabin Natural Area is an 84-acre (34 ha) protected area in Lycoming County, Pennsylvania, United States. It is part of Tiadaghton State Forest.

The Natural Area protects a copse of old growth trees, including black cherry and aspen trees which are relatively uncommon in the region. The area can only be accessed by hiking in on the Mid State Trail from a nearby gravel road.
