= Little Pine State Park =

State park in Pennsylvania, United States

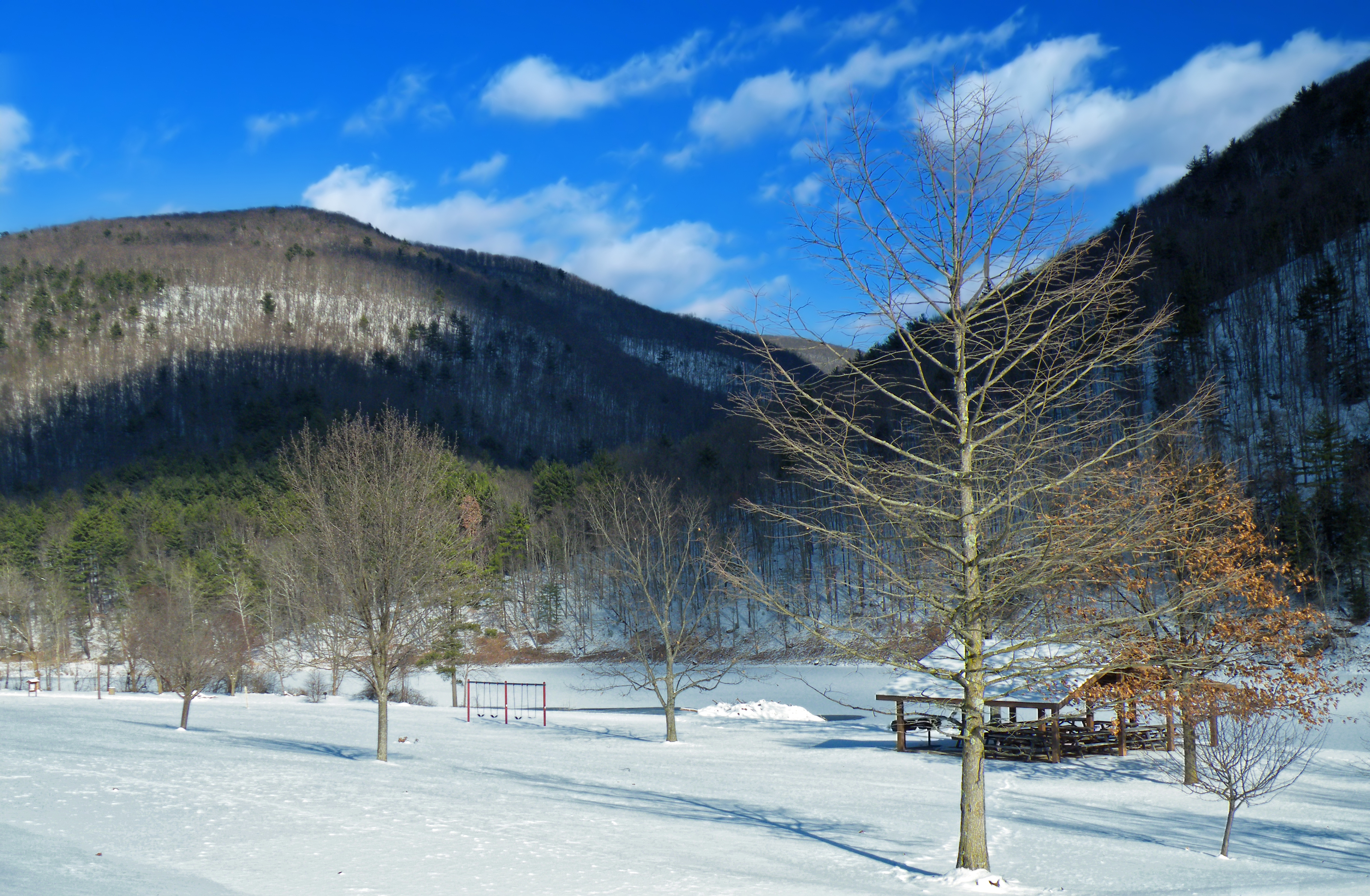

- Location within Pennsylvania Location within the United States
- Interactive map of Little Pine State Park
- Location: Cummings Township, Lycoming County, Pennsylvania, United States
- Coordinates: 41°21′49″N 77°21′27″W
- Area: 2,158 acres (873 ha)
- Elevation: 710 feet (220 m)
- Established: 1937
- Administrator: Pennsylvania Department of Conservation and Natural Resources
- Visitors: 87,418 (in 2008)
- Website: Official website
- Pennsylvania State Parks

Little Pine State Park is a Pennsylvania state park on 2,158 acres (873 ha) in Cummings Township, Lycoming County, Pennsylvania in the United States. Little Pine State park is along 4.2 miles (6.8 km) of Little Pine Creek, a tributary of Pine Creek, in the midst of the Tiadaghton State Forest. A dam on the creek has created a lake covering 94 acres (38 ha) for fishing, boating, and swimming. The park is on Pennsylvania Route 4001, 4 miles (6.4 km) northeast of the unincorporated village of Waterville or 8 miles (13 km) southwest of the village of English Center. The nearest borough is Jersey Shore, Pennsylvania, about 15 miles (24 km) south at the mouth of Pine Creek on the West Branch Susquehanna River.

== History ==
=== Native Americans ===
Humans have lived in what is now Pennsylvania since at least 10,000 BC. The first settlers were Paleo-Indian nomadic hunters known from their stone tools. The hunter-gatherers of the Archaic period, which lasted locally from 7000 to 1000 BC, used a greater variety of more sophisticated stone artifacts. The Woodland period marked the gradual transition to semi-permanent villages and horticulture, between 1000 BC and 1500 AD. Archeological evidence found in the state from this time includes a range of pottery types and styles, burial mounds, pipes, bows and arrows, and ornaments.

Little Pine State Park is in the West Branch Susquehanna River drainage basin, the earliest recorded inhabitants of which were the Iroquoian-speaking Susquehannocks. They were a matriarchal society that lived in stockaded villages of large long houses, and "occasionally inhabited" the mountains surrounding the Pine Creek Gorge. Their numbers were greatly reduced by disease and warfare with the Five Nations of the Iroquois, and by 1675 they had died out, moved away, or been assimilated into other tribes.

To fill the void left by the demise of the Susquehannocks, the Iroquois encouraged displaced tribes from the east to settle in the West Branch watershed, including the Shawnee and Lenape (or Delaware). The Pine Creek and Little Pine Creek valleys in Cummings Township were used by the Iroquois and Algonkian tribes as a hunting ground. Historians believe that there may have been a Shawnee village and burial ground just to the north of Little Pine State Park on Little Pine Creek.

The French and Indian War (1754–1763) led to the migration of many Native Americans westward to the Ohio River basin. The United States acquired the Last Purchase, including what is now Little Pine State Park, from the Iroquois in the Second Treaty of Fort Stanwix in October 1784. In the years that followed, Native Americans almost entirely left Pennsylvania; however some isolated bands of Natives remained in Pine Creek Gorge until the War of 1812.

=== Lumber era ===
The first settlers in the Little Pine valley arrived in 1782. John and James English. The English brothers built two sawmills on Little Pine Creek in 1809. Their business grew over the years and by 1816 the village of English Mills was established to house the loggers and their families. The Carson and Patterson families were other early settlers who were involved in farming and the lumber industry. By the mid-19th century greater demand for lumber reached the Little Pine area, where white pine and hemlock covered the surrounding mountainsides. Lumbermen, working for large lumber companies, came and harvested the trees and sent them down the creeks to the West Branch Susquehanna River to the log boom and sawmills at Williamsport. The lumber era at Little Pine lasted until 1909, when the last log raft was floated down Little Pine Creek. Remnants of the lumber era can be seen today in and around the park.

=== Civilian Conservation Corps ===
In 1933 a picnic area was built along Little Pine Creek by the Civilian Conservation Corps at what is now the park (but was then CCC Camp S-129). The CCC camp closed in 1937 and the picnic area came under the control of the Pennsylvania Bureau of State Parks. In 1950, the dam was built for both flood control and recreational purposes. The swimming area, beach, family camping area, and more picnic facilities were added in 1958. Hurricane Agnes destroyed much of the park's infrastructure in 1972, but improvements and new facilities were constructed along with rebuilding. In 2005 the lake was drained, debris removed, and maintenance work was done on the dam. Nearby Upper Pine Bottom State Park is maintained by staff from Little Pine State Park.

== Ecology ==
Descriptions from early explorers and settlers give an idea of what the Little Pine Creek area was like before it was clearcut. The forest was up to 85 percent hemlock and white pine; hardwoods made up the rest. The Pine Creek watershed, which Little Pine Creek is part of, was home to large predators such as wolves, lynx, wolverines, panthers, fishers, bobcats and foxes; all except the last three are locally extinct as of 2007. The area had herds of American bison, elk and white-tailed deer, and large numbers of black bears, river otters, and beavers. Rattlesnakes and insects plagued early explorers and settlers in the region. Bald eagles have been nesting at the park since 2004. The breeding pair returns annually to a nest on the lakeshore.

The virgin forests cooled the land and streams, and centuries of accumulated organic matter in the forest soil caused slow percolation of rainfall into the creeks and runs so that they flowed more evenly year-round. Pine Creek and its tributaries were home to large numbers of fish, including trout, but dams downstream on the Susquehanna River have eliminated the shad and eels once found here by blocking their migrations. Habitat for land animals was destroyed by the clearcutting of forests, but there was also a great deal of hunting, with bounties paid for large predators.

Little Pine Creek's virgin white pines were all clearcut, but in 1925 the Department of Forests and Waters reported "thrifty young growth has now taken in its place". In the 1920s chestnut blight killed almost all the American chestnut trees in the Tiadaghton State Forest, and oak trees suffered from oak leaf tier moths in the 1950s and oak leaf roller moths in 1967. Gypsy moths defoliated the state forest between 1978 and 1982. As of 2009 the surrounding state forest is "dominated by mixed oak forests", along with hardwoods such as ash, beech, birch, cherry, and maple, as well as hemlock and pine. The Pine Creek Gorge is home to over 225 species of wildflowers, plants and trees, 40 species of mammals, 245 species of birds, and 26 species of fish. Common animals include deer, squirrels, bear, eagles, wild turkey, and ravens.

== Geology and climate ==
Although the rock formations exposed in Little State Park and the Pine Creek Gorge are at least 300 million years old, the gorge itself formed about 20,000 years ago, in the last ice age. Pine Creek had flowed northeasterly until then, but was dammed by rocks, soil, ice, and other debris deposited by the receding Laurentide Continental Glacier. The dammed creek formed a lake near what would later be the village of Ansonia in Shippen Township in Tioga County, and the lake's glacial meltwater overflowed the debris dam, reversing the flow of Pine Creek. The creek flooded to the south and quickly carved a deep channel on its way to the West Branch Susquehanna River.

The land on which Little Pine State Park sits was part of the coastline of a shallow sea that covered a great portion of what is now North America about 300 million years ago, in the Pennsylvanian subperiod. The high mountains to the east of the sea gradually eroded, causing a buildup of sediment made up primarily of clay, sand and gravel. Tremendous pressure on the sediment caused the formation of the rocks that are found today in the Pine Creek drainage basin: sandstone, shale, conglomerates, limestone, and coal.

The park is at an elevation of 710 feet (220 m) on the Allegheny Plateau, which formed in the Alleghenian orogeny some 300 million years ago, when the part of Gondwana that became Africa collided with what became North America, forming Pangaea. Although the gorge and its surroundings seem to be mountainous, the area is a dissected plateau. Years of erosion have cut away the soft rocks, forming the valleys, and left the hardest of the ancient rocks relatively untouched on the top of sharp ridges, giving them the appearance of "mountains".

Five major rock formations from the Devonian and Carboniferous periods are present in Little Pine State Park and Cummings Township. The youngest of these, which forms the highest points in the township, is the early Pennsylvanian Pottsville Formation, a gray conglomerate that may contain sandstone, siltstone, and shale, as well as anthracite coal. Low-sulfur coal was once mined at three locations within the Pine Creek watershed. Below this is the late Mississippian Mauch Chunk Formation, which is formed with grayish-red shale, siltstone, sandstone, and conglomerate.

Next below these is the Mississippian Burgoon Sandstone, which is buff-colored with shale, coal, and conglomerate inclusions. Below this is the late Devonian and early Mississippian Huntley Mountain Formation, which is made of relatively soft grayish-red shale and olive-gray sandstone. The lowest and oldest layer is the red shale and siltstone of the Catskill Formation, some 375 million years old. This layer is relatively soft and easily eroded, which helped to form the Pine Creek Gorge. The source of Little Pine Creek is on Mauch Chunk rock, and the stream cuts deeper as it flows south to Pine Creek. In the park Upper Pine Bottom Run has cut through layers of Burgoon sandstone and Huntley Mountain rock, and downstream of the park to its mouth the deepest parts of the valleys are made of the Catskill Formation.

The Allegheny Plateau has a continental climate, with occasional severe low temperatures in winter and average daily temperature ranges (difference between the daily high and low) of 20 °F (11 °C) in winter and 26 °F (14 °C) in summer. The mean annual precipitation for the Pine Creek watershed is 36 to 42 inches (914 to 1,070 mm). January is the coldest month at Little Pine State Park, July the warmest, and June the wettest. The highest recorded temperature at the park was 104 °F (40 °C) in 1988, and the record low was −19 °F (−28 °C) in 1982.

Climate data for Little Pine State Park
| Month | Jan | Feb | Mar | Apr | May | Jun | Jul | Aug | Sep | Oct | Nov | Dec | Year |
|---|---|---|---|---|---|---|---|---|---|---|---|---|---|
| Mean daily maximum °F (°C) | 34 (1) | 38 (3) | 49 (9) | 61 (16) | 72 (22) | 80 (27) | 84 (29) | 82 (28) | 75 (24) | 64 (18) | 51 (11) | 39 (4) | 61 (16) |
| Mean daily minimum °F (°C) | 16 (−9) | 17 (−8) | 25 (−4) | 35 (2) | 45 (7) | 54 (12) | 60 (16) | 58 (14) | 51 (11) | 38 (3) | 30 (−1) | 22 (−6) | 38 (3) |
| Average precipitation inches (mm) | 2.52 (64) | 2.29 (58) | 3.13 (80) | 3.29 (84) | 3.67 (93) | 4.80 (122) | 4.23 (107) | 4.01 (102) | 3.87 (98) | 3.07 (78) | 3.48 (88) | 2.72 (69) | 41.08 (1,043) |
Source: The Weather Channel

== Facilities and recreation ==
Camping season at Little Pine State Park runs from the first weekend in April to mid-December. The park has 104 modern camping sites, 20 for tents only (non-electric), the rest can accommodate travel trailers up to 30 feet (9.1 m) in length. All these sites have electricity. There are also three cottages (each can sleep five people), two yurtss (each sleep 6) and four group tenting sites (two able to accommodate 40 people and two for 20 people).

Hiking and cross country skiing can be enjoyed on several trails in the park and surrounding Tiadaghton State Forest, including the 5 miles (8.0 km) Lakeshore trail around the lake, where cross country skiing is available in winter. Part of the Pennsylvania Mid State Trail, which is 261 miles (420 km) long, runs through the park just south of the dam.

Hunting is possible in season on approximately 1,700 acres (690 ha) of the park, plus the adjacent Tiadaghton State Forest lands. Rifle, pistol, archery, and trapping are all possible, with firearm and archery ranges in the park. A rehabilitation project for the Little Pine Shooting range is in progress and will be completed in late spring/early summer 2014. The improvements to the range include a pavilion, restroom, benches and an enlarged parking area. Typical game animals include bear, white-tailed deer, fox, ruffed grouse, eastern gray squirrel, and wild turkey. The hunting of groundhogs is prohibited.

Picnicking facilities include four picnic areas, each with a pavilion that may be reserved, and many picnic tables and grills. A volleyball court is available. The lower picnic area is separate from the rest of the park (about 0.5 miles (800 m) below the dam and campground).

Sledding and tobogganing in the park are allowed on the shores of the lake in winter. The lake ice must be at least 4 inches (10 cm) thick.

=== Little Pine Lake ===
Boating on the lake is allowed with electric motors only. There is one boat launch area for the lake, 25 mooring places (available April 1 to November 1), and rental paddleboats, canoes and rowboats available (from Memorial Day to Labor Day).

Fishing in the park includes fly fishing on 4.2 miles (6.8 km) of Little Pine Creek, bank fishing on 3.3 miles (5.3 km) of lake shoreline, and boat fishing on the lake's 94 acres (38 ha). Fish species include: smallmouth bass, catfish, pickerel, perch, sunfish, and native and stocked trout (brook, brown, and rainbow). Ice fishing on the lake is possible in winter. The laws and regulations of the Pennsylvania Fish and Boat Commission apply.

Swimming is open from late May to mid-September, from 8 am to sunset each day. The beach is sand, with a lawn beside it. No lifeguard is on duty.

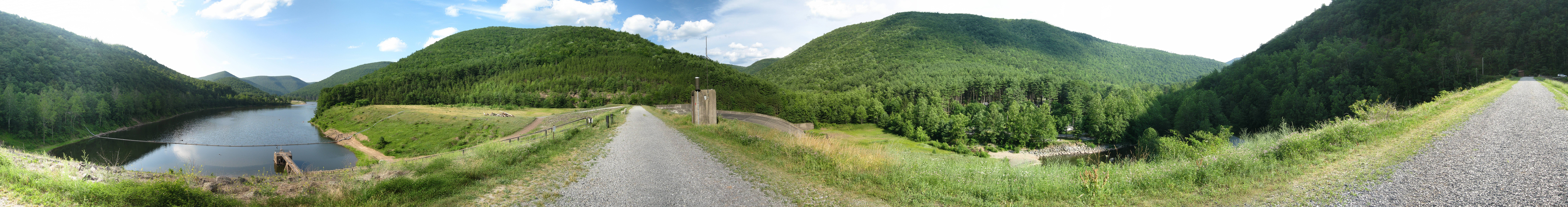
Panoramic view of the park from on top of the dam; Little Pine Lake is at left, the road on top of the dam is at center and again at extreme right, and the campground and Little Pine Creek below the dam are at right.
