= Algerine Swamp Natural Area =

Natural area in Pennsylvania

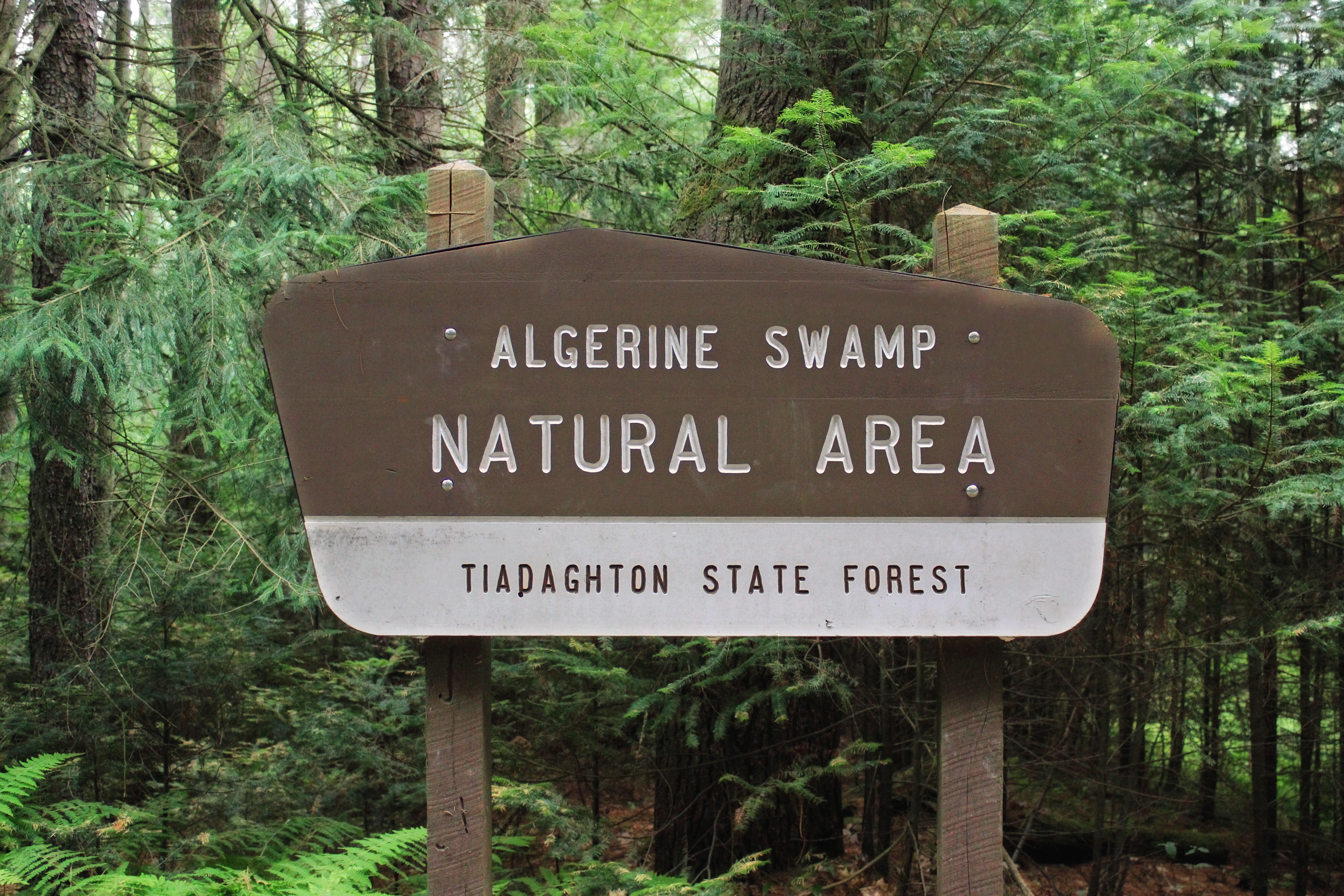

- Location within Pennsylvania
- Location: Lycoming County and Tioga County, Pennsylvania
- Nearest town: Cedar Run
- Coordinates: 41°33′08″N 77°29′44″W
- Area: 84 acres (34 ha)

Algerine Swamp Natural Area is an 84-acre (34 ha) protected area in Lycoming and Tioga Counties, Pennsylvania, United States. It is part of Tiadaghton State Forest, and has also been named a National Natural Landmark.

The Natural Area features black spruce and balsam fir trees, both of which are rare in Pennsylvania, and is centered on a glacial bog. The area includes other tree species that are more common to the north in Canada, as well as a population of pitcher plants. The area can be reached via the nearby Long Branch Trail, a short distance north of a junction with the long-distance Black Forest Trail.
