= Tiadaghton State Forest =

State forest in Pennsylvania, United States

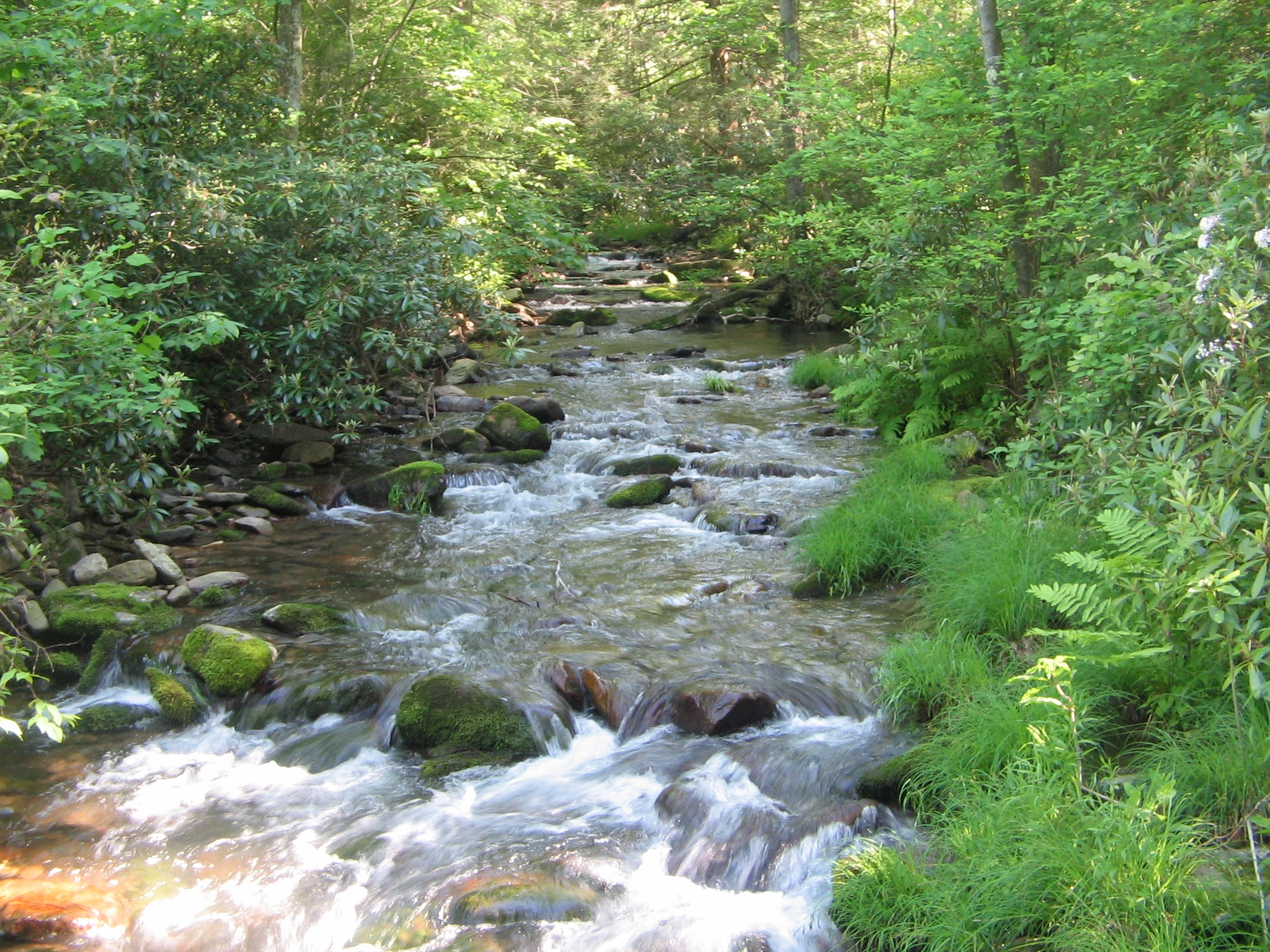
- Tiadaghton State Forest: White Deer Hole Creek near the Fourth Gap of South White Deer Ridge, Washington Township, Lycoming County, Pennsylvania

- Location within Pennsylvania
- Location: Pennsylvania, United States
- Coordinates: 41°18′53″N 77°23′04″W
- Area: 146,926 acres (594.59 km^{2})
- Elevation: 1,493 ft (455 m)
- Named for: Tiadaghton, an Iroquois name for Pine Creek
- Governing body: Pennsylvania Department of Conservation and Natural Resources
- Administrator: Pennsylvania Department of Conservation and Natural Resources

Tiadaghton State Forest (/ˌtaɪəˈdɑːtən/; ty-ə-DAH-tən) is a Pennsylvania State Forest (Forest District #12) in the Pennsylvania Department of Conservation and Natural Resources, Bureau of Forestry. The forest is primarily in western and southern Lycoming County, with small portions in Clinton, Potter, Tioga, and Union Counties. The district's topography consists of narrow, flat to sloping plateaus cut by deep, steep-sloped valleys carved by fast moving mountain streams, including Pine Creek, Slate Run, and their tributaries. The Tiadaghton district extends south across the lowland along the west branch of the Susquehanna River to the narrow crests of Bald Eagle Mountain and North and South White Deer Ridge. The majority of forest cover is dominated by mixed oak forests, with some areas of northern hardwoods. The Tiadaghton State Forest is one of eight forest districts in the Pennsylvania Wilds region.

The forest district office, the Tiadaghton Resource Management Center, is located just north of the town of Waterville, in Lycoming County, Pennsylvania in the United States. Tiadaghton is the Iroquois name for Pine Creek, but its meaning is unknown.

== History ==
As the timber was exhausted and the land burned, many companies simply abandoned their holdings. Conservationists like Dr. Joseph Rothrock became concerned that the forests would not regrow if they were not managed properly. They called for the state to purchase land from the lumber companies and for a change in the philosophy of forest management. In 1895 Rothrock was appointed the first commissioner of the Pennsylvania Department of Forests and Waters, the forerunner of today's Department of Conservation and Natural Resources. In 1897 the Pennsylvania General Assembly passed legislation which authorized the purchase of "unseated lands for forest reservations" and the first Pennsylvania state forest lands were acquired the following year.

On July 13, 1898, the state bought a 409-acre (166 ha) tract of land in Cummings Township for $72.99 ($2825 in 2025 terms). This was the first purchase for what became Tiadaghton State Forest, which surrounds the park. The state forest grew to 66,000 acres (27,000 ha) by 1908, and over 160,000 acres (65,000 ha) in 1933. Most of the major purchases for it were made between 1900 and 1935.

=== 2005 Realignment ===
Prior to the July 1, 2005 realignment of Pennsylvania State Forest Districts, Tiadaghton State Forest included all state forest lands in Lycoming County and encompassed 215,500 acres (87,210 ha). After realignment, the state forest tracts in eastern Lycoming County became part of the new Loyalsock State Forest. The District #12 office will also move from South Williamsport to Waterville, at the confluence of Little Pine Creek and Pine Creek, where the largest part of the forest is now located. The southern tracts are along Bald Eagle Mountain, North White Deer Ridge, South White Deer Ridge, and the White Deer Hole Creek watershed.

As of 2009, the Tiadaghton State Forest covered 146,500 acres (59,300 ha), chiefly in Lycoming County with small tracts in Clinton, Potter, Tioga, and Union Counties. The largest section of the state forest consists of 105,000 acres (42,000 ha) in the Pine Creek valley.

== Other attractions ==
=== Hiking ===
- Black Forest Trail; loop trail, 42.1 miles (67.8 km) long, west of Pine Creek in northwest Lycoming County
- Golden Eagle Trail; loop trail, 9.2 miles (14.8 km) long, east of Pine Creek in northwest Lycoming County
- Mid State Trail; 327 miles (526 km) south-north across Pennsylvania from the Maryland border to the New York border
- Pine Creek Trail; 62 miles (100 km) rail trail from Jersey Shore, Pennsylvania north along Pine Creek to Wellsboro Junction in Tioga county and Tioga State Forest

=== Natural areas ===
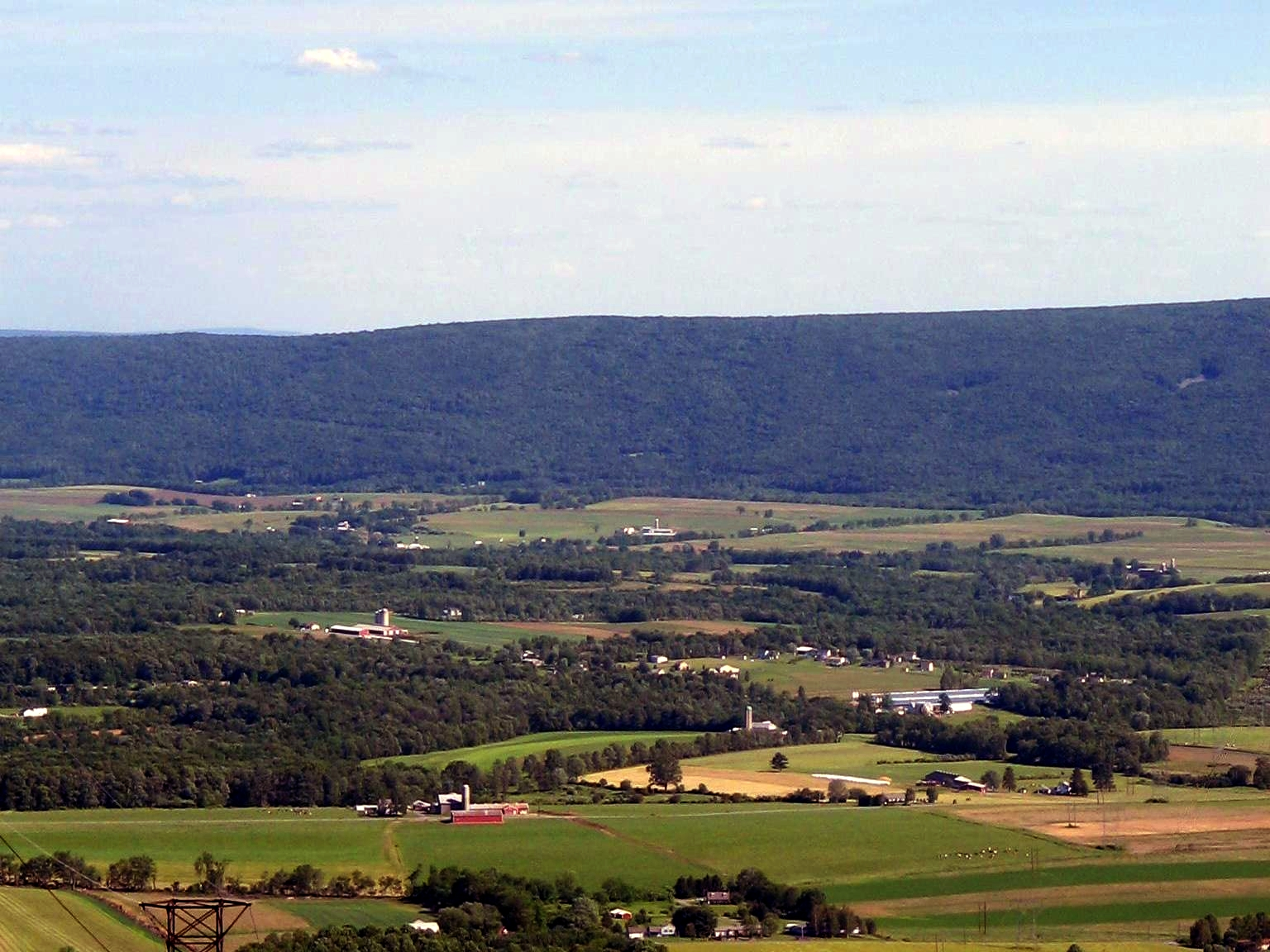
The southern tract of Tiadaghton State Forest runs along White South Deer Ridge

- Algerine Swamp Natural Area; 84 acres (34 ha)
- Bark Cabin Natural Area; a 73-acre (30 ha) stand of old growth Eastern Hemlock, Northern Red Oak, White Ash, Bigtooth Aspen, and Hickories, and the Mid State Trail
- Miller Run Natural Area; 4,000 acres (1,619 ha) oak and hardwood forest, three streams
- Red Pine Natural Area; 10 acres (4.0 ha) with a stand of old growth red pine.
- Torbert Island Natural Area; 54 acres (22 ha), an island in Pine Creek.

=== Wild areas ===
- Algerine Wild Area; 3,700 acres (1,497 ha) with the Black Forest Trail
- Wolf Run Wild Area; 6,900 acres (2,792 ha) with the Golden Eagle Trail

== Nearby state parks ==
- Little Pine State Park (Lycoming County)
- Ravensburg State Park (Clinton County)
- Susquehanna State Park (Lycoming County)
- Upper Pine Bottom State Park (Lycoming County)

== Neighboring state forest districts ==
- Tioga State Forest (north)
- Loyalsock State Forest (east)
- Weiser State Forest (southwest)
- Bald Eagle State Forest (south)
- Sproul State Forest (west)
- Susquehannock State Forest (northwest)
