= Miller Run Natural Area =

Natural area in Pennsylvania

- Location within Pennsylvania
- Location: Lycoming County, Pennsylvania
- Nearest town: Haneyville
- Coordinates: 41°22′15″N 77°29′21″W
- Area: 4,992 acres (2,020 ha)

Miller Run Natural Area is a 4,992-acre (2,020 ha) protected area in Lycoming County, Pennsylvania, United States. It is part of Tiadaghton State Forest, and is the second-largest designated Natural Area in Pennsylvania.

== Details ==
The Natural Area protects the watersheds of four different streams that are all tributaries of Pine Creek. The longest, Miller Run, has been designated as a High-Quality Stream by the Pennsylvania Department of Environmental Protection.

Plants that are uncommon in the region can be found in the Natural Area, such as the poisonous white baneberry, and the area includes the ruins of several logging railroads and their affiliated camps. The Natural Area can only be accessed via relatively dilapidated hiking trails from a nearby gravel road.
