= Upper Pine Bottom State Park =

State park in Lycoming County, Pennsylvania, United States

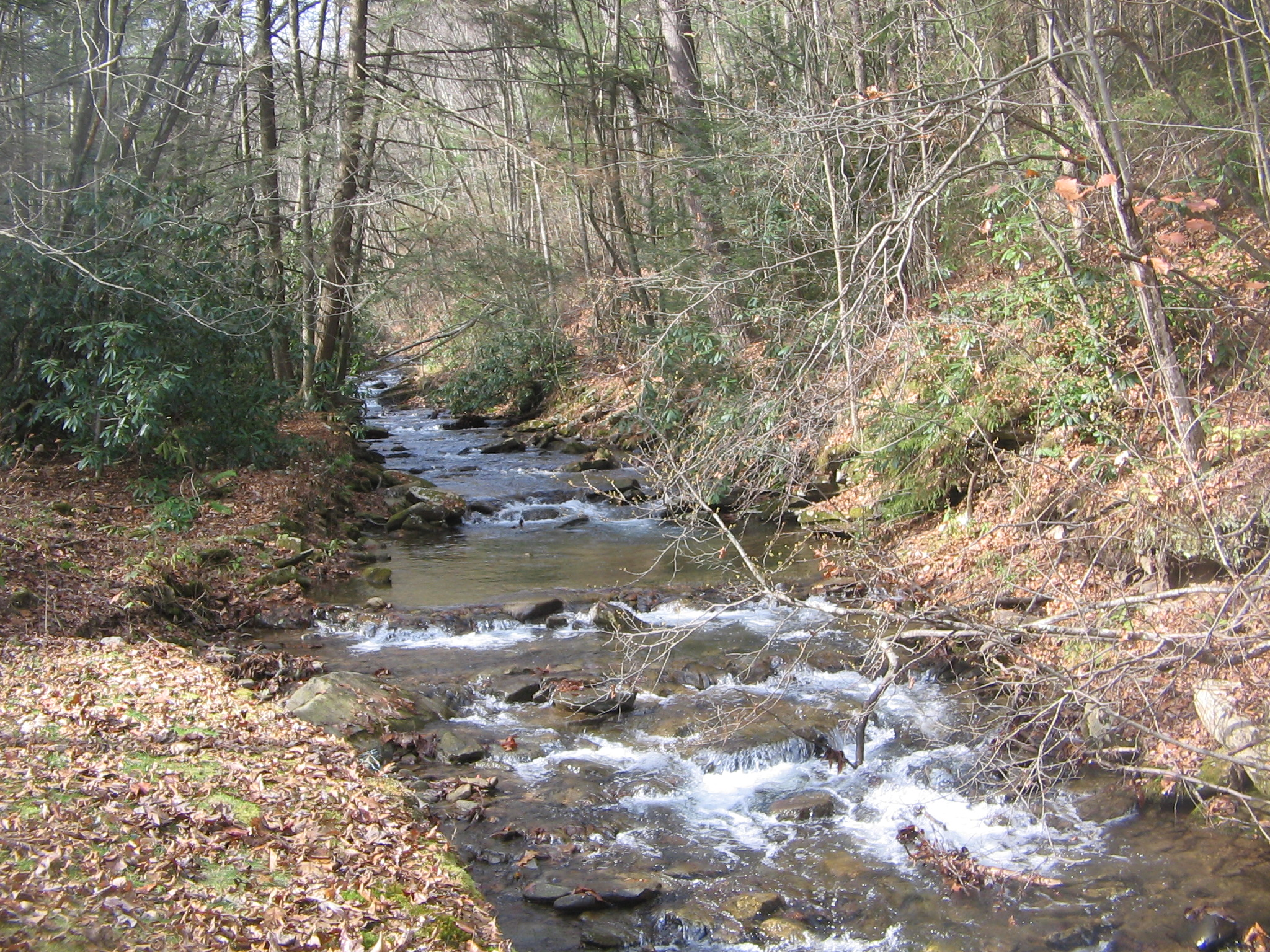

- Location within Pennsylvania Location within the United States
- Interactive map of Upper Pine Bottom State Park
- Location: Cummings Township, Lycoming County, Pennsylvania, United States
- Coordinates: 41°19′08″N 77°25′15″W
- Area: 5 acres (2.0 ha)
- Elevation: 932 feet (284 m)
- Established: 1923
- Administrator: Pennsylvania Department of Conservation and Natural Resources
- Named for: Upper Pine Bottom Run
- Website: Official website
- Pennsylvania State Parks

Upper Pine Bottom State Park is a 5-acre (2 ha) Pennsylvania state park in Lycoming County, Pennsylvania, United States. The park is in Cummings Township on Pennsylvania Route 44 and is surrounded by the Tiadaghton State Forest. It is on Upper Pine Bottom Run, which gave the park its name and is a tributary of Pine Creek. Upper Pine Bottom State Park is in the Pine Creek Gorge, where the streams have cut through five major rock formations from the Devonian and Carboniferous periods.

The earliest recorded inhabitants of the area were the Susquehannocks, followed by the Iroquois, Lenape, and Shawnee. Upper Pine Bottom Run was the site of a furnace for pig iron in 1814, the first sawmill was built on it in 1815, and in 1825 an earlier bridle path across its headwaters became a turnpike. The lumber industry led to the clearcutting of the area in the 19th century. The state forest was started in 1898 and the park was formed from it by 1923 as a Class B public camp. The Civilian Conservation Corps had a camp on the run and improved the park in the 1930s, but it was not transferred to the Bureau of State Parks until 1962. Though it began as a public campsite and once had a picnic pavilion, as of 2017 it is for day use only and its only facilities are a few picnic tables and a parking area.

Upper Pine Bottom State Park is one of the smallest state parks in Pennsylvania, and is maintained by staff from nearby Little Pine State Park. In addition to picnics, its chief use is as a parking area for local hunters, anglers, hikers, cross-country skiers, snowmobilers, and all-terrain vehicle riders. Upper Pine Bottom Run is state-approved and stocked for trout fishing in season. Second-growth forest now covers the region; the surrounding state forest and park are home to a variety of flora and fauna.

== History ==
=== Native Americans ===
Humans have lived in what is now Pennsylvania since at least 10,000 BC. The first settlers were Paleo-Indian nomadic hunters known from their stone tools. The hunter-gatherers of the Archaic period, which lasted locally from 7000 to 1000 BC, used a greater variety of more sophisticated stone artifacts. The Woodland period marked the gradual transition to semi-permanent villages and horticulture, between 1000 BC and 1500 AD. Archeological evidence found in the state from this time includes a range of pottery types and styles, burial mounds, pipes, bows and arrows, and ornaments.

Upper Pine Bottom State Park is in the West Branch Susquehanna River drainage basin, the earliest recorded inhabitants of which were the Iroquoian-speaking Susquehannocks. They were a matriarchal society that lived in stockaded villages of large long houses. Upper Pine Bottom Run is at the southern end of the Pine Creek Gorge, and the mountains surrounding the gorge were "occasionally inhabited" by the Susquehannocks. Their numbers were greatly reduced by disease and warfare with the Five Nations of the Iroquois, and by 1675 they had died out, moved away, or been assimilated into other tribes.

After this, the lands of the West Branch Susquehanna River valley were under the nominal control of the Iroquois. They lived in long houses, primarily in what is now New York, and had a strong confederacy which gave them power beyond their numbers. The Iroquois and other tribes used the Pine Creek Path through the gorge, traveling between a path on the Genesee River in modern New York in the north, and the Great Shamokin Path along the West Branch Susquehanna River in the south. The Seneca tribe of the Iroquois believed that the Pine Creek Gorge was sacred land and never established a permanent settlement there, though they did use the path through the gorge and had seasonal hunting camps along it.

To fill the void left by the demise of the Susquehannocks, the Iroquois encouraged displaced tribes from the east to settle in the West Branch watershed, including the Shawnee and Lenape (or Delaware). The valleys of Pine Creek and its tributaries in Cummings Township were used by the Iroquois and Algonkian tribes as a hunting ground. Historians believe that there may have been a Shawnee village and burial ground just to the north of Little Pine State Park on Little Pine Creek, just a few miles from what became Upper Pine Bottom State Park.

The French and Indian War (1754–1763) led to the migration of many Native Americans westward to the Ohio River basin. In October 1784, the United States acquired a large tract of land, including what is now Upper Pine Bottom State Park, from the Iroquois in the Second Treaty of Fort Stanwix (this acquisition is known in Pennsylvania as the Last Purchase). In the years that followed, Native Americans almost entirely left Pennsylvania; however some isolated bands of natives remained in the Pine Creek Gorge until the War of 1812.

=== Lumber and turnpike ===
The land that became Cummings Township was first settled by European Americans in 1784. Lycoming County was formed from a part of Northumberland County on April 13, 1795. Upper Pine Bottom Run was originally "famed for the wonderful white pine forest that clothed all the bottomlands", and the region was covered with eastern white pine and eastern hemlock trees, which lumbermen harvested. To accommodate larger-scale lumber operations and the large quantities of pine logs which these floated downstream to the West Branch Susquehanna River, the Pennsylvania General Assembly declared Pine Creek a public highway on March 16, 1798.

A log raft on Pine Creek

The area surrounding Upper Pine Bottom State Park has been a wilderness for much of its history. In 1806–1807 a bridle path was cut through the woods just west of the source of Upper Pine Bottom Run as part of a 72-mile (116 km) path between Jersey Shore (to the south, at the mouth of Pine Creek) and Coudersport (to the northwest, on the Allegheny River in Potter County). The bridle path was widened to a road to accommodate wagons in 1812.

The new road soon brought industry to the region. The discovery of iron ore along the road led seven men to form a company to manufacture iron. In 1814 they built a furnace to produce pig iron on Upper Pine Bottom Run. It took one to two days to haul the ore to the furnace, and other supplies had to be transported 15 miles (24 km) to the furnace on steep mountain roads. These costs were too high, and the furnace lost almost $7,000 (approximately $141,000 in 2025) before closing in 1817. The ruins of the iron furnace were visible through much of the 19th century.

The first two sawmills were built on Upper Pine Bottom Run in 1815 and 1817. In 1817, Michael and Henry Wolf also arrived in the area from Berks County and built a sawmill near the mouth of Little Pine Creek, which is 1.8 miles (2.9 km) downstream Pine Creek from the mouth of Upper Pine Bottom Run. The Wolfs' sawmill and the land they cleared for farming helped establish the unincorporated village of Waterville, which became the most significant population center in Cummings Township, and is about 2.5 miles (4.0 km) southeast of Upper Pine Bottom State Park.

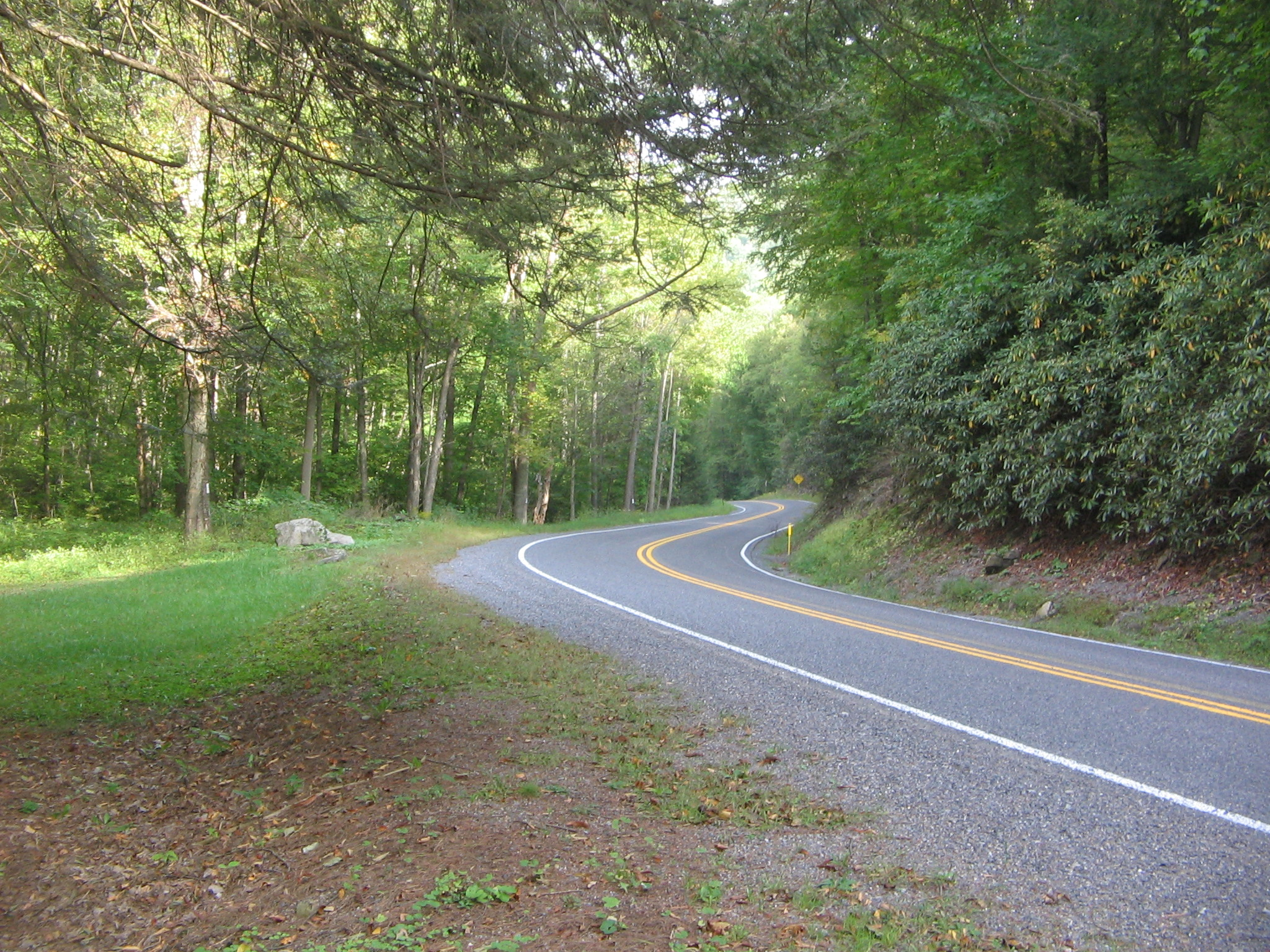
Pennsylvania Route 44 passes through the park, and was the scene of a wildfire in 1894.

The Jersey Shore and Coudersport Turnpike was built along the former bridle path between 1825 and 1834. The turnpike, which operated until 1860, had toll booths every 5 miles (8 km) and charged a horse-drawn wagon $1.68 to travel the entire road. A post office was established in nearby Waterville in 1849; early businesses there included two stores and a hotel, which still stands. Pennsylvania Route 44, which passes through the park, still follows the course of the former path and turnpike between Haneyville (at the western end of Upper Pine Bottom Run) and Coudersport (to the north).^{[a]}

Economic development and increased settlement led the Pennsylvania General Assembly to establish Cummings Township in 1832 from land taken from parts of Mifflin and Brown Townships. The new township was named for John Cummings, who was an associate judge in the local court system at the time. Early industry in the township included lumber and quarries for flag and building stone. In 1839 Clinton County was formed from the western part of Lycoming County, with much of the eastern border of the new county formed by the turnpike.

In 1851 the Susquehanna Boom opened on the West Branch Susquehanna River at Williamsport. The log boom, a series of artificial islands with chains between them to catch logs, led to an expansion of the lumber industry and to Williamsport's nickname, "Lumber Capital of the World". In 1852, the 3 miles (4.8 km) of Upper Pine Bottom Run upstream of the mouth were made a public highway by the state legislature, and by 1888 the West Branch Lumber Company owned the headwaters of Upper Pine Bottom Run.

The lumber era did not last; the old-growth forests were clearcut by the early 20th century and the Pine Creek Gorge was stripped bare. Nothing was left except the discarded, dried-out tree tops, which became a fire hazard, so much of the land burned and was left barren. In the spring of 1894 a fire burned in what is now Tiadaghton State Forest along Route 44 to near Haneyville. In the summer of 1908 the area around the park burned again, in a fire that stretched from Galeton to Jersey Shore. The soil was depleted of nutrients, fires baked the ground hard, and jungles of blueberries, blackberries, and mountain laurel covered the clearcut land, which became known as the "Pennsylvania Desert". Disastrous floods swept the area periodically and much of the wildlife was wiped out.

=== State forest and park ===
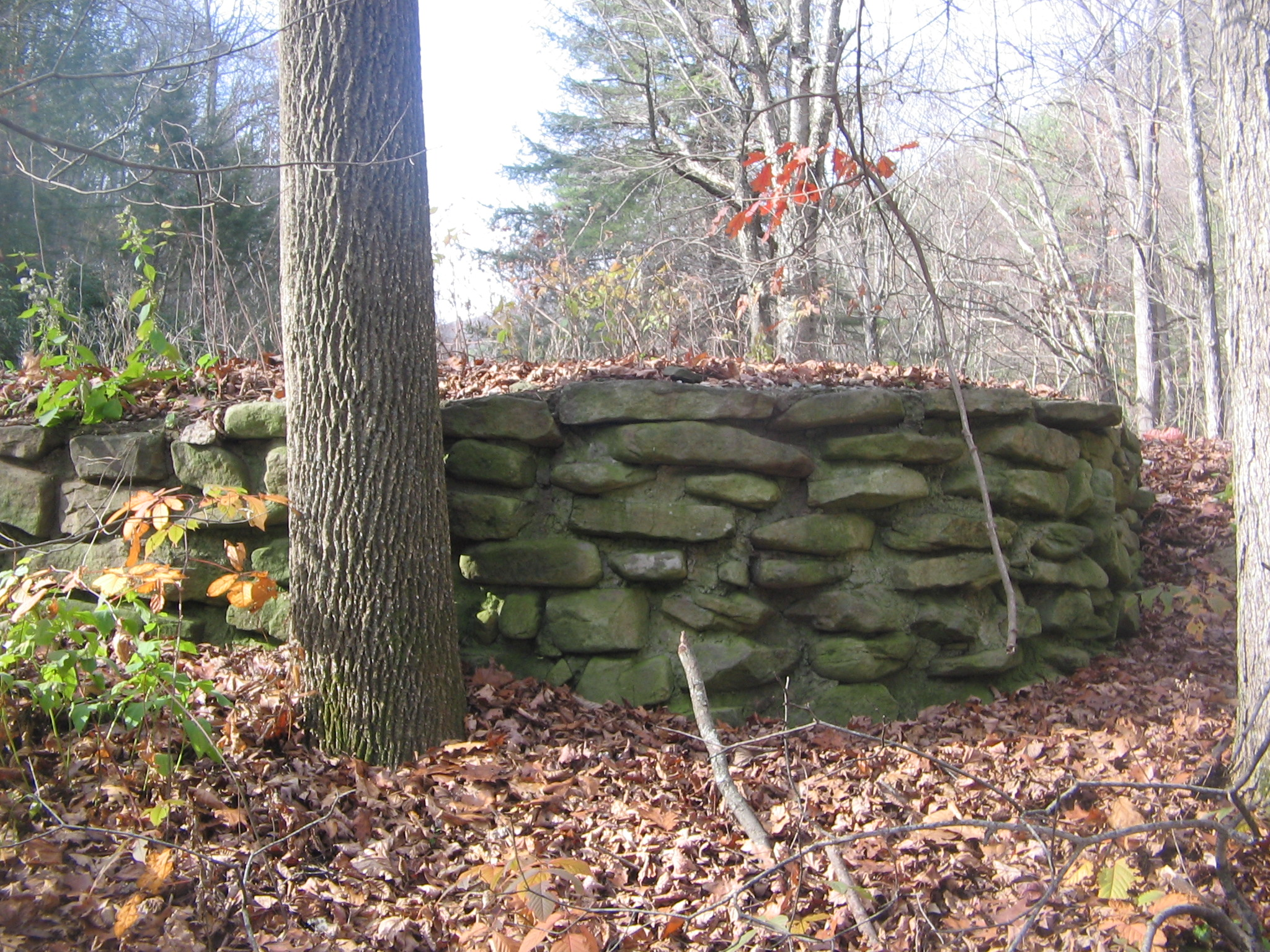
The only remnant of the former picnic pavilion is this stone foundation.

As the timber was exhausted and the land burned, many companies simply abandoned their holdings. Conservationists like Joseph Rothrock became concerned that the forests would not regrow if they were not managed properly. They called for the state to purchase land from the lumber companies and for a change in the philosophy of forest management. In 1895 Rothrock was appointed the first commissioner of the Pennsylvania Department of Forests and Waters, the forerunner of today's Department of Conservation and Natural Resources. In 1897 the Pennsylvania General Assembly passed legislation which authorized the purchase of "unseated lands for forest reservations" and the first Pennsylvania state forest lands were acquired the following year.

On July 13, 1898, the state bought a 409-acre (166 ha) tract of land in Cummings Township for $72.99 ($2825 in 2025 terms). This was the first purchase for what became Tiadaghton State Forest, which surrounds Upper Pine Bottom State Park. Most of the major purchases for it were made between 1900 and 1935. As of 2017, the Tiadaghton State Forest covered 146,539 acres (59,302 ha), chiefly in Lycoming County with small tracts in Clinton, Potter, Tioga, and Union Counties. The largest section of the state forest covers 105,000 acres (42,000 ha) in the Pine Creek valley (and encircles the park).

Upper Pine Bottom State Park traces its existence to the early 1920s, when the Pennsylvania Department of Forestry built 31 campsites on state forest land between 1921 and 1925. The park was established by 1923 as "Upper Pine Bottom Class B Public Camp", and named for the stream that flows through it. Class B camps were on secondary highways and were "used primarily by hikers, hunters, fishermen, vacationists, and picknickers who desire to go far into the woods and make their stay comfortable". Each Class B camp had a lean-to shelter for camping, potable water, picnic tables, a fireplace, garbage can, and a latrine. There was no charge to use any of the camps, but stays were limited to two consecutive nights.

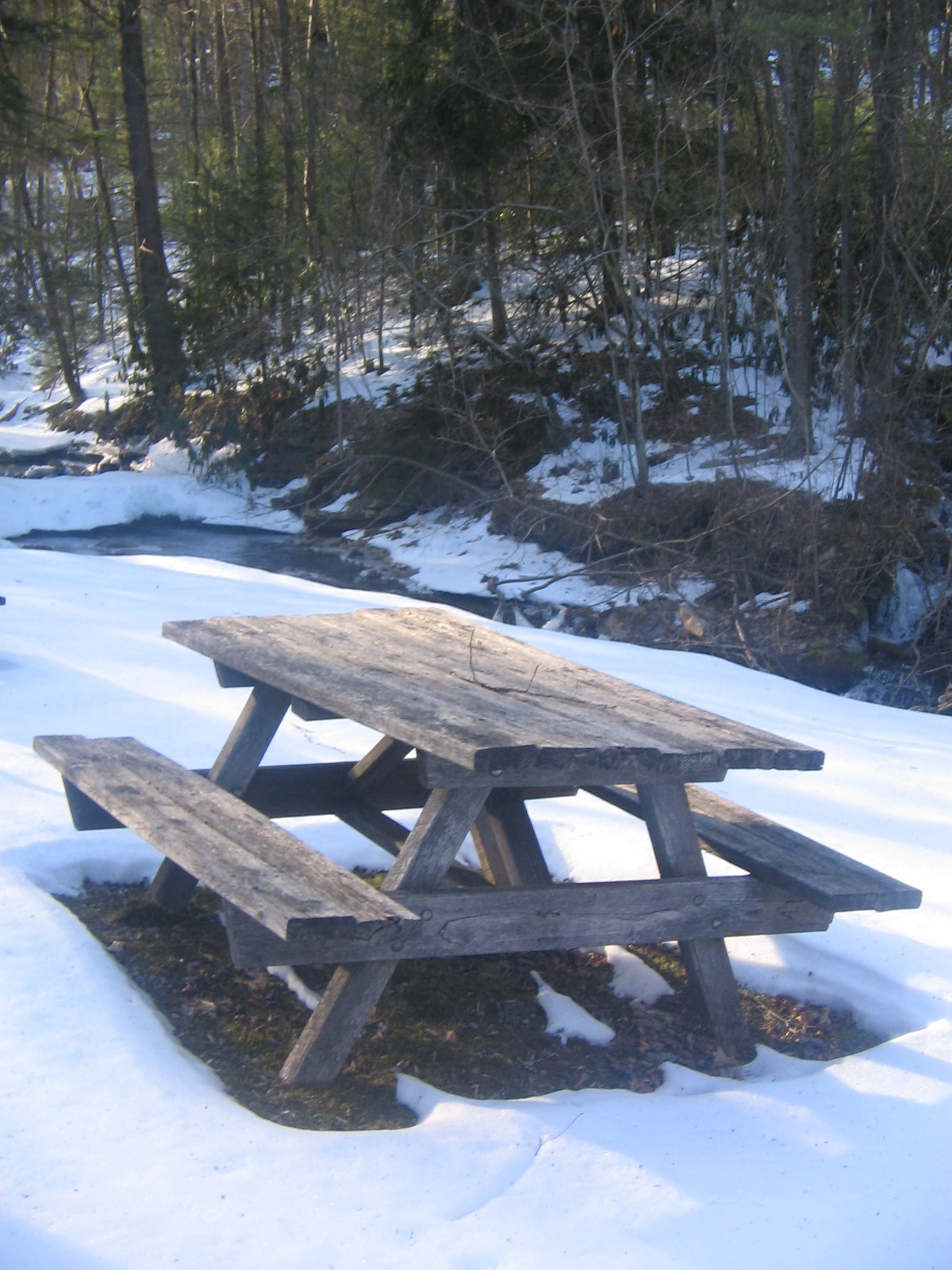
Picnic table and Upper Pine Bottom Run at Upper Pine Bottom State Park

During the Great Depression, the Civilian Conservation Corps (CCC) set up nine camps in Tiadaghton State Forest. The camps included two near Upper Pine Bottom State Park: CCC Camp S-82-Pa (Waterville, also known as Haneyville) was on Upper Pine Bottom Run about 2.5 miles (4.0 km) west of the park and operated from May 1933 to 1941; CCC Camp S-129-Pa (Little Pine) was at the site of nearby Little Pine State Park and operated from 1933 to 1937. The CCC planted large numbers of trees in the state forest, did work in the park, and built a pavilion at the site in 1936. Although the roof of a structure was still visible in the park in a 1959 aerial photo,^{[b]} by 2017 there were no pavilions or other buildings in the park. The United States' entry into the Second World War in 1941 led to the end of the CCC, and all its camps were closed by the summer of 1942.

In 1950 the park was known as "Upper Pine Bottom State Forest Picnic Area" and was mentioned in a New York Times article on the Pine Creek Gorge. On November 11, 1954, the Pennsylvania Geographic Board made the picnic area name official. The Pennsylvania Bureau of Forestry's Division of State Parks became the Bureau of State Parks in 1962 and Upper Pine Bottom (and all state parks and picnic areas) were transferred to it from Forestry that year. In 1972, Upper Pine Bottom was one of 10 state forest picnic areas kept by the Bureau of State Parks (35 were transferred to the Bureau of Forestry), and Forrey's 1984 History of Pennsylvania's State Parks referred to it as a state forest picnic area. The Pennsylvania Department of Transportation (Penn DOT) 1993 map still called it a picnic area, but Cupper's 1993 Our Priceless Heritage: Pennsylvania's State Parks 1893–1993 called it a state park, as did the Penn DOT 2002 map.

As of 2017 Upper Pine Bottom State Park is a roadside park for day use only, with a small parking lot and a few picnic tables. In addition to picnics, its chief use is as a parking area for local hunters, anglers, hikers, cross country skiers, and snowmobilers. Staff from nearby Little Pine State Park maintain Upper Pine Bottom, and it is one of the smallest state parks in Pennsylvania. Prouty Place State Park, a picnic area to the northwest in Potter County, is also 5 acres (2.0 ha). Only Sand Bridge State Park, another picnic area to the south in Union County, is smaller, at 3 acres (1.2 ha).

== Geology and climate ==
Although the rock formations exposed in Upper Pine Bottom State Park and the Pine Creek Gorge are at least 300 million years old, the gorge itself formed about 20,000 years ago, in the last ice age. Pine Creek had flowed northeasterly until then, but was dammed by rocks, soil, ice, and other debris deposited by the receding Laurentide Continental Glacier. The dammed creek formed a lake near what would later be the village of Ansonia in Shippen Township in Tioga County, and the lake's glacial meltwater overflowed the debris dam, reversing the flow of Pine Creek. The creek flooded to the south and quickly carved a deep channel on its way to the West Branch Susquehanna River.

The land on which Upper Pine Bottom State Park sits was part of the coastline of a shallow sea that covered a great portion of what is now North America about 300 million years ago, in the Pennsylvanian subperiod. The high mountains to the east of the sea gradually eroded, causing a buildup of sediment made up primarily of clay, sand and gravel. Tremendous pressure on the sediment caused the formation of the rocks that are found today in the Pine Creek drainage basin: sandstone, shale, conglomerates, limestone, and coal.

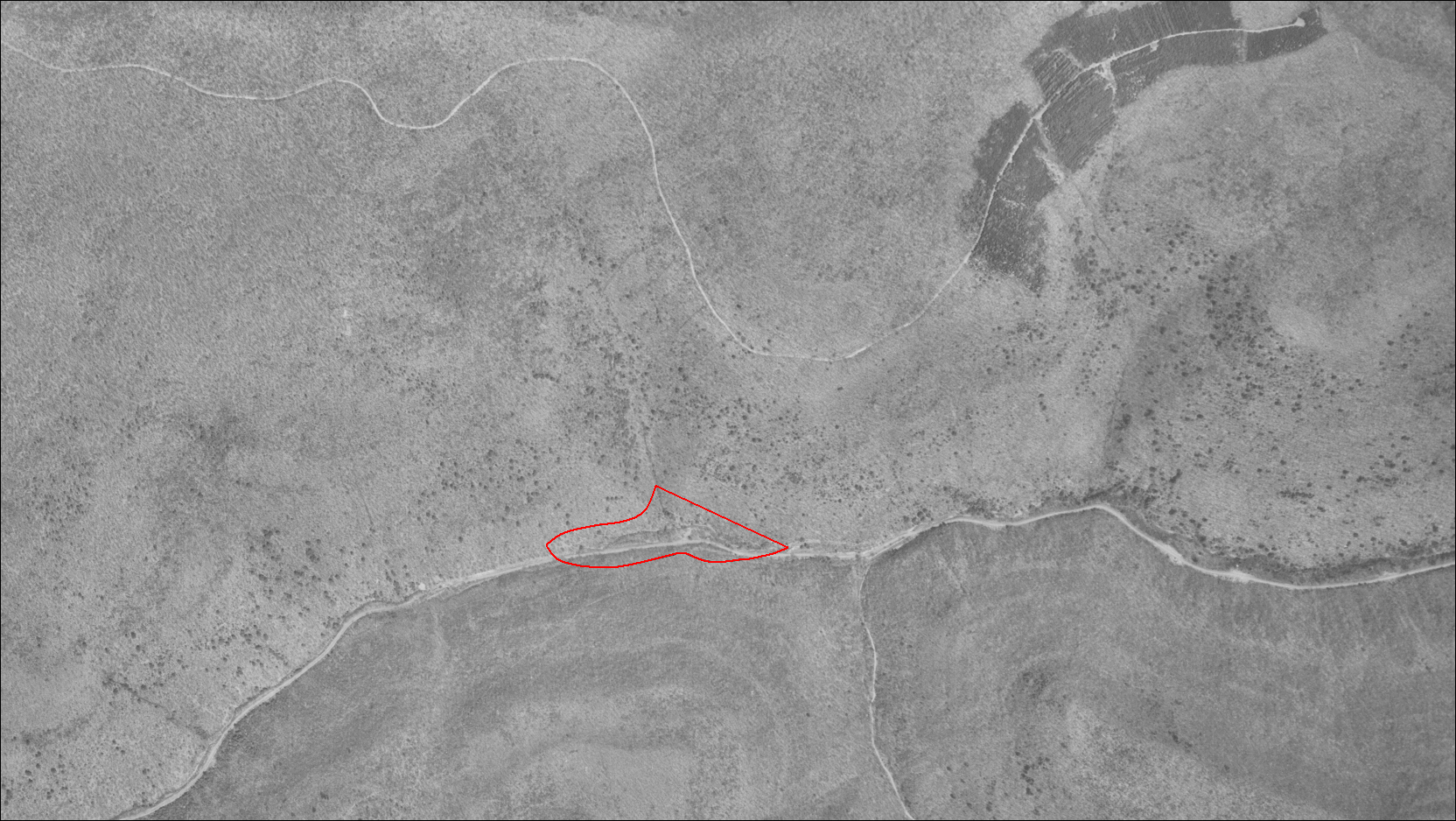
Erosion of the dissected Allegheny Plateau by Upper Pine Bottom Run is visible in this 1959 aerial view. PA 44 follows the run, and the outline of the park is red.

The park is at an elevation of 932 feet (284 m) on the Allegheny Plateau, which formed in the Alleghenian orogeny some 300 million years ago, when the part of Gondwana that became Africa collided with what became North America, forming Pangaea. Although the gorge and its surroundings seem to be mountainous, the area is a dissected plateau. Years of erosion have cut away the soft rocks, forming the valleys, and left the hardest of the ancient rocks relatively untouched on the top of sharp ridges, giving them the appearance of "mountains".

Five major rock formations from the Devonian and Carboniferous periods are present in Upper Pine Bottom State Park and Cummings Township. The youngest of these, which forms the highest points in the township, is the Pottsville Formation, a gray conglomerate dating to the early Pennsylvanian that may contain sandstone, siltstone, and shale, as well as anthracite coal. Low-sulfur coal was once mined at three locations within the Pine Creek watershed, and there is a coal deposit between the headwaters of Upper Pine Bottom and Lower Pine Bottom Runs. Below this is the Mauch Chunk Formation, from the late Mississippian, which is formed with grayish-red shale, siltstone, sandstone, and conglomerate.

Next below these is the Mississippian Burgoon Sandstone, which is buff-colored with shale, coal, and conglomerate inclusions. Below this is the late Devonian and early Mississippian Huntley Mountain Formation, which is made of relatively soft grayish-red shale and olive-gray sandstone. The lowest and oldest layer is the red shale and siltstone of the Catskill Formation, some 375 million years old. This layer is relatively soft and easily eroded, which helped to form the Pine Creek Gorge. The source of Upper Pine Bottom Run is on Mauch Chunk rock, and the stream cuts deeper as it flows east to Pine Creek. In the park Upper Pine Bottom Run has cut through layers of Burgoon sandstone and Huntley Mountain rock, and downstream of the park to its mouth the deepest parts of the valleys are made of the Catskill Formation.

The Allegheny Plateau has a continental climate, with occasional severe low temperatures in winter and average daily temperature ranges (difference between the daily high and low) of 20 °F (11 °C) in winter and 26 °F (14 °C) in summer. The mean annual precipitation for the Pine Creek watershed is 36 to 42 inches (914 to 1,070 mm). January is the coldest month at Upper Pine Bottom State Park, July the warmest, and June the wettest. The highest recorded temperature at the park was 104 °F (40 °C) in 1988, and the record low was −19 °F (−28 °C) in 1982.

Climate data for Upper Pine Bottom State Park
Month	Jan	Feb	Mar	Apr	May	Jun	Jul	Aug	Sep	Oct	Nov	Dec	Year
Mean daily maximum °F (°C)	35 (2)	39 (4)	48 (9)	62 (17)	72 (22)	80 (27)	84 (29)	83 (28)	75 (24)	63 (17)	51 (11)	39 (4)	61 (16)
Mean daily minimum °F (°C)	18 (−8)	20 (−7)	27 (−3)	36 (2)	47 (8)	56 (13)	60 (16)	59 (15)	52 (11)	40 (4)	32 (0)	24 (−4)	39 (4)
Average precipitation inches (mm)	2.47 (63)	2.31 (59)	3.11 (79)	3.27 (83)	3.69 (94)	4.47 (114)	3.95 (100)	4.20 (107)	3.96 (101)	3.34 (85)	3.41 (87)	2.74 (70)	40.92 (1,042)
Source: The Weather Channel

== Ecology ==
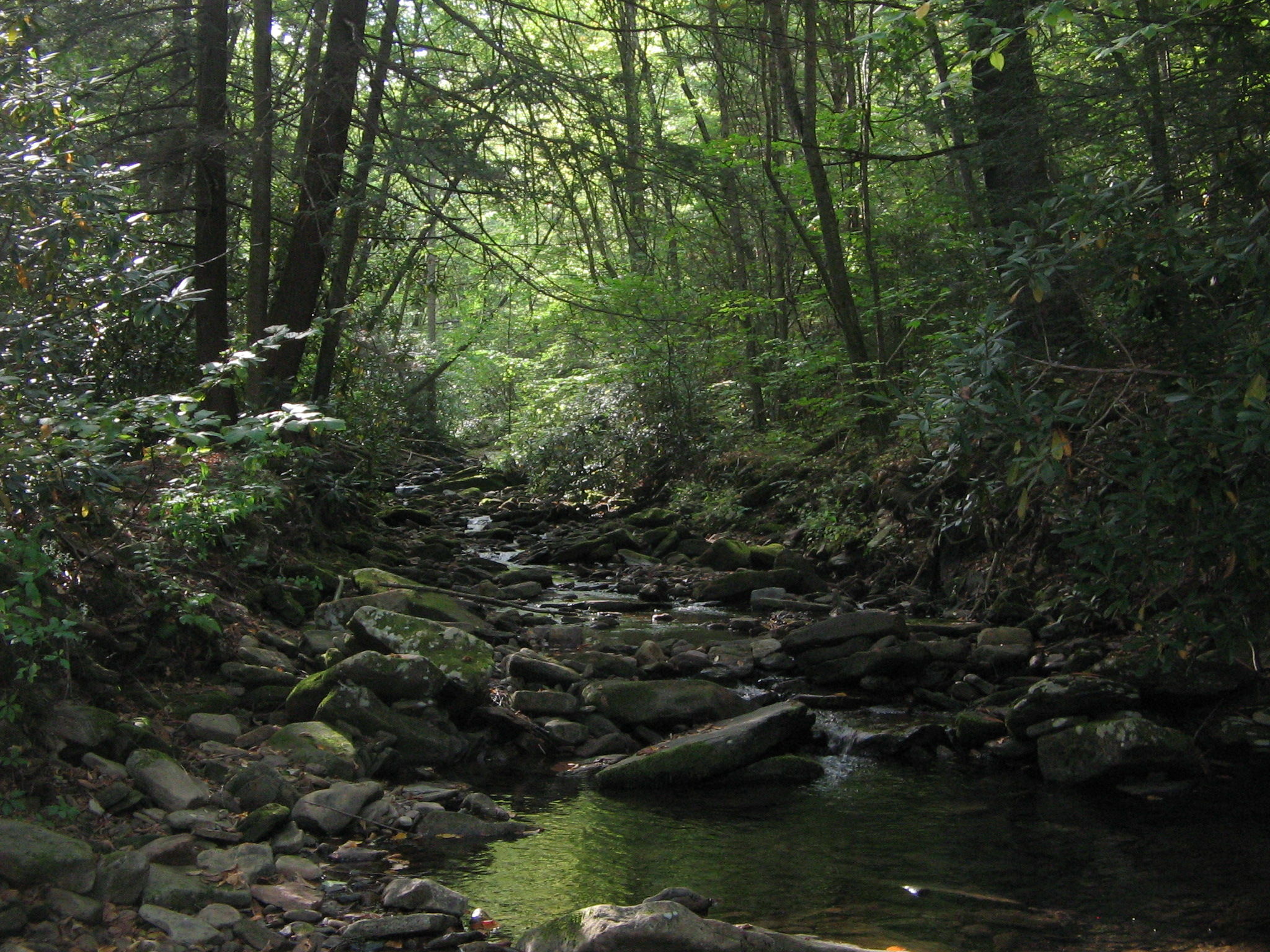
Upper Pine Bottom Run in the park in summer

Descriptions from early explorers and settlers give an idea of what the Pine Creek Gorge was like before it was clearcut. The forest was up to 85 percent hemlock and white pine; hardwoods made up the rest. The Pine Creek watershed, which Upper Pine Bottom Run is part of, was home to large predators such as wolves, lynx, wolverines, panthers, fishers, bobcats and foxes; all except the last three are locally extinct. The area had herds of American bison, elk and white-tailed deer, and large numbers of black bears, river otters, and beavers. Rattlesnakes and insects plagued early explorers and settlers in the region.

The virgin forests cooled the land and streams, and centuries of accumulated organic matter in the forest soil caused slow percolation of rainfall into the creeks and runs so that they flowed more evenly year-round. Pine Creek and its tributaries were home to large numbers of fish, including trout, but dams downstream on the Susquehanna River have eliminated the shad and eels once found here by blocking their migrations. Habitat for land animals was destroyed by the clearcutting of forests, but there was also a great deal of hunting, with bounties paid for large predators.

Upper Pine Bottom Run's virgin white pines were all clearcut, but in 1925 the Department of Forests and Waters reported "thrifty young growth has now taken in its place". In the 1920s chestnut blight killed almost all the American chestnut trees in the Tiadaghton State Forest, and oak trees suffered from oak leaf tier moths in the 1950s and oak leaf roller moths in 1967. Gypsy moths defoliated the state forest between 1978 and 1982. The surrounding state forest is "dominated by mixed oak forests", along with hardwoods such as ash, beech, birch, cherry, and maple, as well as hemlock and pine. The Pine Creek Gorge is home to over 225 species of wildflowers, plants and trees, 40 species of mammals, 245 species of birds, and 26 species of fish. Common animals include deer, squirrels, bear, eagles, wild turkey, and ravens.

== Recreation ==
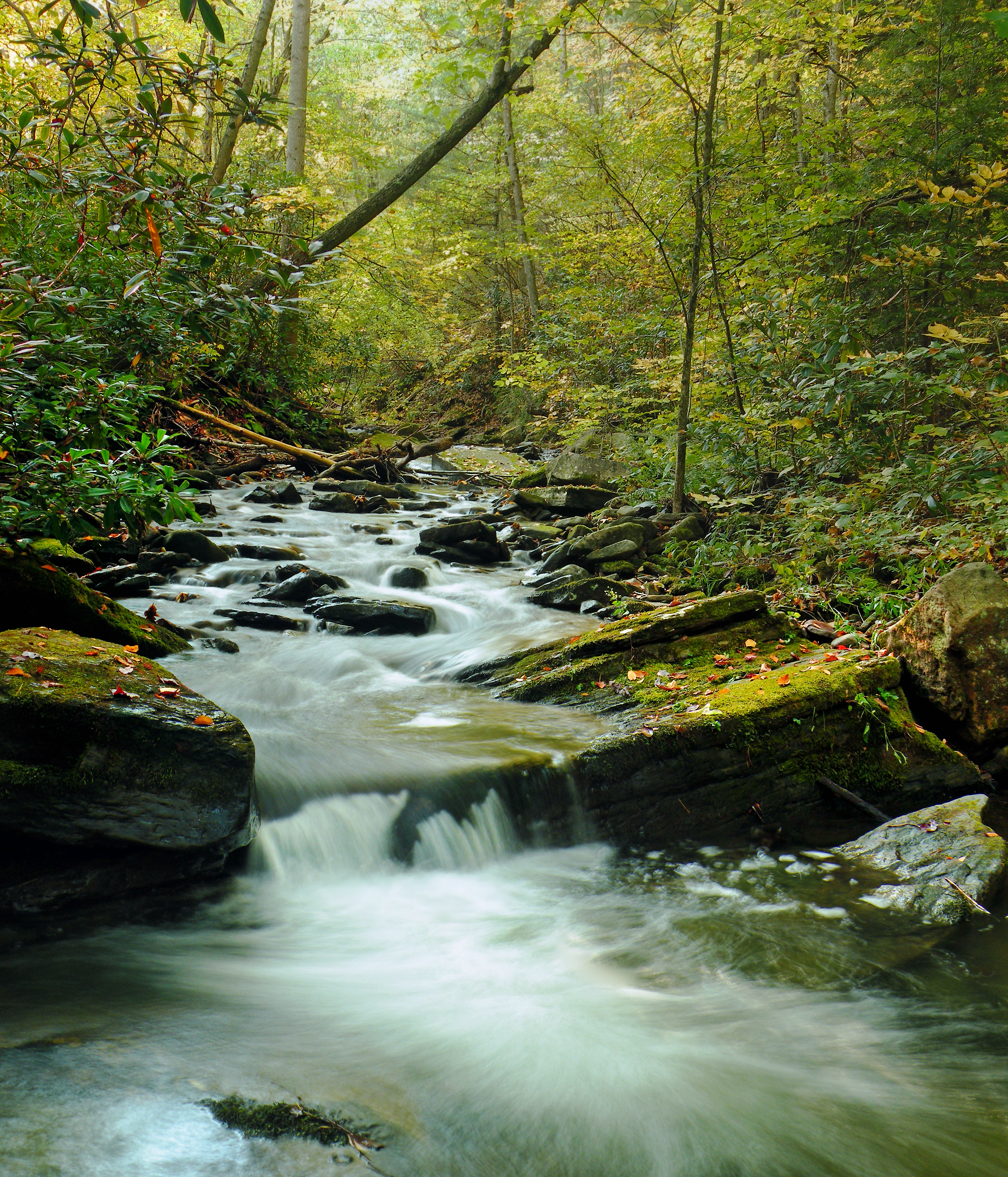
Autumnal view of Upper Pine Bottom Run in the park; it is state-approved and stocked for trout fishing in season.

As of 2017 recreational opportunities within the 5-acre (2.0 ha) Upper Pine Bottom State Park were limited to picknicking and fishing. Although the park was established in the early 1920s as a campground with a latrine, the park today has no campsites or sanitary facilities. Upper Pine Bottom Run was listed in a guide for trout and bass fishing in 1885, and in 1925 the Department of Forests and Waters said there was good fishing and hunting in the camp. Brown trout over 20 inches (51 cm) long were reported in the stream in 1994. All of Upper Pine Bottom Run has been designated as approved trout waters by the Pennsylvania Fish and Boat Commission, which means that it is stocked with trout and may be fished during trout season.

Upper Pine Bottom State Park also serves as a parking area and access point for the surrounding state forest, where recreational opportunities include hiking and hunting. The most common game animals are black bear, ruffed grouse, white-tailed deer, and wild turkey. The state forest trails are also open to mountain biking and horseback riding, and in winter are used for cross-country skiing and snowmobiling. Just north of the park is the 19-mile (31 km) Haneyville ATV Trail system for all-terrain vehicles. The parking area for the trail is on PA 44 at the site of the former CCC camp S-82-Pa, and the history of the stream is reflected in the names of three of the trails in the system: Furnace Trail (for the iron furnace), CCC Trail, and Plantation Loop (for the plantations of trees planted by the CCC).

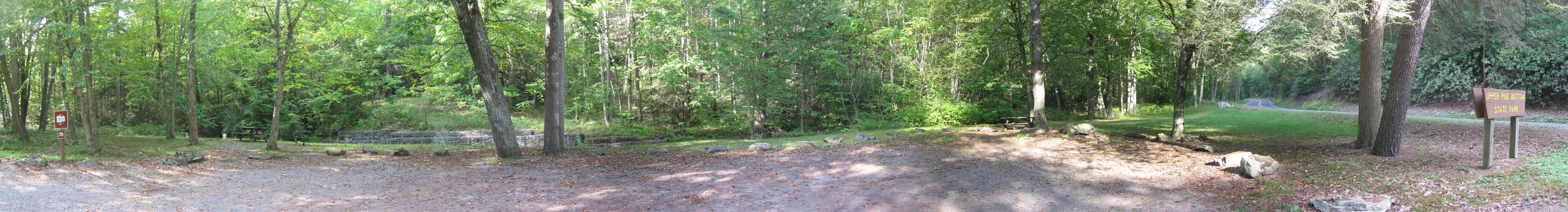
Panoramic view of the park from the parking area

== Notes ==
a. Morey and Harrison's History of Cherry Springs State Park says of the bridle path that became the Jersey Shore–Coudersport Turnpike: "It is interesting to note that the present-day Pennsylvania Route 44 follows the historic path with very few exceptions", but the history does not explicitly mention Upper Pine Bottom State Park. However, the official map of the Tiadaghton State Forest clearly shows the road south of Haneyville along the border between Lycoming and Clinton counties as "Old Coudersport Pike" (and not the road along Upper Pine Bottom Run).
b. For a detailed view showing the roof of the structure, see this image.
