= Torbert Island Natural Area =

Natural area in Pennsylvania

- Location within Pennsylvania
- Location: Lycoming County, Pennsylvania
- Nearest town: Jersey Shore
- Coordinates: 41°13′28″N 77°19′35″W
- Area: 18 acres (7.3 ha)

Torbert Island Natural Area is an 18-acre (7.3 ha) protected area in Lycoming County, Pennsylvania, United States. It is part of Tiadaghton State Forest. Torbert Island itself is 14 acres in size, and the protected area includes some other small islands nearby.

== Details ==
The Natural Area protects uninhabited islands in Pine Creek, about five miles north of that creek's confluence with the West Branch Susquehanna River. The islands host a rare example of a riparian forest in Pennsylvania, and include plant species that are relatively uncommon in the region such as jack-in-the-pulpit and dragon arum, plus trees such as river birch and sycamore. Torbert Island and the others in the Natural Area are not accessible by road and require rowing from put-in facilities on Pennsylvania Route 44.
