= Golden Eagle Trail =

Hiking trail in Pennsylvania, United States

Coordinates: 41.43823°N 77.51029°W

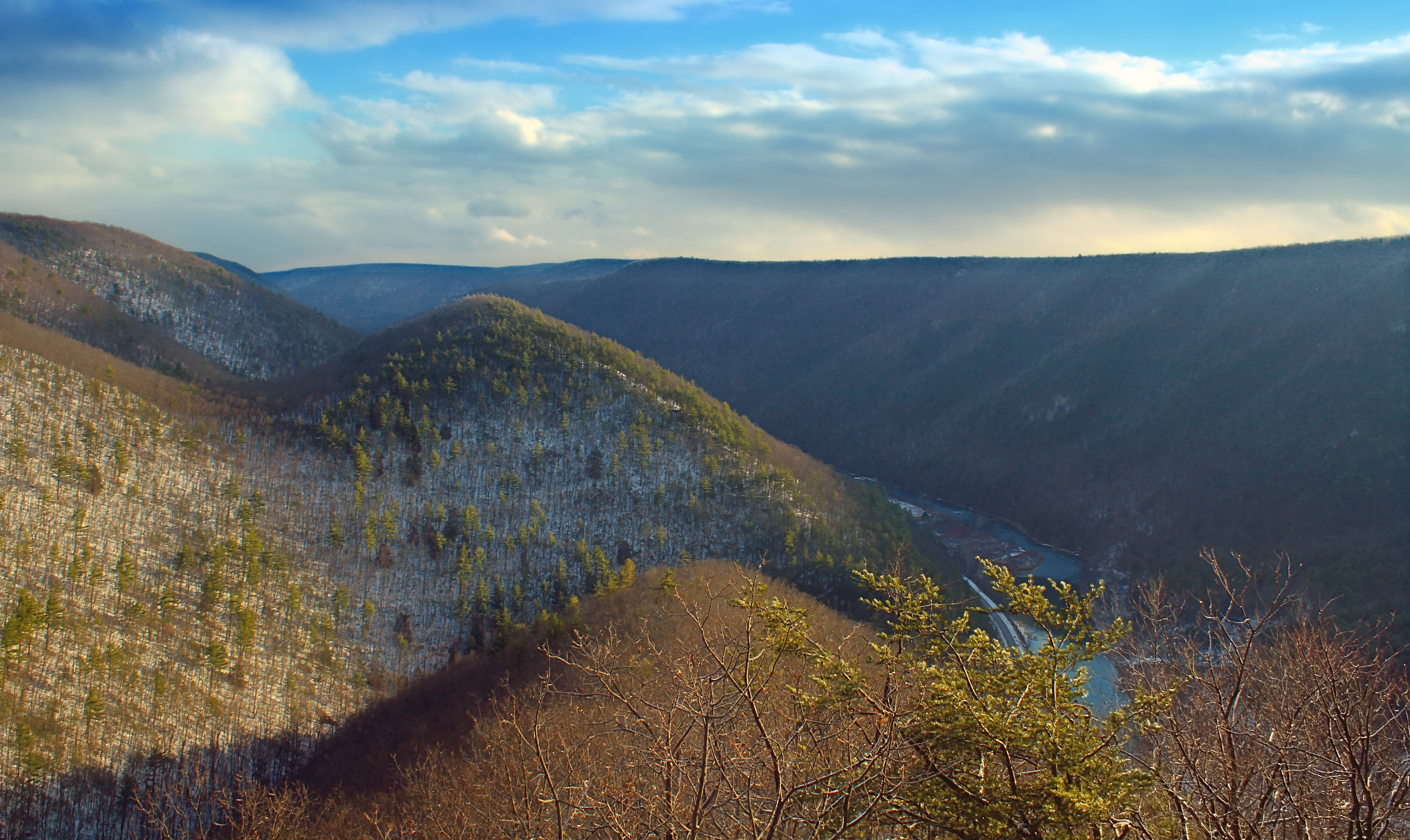
- View over Pine Creek Gorge, from Raven's Horn Vista on the Golden Eagle Trail.
- Length: 9.1 mi (14.6 km)
- Location: Lycoming County, Pennsylvania, US
- Trailheads: Pennsylvania Route 414
- Use: Hiking
- Elevation change: High
- Difficulty: Difficult
- Season: Year round (though not recommended during icy conditions)
- Hazards: Uneven and wet terrain, rattlesnakes, mosquitoes, ticks, black bears

The Golden Eagle Trail is a 10.1-mile (16.3 km) hiking trail in north-central Pennsylvania, forming a loop through a portion of Tiadaghton State Forest on the east side of Pine Creek Gorge. The trail also traverses Wolf Run Wild Area. Pennsylvania hiking expert Tom Thwaites stated that the Golden Eagle Trail "may be the best day hike in Penn's Woods".

== Route ==
The Golden Eagle Trail is a large loop with a short entrance trail. The entrance trail begins near Pine Creek at a parking lot off of Pennsylvania Route 414 north of the village of Cammal. The entrance trail begins climbing immediately up the side of Pine Creek Gorge, to the northeast and gently at first alongside Bonnell Run. The junction with the main loop is reached at 0.4 mile; hikers wishing to complete the loop in the clockwise direction would continue straight ahead here. The climb up Bonnell Run becomes increasingly steep and difficult with several wet crossings of the stream. The top of the plateau is reached at 3.3 miles; the trail turns to the south and passes several vistas looking to the east (away from Pine Creek Gorge).

The first significant vista over Pine Creek Gorge is reached at 4.3 miles, just before a steep descent into the hollow formed by Wolf Run. This segment also includes several wet stream crossings. At 7.0 miles and near the bottom of the hollow, a former route of the trail continues ahead a short distance to PA Route 414, but the official route now turns to the west and begins a very steep climb up a rocky ridgeline between Wolf Run and Bonnell Run. Raven's Horn Vista, named after its use as a nesting site by ravens and vultures, is reached at 7.6 miles, followed by a similar vista a short distance later. Both vistas offer views up and down Pine Creek Gorge. The trail descends off the ridgeline steeply and passes through a former farm pasture at 8.5 miles. The junction with the entrance trail is reached at 8.7 miles; here the hiker must turn south and repeat the entrance trail. The route ends at PA 414 after 9.1 miles.
