= Cummings Township, Lycoming County, Pennsylvania =

Township in Pennsylvania, US

Cummings Township, Pennsylvania
- Township
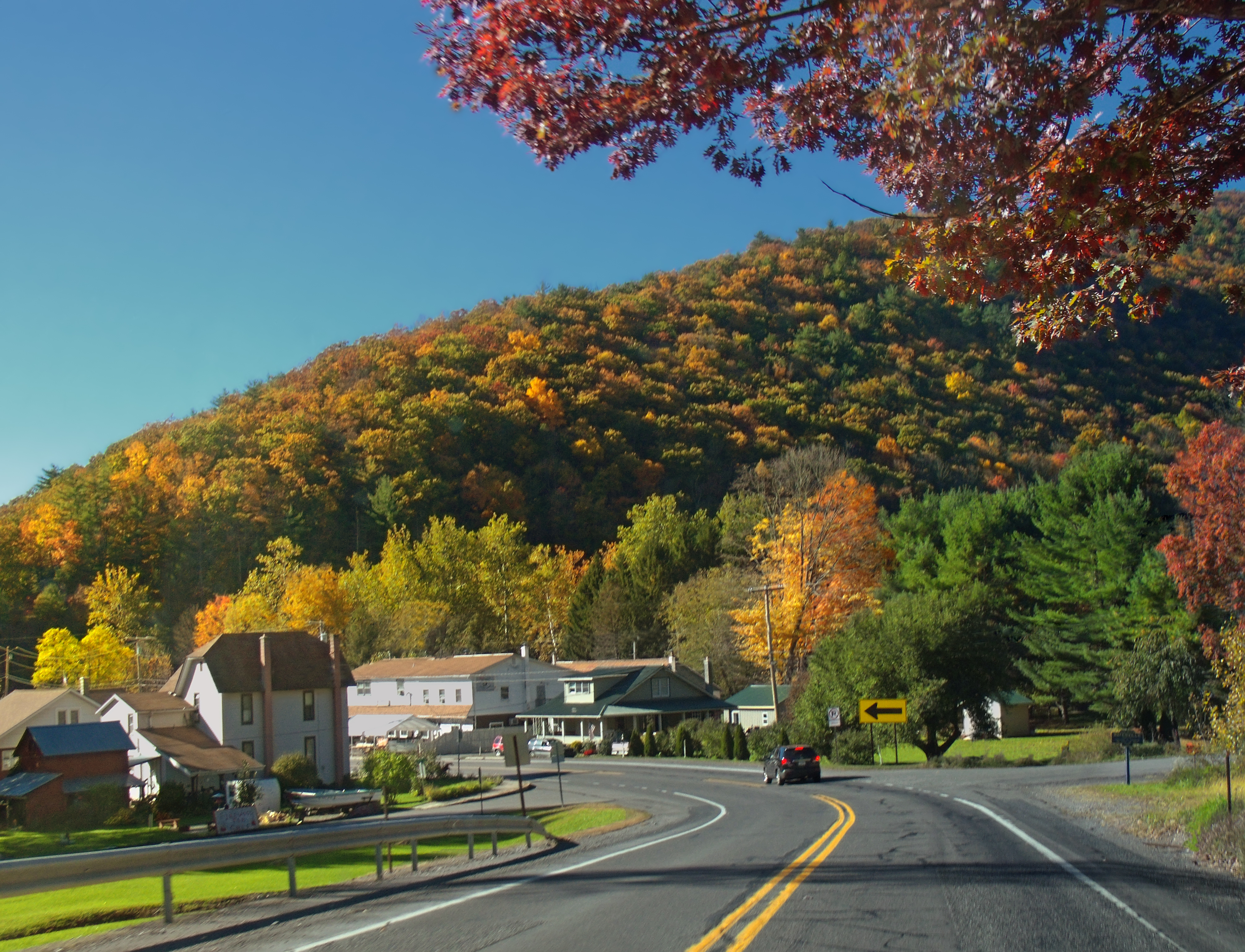
- Village of Waterville

- Logo

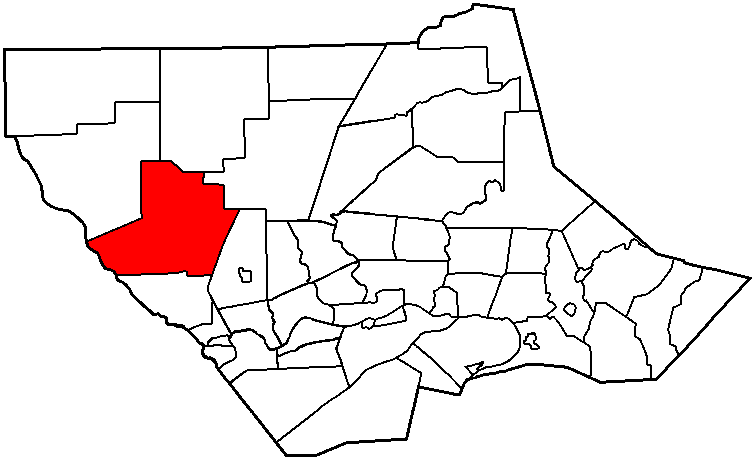
- Map of Lycoming County, Pennsylvania highlighting Cummings Township

- Map of Lycoming County, Pennsylvania
- Coordinates: 41°20′10″N 77°20′40″W
- Country: United States
- State: Pennsylvania
- County: Lycoming
- Settled: 1784
- Formed: 1832

Area
  - Total: 69.99 sq mi (181.28 km^{2})
  - Land: 69.37 sq mi (179.67 km^{2})
  - Water: 0.62 sq mi (1.61 km^{2}) 0.69%
- Elevation: 1,719 ft (524 m)

Population (2020)
  - Total: 264 ▼
  - Estimate (2021): 263
  - Density: 3.8/sq mi (1.47/km^{2})
- Time zone: UTC-5 (Eastern Time Zone (North America))
  - Summer (DST): UTC-4 (EDT)
- ZIP code: 17776
- Area code: 570
- FIPS code: 42-081-17696
- GNIS feature ID: 1216746
- Website: cummingstownship-pa.com

Cummings Township is a township in Lycoming County, Pennsylvania, United States. The population was 264 at the 2020 census, down from 273 in 2010. It is part of the Williamsport, Pennsylvania Metropolitan Statistical Area. Cummings Township is home to Little Pine State Park and Upper Pine Bottom State Park.

== History ==
Cummings Township was formed in 1832 from parts of Mifflin and Brown townships. It was named for John Cummings, who was an associate judge in the local court system at the time. Early industry in the county included quarries of flag and building stone and lumber.

The Little Pine Creek and Pine Creek valleys in Cummings Township were used by the Iroquois and Algonkian tribes as a hunting ground. Historians believe that there may have been a Shawnee village and burial ground just to the north of Little Pine State Park on Little Pine Creek.

By the mid 19th century the demand for lumber reached the Upper Pine Bottom area, where white pine and hemlock covered the surrounding mountainsides. Lumbermen came and harvested the trees and sent them down Pine Creek to the West Branch Susquehanna River to the Susquehanna Boom and sawmills at Williamsport. James and John English were the first to build a sawmill in the Little Pine area. They built two sawmills in 1809 on Little Pine Creek. In 1816, the village of English Mills sprang up around the two sawmills. The lumber era at Little Pine lasted until 1909, when the last log raft was floated down Little Pine Creek. Remnants of the lumber era can be seen today in and around the park.

Waterville is the most significant population center in Cummings Township. Michael and Henry Wolf arrived in the area from Berks County in 1817. They helped to establish Waterville by building a sawmill and clearing some land for farming. A post office was established in Waterville in 1849. Other early business establishments were two stores and a hotel, which stands today.

Tiadaghton State Forest lands were acquired by the state by the early 1900s. The site which became the Upper Pine Bottom State Park was the "Upper Pine Bottom Class B Public Campground" by 1924 (Class B Public Campgrounds were on secondary highways and had a lean-to shelter for camping). During the Great Depression, the Civilian Conservation Corps built a pavilion at the site in 1936, but it is no longer extant. The park was not officially transferred from the Bureau of Forests to State Parks until 1962.

== Geography ==
Cummings Township is in western Lycoming County and is bordered by Gallagher Township in Clinton County to the west, McHenry Township to the northwest, Pine Township to the north, Cogan House Township to the northeast, Mifflin Township to the east, and Watson Township to the south.

Pennsylvania Route 44 passes through the western part of the township, following Pine Creek south from Waterville and the side canyon of Upper Pine Bottom Run west from Waterville. PA 44 leads south 13 miles (21 km) to Jersey Shore and northwest 59 miles (95 km) to Coudersport. Pennsylvania Route 414 runs north up Pine Creek from Waterville, leading 16 miles (26 km) to Slate Run and 32 miles (51 km) to Morris.

According to the United States Census Bureau, the township has a total area of 70.0 square miles (181.3 km^{2}), of which 69.4 square miles (179.8 km^{2}) are land and 0.58 square miles (1.5 km^{2}), or 0.81%, are water. The township lies entirely in the Pine Creek drainage basin. Little Pine Creek, one of Pine Creek's major tributaries, has its confluence with Pine Creek in the unincorporated village of Waterville.

Cummings Township contains two Pennsylvania state parks. Little Pine State Park is on Little Pine Creek and Pennsylvania Route 4001, 4.0 miles (6.4 km) northeast of Waterville. Upper Pine Bottom State Park is on Upper Pine Bottom Run and Pennsylvania Route 44, 2 miles (3 km) west of Pine Creek and 3.5 miles (5.6 km) west of Waterville. Portions of Tiadaghton State Forest are also located in the township.

=== Waterville ===
Waterville is an unincorporated community in the dense woods of the Glaciated Allegheny Plateau in south-central Cummings Township. It lies in the deep valley of Pine Creek, Pine Creek Gorge, at the mouth of Little Pine Creek. Pennsylvania Route 44 travels through Waterville, heading south-southeastward along Pine Creek to the borough of Jersey Shore. The city of Williamsport, the county seat of Lycoming County, is 27 miles (43 km) southeast of Waterville.

== Demographics ==
Historical population
Census	Pop.	Note	%±
2010	273		—
2020	264		−3.3%
2021 (est.)	263		−0.4%
U.S. Decennial Census

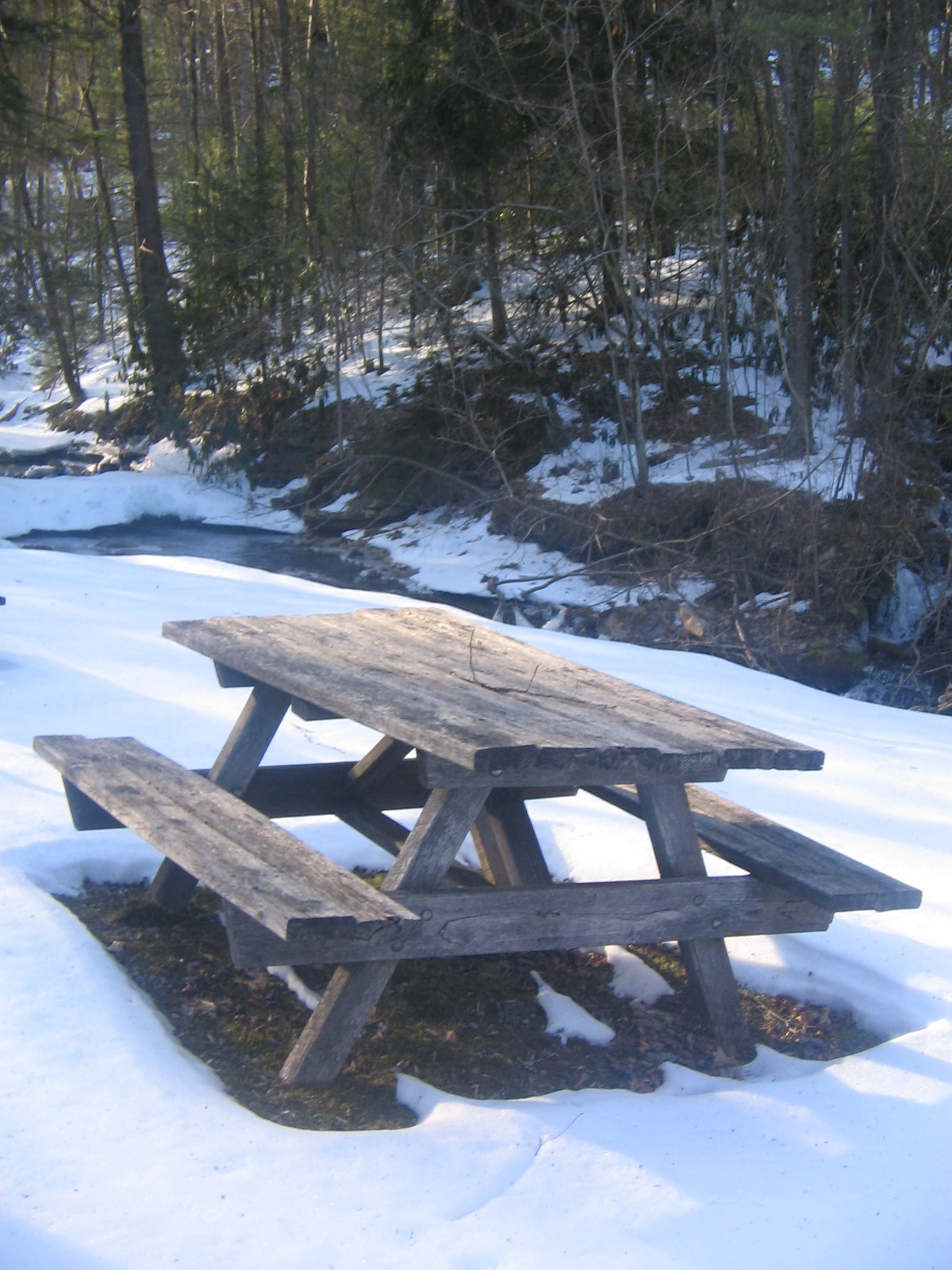
Picnic table and Upper Pine Bottom Run at Upper Pine Bottom State Park

As of the census of 2000, there were 355 people, 153 households, and 106 families residing in the township. The population density was 5.2 people per square mile (2.0/km^{2}). There were 400 housing units at an average density of 5.8/sq mi (2.2/km^{2}). The racial makeup of the township was 99.72% White and 0.28% African American. Hispanic or Latino of any race were 0.28% of the population.

There were 153 households, out of which 25.5% had children under the age of 18 living with them, 58.2% were married couples living together, 5.9% had a female householder with no husband present, and 30.1% were non-families. 22.9% of all households were made up of individuals, and 11.8% had someone living alone who was 65 years of age or older. The average household size was 2.31 and the average family size was 2.69.

In the township the population was spread out, with 20.8% under the age of 18, 5.1% from 18 to 24, 25.4% from 25 to 44, 27.9% from 45 to 64, and 20.8% who were 65 years of age or older. The median age was 44 years. For every 100 females there were 107.6 males. For every 100 females age 18 and over, there were 99.3 males.

The median income for a household in the township was $38,594, and the median income for a family was $42,292. Males had a median income of $33,125 versus $21,250 for females. The per capita income for the township was $18,626. About 6.2% of families and 5.5% of the population were below the poverty line, including none of those under age 18 and 5.4% of those age 65 or over.
