= Pennsylvania Route 49 =

State highway in Pennsylvania, US

Pennsylvania Route 49

Route information
- Maintained by PennDOT
- Length: 52.6 mi (84.7 km)
- Existed: 1928–present

Major junctions
- West end: PA 44 near Coudersport
- PA 449 in Gold; PA 349 in Westfield; PA 249 from Cowanesque to Knoxville; I-99 / US 15 in Lawrenceville
- East end: PA 287 in Lawrenceville

Location
- Country: United States
- State: Pennsylvania
- Counties: Potter, Tioga

Highway system
- Pennsylvania State Route System; Interstate; US; State; Scenic; Legislative
← PA 48	→ PA 50

Pennsylvania Route 49 (PA 49) is a 52.6-mile-long (84.7 km) state highway located in northern Pennsylvania. The western terminus of the route is at PA 44 three miles (5 km) north of Coudersport. The eastern terminus is at PA 287 in Lawrenceville less than 300 yards (270 m) south of the New York border. PA 49 serves as North Street, North Main Street, and Northern Potter Road in Ulysses, as Cowanesque Street in Lawrenceville, and as both East and West Main Street for Harrison Valley, Westfield, Knoxville, and Elkland. It is concurrent with PA 249 for 2.5 miles (4.0 km) between Cowanesque and Knoxville.

== Route description ==
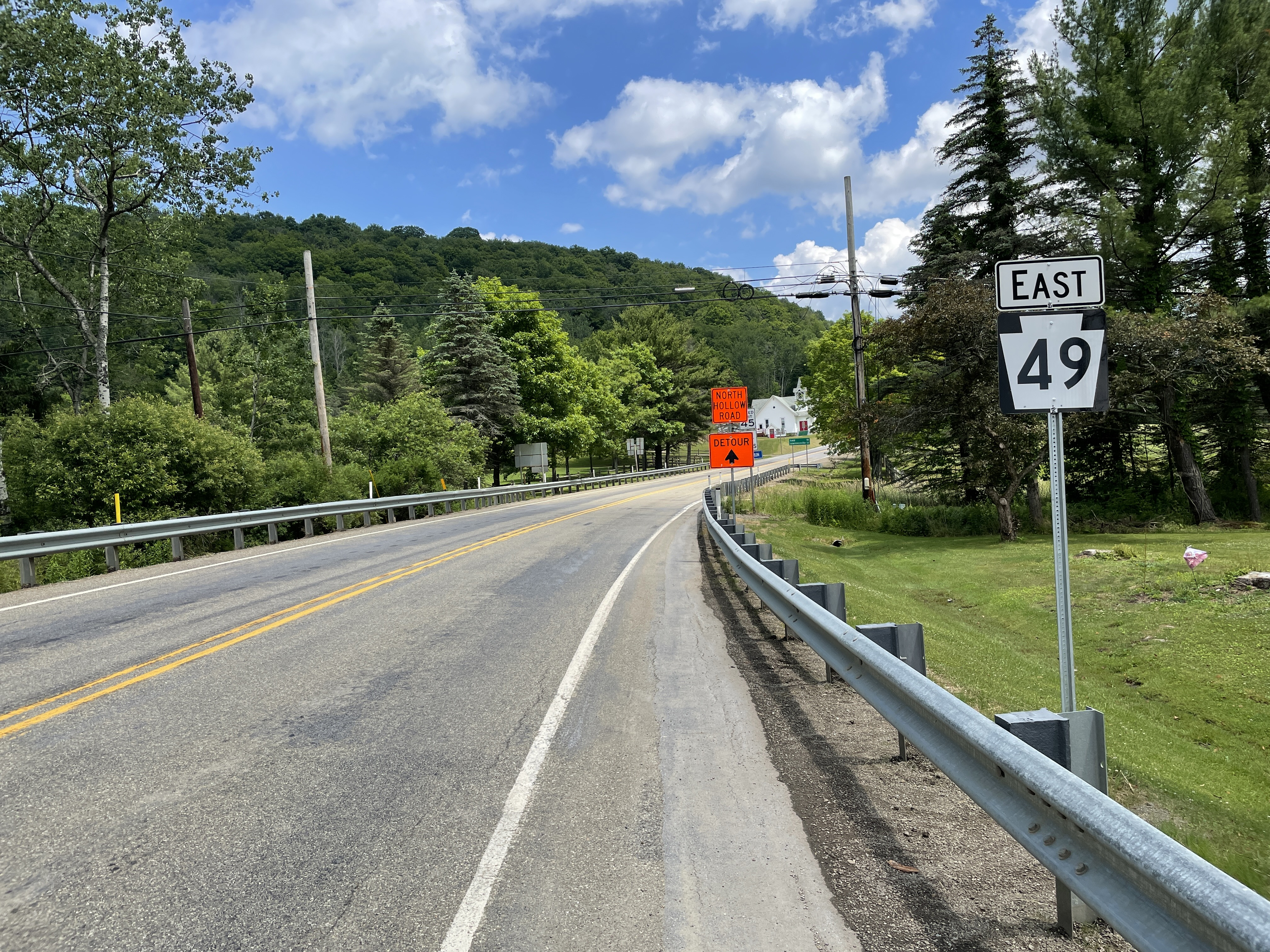
PA 49 eastbound past western terminus at PA 44 near Coudersport

PA 49 begins at an intersection with PA 44 north of the borough of Coudersport in Eulalia Township, Potter County, heading east on a two-lane undivided road. The route runs through forested areas of hills with some farm fields and homes to the north of the Allegheny River, turning northeast and crossing into Hebron Township. The road curves east and enters Allegany Township, curving back to the northeast and turning east again at Colesburg. PA 49 winds east through more rural areas, turning to the northeast away from the river into more agricultural areas with some woods and homes, running through Raymond. The road heads into Ulysses Township and comes to an intersection with PA 449 in the community of Gold.

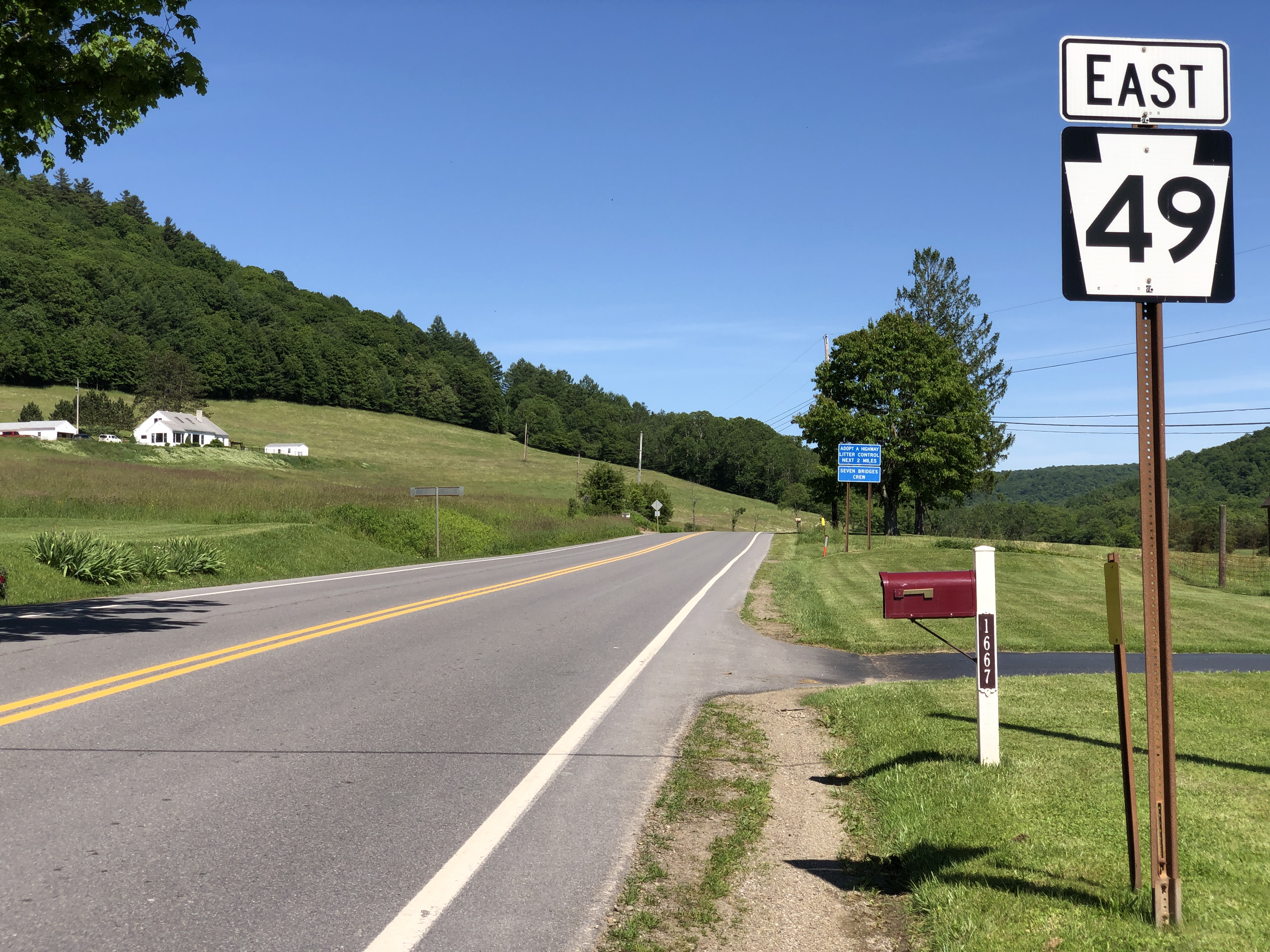
PA 49 eastbound in Allegany Township

The route crosses the Genesee River and continues through more farmland with some woodland and residences, passing through Kibboville Corners. PA 49 crosses into the borough of Ulysses and passes through more rural areas before turning east onto North Street, running past homes and a few businesses. The route turns north onto North Main Street and continues through residential areas, curving to the northeast. The road heads into a mix of farmland and woodland with some homes, entering Bingham Township and becoming Northern Potter Road. PA 49 continues through more rural areas, passing to the south of Northern Potter Junior Senior High School prior to crossing into Harrison Township and becoming an unnamed road. The road curves more to the east and passes through the residential community of Mills. The route passes through more agricultural areas with some woods and homes, becoming West Main Street and heading into the community of Harrison Valley. Here, PA 49 runs past homes and turns southeast onto East Main Street, passing more residences along with a few businesses. The road continues into a mix of farmland and woodland with a few homes, running to the northeast of the Cowanesque River. The route crosses the river and turns to the south-southeast, coming to Elmer. At this point, the road curves more to the southeast and crosses the Cowanesque River again, passing through more rural areas.

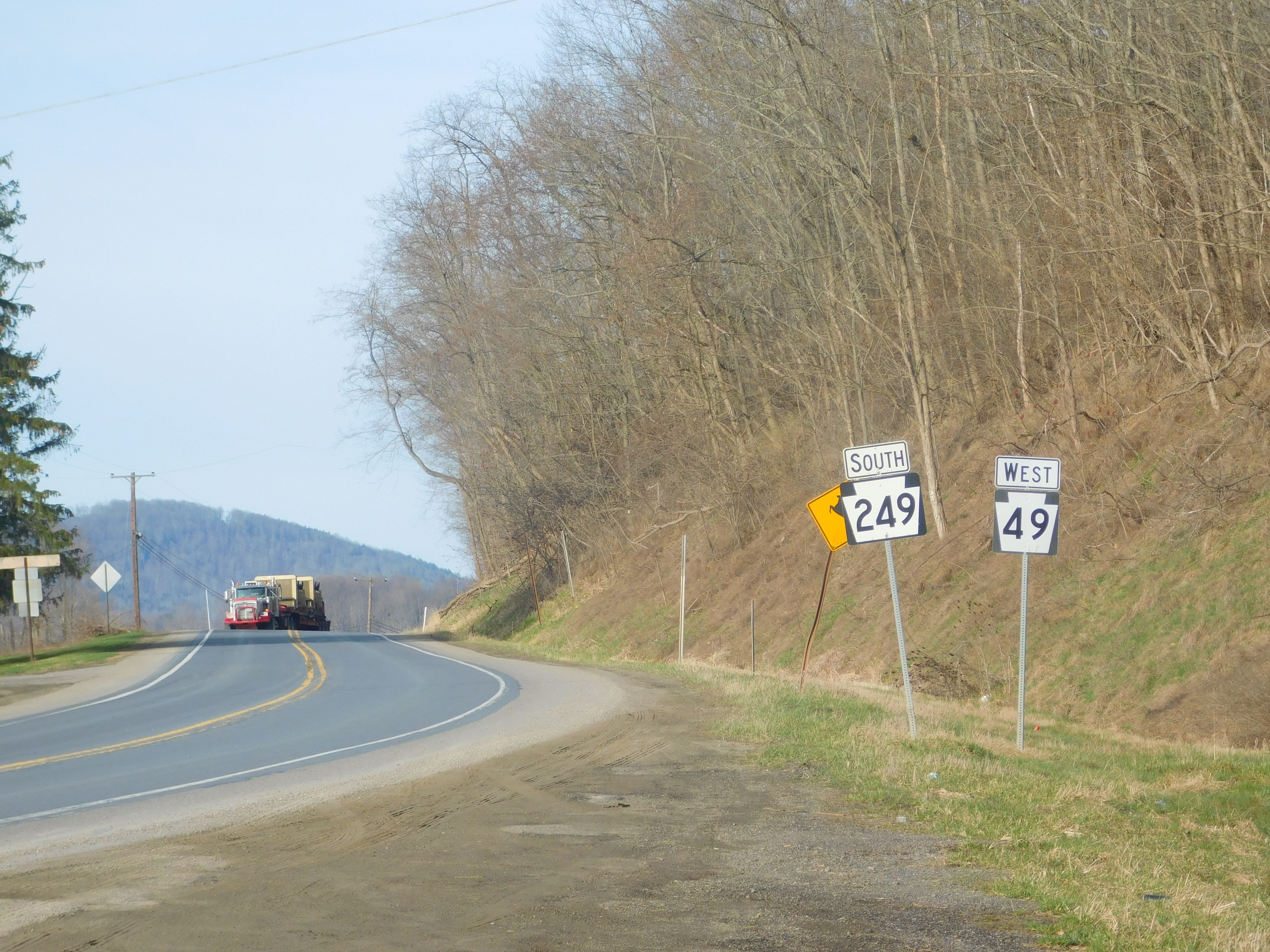
PA 49 westbound and PA 249 southbound in Knoxville

PA 49 enters Westfield Township in Tioga County and passes through the residential community of Potter Brook before heading through open agricultural areas with a few homes, crossing the Cowanesque River twice and passing south of Cowanesque Valley Junior Senior High School. The road crosses into the borough of Westfield and becomes West Main Street, passing residences and a few businesses, coming to another crossing of the Cowanesque River. The route heads into the commercial downtown of Westfield and intersects the northern terminus of PA 349, becoming East Main Street. PA 49 continues east-northeast near a few homes and crosses back into Westfield Township, heading into farmland with some residences and crossing the river again. The road continues through more rural areas with some homes, passing through Cowanesque before coming to an intersection with PA 249 in Phillips. Here, PA 249 turns northeast to form a concurrency with PA 49, heading through farmland and woodland with some residences. The road briefly passes through Brookfield Township before heading into Deerfield Township. PA 249 splits from PA 49 by turning to the north, and PA 49 crosses the Troups Creek into the borough of Knoxville, becoming West Main Street. The road heads through residential areas with some businesses, becoming East Main Street as it continues through the town.

The route heads back into Deerfield Township and continues through open agricultural areas with a few homes. PA 49 turns to the northeast and enters Osceola Township, running through more rural areas. The road heads near some farms and woods before curving to the east and passing through the residential community of Osceola. The route passes through agricultural areas prior to entering the borough of Elkland and becoming West Main Street, lined with homes. PA 49 heads through the commercial downtown and becomes East Main Street, continuing through more residential areas. The road crosses into Nelson Township and crosses the Cowanesque River, becoming Barney Hill Road and passing through farmland with a few homes. The route crosses the river again and heads through a mix of woods and fields prior to another crossing of the Cowanesque River, at which point it passes to the south of Cowanesque Lake. PA 49 continues through a mix of farmland and woodland with a few homes to the south of the lake, forming the southern boundary of the Cowanesque Lake National Recreation Area and crossing into Lawrence Township. The road continues through more rural areas, turning to the northeast and coming to a diamond interchange with I-99/US 15 past the lake. The route enters the borough of Lawrenceville and passes through farmland with a few homes as Cowanesque Street. PA 49 comes to its eastern terminus at an intersection with the northern terminus of PA 287 in the commercial center of Lawrenceville a short distance south of the New York border.

== Major intersections ==
County	Location	mi	km	Destinations	Notes
Potter	Eulalia Township	0.0	0.0	PA 44 (Steer Brook Road) – Coudersport, Shinglehouse	Western terminus
Potter	Ulysses Township	10.6	17.1	PA 449 (Brooklyn Road) – Genesee, Galeton	
Tioga	Westfield	28.9	46.5	PA 349 south (Church Street) – Sabinsville	Northern terminus of PA 349
Tioga	Westfield Township	32.1	51.7	PA 249 south – Little Marsh	West end of PA 249 overlap
Tioga	Deerfield Township	34.6	55.7	PA 249 north – Austinburg	East end of PA 249 overlap
Tioga	Lawrence Township	52.3	84.2	I-99 / US 15 – Corning, Mansfield	Exit 196 on I-99
Tioga	Lawrenceville	53.0	85.3	PA 287 south (Main Street) – Tioga	Eastern terminus; northern terminus of PA 287
1.000 mi = 1.609 km; 1.000 km = 0.621 mi: Concurrency terminus
