= Troups Creek =

River in Pennsylvania, US

Coordinates: 41°57′6.26″N 77°26′25.94″W

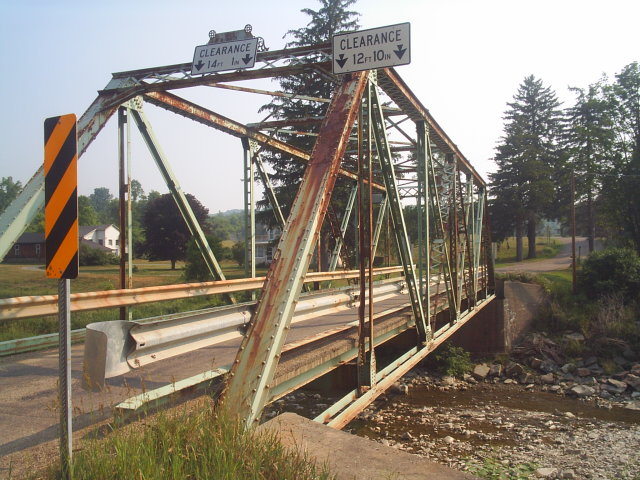
Austinburg Bridge and Troups Creek in Brookfield Township, PA

Troups Creek is a tributary of the Cowanesque River in Steuben County, New York and Tioga County, Pennsylvania, in the United States. It is approximately 15.2 miles (24.5 km) long and flows through Troupsburg in Steuben County, New York and Brookfield Township, Deerfield Township, and Knoxville in Tioga County, Pennsylvania. It is possible to canoe on portions of the creek at times.

== Course ==
Troups Creek begins in northern Troupsburg, Steuben County, New York. It flows southeast for several miles before turning east for some distance. The creek then turns south and begins flowing parallel to New York State Route 36. After several miles, it passes Young Hickory Hollow and Squab Hollow and turns south-southeast and then southeast. Several miles further downstream, the creek exits Troupsburg and Steuben County.

Upon exiting Steuben County, New York, Troups Creek enters Brookfield Township, Tioga County, Pennsylvania. In this township, the creek almost immediately receives the tributary North Brook and begins flowing parallel to Pennsylvania Route 249. A short distance further downstream, it picks up the tributaries South Brook Troups Creek and Biscuit Hollow. The creek then enters Deerfield Township, Tioga County and continues southeast, receiving the tributaries Christie Run and Crotch Run. Some distance later, the creek turns south and enters the community of Knoxville. In Knoxville, it crosses Pennsylvania Route 49 and reaches its confluence with the Cowanesque River.

== Geography ==
The elevation near the mouth of Troups Creek is 1,233 feet (376 m) above sea level.

The valley of Troups Creek is narrow and contains pastures. Floodplains inhabited by sycamore trees are also found on some areas of the creek. The creek has low banks, which have riprap on them in places. There are thick deposits of cobbles, gravel bars, and rock gardens on it. However, the creek has only a few strainers.

Troups Creek has a gauging station on Pennsylvania Route 49.

== Recreation ==
It is possible to canoe on 6.8 miles (10.9 km) of Troups Creek during a rapid snowmelt or within two days of heavy rain. The difficulty rating of the creek is 2. Edward Gertler describes the scenery along it as "good" in his book Keystone Canoeing.

== See also ==
- List of rivers of New York
- List of rivers of Pennsylvania
