= Pennsylvania Route 349 =

State highway in Tioga County, Pennsylvania, US

Pennsylvania Route 349

Route information
- Maintained by PennDOT
- Length: 13.345 mi (21.477 km)
- Existed: 1928–present

Major junctions
- South end: US 6 in Gaines Township
- North end: PA 49 in Westfield

Location
- Country: United States
- State: Pennsylvania
- Counties: Tioga

Highway system
- Pennsylvania State Route System; Interstate; US; State; Scenic; Legislative
← PA 348	→ PA 350

Pennsylvania Route 349 (PA 349) is a 13.3-mile-long (21.4 km) state highway located in Tioga County, Pennsylvania. The southern terminus is at U.S. Route 6 (US 6) in Gaines Township. The northern terminus is at PA 49 in Westfield.

== Route description ==
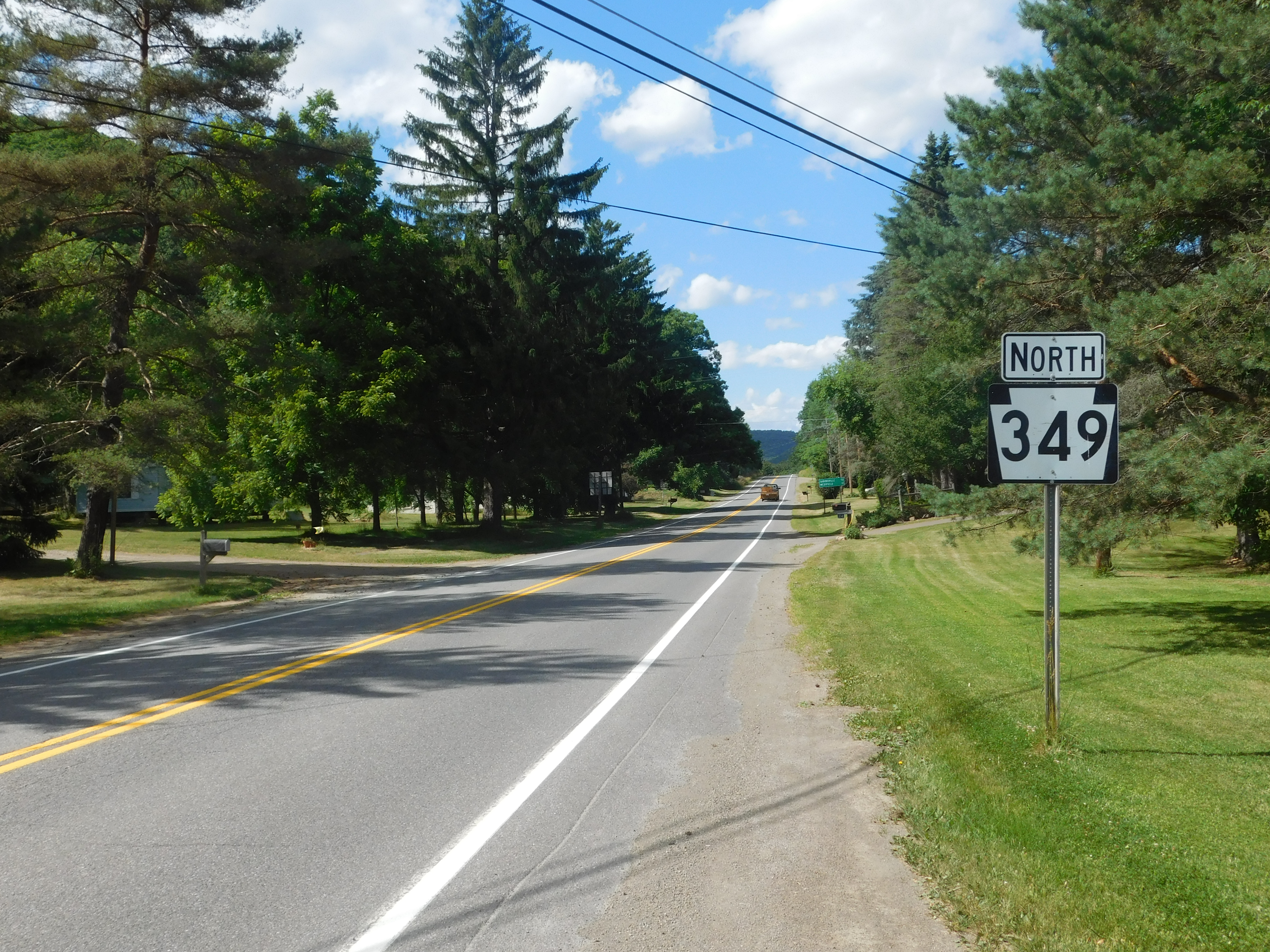
PA 349 north of US 6 in Gaines

PA 349 begins at an intersection with US 6 in Gaines Township, heading north on a two-lane undivided road. The route heads through forested areas of mountains within State Game Lands Number 208, running to the west of Long Run. Farther north, the road enters Clymer Township and passes through Davis as it turns northeast into areas of farmland and wooded mountains, heading away from Long Run and following Elklick Run. PA 349 reaches the residential community of Sabinsville and curves north again as it heads into Westfield Township. Here, the route passes through more rural areas of farms and woods with a few homes, running to the west of Mill Creek. Upon reaching the borough of Westfield, PA 349 becomes Church Street and runs past residences before ending at PA 49.

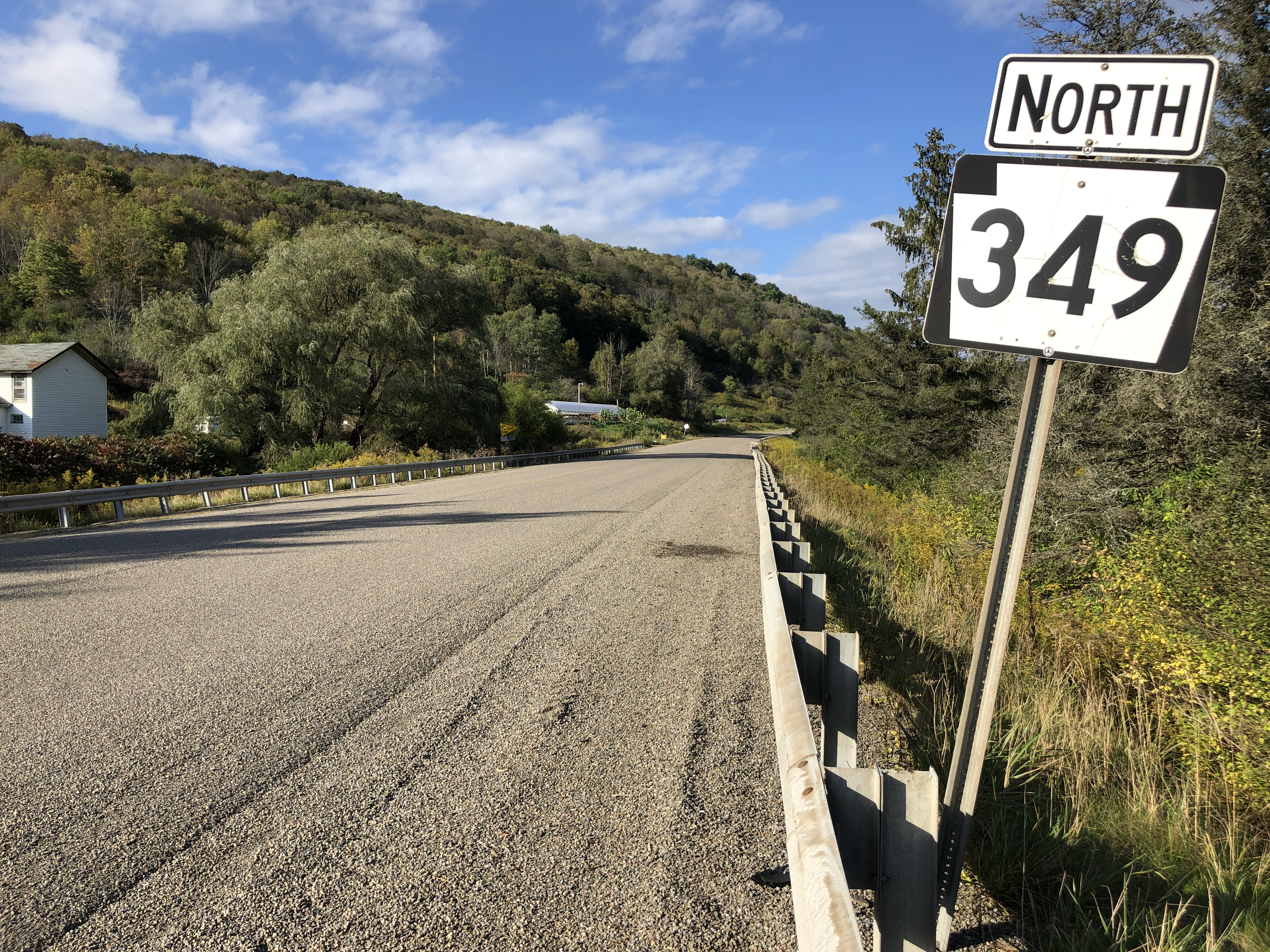
PA 349 northbound at Wattles Run Road in Clymer Township

== Major intersections ==
The entire route is in Tioga County.

Location	mi	km	Destinations	Notes
Gaines Township	0.000	0.000	US 6 – Wellsboro, Coudersport	Southern terminus
Westfield	13.345	21.477	PA 49 (Main Street) – Coudersport, Knoxville	Northern terminus
1.000 mi = 1.609 km; 1.000 km = 0.621 mi
