= Pennsylvania Route 249 =

State highway in Tioga County, Pennsylvania, US

Pennsylvania Route 249

Route information
- Maintained by PennDOT
- Length: 22.1 mi (35.6 km)
- Existed: 1928–present

Major junctions
- South end: PA 287 in Middlebury Township
- PA 49 from Cowanesque to Knoxville
- North end: NY 36 at the New York state line in Brookfield Township

Location
- Country: United States
- State: Pennsylvania
- Counties: Tioga

Highway system
- Pennsylvania State Route System; Interstate; US; State; Scenic; Legislative
← PA 248	→ PA 250
← PA 148	→ PA 150

Pennsylvania Route 249 (PA 249) is a 22.1-mile-long (35.6 km) state highway located in Tioga County, Pennsylvania. The southern terminus is at PA 287 in Middlebury Township. The northern terminus is at New York State Route 36 (NY 36) at the New York state line north of Knoxville.

== Route description ==
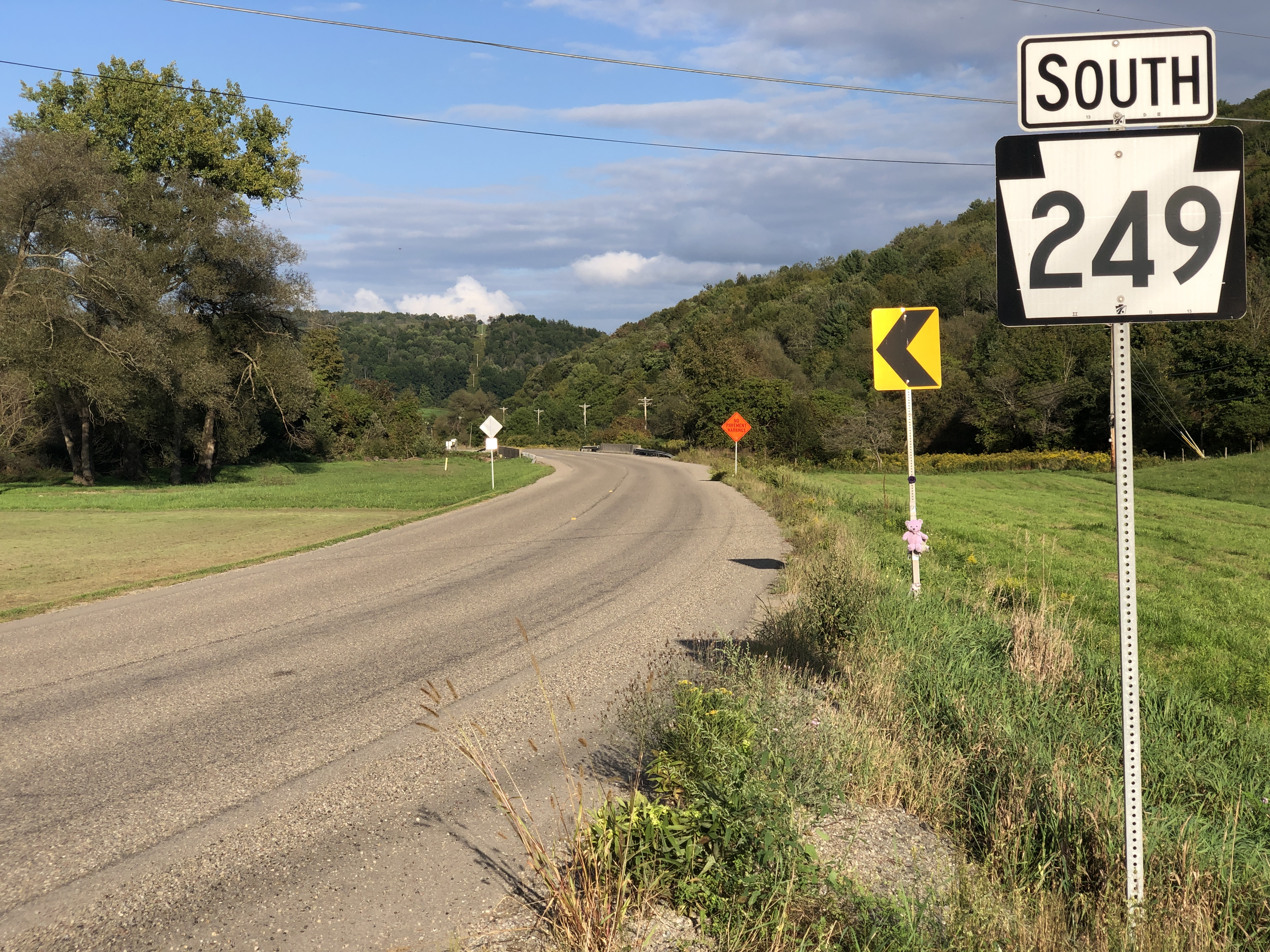
PA 249 southbound at Short Hill Road in Chatham Township

PA 249 begins at an intersection with PA 287 in the community of Middlebury Center in Middlebury Township, heading northwest on a two-lane undivided road. The route passes through a mix of farmland and forested hills, turning west and running through Kenneyville. The road continues through agricultural areas with some homes, crossing into Chatham Township and passing through Shortsville. PA 249 winds west-northwest through a mix of farmland and woodland with occasional residential development, going through the community of Little Marsh. The road heads into more forested areas and continues west before turning northwest into a mix of farms and woods, entering Westfield Township. The route heads north through more rural areas with occasional homes, crossing the Cowanesque River and reaching an intersection with PA 49 in Phillips. Here, PA 249 turns northeast to form a concurrency with PA 49 on East Main Street, heading through farmland and woodland with some residences. The road briefly passes through Brookfield Township before heading into Deerfield Township. PA 249 splits from PA 49 to the west of the borough of Knoxville by heading north on an unnamed road, running to the west of Troups Creek. The road turns to the northwest and heads through more agricultural and wooded areas with some homes. PA 249 heads back into Brookfield Township as Troups Creek Road and passes through Austinburg before reaching its northern terminus at the New York border. At this point, the road continues into that state as NY 36.

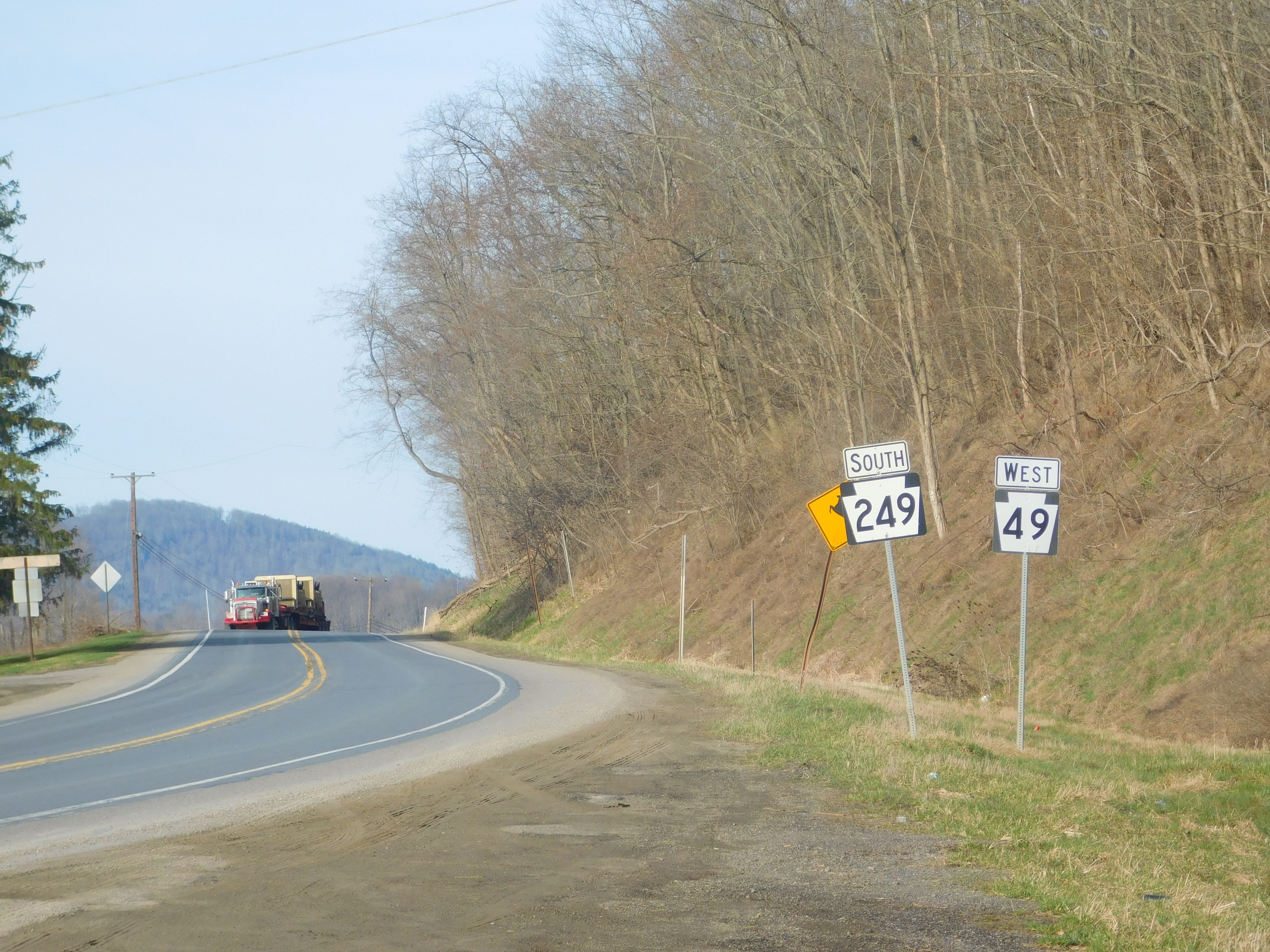
PA 249 southbound and PA 49 westbound in Knoxville

== History ==
The portion of PA 249 from PA 49 in Knoxville to the New York state line near Austinburg was originally designated as PA 149 from 1928 until 1946, when it was replaced by an extended PA 249.

== Major intersections ==
The entire route is in Tioga County.

Location	mi	km	Destinations	Notes
Middlebury Township	0.0	0.0	PA 287 – Tioga, Wellsboro	Southern terminus
Brookfield Township	15.2	24.5	PA 49 west (East Main Street) – Westfield, Coudersport	South end of PA 49 concurrency
Knoxville	17.7	28.5	PA 49 east (East Main Street) – Lawrenceville	North end of PA 49 concurrency
Brookfield Township	22.1	35.6	NY 36 north (Main Street) – Jasper	New York state line, continues as NY 36
1.000 mi = 1.609 km; 1.000 km = 0.621 mi: Concurrency terminus
