= Northern Tioga School District =

School district in Pennsylvania

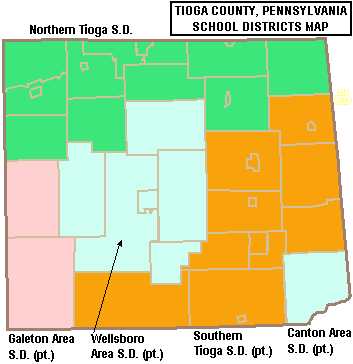

Address
- 110 Ellison Road Elkland, Tioga County, Pennsylvania, 16920-1305; United States

District information
- Type: Public
- Superintendent: Kristopher Kaufman
- Schools: 5
- NCES District ID: 4217730

Students and staff
- Students: 1,995 (2022-23)
- Teachers: 163.00 (FTE)
- Student–teacher ratio: 12.24

Other information
- Website: https://www.ntiogasd.org/

The Northern Tioga School District (NTSD) is a rural public school district operating in Tioga County, Pennsylvania, US. The district serves an extensive rural region, spanning 335 square miles (870 km^{2}) across the northern section of Tioga County. Northern Tioga School District is a third class school district having less than 30,000 residents and is one of the 500 public school districts of Pennsylvania. Municipalities served include: Tioga, Tioga Township, Jackson Township, Lawrenceville, Lawrence Township, Farmington Township, Elkland, Osceola Township, Knoxville, Chatham Township, Deerfield Township, Brookfield, Westfield, and Clymer Township. According to 2000 federal census data, it served a resident population of 14,670. By 2010, the district's population declined to 14,523 people. The educational attainment levels for the Northern Tioga School District population (25 years old and over) were 85.6% high school graduates and 11.7% college graduates.

According to the Pennsylvania Budget and Policy Center, 44.6% of the district's pupils lived at 185% or below the Federal Poverty Level as shown by their eligibility for the federal free or reduced price school meal programs in 2012. In 2009, the district residents’ per capita income was $14,920, while the median family income was $35,792. In the Commonwealth, the median family income was $49,501 and the United States median family income was $49,445, in 2010. In Tioga County, the median household income was $40.338.

== Schools ==
=== Secondary (Grades 7-12) ===
- Cowanesque Valley Junior-Senior High School
- Williamson Senior High School

Elkland Area High School was closed in 2011 due to low enrollment. High school students do not have access to a vocational training school.

=== Primary (Grades K-6) ===
- Clark Wood Elementary School
- R.B. Walter Elementary School
- Westfield Area Elementary School

== Extracurriculars ==
The Northern Tioga School District offers an extensive program of after school clubs, arts programs and an interscholastic athletics program.

Williamson High School sports

The district funds:

Boys

- Baseball – A
- Basketball- A
- Soccer – A
- Track and Field – AA
- Wrestling – AA

Girls

- Basketball – AA
- Cheerleading – AAAA
- Soccer (Fall) – A
- Softball – A
- Track and Field – AA
- Volleyball – A

Junior High School Sports

Boys

- Basketball
- Soccer
- Track and Field
- Wrestling

Girls

- Basketball
- Soccer (Fall)
- Track and Field
- Volleyball

According to PIAA directory July 2015

Cowanesque Valley Junior Senior High School sports

Boys

- Baseball – A
- Basketball – A
- Cross Country – AA
- Football – A
- Golf – AA
- Tennis – AA
- Track and Field – AA

Girls

- Basketball – A
- Cross Country – AA
- Golf – AA
- Softball – A
- Girls' Tennis – AA
- Track and Field
- Volleyball – A

Junior High School Sports

Boys

- Basketball
- Cross Country
- Football
- Track and Field

Girls

- Basketball
- Cross Country
- Track and Field
- Volleyball
