= Cowanesque =

Cowanesque may refer to:

- Cowanesque, Pennsylvania, a community in Tioga County
- Cowanesque Lake, a US Army Corps of Engineers flood prevention lake in Pennsylvania
- Cowanesque River, a tributary of the Tioga River in Pennsylvania and New York
- Cowanesque Rock, an island of Alaska
- Cowanesque Valley Railroad
- Corning, Cowanesque and Antrim Railway
- USS Cowanesque (AO-79), originally named the SS Fort Duquesne, a type T2 tanker
