= Cowanesque Valley Junior Senior High School =

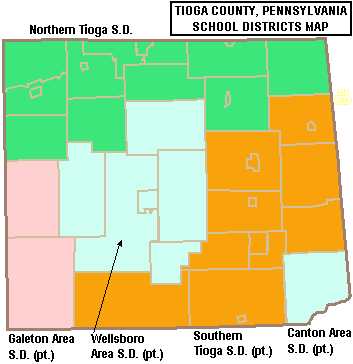
- Map shows Tioga County school district regions

Location
- 51 North Fork Road; Westfield, Tioga County, Pennsylvania 16950-1411; United States; 41.9196°N 77.5666°W

Information
- Type: Public
- NCES District ID: 4217730
- NCES School ID: 421773004058
- Principal: Matthew Sottolano
- Teaching staff: 28.78 (FTE)
- Grades: 7th -12th
- Enrollment: 379 (2023-2024)
- Student to teacher ratio: 13.17
- Language: English
- Colors: Blue & Gold
- Website: https://www.ntiogasd.org/cowanesque-valley-high-school/

Cowanesque Valley Junior Senior High School is a diminutive, rural public high school. It is located at 51 North Fork Road, Westfield, in the western region of Tioga County, in Pennsylvania, USA. It is one of two public high schools operated by Northern Tioga School District. In 2015, Cowanesque Valley Junior Senior High School's enrollment was reported as 390 pupils in 7th through 12th grades Cowanesque Valley Junior Senior High School employed 35 teachers in 2013. Per the Pennsylvania Department of Education, 100% of the teachers were rated "Highly Qualified" under the federal No Child Left Behind Act.

The BLaST Intermediate Unit IU17 provides the Cowanesque Valley Junior Senior High School with a wide variety of services like specialized education for disabled students and hearing, background checks for employees, state mandated recognizing and reporting child abuse training, speech and visual disability services and professional development for staff and faculty.

== Extracurriculars ==
The Northern Tioga School District offers an extensive program of after school clubs, arts programs and an interscholastic athletics program.

=== Sports ===
Cowanesque Valley Junior Senior High School sports

Boys

- Baseball - A
- Basketball - AA
- Cross Country - A
- Football - AA
- Golf - AA
- Tennis - AA

Girls

- Basketball - AA
- Cross Country - AA
- Softball - A
- Girls' Tennis - AA
- Volleyball - A

Junior High School Sports

Boys

- Baseball
- Basketball
- Cross Country
- Football

Girls

- Basketball
- Cross Country
- Softball
- Volleyball

According to PIAA directory
