= Harrison Valley, Pennsylvania =

Unincorporated community in Pennsylvania, US

- Unincorporated community
- Location within Pennsylvania
- Coordinates: 41°56′31″N 77°38′58″W
- Country: United States
- State: Pennsylvania
- County: Potter
- Elevation: 1,617 ft (493 m)
- Time zone: UTC-5 (Eastern (EST))
  - Summer (DST): UTC-4 (EDT)
- ZIP code: 16927
- Area code: 814
- GNIS feature ID: 1176589

Harrison Valley is an unincorporated community in Potter County, Pennsylvania, United States. The community is located along Pennsylvania Route 49, 5.9 miles (9.5 km) west-northwest of Westfield.
