= Gaines Township =

Gaines Township may refer to the following places in the United States:

- Gaines Township, Genesee County, Michigan
- Gaines Township, Kent County, Michigan
- Gaines Township, Pennsylvania
