= Westfield Township, Pennsylvania =

Township in Pennsylvania, US

Coordinates: 41°54′00″N 77°31′59″W

- Township
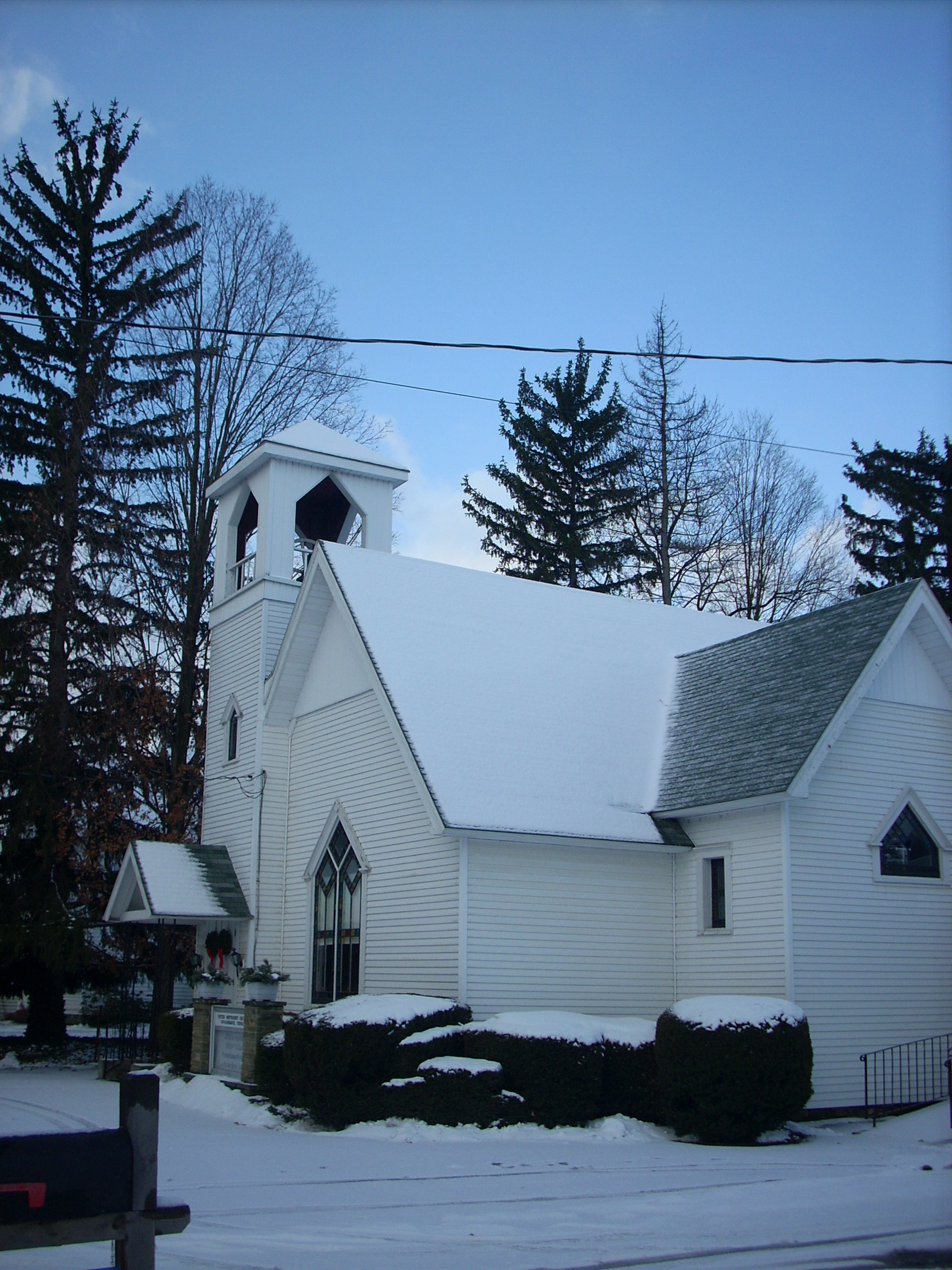
- A United Methodist Church in Westfield Township

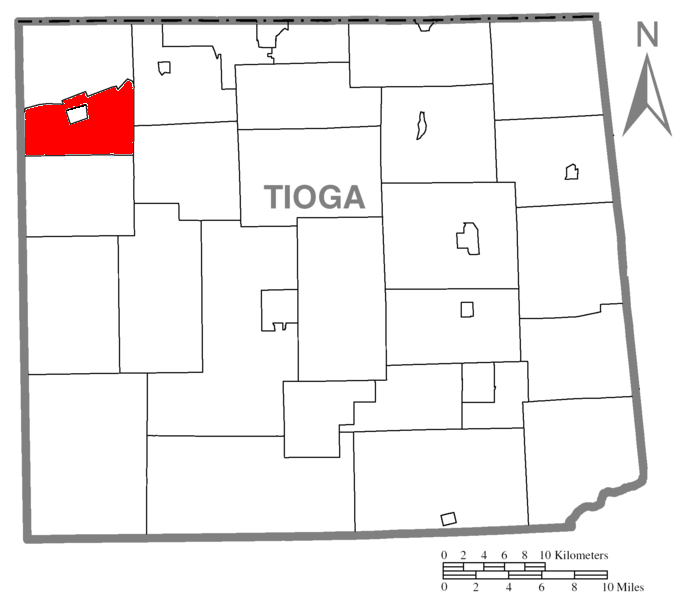
- Map of Tioga County Highlighting Westfield Township

- Map of Pennsylvania highlighting Tioga County
- Country: United States
- State: Pennsylvania
- County: Tioga
- Settled: 1809
- Incorporated: 1821

Area
  - Total: 23.09 sq mi (59.80 km^{2})
  - Land: 23.09 sq mi (59.80 km^{2})
  - Water: 0 sq mi (0.00 km^{2})

Population (2020)
  - Total: 988 ▼
  - Estimate (2023): 970
  - Density: 43.8/sq mi (16.91/km^{2})
- Time zone: Eastern Time Zone (North America)
  - Summer (DST): EDT
- FIPS code: 42-117-82976

Historical population
Census	Pop.	Note	%±
2000	849		—
2010	1,047		23.3%
2020	988		−5.6%
2023 (est.)	970		−1.8%
U.S. Decennial Census

Westfield Township is a township in Tioga County, Pennsylvania, United States. The population was 988 at the 2020 census.

== Geography ==
According to the United States Census Bureau, the township has a total area of 23.7 square miles (61.4 km^{2}), all land.

Westfield Township is bordered by Brookfield Township to the north, Deerfield and Chatham Townships to the east, Clymer Township to the south and Harrison and Hector Townships in Potter County to the west.

== Demographics ==
As of the census of 2000, there were 849 people, 338 households, and 267 families residing in the township. The population density was 35.8 inhabitants per square mile (13.8/km^{2}). There were 377 housing units at an average density of 15.9/sq mi (6.1/km^{2}). The racial makeup of the township was 99.18% White, 0.24% Native American, 0.12% Asian, 0.12% from other races, and 0.35% from two or more races. Hispanic or Latino of any race were 0.24% of the population.

There were 338 households, out of which 32.8% had children under the age of 18 living with them, 64.5% were married couples living together, 9.8% had a female householder with no husband present, and 21.0% were non-families. 19.2% of all households were made up of individuals, and 9.5% had someone living alone who was 65 years of age or older. The average household size was 2.51 and the average family size was 2.80.

In the township the population was spread out, with 24.3% under the age of 18, 5.3% from 18 to 24, 25.8% from 25 to 44, 26.5% from 45 to 64, and 18.1% who were 65 years of age or older. The median age was 42 years. For every 100 females, there were 95.6 males. For every 100 females age 18 and over, there were 90.2 males.

The median income for a household in the township was $32,500, and the median income for a family was $33,421. Males had a median income of $30,125 versus $21,875 for females. The per capita income for the township was $13,506. About 13.5% of families and 15.7% of the population were below the poverty line, including 19.9% of those under age 18 and 17.2% of those age 65 or over.

== Communities and locations ==
- Cowanesque – A village on Pennsylvania Route 49 in the northeastern part of the township.
- Phillips – A village at the junction of Pennsylvania Route 49 and Pennsylvania Route 249 in the northeastern part of the township.
- Potter Brook – A village on Pennsylvania Route 49 in the western part of the township, near the Potter County line.
- Westfield – A borough in the north-central part of the township, at the junction of Pennsylvania Route 49 and Pennsylvania Route 349.
