= Middlebury Township, Pennsylvania =

Township in Pennsylvania, US

Coordinates: 41°52′00″N 77°16′59″W

- Township
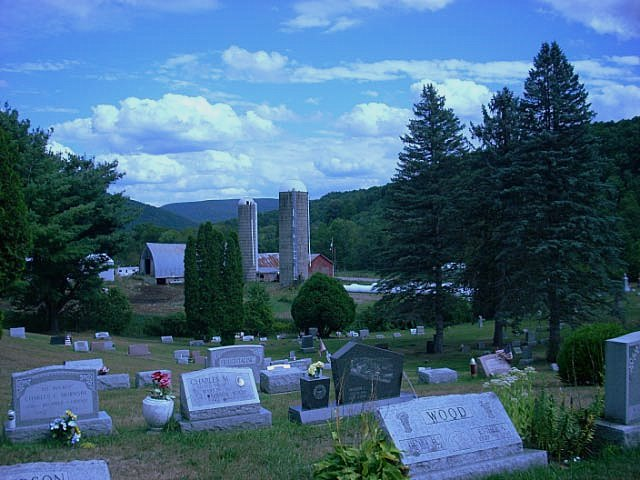
- Farm and cemetery in Middlebury Township

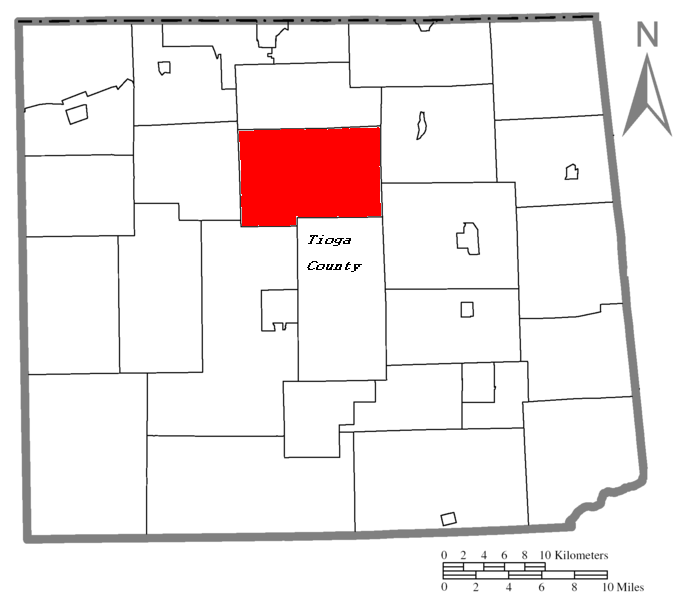
- Map of Tioga County Highlighting Middlebury Township

- Map of Pennsylvania highlighting Tioga County
- Country: United States
- State: Pennsylvania
- County: Tioga
- Settled: 1800
- Incorporated: 1822

Area
  - Total: 50.15 sq mi (129.90 km^{2})
  - Land: 49.81 sq mi (129.02 km^{2})
  - Water: 0.34 sq mi (0.88 km^{2})

Population (2020)
  - Total: 1,307 ▲
  - Estimate (2023): 1,296
  - Density: 26.3/sq mi (10.14/km^{2})
- Time zone: Eastern Time Zone (North America)
  - Summer (DST): EDT
- FIPS code: 42-117-48968

Historical population
Census	Pop.	Note	%±
2000	1,221		—
2010	1,285		5.2%
2020	1,307		1.7%
2023 (est.)	1,296		−0.8%
U.S. Decennial Census

Middlebury Township is a township in Tioga County, Pennsylvania, United States. The population was 1,307 at the 2020 census.

== Geography ==
According to the United States Census Bureau, the township has a total area of 48.8 square miles (126.3 km^{2}), of which 48.4 square miles (125.4 km^{2}) is land and 0.4 square mile (0.9 km^{2}) (0.74%) is water.

Middlebury Township is bordered by Farmington Township to the north, Tioga and Richmond Townships to the east, Charleston and Delmar Township to the south and Chatham Township to the west.

== Demographics ==
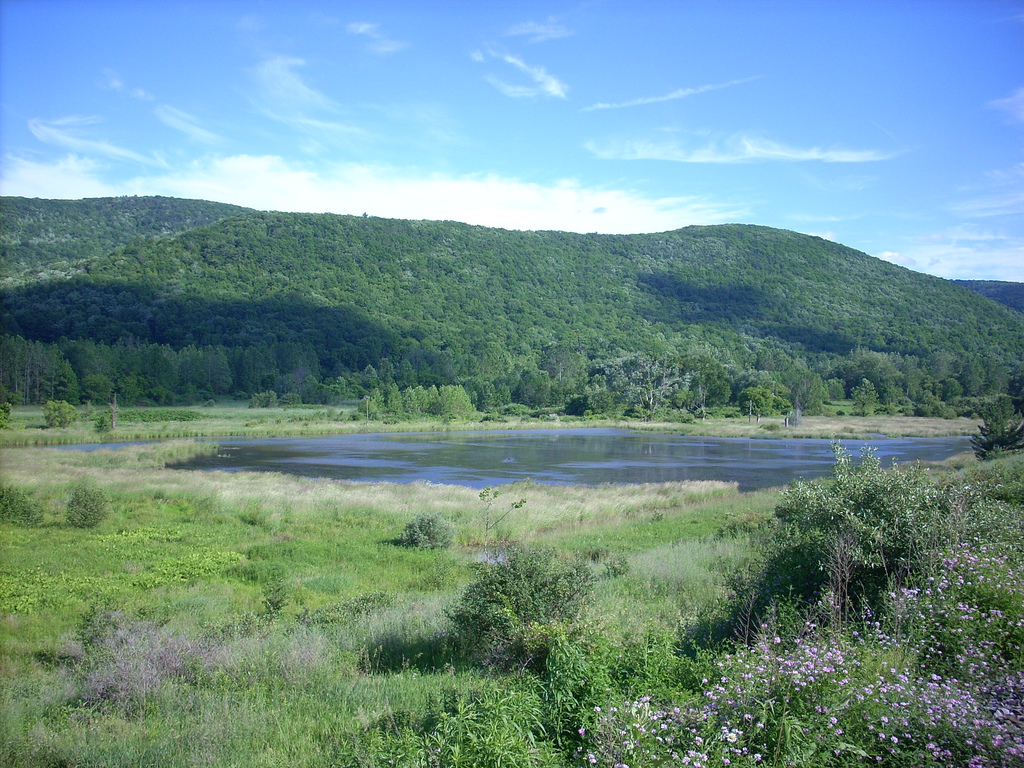
A wetland in Middlebury Township

As of the census of 2000, there were 1,221 people, 477 households, and 352 families residing in the township. The population density was 25.2 people per square mile (9.7/km^{2}). There were 606 housing units at an average density of 12.5/sq mi (4.8/km^{2}). The racial makeup of the township was 98.44% White, 0.08% Native American, 0.16% Asian, 0.90% from other races, and 0.41% from two or more races. Hispanic or Latino of any race were 0.82% of the population.

There were 477 households, out of which 33.3% had children under the age of 18 living with them, 62.7% were married couples living together, 6.9% had a female householder with no husband present, and 26.0% were non-families. 19.9% of all households were made up of individuals, and 8.8% had someone living alone who was 65 years of age or older. The average household size was 2.56 and the average family size was 2.95.

In the township the population was spread out, with 24.7% under the age of 18, 7.3% from 18 to 24, 28.4% from 25 to 44, 25.2% from 45 to 64, and 14.3% who were 65 years of age or older. The median age was 39 years. For every 100 females, there were 103.5 males. For every 100 females age 18 and over, there were 99.8 males.

The median income for a household in the township was $35,052, and the median income for a family was $40,662. Males had a median income of $26,800 versus $20,511 for females. The per capita income for the township was $17,390. About 7.9% of families and 12.7% of the population were below the poverty line, including 21.8% of those under age 18 and 5.1% of those age 65 or over.

== Communities and locations in Middlebury Township ==
- Crooked Creek – A village on Pennsylvania Route 287 in the eastern part of the township.
- Hammond – A village on Pennsylvania Route 287 in the northeastern part of the township, near Hammond Lake.
- Hammond Lake – A portion of Hammond Lake is located in northeastern Middlebury Township.
- Holiday – A village on Pennsylvania Route 287, just west of Crooked Creek.
- Keeneyville – A village on Pennsylvania Route 249 in the west-central part of the township.
- Locey Creek and Croft Hollow-
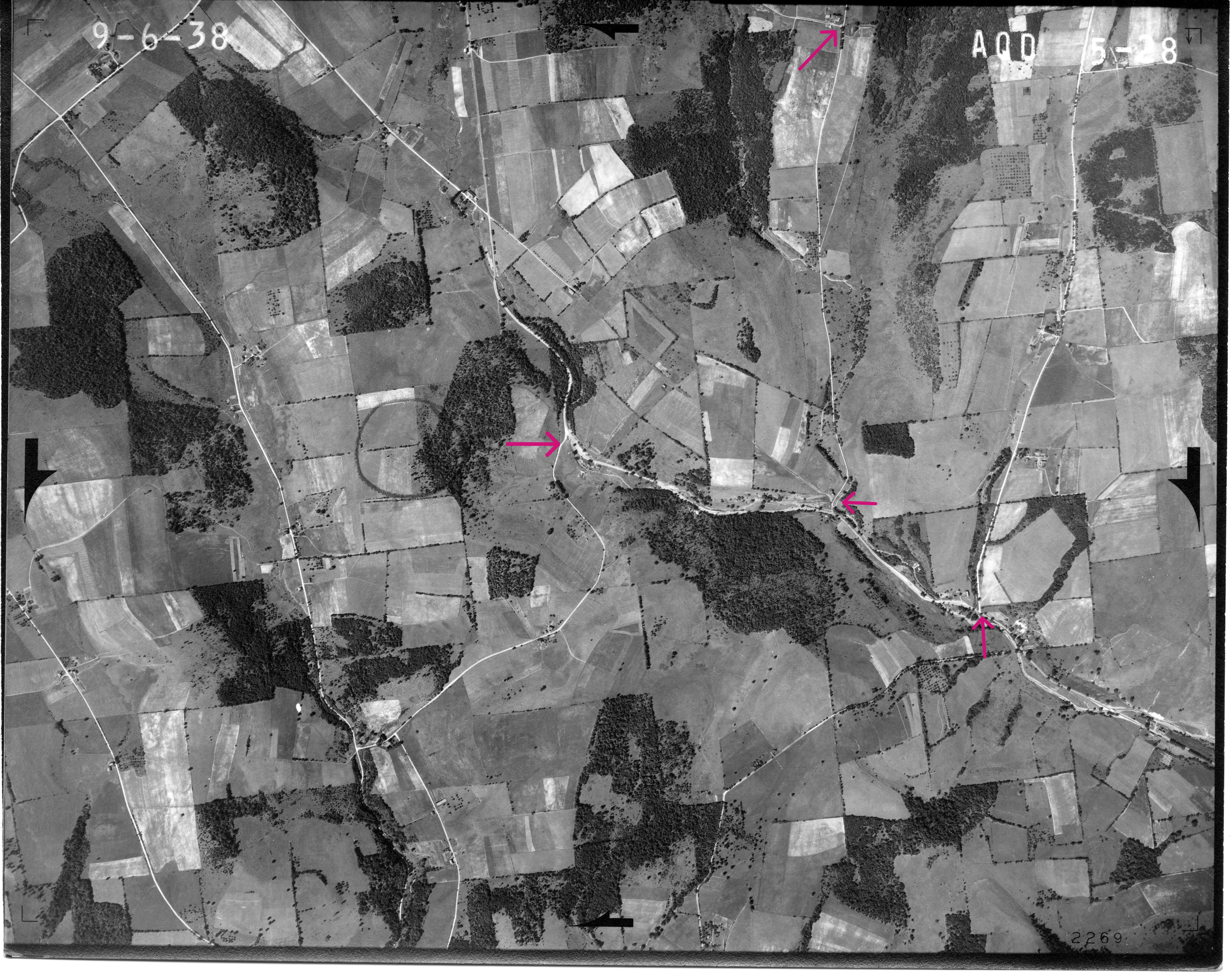
  Aerial view dated 1938: Left to right: Locey Creek Rd & Beehive. Locey Creek Rd. and Croft Hollow. Locey Creek Rd. and French Hill. Top: Croft Hollow and Johnson Roads
  Located north of Route 249 and Keeneyville, in Middlebury Township.
- Middlebury Center – A village at the junction of Pennsylvania Routes 249 and 287 in the south-central part of the township.
- Niles Valley – A village on Pennsylvania Route 287 near the southern township line.
- Shinglebury – A village in the northern part of the township.
- Tioga State Forest – Part of southwestern Middlebury Township is covered by the Tioga State Forest.

== Government ==
Middlebury Township is governed by three locally elected Township Supervisors.

County level

Three, elected at large, County Commissioners. In 2014, the Commissioners are: Roger C. Bunn, Mark L. Hamilton and Erick J. Coolidge.

State level

- Representative Clint Owlett, State Representative, Pennsylvania House of Representatives, District 68
- Senator Gene Yaw, Republican Senate District 23

Federal level

- Representative Glenn Thompson, Republican, Pennsylvania's 5th congressional district
- Senator David McCormick, Republican
- Senator John Fetterman, Democrat
