= Cowanesque, Pennsylvania =

Unincorporated community in Pennsylvania, US

- Unincorporated community
- Location within Pennsylvania
- Coordinates: 41°55′59″N 77°29′50″W
- Country: United States
- State: Pennsylvania
- County: Tioga
- Elevation: 1,306 ft (398 m)
- Time zone: UTC-5 (Eastern (EST))
  - Summer (DST): UTC-4 (EDT)
- Area code: 814
- GNIS feature ID: 1172548

Cowanesque is an unincorporated community in Tioga County, Pennsylvania, United States. The community is located along Pennsylvania Route 49, 2.4 miles (3.9 km) east-northeast of Westfield. Cowanesque had a post office from May 16, 1864, until June 16, 2007.
