= Clymer Township, Tioga County, Pennsylvania =

Township in Pennsylvania, US

Coordinates: 41°52′36″N 77°31′59″W

Clymer Township, Pennsylvania
- Township
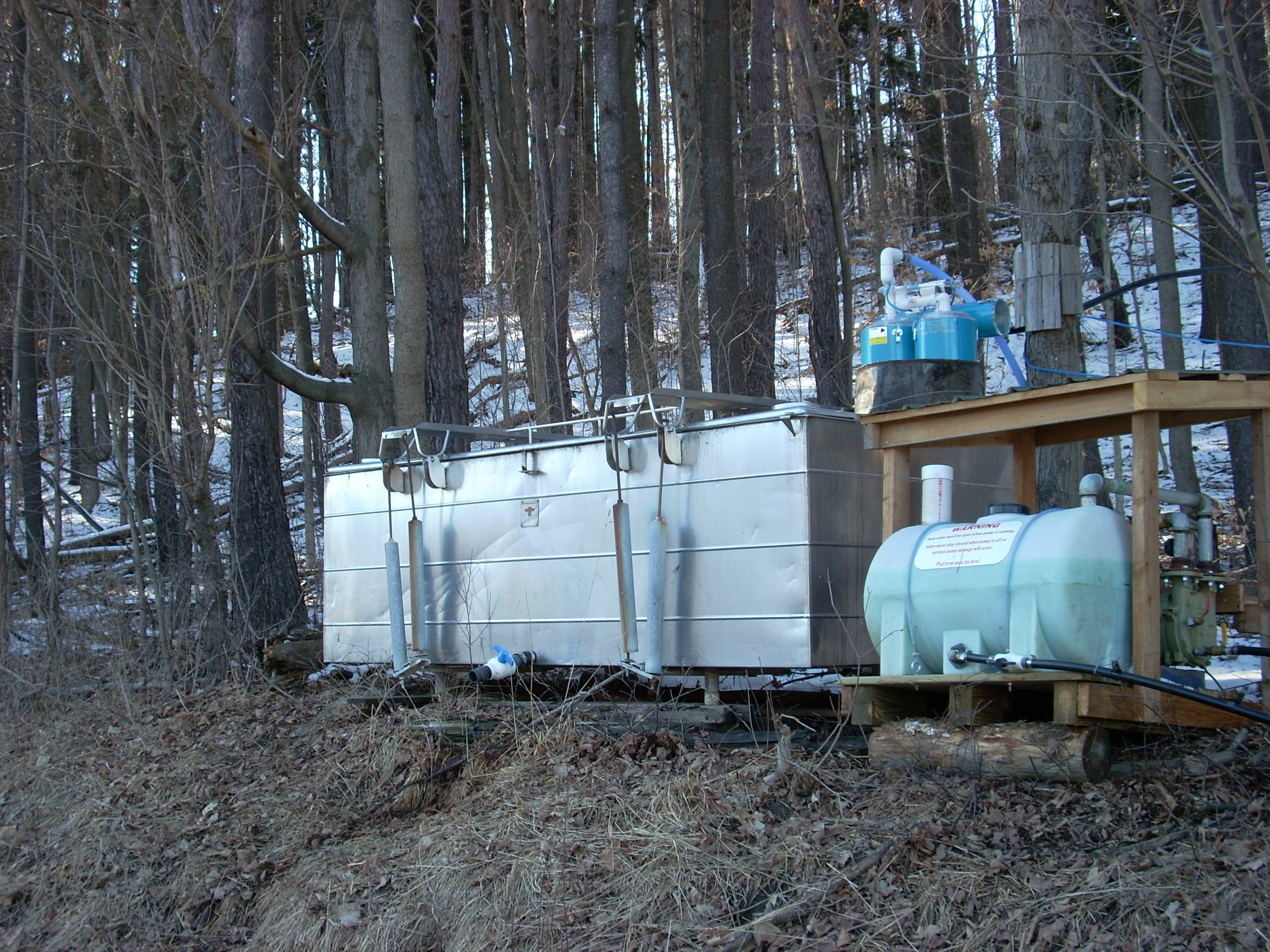
- Gathering sap from maple trees in Clymer Township

- Logo

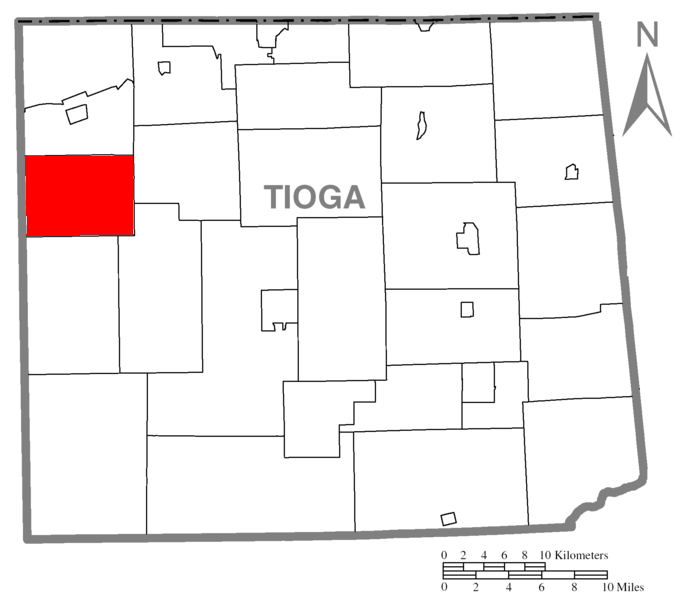
- Map of Tioga County Highlighting Clymer Township

- Map of Pennsylvania highlighting Tioga County
- Country: United States
- State: Pennsylvania
- County: Tioga
- Settled: 1815
- Incorporated: 1850

Area
  - Total: 34.27 sq mi (88.77 km^{2})
  - Land: 34.12 sq mi (88.36 km^{2})
  - Water: 0.16 sq mi (0.41 km^{2})

Population (2020)
  - Total: 622 ▲
  - Estimate (2023): 612
  - Density: 16.7/sq mi (6.45/km^{2})
- Time zone: Eastern Time Zone (North America)
  - Summer (DST): EDT
- FIPS code: 42-117-14528
- Website: www.clymertownship.net

Historical population
Census	Pop.	Note	%±
2000	597		—
2010	581		−2.7%
2020	622		7.1%
2023 (est.)	612		−1.6%
U.S. Decennial Census

Clymer Township is a township in Tioga County, Pennsylvania, United States. The population was 622 at the 2020 census.

== Geography ==
According to the United States Census Bureau, the township has a total area of 33.7 square miles (87 km^{2}), of which 33.5 square miles (87 km^{2}) is land and 0.2 square miles (0.52 km^{2}) (0.45%) is water.

=== Adjacent townships and areas ===
(Clockwise)

- Westfield Township
- Chatham Township; Shippen Township
- Gaines Township
- Pike Township; Hector Township

== Demographics ==
As of the census of 2000, there were 597 people, 235 households, and 175 families residing in the township. The population density was 17.8 people per square mile (6.9/km^{2}). There were 411 housing units at an average density of 12.3/sq mi (4.7/km^{2}). The racial makeup of the township was 99.33% White, 0.17% Native American, 0.17% Asian, and 0.34% from two or more races.

There were 235 households, out of which 25.5% had children under the age of 18 living with them, 66.0% were married couples living together, 6.4% had a female householder with no husband present, and 25.5% were non-families. 22.1% of all households were made up of individuals, and 10.2% had someone living alone who was 65 years of age or older. The average household size was 2.54 and the average family size was 2.94.

In the township the population was spread out, with 23.5% under the age of 18, 6.9% from 18 to 24, 22.8% from 25 to 44, 32.0% from 45 to 64, and 14.9% who were 65 years of age or older. The median age was 44 years. For every 100 females, there were 100.3 males. For every 100 females age 18 and over, there were 90.4 males.

The median income for a household in the township was $25,750, and the median income for a family was $28,889. Males had a median income of $26,250 versus $20,104 for females. The per capita income for the township was $12,280. About 21.2% of families and 27.3% of the population were below the poverty line, including 44.1% of those under age 18 and 20.2% of those age 65 or over.

== Communities and locations ==
- Azelta – A village in the eastern part of the township.
- Beechwood Lake – A small lake in the central part of the township, between Sabinsville and Azelta.
- Clymer – A village in the western part of the township, near the Potter County line.
- Davis – A village on Pennsylvania Route 349 in the southwestern part of the township.
- Sabinsville – A village on Pennsylvania Route 349 in the northern part of the township.
