= Chatham Township, Tioga County, Pennsylvania =

Township in Pennsylvania, US

Coordinates: 41°52′00″N 77°21′59″W

Chatham Township, Pennsylvania
- Township
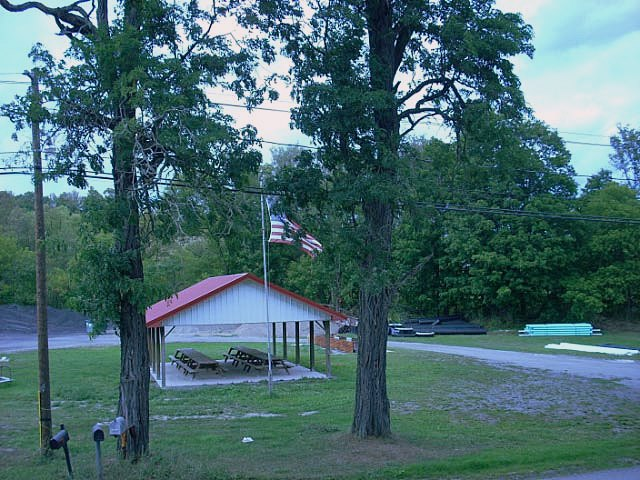
- Chatham Township municipal park

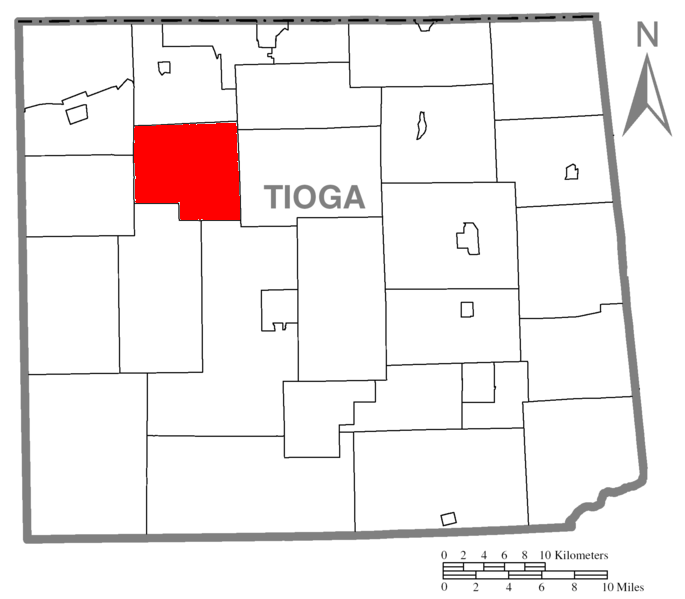
- Map of Tioga County Highlighting Chatham Township

- Map of Pennsylvania highlighting Tioga County
- Country: United States
- State: Pennsylvania
- County: Tioga
- Settled: 1818
- Incorporated: 1828

Area
  - Total: 35.32 sq mi (91.48 km^{2})
  - Land: 35.27 sq mi (91.36 km^{2})
  - Water: 0.046 sq mi (0.12 km^{2})

Population (2020)
  - Total: 609 ▲
  - Estimate (2023): 601
  - Density: 16.6/sq mi (6.39/km^{2})
- Time zone: Eastern Time Zone (North America)
  - Summer (DST): EDT
- FIPS code: 42-117-12880

Historical population
Census	Pop.	Note	%±
2000	587		—
2010	588		0.2%
2020	609		3.6%
2023 (est.)	601		−1.3%
U.S. Decennial Census

Chatham Township is a township in Tioga County, Pennsylvania, United States. The population was 609 at the 2020 census.

== Geography ==
According to the United States Census Bureau, the township has a total area of 35.0 square miles (91 km^{2}), of which 35.0 square miles (91 km^{2}) is land and 0.1 square miles (0.26 km^{2}) (0.14%) is water.

=== Adjacent townships and areas ===
(Clockwise)

- Deerfield Township
- Farmington Township; Middlebury Township
- Delmar Township; Shippen Township
- Clymer Township; Westfield Township

== Demographics ==
As of the census of 2000, there were 587 people, 232 households, and 176 families residing in the township. The population density was 16.8 people per square mile (6.5/km^{2}). There were 399 housing units at an average density of 11.4/sq mi (4.4/km^{2}). The racial makeup of the township was 98.30% White, 0.51% Native American, 0.34% Asian, 0.68% from other races, and 0.17% from two or more races. Hispanic or Latino of any race were 0.85% of the population.

There were 232 households, out of which 29.3% had children under the age of 18 living with them, 69.8% were married couples living together, 2.6% had a female householder with no husband present, and 24.1% were non-families. 20.7% of all households were made up of individuals, and 9.5% had someone living alone who was 65 years of age or older. The average household size was 2.53 and the average family size was 2.94.

In the township the population was spread out, with 22.3% under the age of 18, 6.3% from 18 to 24, 24.4% from 25 to 44, 32.4% from 45 to 64, and 14.7% who were 65 years of age or older. The median age was 43 years. For every 100 females, there were 111.9 males. For every 100 females age 18 and over, there were 113.1 males.

The median income for a household in the township was $35,089, and the median income for a family was $38,523. Males had a median income of $28,333 versus $16,705 for females. The per capita income for the township was $16,623. About 9.9% of families and 11.5% of the population were below the poverty line, including 9.2% of those under age 18 and 14.1% of those age 65 or over.

== Communities and locations in Chatham Township ==
- Little Marsh – A village on Pennsylvania Route 249 in the central part of the township.
- Shortsville – A village on Pennsylvania Route 249 in the eastern part of the township.
