= Gaines Township, Tioga County, Pennsylvania =

Township in Pennsylvania, US

Coordinates: 41°47′00″N 77°31′59″W

Gaines Township, Pennsylvania
- Township
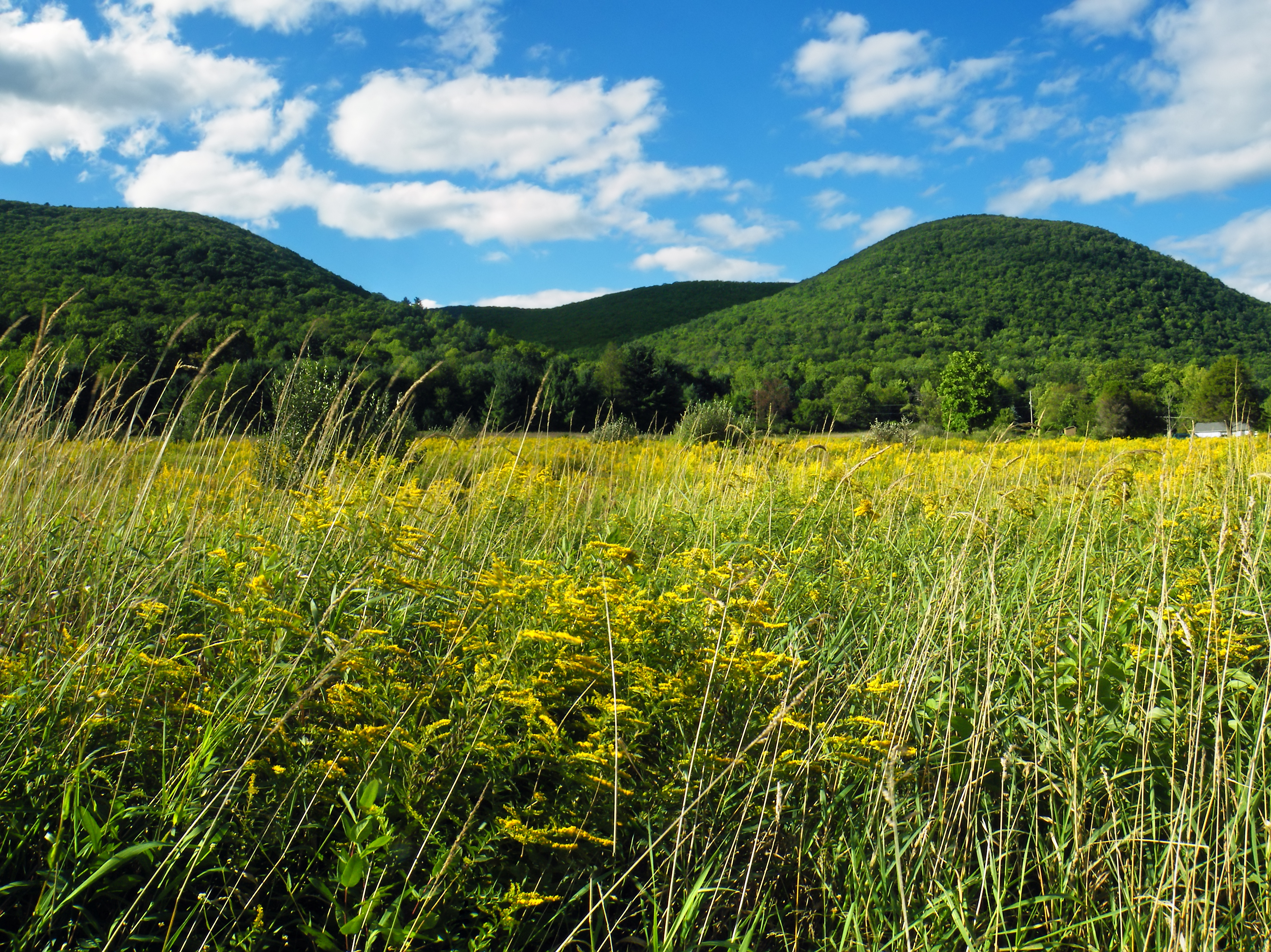
- Gaines Township in summer

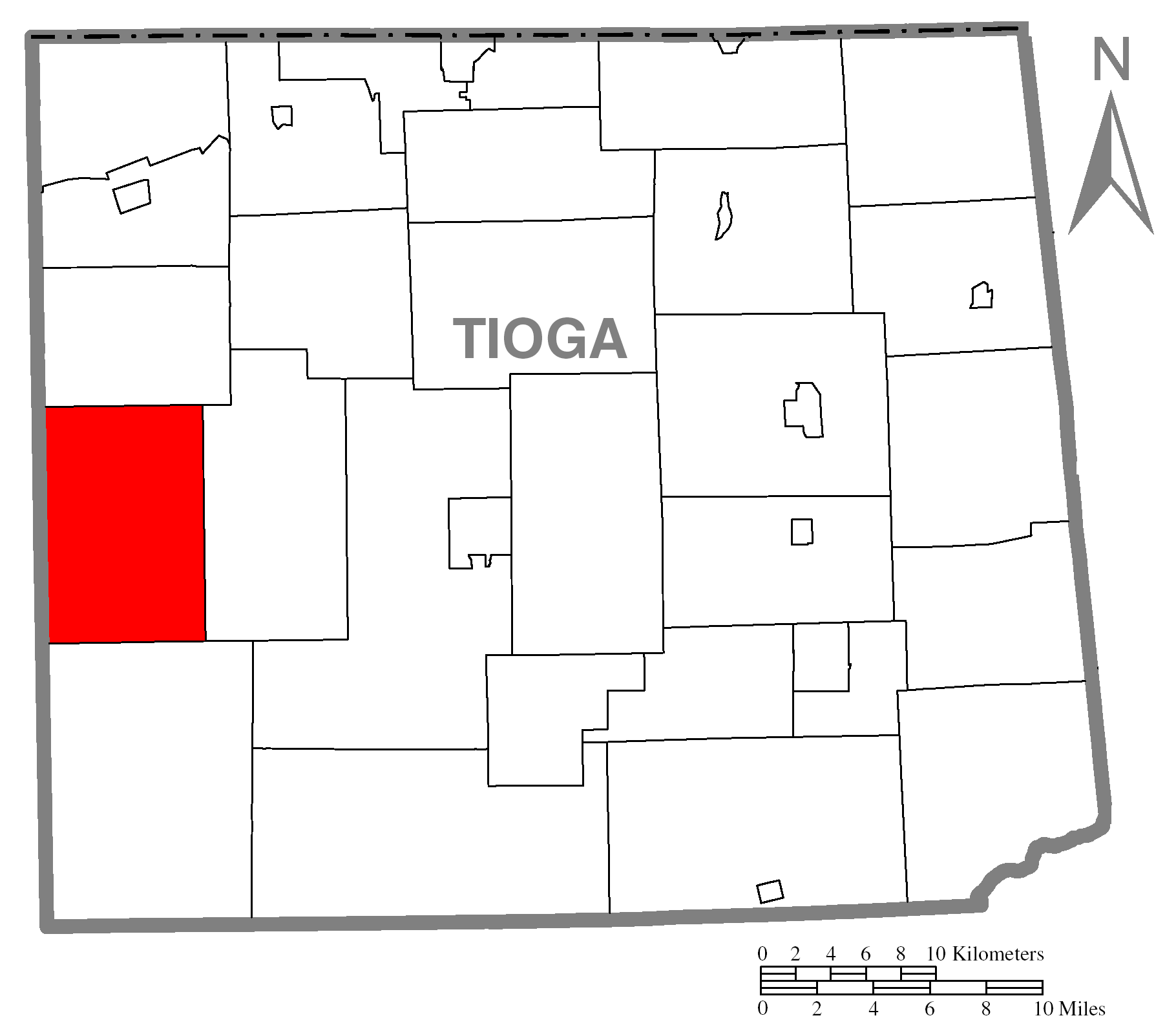
- Map of Tioga County Highlighting Gaines Township

- Map of Pennsylvania highlighting Tioga County
- Country: United States
- State: Pennsylvania
- County: Tioga
- Settled: 1804
- Incorporated: 1837

Area
  - Total: 48.62 sq mi (125.93 km^{2})
  - Land: 48.61 sq mi (125.90 km^{2})
  - Water: 0.012 sq mi (0.03 km^{2})

Population (2020)
  - Total: 609 ▲
  - Estimate (2023): 604
  - Density: 11.2/sq mi (4.32/km^{2})
- Time zone: Eastern Time Zone (North America)
  - Summer (DST): EDT
- FIPS code: 42-117-28264
- Website: https://gainestwp.com/

Historical population
Census	Pop.	Note	%±
2000	553		—
2010	542		−2.0%
2020	609		12.4%
2023 (est.)	604		−0.8%
U.S. Decennial Census

Gaines Township is a township in Tioga County, Pennsylvania, United States. The population was 609 at the 2020 census.

== Geography ==
According to the United States Census Bureau, the township has a total area of 48.7 square miles (126 km^{2}), of which 48.7 square miles (126 km^{2}) is land and 0.02% is water.

Gaines Township is bordered by Clymer Township to the north, Shippen Township to the east, Elk Township to the south and Potter County to the west.

== Demographics ==
As of the census of 2000, there were 553 people, 259 households, and 155 families residing in the township. The population density was 11.4 people per square mile (4.4/km^{2}). There were 752 housing units at an average density of 15.4/sq mi (6.0/km^{2}). The racial makeup of the township was 97.83% White, 0.54% African American, 0.54% Native American, and 1.08% from two or more races.

There were 259 households, out of which 23.2% had children under the age of 18 living with them, 47.1% were married couples living together, 11.6% had a female householder with no husband present, and 39.8% were non-families. 32.4% of all households were made up of individuals, and 15.8% had someone living alone who was 65 years of age or older. The average household size was 2.14 and the average family size was 2.69.

In the township the population was spread out, with 18.8% under the age of 18, 5.4% from 18 to 24, 21.0% from 25 to 44, 33.1% from 45 to 64, and 21.7% who were 65 years of age or older. The median age was 48 years. For every 100 females, there were 97.5 males. For every 100 females age 18 and over, there were 96.9 males.

The median income for a household in the township was $26,083, and the median income for a family was $31,528. Males had a median income of $30,500 versus $20,288 for females. The per capita income for the township was $16,105. About 9.0% of families and 13.3% of the population were below the poverty line, including 2.2% of those under age 18 and 6.6% of those age 65 or over.

== Communities and locations ==
- Gaines – A village in the central part of the township, at the junction of Pennsylvania Route 349 and U.S. Route 6.
- Gurnee – A village near the Tioga State Forest and the northern township line.
- Manhattan – A village just east of Gaines on U.S. Route 6.
- Marshlands – A village in the southwestern part of the township.
- Rexford – A village in the eastern part of the township on U.S. Route 6.
- Tioga State Forest – Much of eastern and northern Gaines Township is covered by the Tioga State Forest.
- Watrous – A village approximately two miles west of Gaines, just off U.S. Route 6.
