= Deerfield Township, Tioga County, Pennsylvania =

Township in Pennsylvania, US

Coordinates: 41°57′00″N 77°24′59″W

- Township
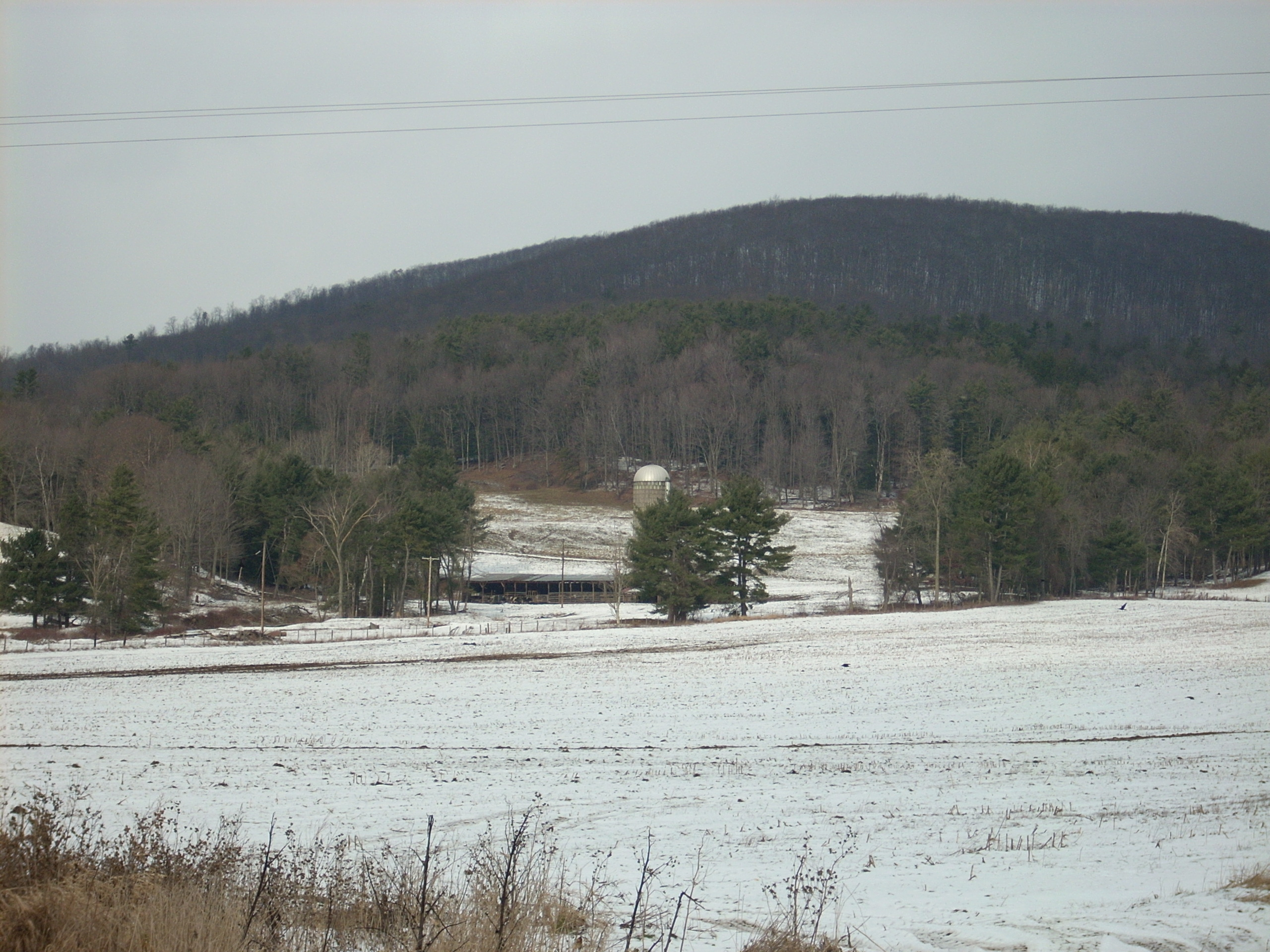
- A farm just off Pennsylvania Route 49 in Deerfield Township

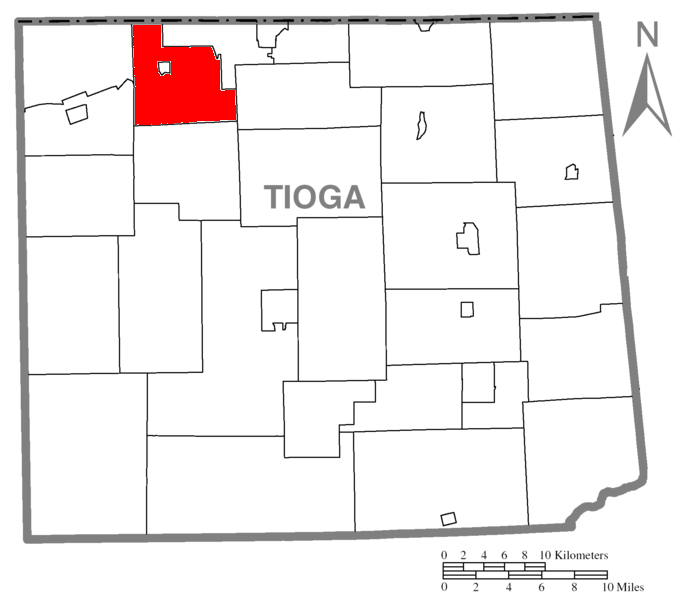
- Map of Tioga County Highlighting Deerfield Township

- Map of Pennsylvania highlighting Tioga County
- Country: United States
- State: Pennsylvania
- County: Tioga
- Settled: 1785
- Formed: 1814

Area
  - Total: 28.83 sq mi (74.68 km^{2})
  - Land: 28.83 sq mi (74.68 km^{2})
  - Water: 0 sq mi (0.00 km^{2})

Population (2020)
  - Total: 542 ▼
  - Estimate (2023): 537
  - Density: 23.0/sq mi (8.88/km^{2})
- Time zone: Eastern Time Zone (North America)
  - Summer (DST): EDT
- FIPS code: 42-117-18552

Historical population
Census	Pop.	Note	%±
2000	659		—
2010	662		0.5%
2020	542		−18.1%
2023 (est.)	537		−0.9%
U.S. Decennial Census

Deerfield Township is a township in Tioga County, Pennsylvania, United States. The population was 542 at the 2020 census.

== Geography ==
According to the United States Census Bureau, the township has a total area of 29.4 square miles (76 km^{2}), all land.

=== Adjacent townships and areas ===
(Clockwise)

- Troupsburg, Steuben County, New York; Woodhull, Steuben County, New York
- Osceola Township; Farmington Township
- Chatham Township
- Westfield Township; Brookfield Township

== Demographics ==
As of the census of 2000, there were 659 people, 242 households, and 186 families residing in the township. The population density was 22.4 people per square mile (8.7/km^{2}). There were 283 housing units at an average density of 9.6/sq mi (3.7/km^{2}). The racial makeup of the township was 98.94% White, 0.61% African American, and 0.46% from two or more races. Hispanic or Latino of any race were 0.61% of the population.

There were 242 households, out of which 34.3% had children under the age of 18 living with them, 62.4% were married couples living together, 8.3% had a female householder with no husband present, and 23.1% were non-families. 19.4% of all households were made up of individuals, and 7.9% had someone living alone who was 65 years of age or older. The average household size was 2.71 and the average family size was 3.06.

In the township the population was spread out, with 28.4% under the age of 18, 5.6% from 18 to 24, 26.6% from 25 to 44, 24.6% from 45 to 64, and 14.9% who were 65 years of age or older. The median age was 38 years. For every 100 females, there were 98.5 males. For every 100 females age 18 and over, there were 92.7 males.

The median income for a household in the township was $34,688, and the median income for a family was $38,846. Males had a median income of $28,958 versus $22,188 for females. The per capita income for the township was $14,354. About 10.4% of families and 15.0% of the population were below the poverty line, including 27.0% of those under age 18 and 12.7% of those age 65 or over.

== Communities and locations in Deerfield Township ==
- Academy Corners – A village in the central part of the township about a mile east of Knoxville, located on Pennsylvania Route 49.
- Knoxville – A small borough located near the junction of Pennsylvania Route 249 and Pennsylvania Route 49.
