= Brookfield Township, Pennsylvania =

Township in Pennsylvania, US

Coordinates: 41°58′00″N 77°32′59″W

- Township
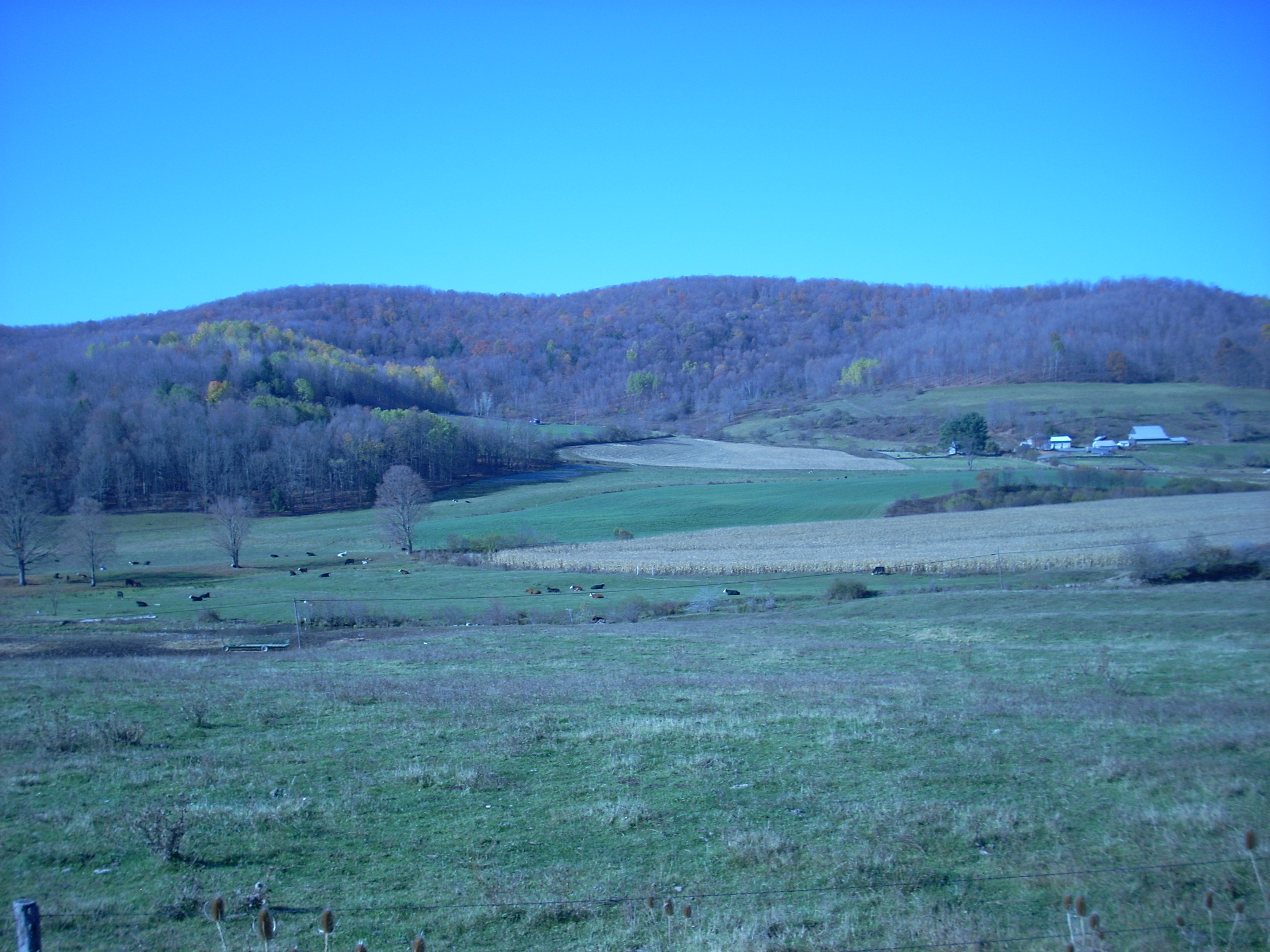
- Brookfield Township

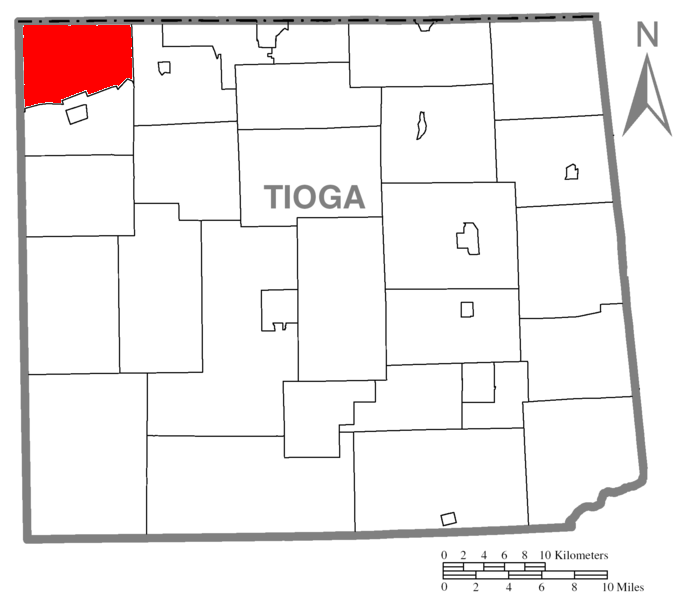
- Map of Tioga County Highlighting Brookfield Township

- Map of Pennsylvania highlighting Tioga County
- Country: United States
- State: Pennsylvania
- County: Tioga
- Settled: 1809
- Incorporated: 1827

Area
  - Total: 31.88 sq mi (82.56 km^{2})
  - Land: 31.88 sq mi (82.56 km^{2})
  - Water: 0 sq mi (0.00 km^{2})

Population (2020)
  - Total: 371 ▼
  - Estimate (2023): 365
  - Density: 12.8/sq mi (4.95/km^{2})
- Time zone: Eastern Time Zone (North America)
  - Summer (DST): EDT
- FIPS code: 42-117-09072

Historical population
Census	Pop.	Note	%±
2000	443		—
2010	421		−5.0%
2020	371		−11.9%
2023 (est.)	365		−1.6%
U.S. Decennial Census

Brookfield Township is a township in Tioga County, Pennsylvania, United States. The population was 371 at the 2020 census.

== Geography ==
According to the United States Census Bureau, the township has a total area of 31.8 square miles (82 km^{2}), all land.

Brookfield Township is bordered by the Town of Troupsburg, Steuben County, New York to the north, Deerfield Township to the east, Westfield Township to the south and Harrison Township in Potter County to the west.

== Demographics ==
At the 2000 census there were 443 people, 171 households, and 132 families residing in the township. The population density was 13.9 per square mile (5.4/km^{2}). There were 247 housing units at an average density of 7.8 per square mile (3.0/km^{2}). The racial make-up of the township was 99.10% White and 0.90% from two or more races. Hispanic or Latino of any race were 0.90% of the population.

There were 171 households, of which 27.5% had children under the age of 18 living with them, 67.8% were married couples living together, 5.8% had a female householder with no husband present and 22.8% were non-families. 19.3% of all households were made up of individuals and 6.4% had someone living alone who was 65 years of age or older. The average household size was 2.59 and the average family size was 2.98.

23.0% of the population were under the age of 18, 7.4% from 18 to 24, 25.5% from 25 to 44, 28.2% from 45 to 64 and 15.8% were 65 years of age or older. The median age was 42 years. For every 100 females, there were 112.0 males. For every 100 females age 18 and over, there were 101.8 males.

The median household income was $34,318 and the median family income was $36,250. Males had a median income of $28,750 and females $20,938. The per capita income was $14,673. About 11.8% of families and 15.2% of the population were below the poverty line, including 24.0% of those under age 18 and 15.5% of those age 65 or over.

== Communities and locations in Brookfield Township ==
- Austinburg – A village in the northeastern part of the township on Pennsylvania Route 249.
- Brookfield – A village in the northwestern part of the township near the New York state line.
- Sylvester – A village in the central part of the township.
