= Sabinsville, Pennsylvania =

Unincorporated community in Pennsylvania, US

Coordinates: 41°52′04″N 77°31′31″W

- Unincorporated community
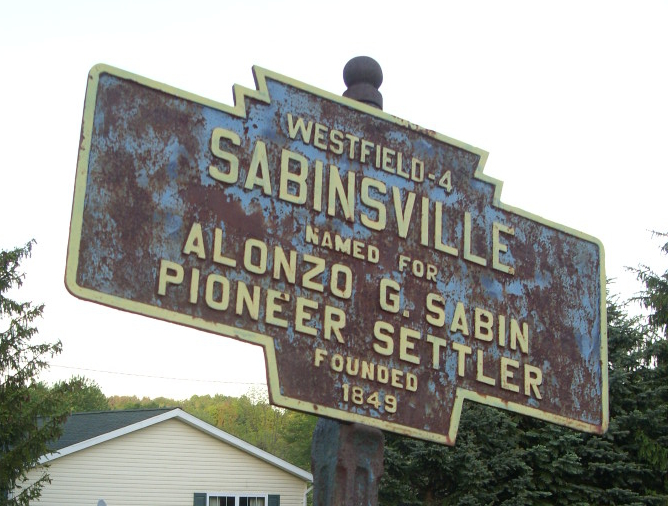
- Keystone marker
- Nickname: Cathead
- Interactive map of Sabinsville, Pennsylvania
- Country: United States
- State: Pennsylvania
- County: Tioga
- Time zone: UTC-5 (Eastern (EST))
  - Summer (DST): UTC-4 (EDT)
- ZIP Code: 16943
- Area code: 814

Sabinsville is an unincorporated community, located in Clymer Township, in Tioga County, Pennsylvania, United States. The zipcode is: 16943.

== Demographics ==
Historical population
Census	Pop.	Note	%±

The United States Census Bureau defined Sabinsville as a census designated place (CDP) in 2023.
