= Knoxville, Pennsylvania =

Borough in Pennsylvania, US

- Borough
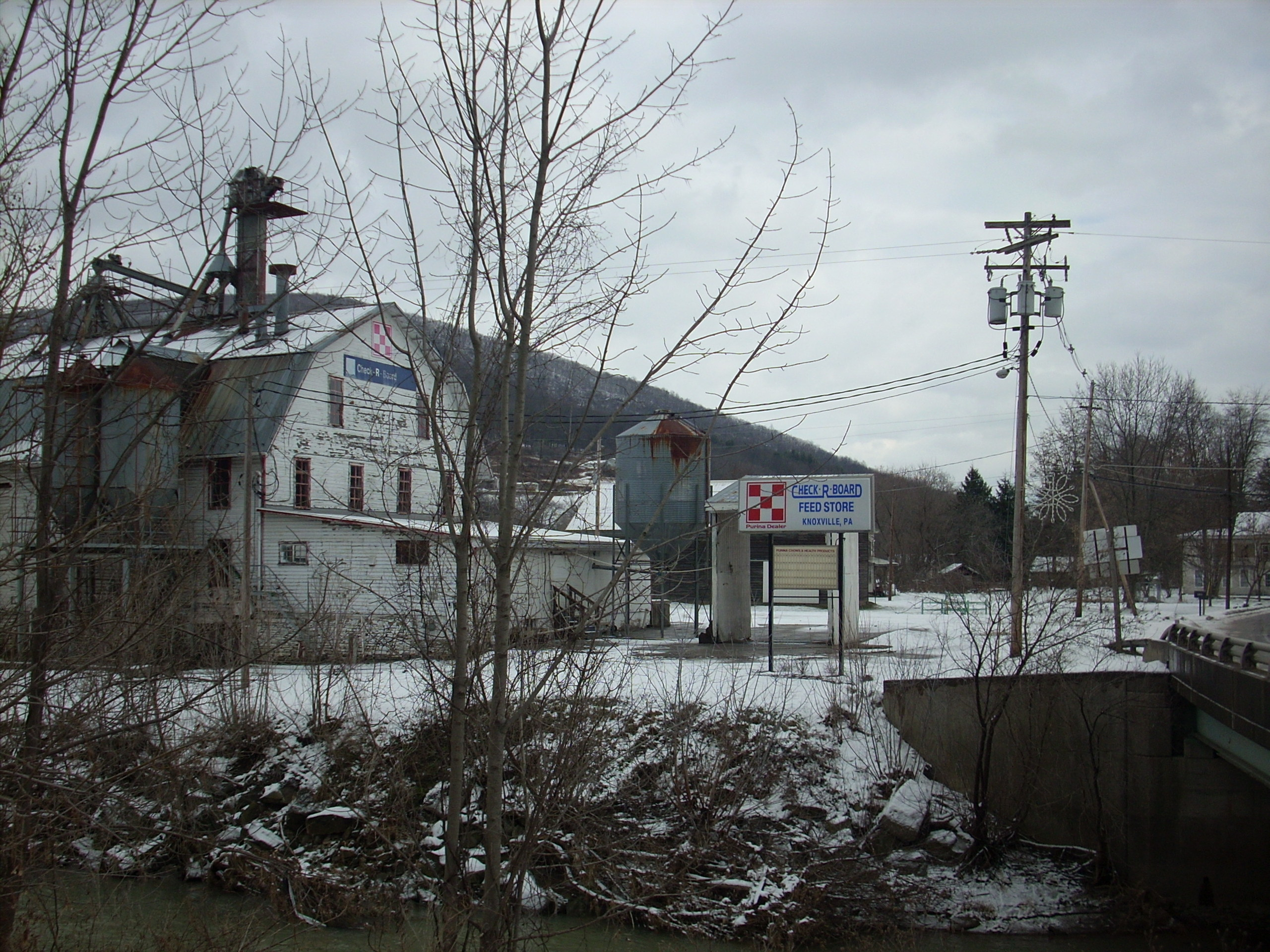
- The former Purina Mill and feed store on the western edge of Knoxville, January 2008

- Location of Knoxville in Tioga County, Pennsylvania.

- Location within the U.S. state of Pennsylvania Knoxville (the United States)
- Coordinates: 41°57′25″N 77°26′14″W
- Country: United States
- State: Pennsylvania
- County: Tioga
- Settled: 1835
- Incorporated (borough): 1851

Area
  - Total: 0.62 sq mi (1.61 km^{2})
  - Land: 0.62 sq mi (1.61 km^{2})
  - Water: 0 sq mi (0.00 km^{2})
- Elevation: 1,240 ft (380 m)

Population (2020)
  - Total: 680
  - Density: 1,096.2/sq mi (423.26/km^{2})
- Time zone: Eastern (EST)
  - Summer (DST): EDT
- ZIP code: 16928
- Area code: 814
- FIPS code: 42-40360

Knoxville is a borough in northwestern Tioga County, Pennsylvania, United States. The population was 682 at the time of the 2020 census.

== History ==
The land on which the town of Knoxville, Pennsylvania would be created was situated in Deerfield Township, Tioga County, Pennsylvania. The town was laid out and settled in 1835, and was officially incorporated as a borough in May 1851.

In 1899, the borough had four churches: Deerfield Baptist, First Methodist, Union Church, and a Presbyterian church. Among the businesses operating that year were bakeries, barbershops, a bicycle store, multiple blacksmith operations, a book and stationery store, bootmakers and shoemakers, a brick, lime and cement manufacturer, a bridge builder, a building mover, multiple independent carpenters, a carpet weaver and carpet sellers, two carriage, sleigh and wagonmakers, a clothing store, two coal dealers, a confectioner, two crockery stores, nine dressmakers, one drug store, two dry goods stores, two express agents, three furniture stores, two general merchandise stores, one grain dealer, one grist mill, three grocers, two hardware stores, two harnessmakers, three hotels, three insurance agents, two jewelers, a laundry, two lawyers, one livestock breeder and one poultry retailer, one livery, sale and horse boarding stable, one marble and granite plant, one mason, one music teacher, one newspaper, one nickel plating operation, one optician, four painters and paper hangers, two paint and oil artists, four physicians, two plumbers, one printer, two produce dealers, two railroad agents, one restaurant, one roofer, one sash door and blind retailer, one sawmill, two sewing machine retailers, one stove and tinware retailer, one surveyor, one telegraph agent, eight tobacco growers, two undertakers, and one wallpaper hanger.

== Geography ==
Knoxville is located at 41°57′26″N 77°26′19″W (41.957247, -77.438498).

According to the United States Census Bureau, the borough has a total area of 0.5 square miles (1.3 km^{2}), all of it land.

Historical population
Census	Pop.	Note	%±
1860	313		—
1870	400		27.8%
1880	459		14.8%
1890	679		47.9%
1900	862		27.0%
1910	840		−2.6%
1920	696		−17.1%
1930	608		−12.6%
1940	664		9.2%
1950	656		−1.2%
1960	694		5.8%
1970	698		0.6%
1980	650		−6.9%
1990	589		−9.4%
2000	617		4.8%
2010	629		1.9%
2020	682		8.4%
2021 (est.)	677		−0.7%

== Demographics ==
As of the census of 2000, there were 617 people, 242 households, and 166 families residing in the borough.

The population density was 1,348.8 inhabitants per square mile (520.8/km^{2}). There were 273 housing units at an average density of 596.8 per square mile (230.4/km^{2}).

The racial makeup of the borough was 99.68% White, 0.16% Native American, and 0.16% from two or more races. Hispanic or Latino of any race were 0.32% of the population.

There were 242 households, out of which 28.9% had children under the age of eighteen living with them; 52.5% were married couples living together, 10.7% had a female householder with no husband present, and 31.0% were non-families. 26.0% of all households were made up of individuals, and 12.4% had someone living alone who was sixty-five years of age or older.

The average household size was 2.55 and the average family size was 3.00.

In the borough the population was spread out, with 25.6% under the age of eighteen, 9.2% from eighteen to twenty-four, 24.3% from twenty-five to forty-four, 21.9% from forty-five to sixty-four, and 19.0% who were sixty-five years of age or older. The median age was thirty-six years.

For every one hundred females there were 100.3 males. For every one hundred females who were aged eighteen and over, there were 92.1 males.

The median income for a household in the borough was $30,000, and the median income for a family was $37,188. Males had a median income of $29,196 compared with that of $19,375 for females.

The per capita income for the borough was $15,605.

Roughly 5.6% of families and 8.9% of the population were living below the poverty line, including 10.2% of those who were under the age of eighteen and 6.9% of those who were aged sixty-five or over.

== Education ==
It is in the Northern Tioga School District.

== See also ==
- List of towns and boroughs in Pennsylvania
