= Tioga County, Pennsylvania =

County in Pennsylvania, United States

- County
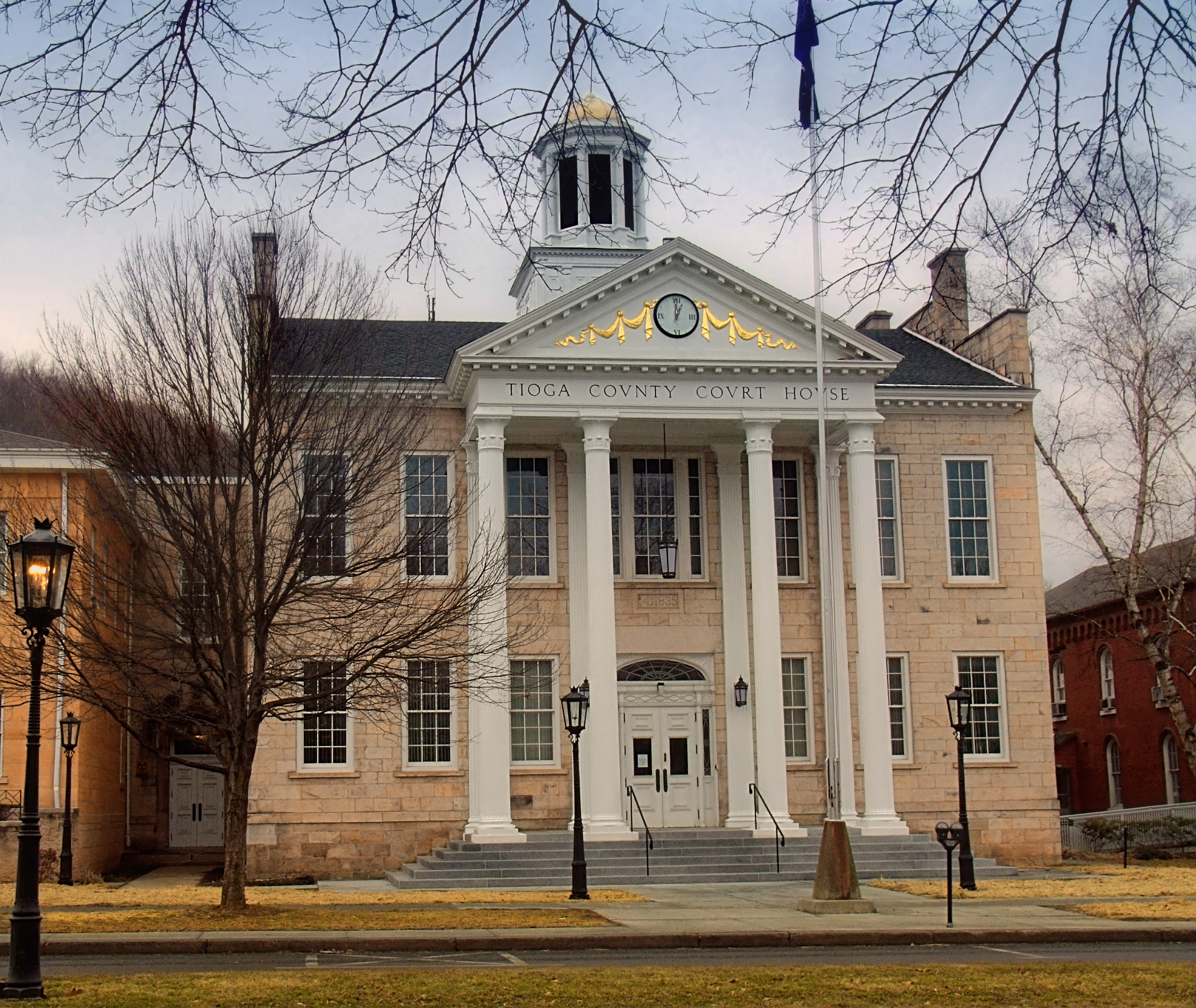
- Tioga County Courthouse in 2011

- Seal

- Location within the U.S. state of Pennsylvania
- Coordinates: 41°46′N 77°15′W
- Country: United States
- State: Pennsylvania
- Founded: October 13, 1812
- Named for: Tioga River
- Seat: Wellsboro
- Largest borough: Mansfield

Area
  - Total: 1,137 sq mi (2,940 km^{2})
  - Land: 1,134 sq mi (2,940 km^{2})
  - Water: 3.2 sq mi (8.3 km^{2}) 0.3%

Population (2020)
  - Total: 41,045
  - Estimate (2025): 40,502 ▼
  - Density: 36/sq mi (14/km^{2})
- Time zone: UTC−5 (Eastern)
  - Summer (DST): UTC−4 (EDT)
- Congressional district: 15th
- Website: www.tiogacountypa.us

Tioga County is a county in the Commonwealth of Pennsylvania. As of the 2020 census, the population was 41,045. Its county seat is Wellsboro. The county was created on March 26, 1804, from part of Lycoming County and later organized in 1812. It is named for the Tioga River. The county is part of the North Central Pennsylvania region of the state. (Note: Includes Clearfield, Jefferson, Tioga, McKean, Warren, Clarion, Elk, Potter, Forest and Cameron Counties)

== History ==
The county was colonized by people of Yankee stock (colonists from New England and the western part of New York who were descended from the English Puritans of colonial New England). With the opening of a rough wagon road to the source of the Tioga River, New England colonists poured over the Allegheny Mountains. Tioga County resembled upstate New York more than it did eastern Pennsylvania, as its population primarily consisted of colonists from New England. Developers and land speculators laid out roads, established post routes, erected public buildings, and invited people to move there. The original colonists were entirely of New England origins or were Yankees from upstate New York, whose families had recent ancestors in New England, with colonization taking place in the aftermath of the Revolutionary War. Tioga County was largely culturally contiguous with New England culture, which was influential across the Northern Tier of the United States through its migrants.

In the late 19th and early 20th centuries, the county received immigrants from Ireland, Germany and eastern Europe, who came to work in the coal mines. A number of them were Roman Catholic, introducing more religious diversity to the area.

== Geography ==
According to the U.S. Census Bureau, the county has a total area of 1,137 square miles (2,940 km^{2}), of which 1,134 square miles (2,940 km^{2}) is land and 3.2 square miles (8.3 km^{2}) (0.3%) is water. It is the fourth-largest county in Pennsylvania by land area and fifth-largest by total area. It has a warm-summer humid continental climate (Dfb) and average monthly temperatures in Wellsboro range from 22.8 °F in January to 68.2 °F in July.

=== Adjacent counties ===
- Steuben County, New York (north)
- Chemung County, New York (northeast)
- Bradford County (east)
- Lycoming County (south)
- Potter County (west)

== Demographics ==
Historical population
Census	Pop.	Note	%±
1810	1,687		—
1820	4,021		138.4%
1830	8,978		123.3%
1840	15,498		72.6%
1850	23,987		54.8%
1860	31,044		29.4%
1870	35,097		13.1%
1880	45,814		30.5%
1890	52,313		14.2%
1900	49,086		−6.2%
1910	42,829		−12.7%
1920	37,118		−13.3%
1930	31,871		−14.1%
1940	35,004		9.8%
1950	35,474		1.3%
1960	36,614		3.2%
1970	39,691		8.4%
1980	40,973		3.2%
1990	41,126		0.4%
2000	41,372		0.6%
2010	41,981		1.5%
2020	41,045		−2.2%
2025 (est.)	40,502	▼	−1.3%
U.S. Decennial Census; 1790–1960 1900–1990; 1990–2000 2010–2017 2010-2020

=== Racial and ethnic composition ===
Tioga County, Pennsylvania – Racial and ethnic composition Note: the US Census treats Hispanic/Latino as an ethnic category. This table excludes Latinos from the racial categories and assigns them to a separate category. Hispanics/Latinos may be of any race.
Race / Ethnicity (NH = Non-Hispanic)	Pop 1980	Pop 1990	Pop 2000	Pop 2010	Pop 2020	% 1980	% 1990	% 2000	% 2010	% 2020
White alone (NH)	40,521	40,553	40,452	40,560	38,257	98.90%	98.61%	97.77%	96.62%	93.21%
Black or African American alone (NH)	174	212	243	322	321	0.42%	0.52%	0.59%	0.77%	0.78%
Native American or Alaska Native alone (NH)	27	106	91	81	73	0.07%	0.26%	0.22%	0.19%	0.18%
Asian alone (NH)	51	105	124	181	189	0.12%	0.26%	0.30%	0.43%	0.46%
Native Hawaiian or Pacific Islander alone (NH)	x	x	3	4	7	x	x	0.01%	0.01%	0.02%
Other race alone (NH)	38	11	19	10	99	0.09%	0.03%	0.05%	0.02%	0.24%
Mixed race or Multiracial (NH)	x	x	227	386	1,459	x	x	0.55%	0.92%	3.55%
Hispanic or Latino (any race)	162	139	214	437	640	0.40%	0.34%	0.52%	1.04%	1.56%
Total	40,973	41,126	41,373	41,981	41,045	100.00%	100.00%	100.00%	100.00%	100.00%

=== 2020 census ===
As of the 2020 census, the county had a population of 41,045. The median age was 44.7 years, 20.3% of residents were under the age of 18, and 22.7% were 65 years of age or older. For every 100 females there were 99.2 males, and for every 100 females age 18 and over there were 96.6 males age 18 and over.

The racial makeup of the county was 93.7% White, 0.8% Black or African American, 0.2% American Indian and Alaska Native, 0.5% Asian, <0.1% Native Hawaiian and Pacific Islander, 0.5% from some other race, and 4.2% from two or more races. Hispanic or Latino residents of any race comprised 1.6% of the population.

<0.1% of residents lived in urban areas, while 100.0% lived in rural areas.

There were 16,964 households in the county, of which 26.1% had children under the age of 18 living in them. Of all households, 50.0% were married-couple households, 18.8% were households with a male householder and no spouse or partner present, and 22.9% were households with a female householder and no spouse or partner present. About 28.4% of all households were made up of individuals and 14.2% had someone living alone who was 65 years of age or older.

There were 21,503 housing units, of which 21.1% were vacant. Among occupied housing units, 73.2% were owner-occupied and 26.8% were renter-occupied. The homeowner vacancy rate was 1.9% and the rental vacancy rate was 8.9%.

=== 2000 census ===
As of the census of 2000, there were 41,373 people, 15,925 households, and 11,195 families residing in the county. The population density was 36 people per square mile (14 people/km^{2}). There were 19,893 housing units at an average density of 18 units per square mile (6.9/km^{2}). The racial makeup of the county was 98.11% White, 0.60% Black or African American, 0.23% Native American, 0.30% Asian, 0.01% Pacific Islander, 0.14% from other races, and 0.61% from two or more races. 0.52% of the population were Hispanic or Latino of any race. Residents of Tioga County were of 31.9% English, 23.1% German, 10.1% Irish, 6.0% Polish and 5.3% Italian ancestry.

There were 15,925 households, out of which 30.40% had children under the age of 18 living with them, 57.80% were married couples living together, 8.60% had a female householder with no husband present, and 29.70% were non-families. 24.40% of all households were made up of individuals, and 11.30% had someone living alone who was 65 years of age or older. The average household size was 2.48 and the average family size was 2.93.

In the county, the population was spread out, with 23.70% under the age of 18, 10.60% from 18 to 24, 25.40% from 25 to 44, 24.20% from 45 to 64, and 16.00% who were 65 years of age or older. The median age was 38 years. For every 100 females there were 95.90 males. For every 100 females age 18 and over, there were 92.80 males.

== Politics and government ==
United States presidential election results for Tioga County, Pennsylvania
Year	Republican		Democratic		Third party(ies)	
Year	No.	%	No.	%	No.	%
1888	7,808	69.23%	2,972	26.35%	499	4.42%
1892	6,706	64.77%	2,921	28.21%	726	7.01%
1896	7,922	71.42%	2,828	25.50%	342	3.08%
1900	7,458	71.02%	2,638	25.12%	406	3.87%
1904	7,410	79.32%	1,541	16.50%	391	4.19%
1908	6,947	71.28%	2,321	23.81%	478	4.90%
1912	1,895	22.40%	1,901	22.48%	4,662	55.12%
1916	5,347	66.41%	2,294	28.49%	411	5.10%
1920	9,718	83.28%	1,258	10.78%	693	5.94%
1924	8,452	81.22%	1,271	12.21%	683	6.56%
1928	11,774	87.23%	1,688	12.51%	36	0.27%
1932	9,583	75.00%	3,004	23.51%	191	1.49%
1936	12,567	69.40%	5,442	30.05%	99	0.55%
1940	11,645	72.23%	4,434	27.50%	43	0.27%
1944	10,381	75.73%	3,248	23.69%	79	0.58%
1948	10,016	77.03%	2,986	22.97%	0	0.00%
1952	11,203	78.65%	3,006	21.10%	35	0.25%
1956	10,827	76.72%	3,280	23.24%	6	0.04%
1960	11,082	73.04%	4,076	26.86%	15	0.10%
1964	7,064	48.73%	7,415	51.16%	16	0.11%
1968	9,298	67.07%	3,488	25.16%	1,077	7.77%
1972	10,028	72.05%	3,733	26.82%	157	1.13%
1976	8,417	58.43%	5,795	40.23%	193	1.34%
1980	8,770	63.33%	4,273	30.85%	806	5.82%
1984	10,532	71.92%	4,060	27.72%	52	0.36%
1988	9,471	66.00%	4,807	33.50%	72	0.50%
1992	7,823	47.29%	4,868	29.43%	3,852	23.28%
1996	7,382	51.18%	4,961	34.39%	2,082	14.43%
2000	9,635	65.22%	4,617	31.26%	520	3.52%
2004	12,019	68.40%	5,437	30.94%	115	0.65%
2008	11,326	62.48%	6,390	35.25%	410	2.26%
2012	11,342	66.35%	5,357	31.34%	395	2.31%
2016	13,614	73.56%	3,901	21.08%	992	5.36%
2020	15,742	74.51%	4,955	23.45%	429	2.03%
2024	16,272	75.17%	5,100	23.56%	274	1.27%

United States Senate election results for Tioga County, Pennsylvania1
Year	Republican		Democratic		Third party(ies)	
Year	No.	%	No.	%	No.	%
1994	8,252	68.56%	3,461	28.75%	324	2.69%
2000	10,194	70.68%	3,847	26.67%	382	2.65%
2006	7,650	61.20%	4,850	38.80%	0	0.00%
2012	11,179	66.48%	5,255	31.25%	381	2.27%
2018	10,242	69.65%	4,145	28.19%	317	2.16%
2024	15,778	73.62%	5,066	23.64%	588	2.74%

United States Senate election results for Tioga County, Pennsylvania3
Year	Republican		Democratic		Third party(ies)	
Year	No.	%	No.	%	No.	%
1992	8,853	55.72%	5,831	36.70%	1,205	7.58%
1998	7,045	70.69%	2,523	25.32%	398	3.99%
2004	11,845	69.69%	3,813	22.43%	1,338	7.87%
2010	8,651	72.07%	3,352	27.93%	0	0.00%
2016	13,418	73.83%	3,992	21.97%	764	4.20%
2022	11,988	72.08%	4,103	24.67%	541	3.25%

Pennsylvania Gubernatorial election results for Tioga County
Year	Republican		Democratic		Third party(ies)	
Year	No.	%	No.	%	No.	%
1970	6,615	60.69%	3,953	36.27%	331	3.04%
1974	7,274	64.63%	3,866	34.35%	115	1.02%
1978	8,371	74.51%	2,827	25.16%	37	0.33%
1982	6,998	61.77%	4,233	37.36%	99	0.87%
1986	6,392	56.31%	4,835	42.59%	125	1.10%
1990	4,310	42.90%	5,737	57.10%	0	0.00%
1994	7,939	65.89%	3,417	28.36%	693	5.75%
1998	7,000	70.54%	2,071	20.87%	852	8.59%
2002	7,696	69.12%	3,275	29.41%	163	1.46%
2006	7,370	58.98%	5,126	41.02%	0	0.00%
2010	9,069	75.56%	2,933	24.44%	0	0.00%
2014	7,929	69.13%	3,541	30.87%	0	0.00%
2018	10,472	70.86%	3,991	27.01%	315	2.13%
2022	11,840	71.08%	4,494	26.98%	324	1.95%

Tioga County is one of the most heavily Republican represented counties in Pennsylvania. This has a long history as Abraham Lincoln reportedly received 78.57% of the county's vote in the 1860 Presidential election. Since Abraham Lincoln the county has voted for the non-Republican presidential candidate only two times. The first was Theodore Roosevelt's 1912 run as a Progressive and the second was Lyndon B. Johnson's landslide in 1964. In 2004, George W. Bush received 12,019 votes (68%) to 5,437 votes (31%) for John Kerry. In 2008 John McCain received 62.7% of the vote. In 2020, despite the state's slight leftward swing, the county swung further right to give Donald Trump the best Republican result since 1956. In 2006, Rick Santorum and Lynn Swann both had significant victories in Tioga County despite their defeats statewide. The last two sitting Board of Commissioners have been all Republican candidates, and Tioga County is the only county in Pennsylvania with all three sitting commissioners being from a single party. This was due to the success of write in campaigns conducted by Roger Bunn in 2011 and Mark Hamilton in 2015.

=== Elected officials ===
==== United States senator ====
- Dave McCormick (Republican)
- John Fetterman (Democrat)

==== United States Congress ====
- Glenn Thompson (Republican) – 15th Pennsylvania Congressional District (Includes all of Tioga County).

==== Pennsylvania state senator ====
- Gene Yaw – 23rd District, Pennsylvania State Senate

==== Pennsylvania state representative ====
- Clint Owlett (Republican) – 68th District, Pennsylvania House of Representatives

==== County commissioners ====
- Roger C. Bunn, chair (Republican)
- Erick J. Coolidge (Republican)
- Mark L. Hamilton, vice-chair (Republican)

==== Court of Common Pleas judge, 4th Judicial District of Pennsylvania ====
- George W. Wheeler (Republican/Democrat)

==== Magisterial district judge ====
- James E. Carlson – District Court 04-3-02 (Mansfield)
- Robert Repard – District Court 04-3-02 (Wellsboro)
- James Edgecomb – District Court 04-3-01 (Elkland)

==== District attorney ====
- Krista Deats (Republican)

==== Register of wills / recorder of deeds ====
- Jane E. Wetherbee (Republican)

==== Prothonotary / clerk of courts ====
- Marie Seymour (Republican)

==== County treasurer ====
- Kera Hackett (Republican)

==== Sheriff ====
- Frank Levindoski (Republican)

==== Coroner ====
- James Dougherty

==== Auditors ====
- Rebecca B. Briggs (Republican)
- Elizabeth T. Craig (Republican)
- Amy Kane Perry (Republican)

== Education ==
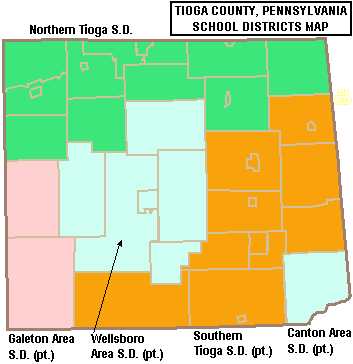
Map of Tioga County, Pennsylvania Public School Districts

=== Colleges and universities ===
- Mansfield University in Mansfield is a member of the Pennsylvania State System of Higher Education.

=== Public school districts ===
School districts include:

- Canton Area School District (also in Bradford County and Lycoming County)
- Galeton Area School District (also in Potter County)
- Northern Tioga School District
- Southern Tioga School District (also in Lycoming County)
- Wellsboro Area School District

=== Private schools ===
As reported by EdNA, Pennsylvania Department of Education, June 2010.

- Covington Community DCC, Covington
- Irvin Comstock Seventh-Day Adventist School, Wellsboro
- Laurel Youth Services, Blossburg
- Lauries Bright Beginnings CCC, Millerton
- Mansfield Area Nursery School, Mansfield
- Maranatha Mission Learning Community Branch 20, Trout Run
- New Covenant Academy, Mansfield
- Presbyterian Child Development Center, Wellsboro
- Stony Fork Mennonite School, Wellsboro
- Trinity Lutheran School, Wellsboro
- Toddler University, Blossburg
- Toddler University, Trinity
- Wellsboro Montessori Children's Center, Wellsboro
- Wesley Academy, Elkland

=== Public libraries ===
- Blossburg Memorial Library
- Elkland Area Community Library
- Green Free Library – Wellsboro
- Knoxville Public Library
- Mansfield Free Public Library
- Potter-Tioga County Lib System
- Westfield Public Library

== Transportation ==
Public transportation is provided by BeST Transit.

=== Major highways ===
- I-99
- US 6
- US 15
- US 15 Bus.
- PA 14
- PA 49
- PA 249
- PA 287
- PA 328
- PA 349
- PA 362
- PA 414
- PA 549
- PA 660

== Recreation ==
There are three Pennsylvania state parks in Tioga County.

- Hills Creek State Park is several miles north of U.S. Route 6 between Wellsboro and Mansfield in Charleston Township.
- Colton Point State Park and Leonard Harrison State Park are both part of the Pennsylvania Grand Canyon that is carved by Pine Creek.

== Communities ==
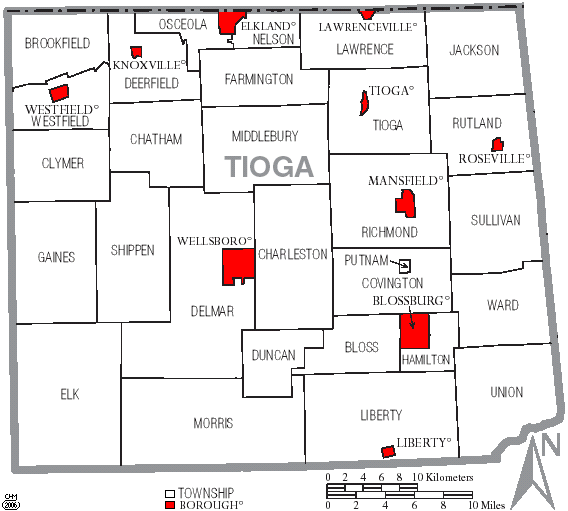
Map of Tioga County, Pennsylvania with Municipal Labels showing Boroughs (red) and Townships (white).

Under Pennsylvania law, there are four types of incorporated municipalities: cities, boroughs, townships, and, in at most two cases, towns. The following boroughs and townships are located in Tioga County:

=== Boroughs ===
- Blossburg
- Elkland
- Knoxville
- Lawrenceville
- Liberty
- Mansfield
- Roseville
- Tioga
- Wellsboro (county seat)
- Westfield

=== Townships ===
- Bloss
- Brookfield
- Charleston
- Chatham
- Clymer
- Covington
- Deerfield
- Delmar
- Duncan
- Elk
- Farmington
- Gaines
- Hamilton
- Jackson
- Lawrence
- Liberty
- Middlebury
- Morris
- Nelson
- Osceola
- Putnam
- Richmond
- Rutland
- Shippen
- Sullivan
- Tioga
- Union
- Ward
- Westfield

=== Census-designated places ===
Census-designated places are geographical areas designated by the U.S. Census Bureau for the purposes of compiling demographic data. They are not actual jurisdictions under Pennsylvania law. Other unincorporated communities, such as villages, may be listed here as well.

- Arnot
- Millerton

=== Ghost towns ===
Tioga County is historically home to several ghost towns for a variety of reasons, chiefly the decline of the lumber and coal industry. Most prominently is Leetonia, a former timber company town. Some small hamlets, such as Mardin and Olde Corner, who relied on Rural Free Delivery for trade met their downfall. Former borough Fall Brook was a site of coal discovered in 1856, and Landrus first was settled to build a sawmill.

=== Population ranking ===
The population ranking of the following table is based on the 2010 census of Tioga County.

† county seat

Rank	City/Town/etc.	Municipal type	Population (2010 Census)
1	Mansfield	Borough	3,625
2	† Wellsboro	Borough	3,263
3	Elkland	Borough	1,821
4	Blossburg	Borough	1,538
5	Westfield	Borough	1,064
6	Tioga	Borough	666
7	Knoxville	Borough	629
8	Lawrenceville	Borough	581
9	Arnot	CDP	332
10	Millerton	CDP	316
11	Liberty	Borough	249
12	Roseville	Borough	189

== See also ==
- National Register of Historic Places listings in Tioga County, Pennsylvania
