= Westfield, Pennsylvania =

Borough in Pennsylvania, US

- Borough
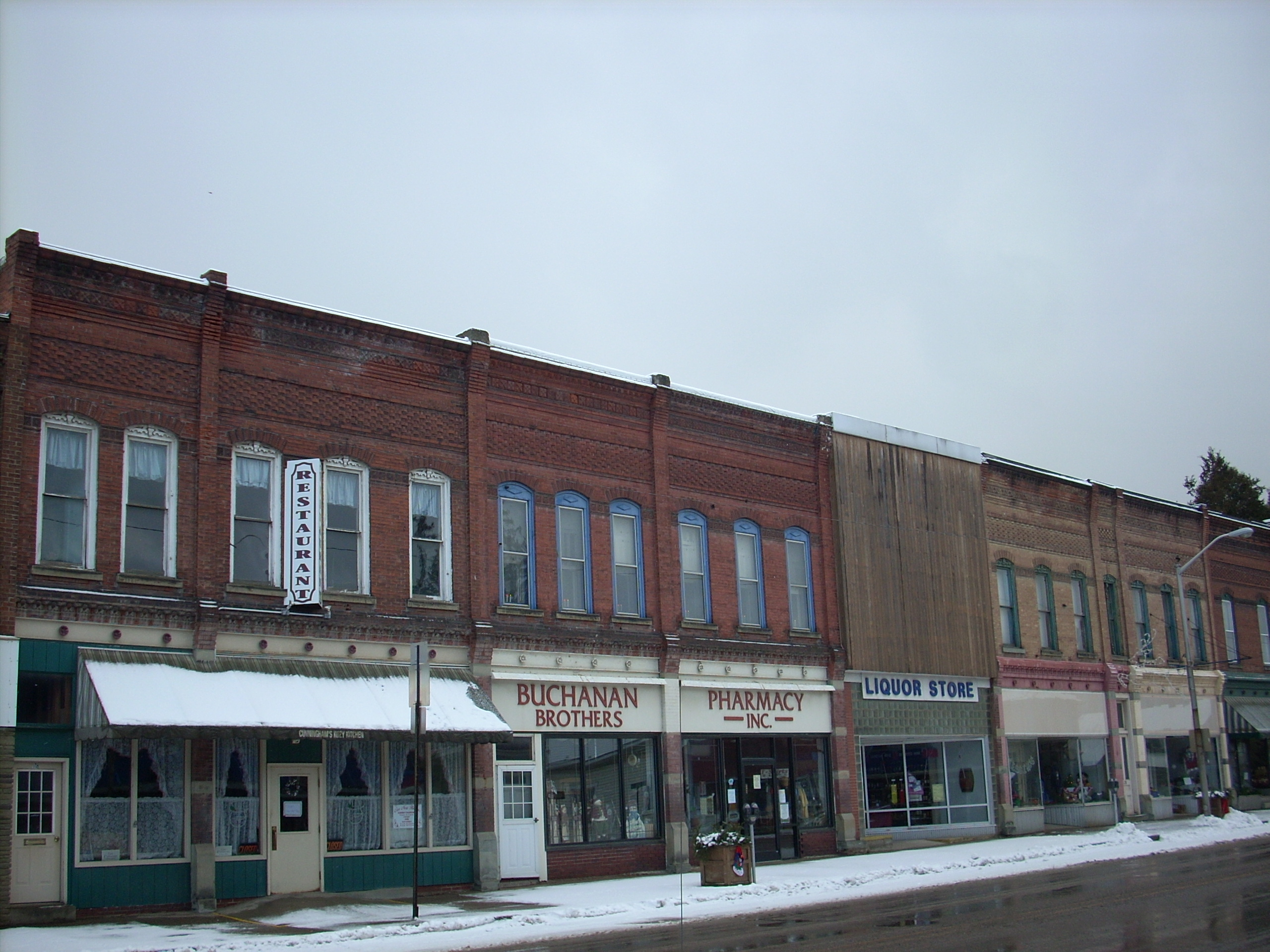
- Downtown Westfield

- Location of Westfield in Tioga County, Pennsylvania.

- Location within the U.S. state of Pennsylvania Westfield (the United States)
- Coordinates: 41°55′10″N 77°32′19″W
- Country: United States
- State: Pennsylvania
- County: Tioga
- Settled: 1809
- Incorporated (borough): 1867

Area
  - Total: 1.12 sq mi (2.89 km^{2})
  - Land: 1.12 sq mi (2.89 km^{2})
  - Water: 0 sq mi (0.00 km^{2})
- Elevation: 1,365 ft (416 m)

Population (2020)
  - Total: 1,113 ▲
  - Estimate (2021): 1,109
  - Density: 929.1/sq mi (358.74/km^{2})
- Time zone: Eastern (EST)
  - Summer (DST): EDT
- ZIP code: 16950
- Area code: 814
- FIPS code: 42-82968
- Website: https://westfieldborough.org/

Westfield is a borough in Tioga County, Pennsylvania, United States. The population was 1,113 at the time of the 2020 census.

== Geography ==
Westfield is located at 41°55′4″N 77°32′25″W (41.917910, -77.540315).

According to the United States Census Bureau, the borough has a total area of 1.0 square mile (2.6 km^{2}), all of it land.

== Demographics ==
Historical population
Census	Pop.	Note	%±
1870	370		—
1880	579		56.5%
1890	1,128		94.8%
1900	1,180		4.6%
1910	1,207		2.3%
1920	1,303		8.0%
1930	1,193		−8.4%
1940	1,386		16.2%
1950	1,357		−2.1%
1960	1,333		−1.8%
1970	1,273		−4.5%
1980	1,268		−0.4%
1990	1,119		−11.8%
2000	1,190		6.3%
2010	1,064		−10.6%
2020	1,112		4.5%
2021 (est.)	1,109	▼	−0.3%

As of the census of 2000, there were 1,190 people, 495 households, and 330 families residing in the borough.

The population density was 1,148.8 inhabitants per square mile (443.6/km^{2}). There were 551 housing units at an average density of 531.9 per square mile (205.4/km^{2}).

The racial makeup of the borough was 97.56% White, 1.01% African American, 0.34% Native American, 0.25% Asian, 0.25% from other races, and 0.59% from two or more races. Hispanic or Latino of any race were 0.59% of the population.

There were 495 households, out of which 29.5% had children under the age of eighteen living with them; 49.7% were married couples living together, 12.1% had a female householder with no husband present, and 33.3% were non-families. 28.9% of all households were made up of individuals, and 16.4% had someone living alone who was sixty-five years of age or older.

The average household size was 2.36 and the average family size was 2.85.

In the borough the population was spread out, with 25.3% under the age of eighteen, 7.1% from eighteen to twenty-four, 27.6% from twenty-five to forty-four, 20.3% from forty-five to sixty-four, and 19.8% who were sixty-five years of age or older. The median age was thirty-nine years.

For every one hundred females there were 89.5 males. For every one hundred females who were aged eighteen or older, there were 82.2 males.

The median income for a household in the borough was $27,772, and the median income for a family was $33,688. Males had a median income of $26,607 compared with that of $18,424 for females.

The per capita income for the borough was $13,135.

Roughly 15.9% of families and 22.1% of the population were living below the poverty line, including 29.4% of those who were under the age of eighteen and 13.1% of those who were aged sixty-five or older.

== Business ==
Westfield Pennsylvania is known for the now closed Eberle Tannery, (closed in 2004) which was one of the biggest sole leather shoe producers in the world in 1976. The tannery was located on Church Street; demolition of tannery buildings was completed in 2021.

== Education ==
It is in the Northern Tioga School District.
