= Stony Fork Creek =

Stony Fork
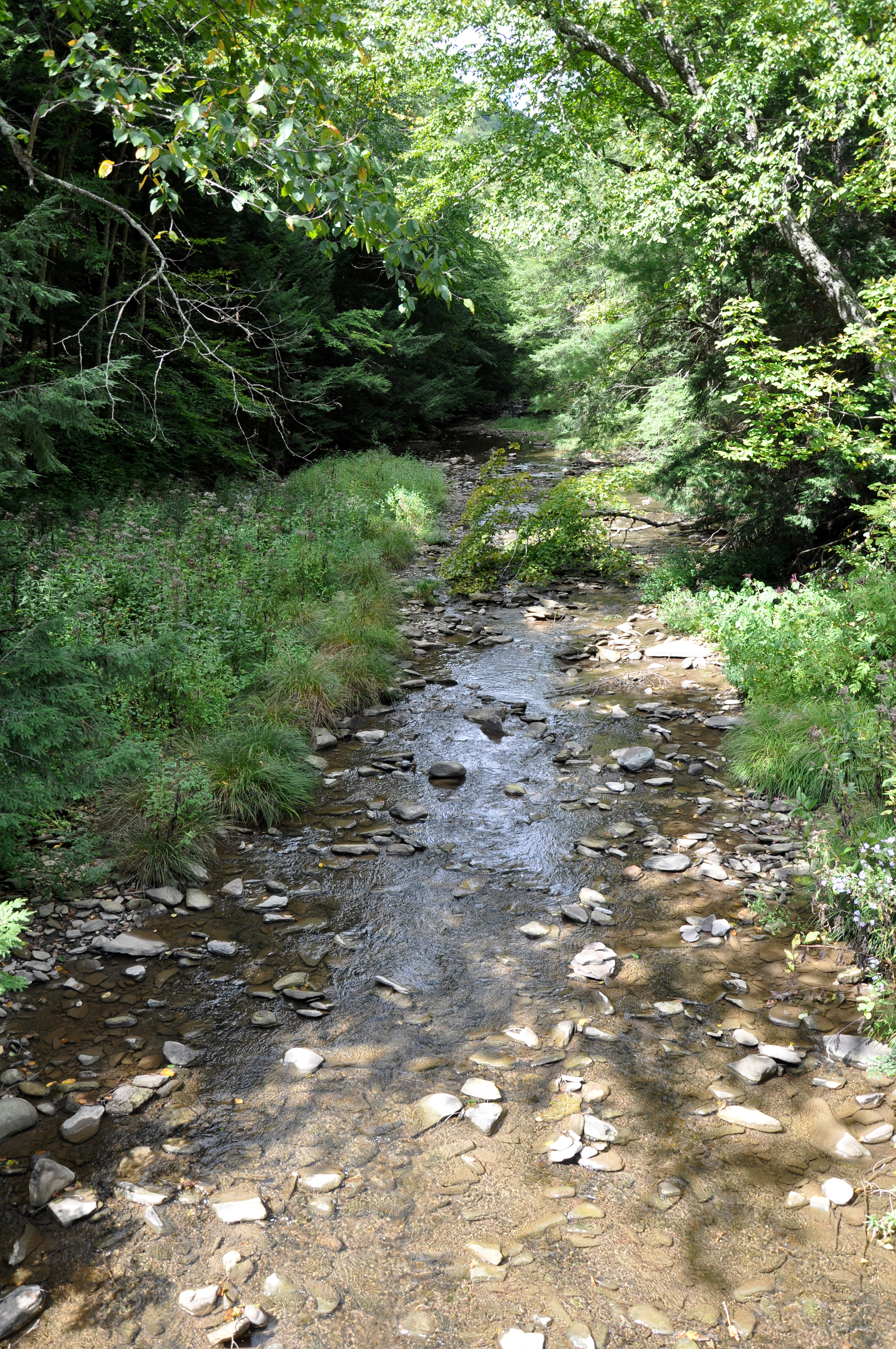
- Along Stony Fork Road

- Location of the mouth of Stony Fork in Pennsylvania

Location
- Country: United States
- State: Pennsylvania
- County: Tioga County

Physical characteristics
- Source: confluence of the creek's east and west branches
  - location: Tioga State Forest northwest of Morris, Tioga County
  - coordinates: 41°37′13″N 77°22′08″W
  - elevation: 1,208 ft (368 m)
- Mouth: Babb Creek
  - location: near Pennsylvania Route 414 east of Blackwell
  - coordinates: 41°34′21″N 77°20′15″W
  - elevation: 1,201 ft (366 m)
- Length: 4.1 mi (6.6 km)

Stony Fork Creek (shown as Stony Fork on federal maps) is a 4.1-mile-long (6.6 km) tributary of Babb Creek in Tioga County, Pennsylvania in the United States.

== Course ==
Stony Fork begins at the confluence of its east and west branches in the Tioga State Forest northwest of Morris. It flows south, receiving Black Run and Roland Run, both from the left. Stony Fork Road follows the entire length of the stream.

Stony Fork merges with Babb Creek near the unincorporated community of Doane, along Pennsylvania Route 414 between Morris and Blackwell. Babb Creek is a tributary of Pine Creek, a tributary of the West Branch Susquehanna River.

== See also ==
- List of rivers of Pennsylvania
