= Slate Run, Pennsylvania =

Unincorporated community in Pennsylvania, US

- Unincorporated community
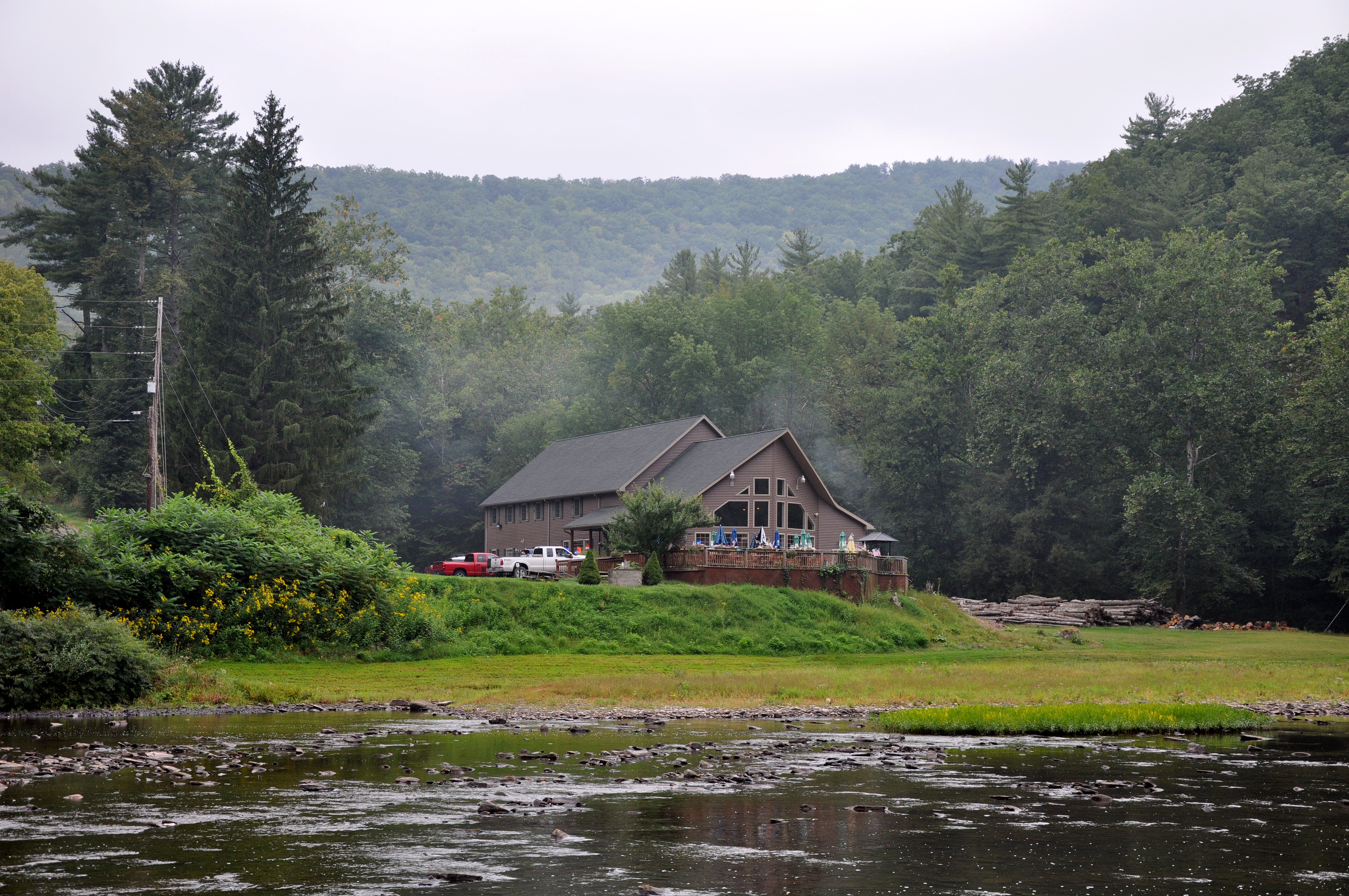
- Hotel Manor in Slate Run along Pine Creek

- Location within Pennsylvania Location within the United States
- Coordinates: 41°28′22″N 77°30′06″W
- Country: United States
- State: Pennsylvania
- County: Lycoming
- Township: Brown
- Elevation: 751 ft (229 m)
- Time zone: UTC-5 (Eastern (EST))
  - Summer (DST): UTC-4 (EDT)
- ZIP: 17769
- Area code: 570
- GNIS feature ID: 1199976

Slate Run is an unincorporated community in Brown Township, Lycoming County, in the U.S. state of Pennsylvania. It lies between Blackwell and Waterville along Pennsylvania Route 414. Slate Run, a stream with the same name as the community, enters Pine Creek at Slate Run, in the Pine Creek Gorge. The Pine Creek Rail Trail passes through the village.

== History ==
Pioneer settler Jacob Tomb and his family established a home, sawmill, and gristmill at the mouth of Slate Run in the 1790s, and others settled nearby along the Pine Creek floodplain. By 1855, the village had a post office, general store, hotel, and two churches.

Driving the local economy toward the end of the century was the James B. Weed and Company hemlock sawmill, which operated in Slate Run from 1886 to 1910 and produced up to 100,000 board feet of lumber a day. After the end of the lumber era, the mill closed, and the village declined in size. However, in the early 21st century, Slate Run still has a general store and post office, and a hotel with a restaurant and bar.
