= Leetonia, Pennsylvania =

Unincorporated community in Pennsylvania, US

- Unincorporated community
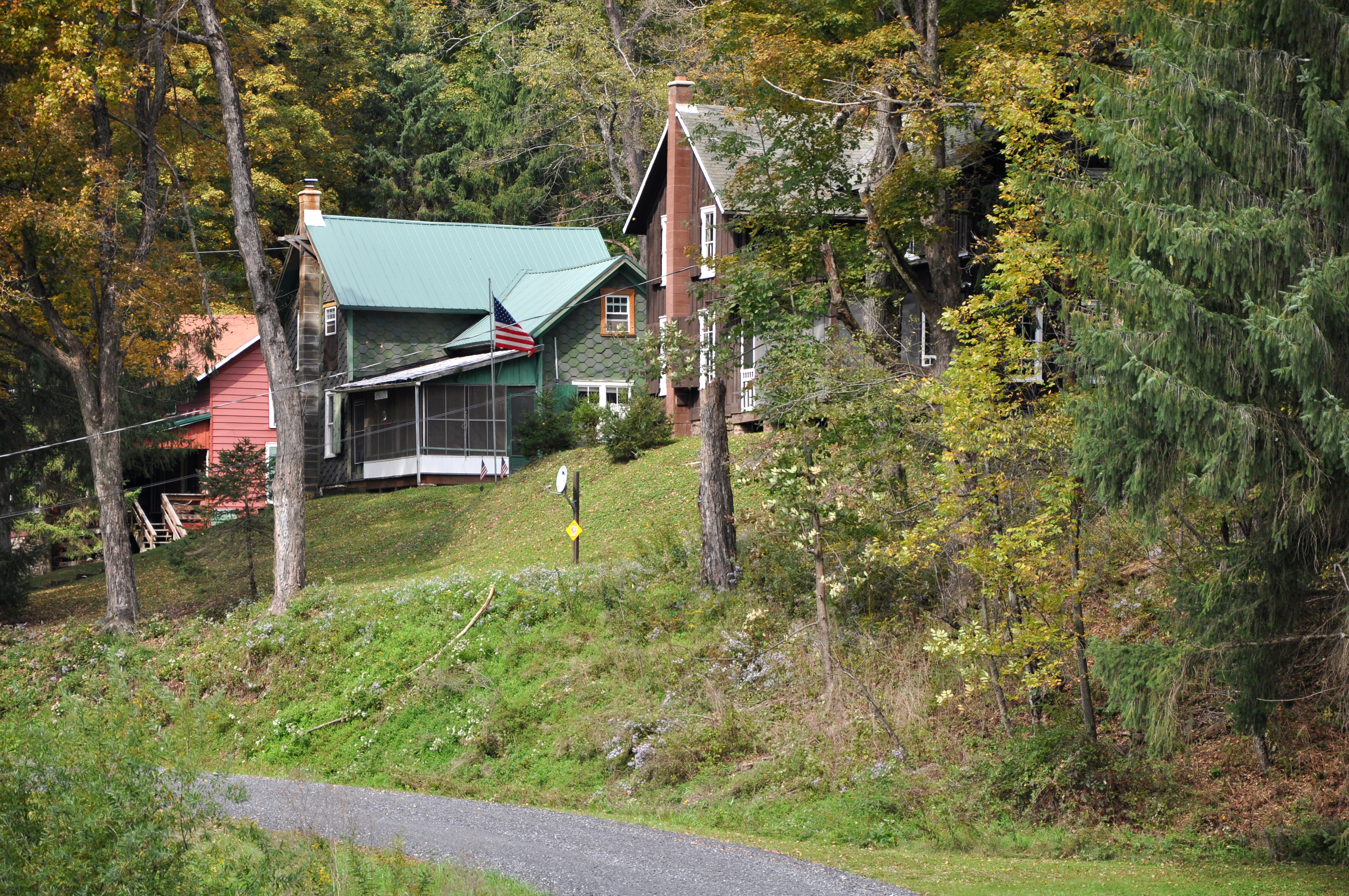
- Along Leetonia Road in 2012

- Location within Pennsylvania
- Coordinates: 41°35′59″N 77°29′43″W
- Country: United States
- State: Pennsylvania
- County: Tioga
- Elevation: 1,263 ft (385 m)
- Time zone: UTC-5 (Eastern (EST))
  - Summer (DST): UTC-4 (EDT)
- ZIP: 17727
- Area code: 570
- GNIS feature ID: 1179132

Leetonia is an unincorporated community in Elk Township, Tioga County, in the U.S. state of Pennsylvania. It lies along Leetonia Road, in the Tioga State Forest between Pennsylvania Route 414 and U.S. Route 6.

Cedar Run and two of its tributaries, Slide Island Draft and Frying Pan Run, flow through Leetonia. Cedar Run is a tributary of Pine Creek.

== History ==
The community was named for W. Creighton Lee, who in 1879 built a tannery along Cedar Run about 7 miles (11 km) upstream of its confluence with Pine Creek at the village of Cedar Run. Daily stagecoaches carrying mail and passengers connected the two villages in the 1880s. Wagons hauled lumber and tanned leather to the Cedar Run station on the New York Central Railroad line through the Pine Creek Gorge. In 1899, a new line, the Leetonia Railroad, linked Leetonia more directly with the New York Central at Tiadaghton, about 10 miles (16 km) north of Cedar Run along Pine Creek. Shay locomotives provided the power on this mountainous spur line.

The Central Pennsylvania Lumber Company bought the land, tannery, and an existing hemlock sawmill in 1903. Leetonia became a company town that included a group of nearly identical houses, all painted red. Timber cutting in the region continued until there were few trees left to fell. By 1921, the sawmill and tannery closed, and most of Leetonia's residents moved elsewhere.

Between 1933 and 1941, Leetonia was the site of Civilian Conservation Corps (CCC) Camp S-90-Pa. After arriving at the camp site, Company 328, consisting of 193 men, built barracks and worked on forest conservation, trail making, wildlife protection, and construction of state parks. After a flood on the West Branch Susquehanna River in 1936, the men were sent to the nearby city of Williamsport, where for 19 days they cleaned and disinfected flood-damaged buildings.
