= Pine Creek Rail Trail =

Rail trail in Pennsylvania, United States

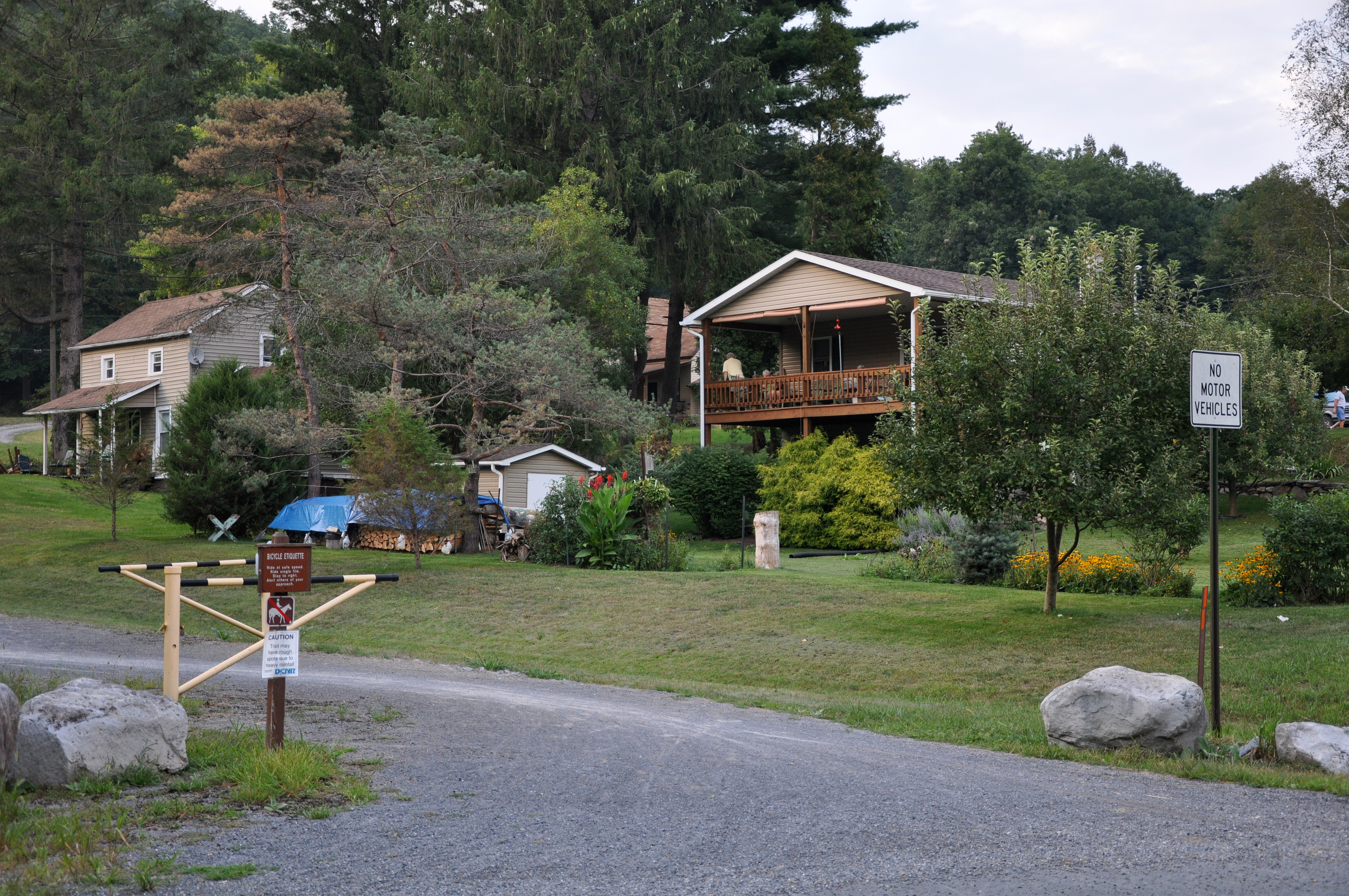
- Rail trail passing through Blackwell

Pine Creek Rail Trail
- Length: 65.6 miles
- Location: Lycoming and Tioga Counties, Pennsylvania, U.S.
- Established: 1996, 2007 to Wellsboro, 2012 in Jersey Shore
- Designation: BicyclePA Route G
- Trailheads: Route 287, Wellsboro, PA 41.788221°N 77.308019°W Railroad Street, Jersey Shore, PA 41.199888°N 77.287065°W
- Use: Hiking and cycling
- Grade: Gentle (former railroad)
- Difficulty: Easy
- Season: Hiking and cycling in spring, summer, and fall; cross-country skiing in winter
- Sights: Pine Creek Gorge, hawks, Canada geese, and occasionally bald eagles, American black bears and white-tailed deer
- Hazards: Severe weather, poison ivy, bears
- Surface: Crushed limestone

The Pine Creek Rail Trail is the only rail trail in the Appalachian Mountains of north-central Pennsylvania.

The trail begins just north of Wellsboro, runs south through Pine Creek Gorge (also known as the Grand Canyon of Pennsylvania) and ends at Jersey Shore. An article in USA Today from 2001 named the 65-mile-long (105 km) trail as one of the "10 great places to take a bike tour" in the world.

== Route ==
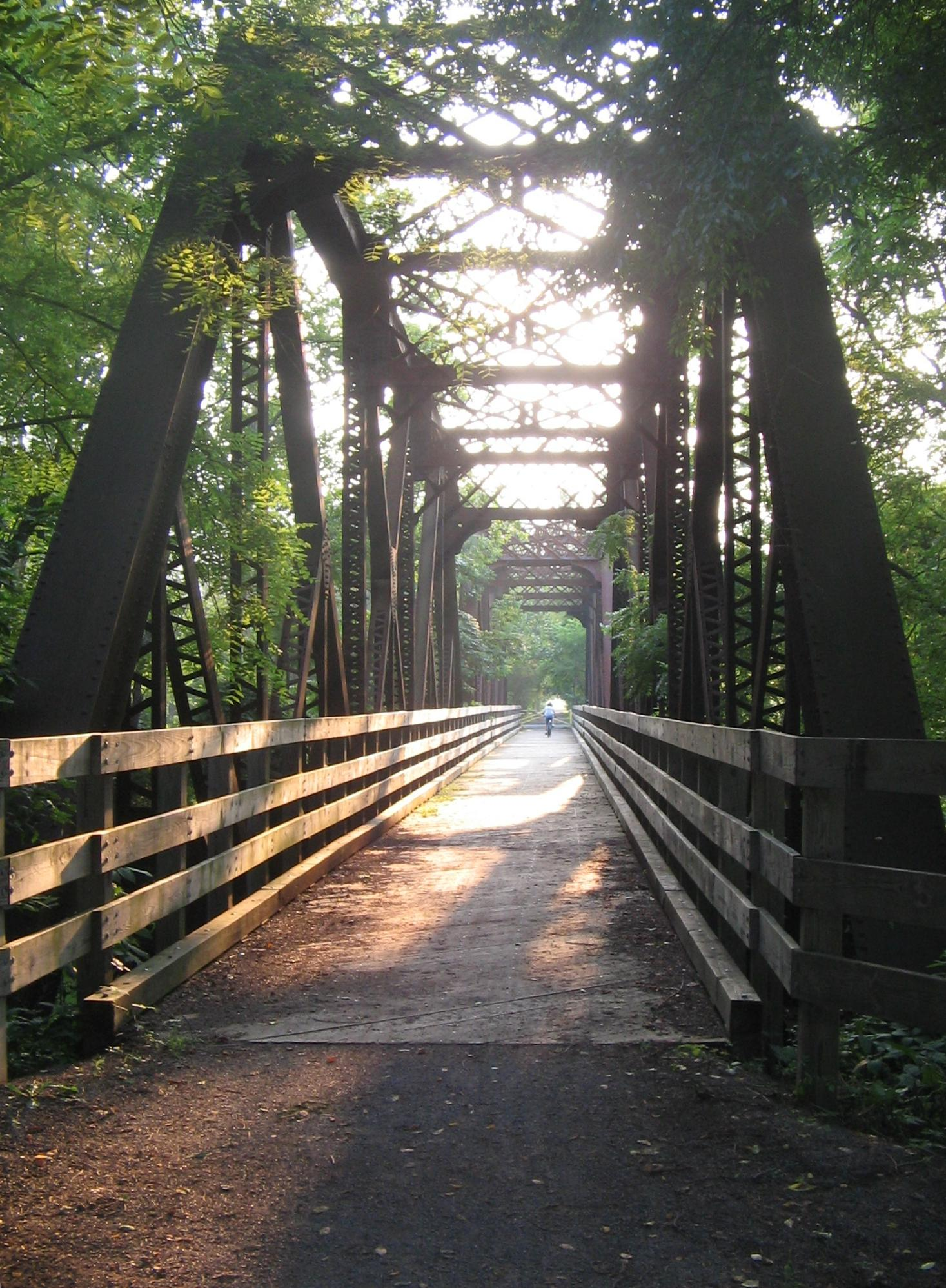
The rail trail uses a former New York Central Railroad bridge to cross over Little Pine Creek in Waterville

The Pine Creek Rail Trail spans approximately 65 miles (105 km) from end to end, following a primarily north–south orientation. It is located entirely within Tioga and Lycoming Counties. Additionally, a portion of the trail is designated as BicyclePA Route G.

The trail's northern terminus is near the intersection of U.S. Route 6 and Pennsylvania Route 287, about 3 miles (4.8 km) north of Wellsboro. Parking for the northern terminus is located at the southernmost end of Butler Road. The trail parallels Route 6 in a southwesterly direction for about 6 miles (9.7 km) until it reaches the village of Ansonia. South of Ansonia, the trail parallels Pine Creek as it goes south along the floor of Pine Creek Gorge. It passes through Leonard Harrison State Park and the Tioga State Forest. Approximately 17 miles (27 km) south of Ansonia, the trail passes through the village of Blackwell. The section between Ansonia and Blackwell is very remote, and much of the trail is inaccessible by road.

South of Blackwell, the trail enters Lycoming County and the Tiadaghton State Forest. It parallels Pennsylvania Route 414 for about 25 miles (40 km). Pennsylvania Route 414 ends near the unincorporated village of Waterville. South of Waterville, the trail parallels Pennsylvania Route 44 for approximately 17 miles (27 km) until the trail reaches its southern terminus in Jersey Shore. (Parking at Railroad St. and Humes St.) Between Blackwell and Jersey Shore, the trail crosses the highway and Pine Creek several times, and it is almost always within sight of both the road and the creek.

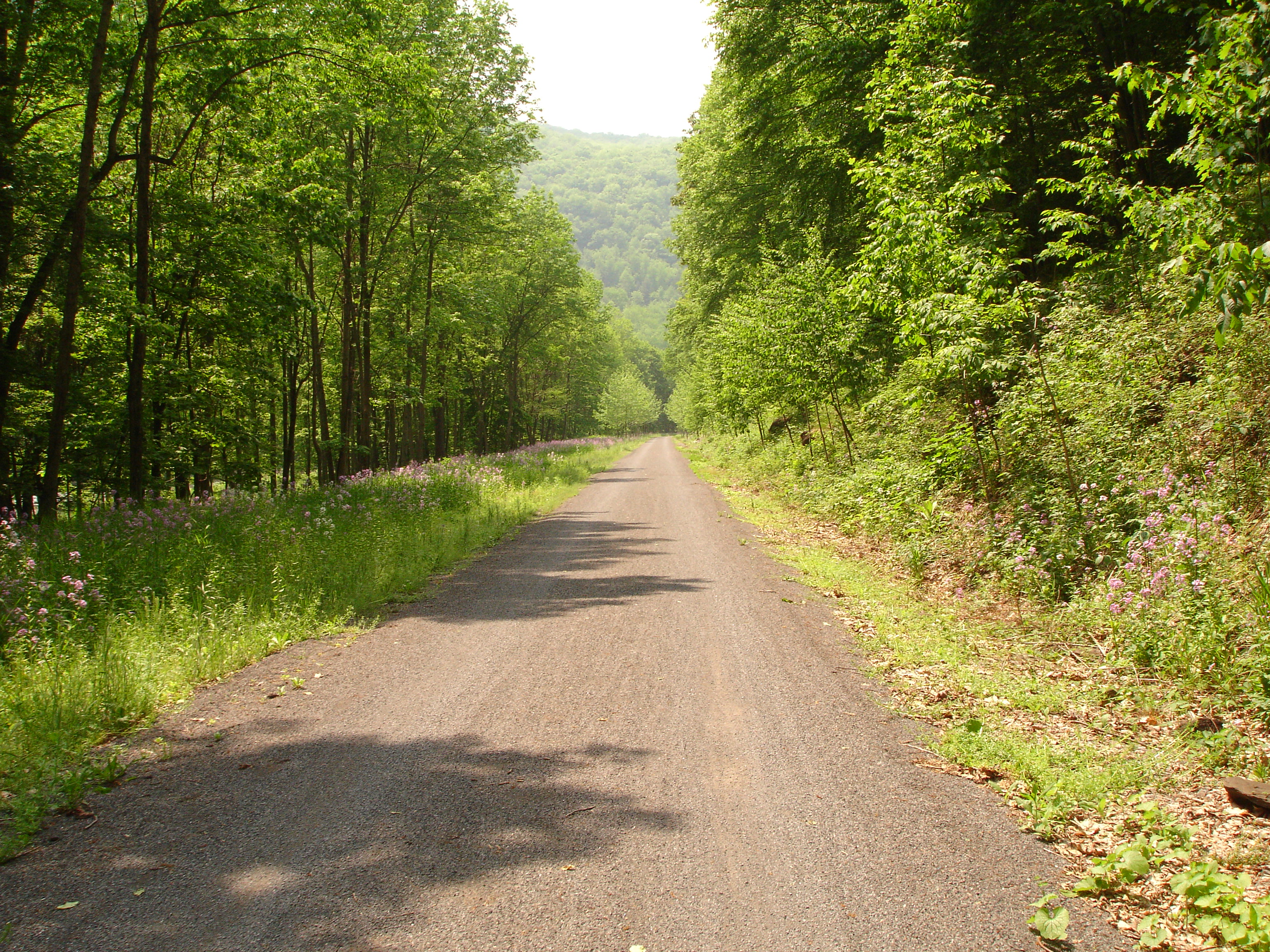
Pine Creek Rail Trail near Blackwell (2005)

Boroughs, villages, and attractions located along or near the trail (from north to south):

- Wellsboro
- Asaph
- Ansonia
- Leonard Harrison State Park
- Colton Point State Park is located on the western side of Pine Creek, but no public bridges span the creek between Ansonia and Blackwell.
- Tioga State Forest
- Tiadaghton
- Blackwell (Morris Township)
- Tiadaghton State Forest
- Cedar Run (Brown Township)
- Slate Run (Brown Township)
- Cammal (McHenry Township)
- Jersey Mills (McHenry Township)
- Waterville (Cummings Township)
- Little Pine State Park is located about 8 miles (13 km) north of Waterville.
- Watson Township
- Porter Township
- Jersey Shore

== History ==
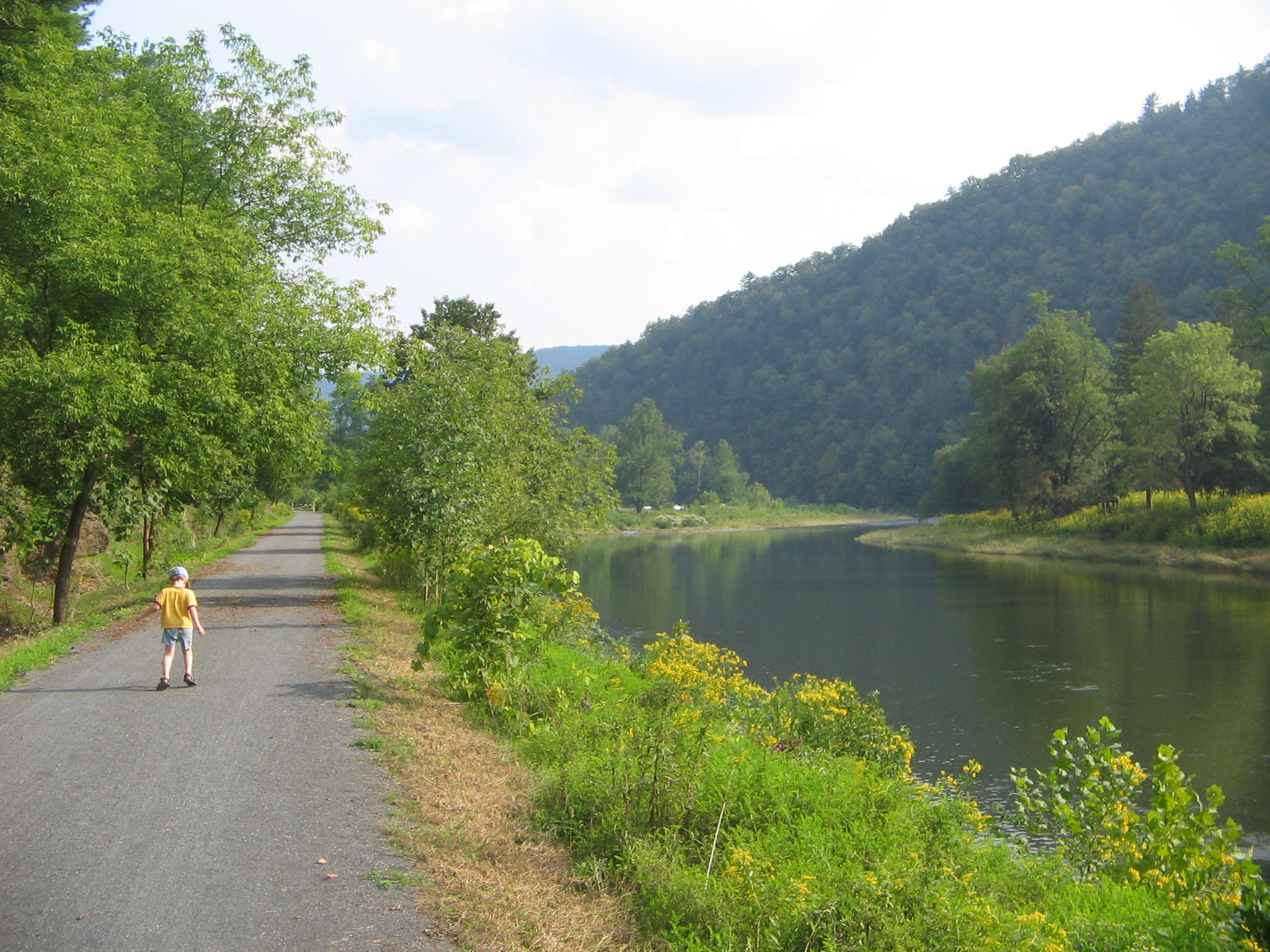
Pine Creek and the rail trail north of Waterville in Cummings Township in Lycoming County

The Native American Pine Creek Path followed Pine Creek from Jersey Shore to Ansonia and beyond. The earliest industry in the region was logging. In the years between 1820 and 1883, trees were floated down the creek to sawmills in Jersey Shore and Williamsport. In 1883, the Jersey Shore, Pine Creek and Buffalo Railway opened. Sawmills were constructed in several communities along the creek, and finished products were carried out by train. Coal mining was another important industry, and coal was also shipped along the railroad.

After a series of reorganizations, the railroad along Pine Creek became a part of the New York Central Railroad and eventually Conrail. Freight and passenger service continued until 1988, when Conrail abruptly ended rail service. The tracks were removed almost immediately after rail service ended, and the first section of the Pine Creek Rail Trail opened in 1996. The trail opened in stages with the most recent section (from Ansonia to just north of Wellsboro) being completed in 2007. The trail is operated by the Pennsylvania Department of Conservation and Natural Resources.

In 2001, an article in the USA Today newspaper named the Pine Creek Rail Trail one of "10 great places to take a bike tour" in the world. It was one of only five places in the continental United States on the list, which was compiled by Patricia Vance, author of bicycle touring guides. The article cited the "Grand Canyon of Pennsylvania" as "idyllic in fall" and mentioned the "gorge with views of the cliffs and mixed hardwood forest".

During the Great Depression, the Civilian Conservation Corps built numerous roads, bridges, and trails through the area. Evidence of their work is still visible and is commemorated with a sign near the Darling Run trail access area.

== Activities ==
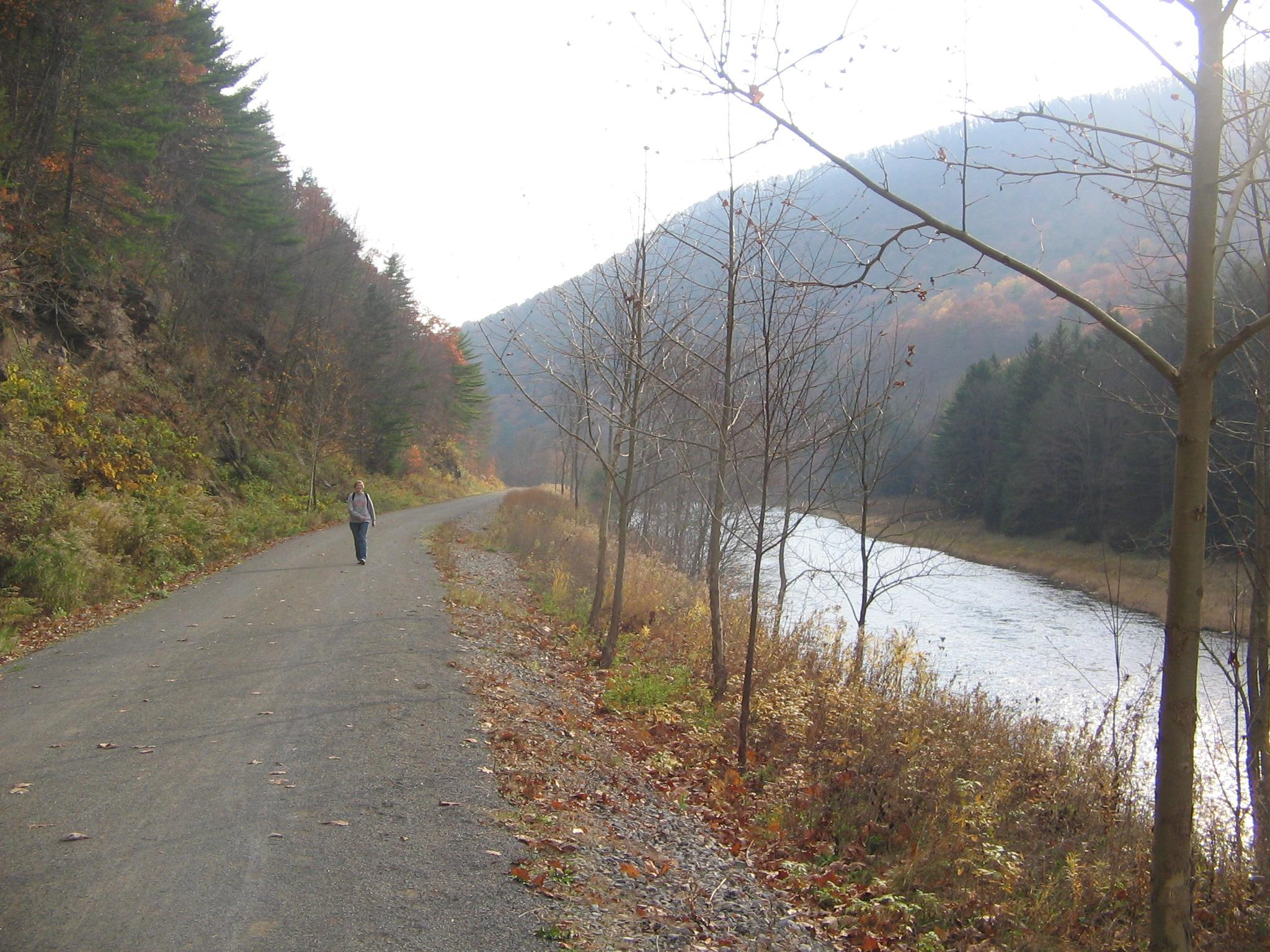
Hiker on the Pine Creek Rail Trail just north of Blackwell in Tioga County, Pennsylvania.

Due to the trail being originally constructed as a rail bed, it is relatively flat with only gentle grades. It is topped with crushed limestone. Bicycling, hiking and in the winter cross-country skiing are the only permitted activities on the trail. Without a written permit from the Pennsylvania Department of Conservation and Natural Resources, motorized vehicles are strictly forbidden from using the trail. This ban includes motorcycles, snowmobiles and all-terrain vehicles. Between Ansonia and Tiadaghton, horseback riding is permitted on the trail. There are camping sites along the trail, but require permits be obtained in advance from the Pennsylvania Department of Conservation and Natural Resources. Additional amenities along the trail include composting toilets and water pumps.

== Future expansion ==
The latest section of the trail opened in 2025 and there are no immediate plans to expand the trail at this time. Several groups have proposed expanding the trail along the West Branch Susquehanna River between Jersey Shore and Williamsport. The next phase of the Bald Eagle Valley Trail, in neighboring Clinton County, will link to the southern terminus in Jersey Shore.

== See also ==
- List of rail trails in Pennsylvania
- List of mountain biking areas and trails in Pennsylvania
