= Jersey Mills, Pennsylvania =

Unincorporated community in Pennsylvania, US

- Unincorporated community
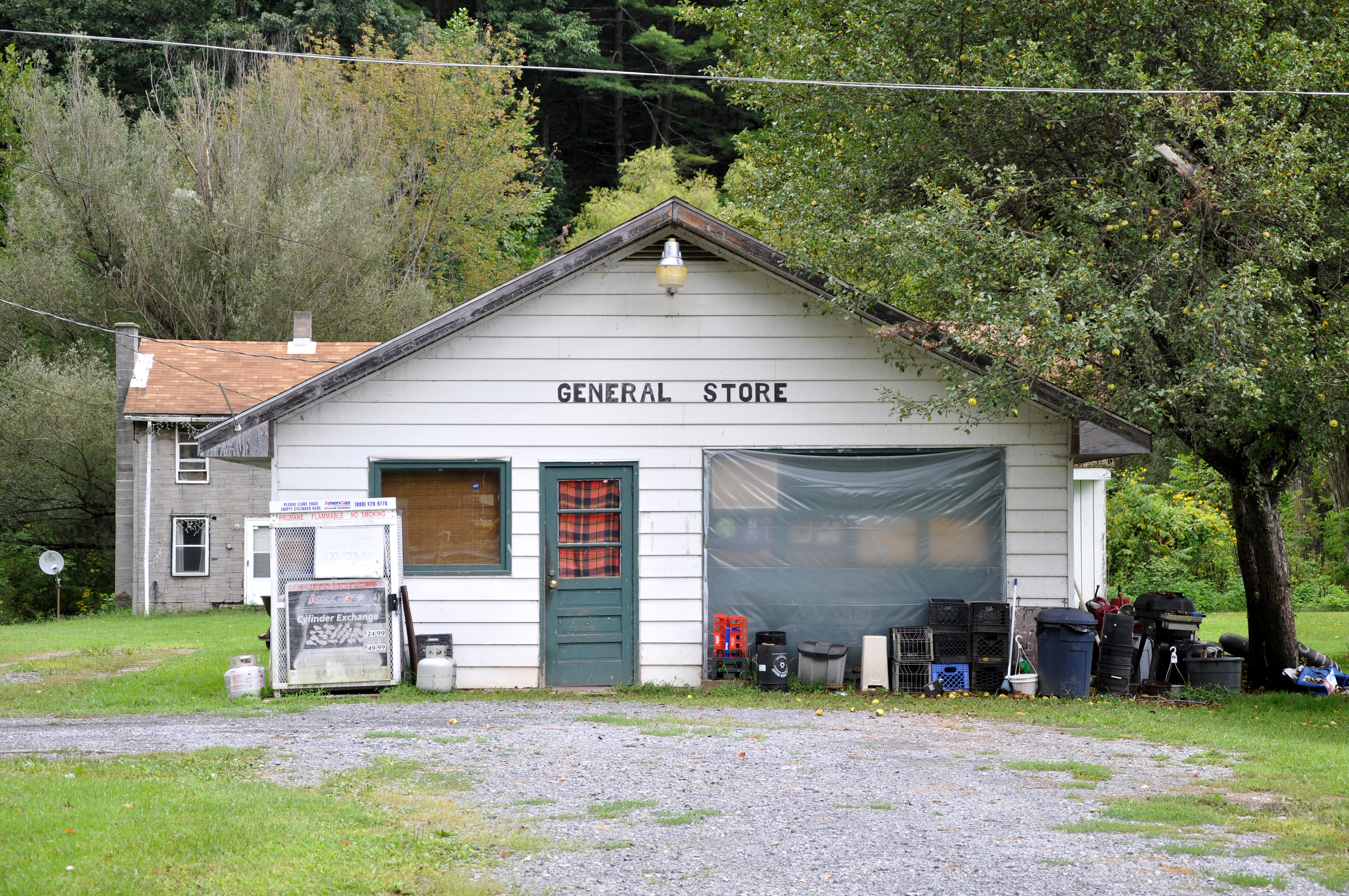
- Former store in Jersey Mills

- Location within Pennsylvania Location within the United States
- Coordinates: 41°21′26″N 77°24′24″W
- Country: United States
- State: Pennsylvania
- County: Lycoming
- Township: McHenry
- Elevation: 646 ft (197 m)
- Time zone: UTC-5 (Eastern (EST))
  - Summer (DST): UTC-4 (EDT)
- ZIP: 17739
- Area code: 570
- GNIS feature ID: 1203896

Jersey Mills is an unincorporated community in McHenry Township, Lycoming County, in the U.S. state of Pennsylvania. It lies along Pine Creek in the Pine Creek Gorge upstream of Waterville along Pennsylvania Route 414. Callahan Run enters Pine Creek at Jersey Mills. The Pine Creek Rail Trail passes through the village.

== History ==
The first white settlers in the vicinity of what became Jersey Mills arrived in the late 18th and very early 19th centuries. For the next 100 years, lumbering and farming were the main drivers of the local economy. The first lumber mill in the area began operations in 1809. Farm crops included cereal grasses and potatoes. The village of Jersey Mills was officially established in 1855, when its post office opened.

Flagstone quarries in the area provided income in the late 19th and early 20th centuries as lumbering income steeply declined. The village had a one-room school through 1946 and a general store and boarding house through 1965. A smaller general store, the last commercial business in Jersey Mills, operated from 1980 though 2007.
