= Babb Creek =

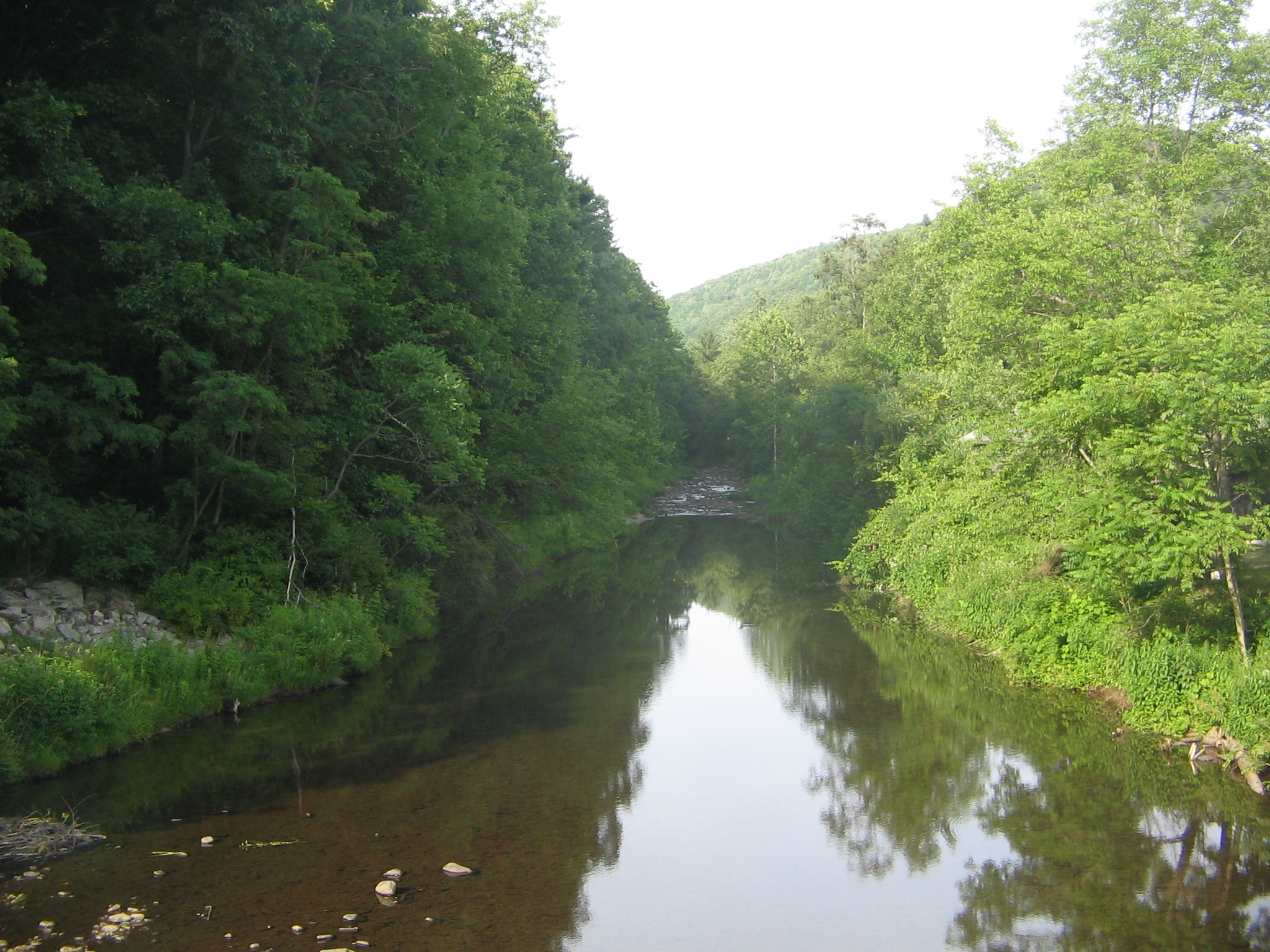
- Babb Creek from the Pennsylvania Route 287 bridge in the village of Morris

- Location of the mouth of Babb Creek in Pennsylvania

Location
- Country: United States
- State: Pennsylvania
- County: Tioga County

Physical characteristics
- Source: east of Wellsboro
  - location: Tioga State Forest, Tioga County
  - coordinates: 41°44′39″N 77°13′16″W
  - elevation: 1,902 ft (580 m)
- Mouth: Pine Creek
  - location: Blackwell, Tioga County
  - coordinates: 41°33′13″N 77°22′50″W
  - elevation: 846 ft (258 m)
- Length: 21.7 mi (34.9 km)

Babb Creek is a 21.7-mile-long (34.9 km) tributary of Pine Creek in Pennsylvania in the United States.

The tributary Stony Fork Creek joins Babb Creek just upstream of the community of Blackwell, 3.5 miles (5.6 km) upstream of Pine Creek.

Babb Creek joins Pine Creek at the community of Blackwell in Tioga County.

== See also ==
- List of rivers of Pennsylvania
