= Cammal, Pennsylvania =

Unincorporated community in Pennsylvania, US

- Unincorporated community
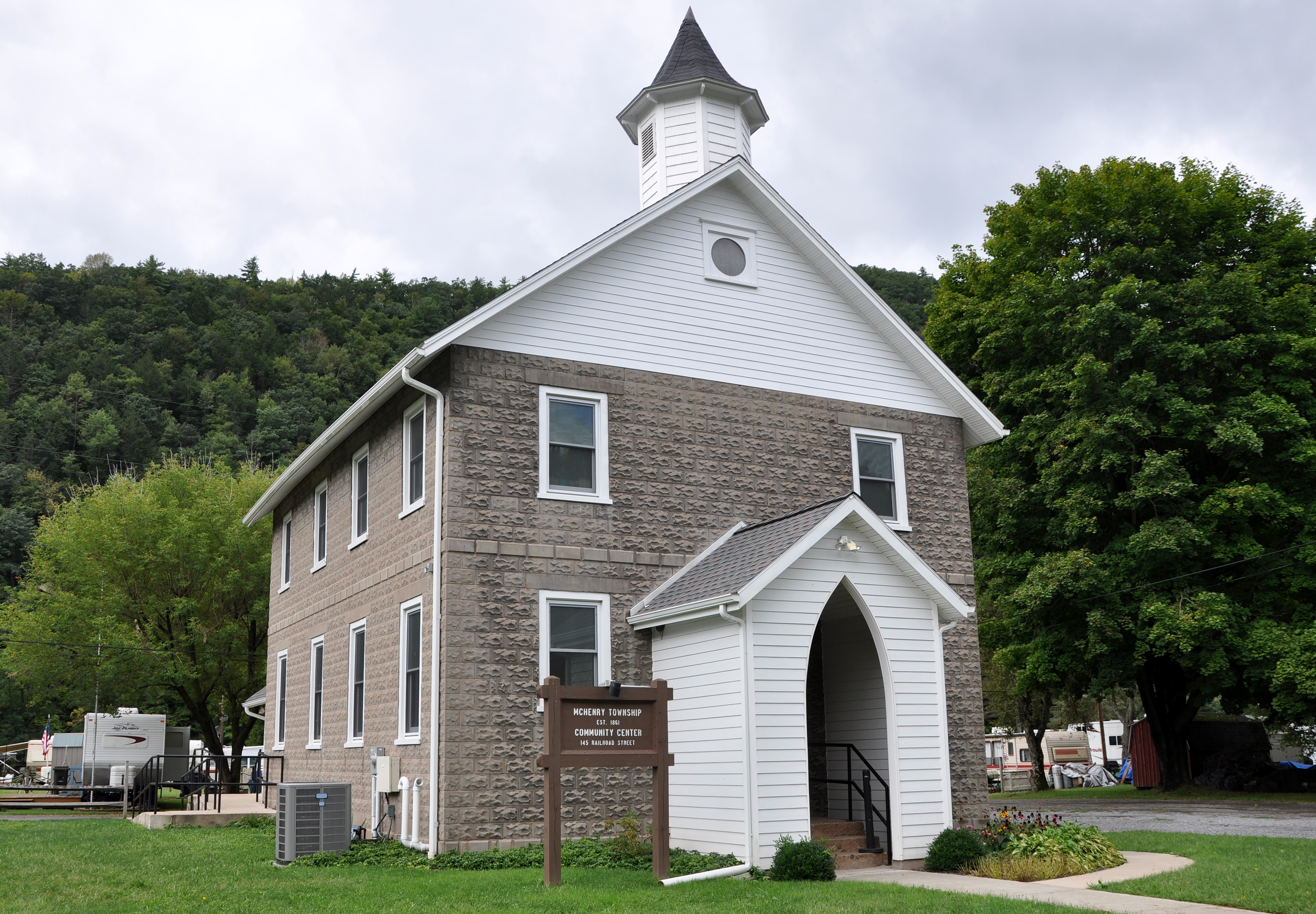
- McHenry Township Community Center in Cammal (2012)

- Location within Pennsylvania Location within the United States
- Coordinates: 41°24′12″N 77°27′47″W
- Country: United States
- State: Pennsylvania
- County: Lycoming
- Township: McHenry
- Elevation: 705 ft (215 m)
- Time zone: UTC-5 (Eastern (EST))
  - Summer (DST): UTC-4 (EDT)
- ZIP: 17723
- Area code: 570
- GNIS feature ID: 1193709

Cammal is an unincorporated community in McHenry Township, Lycoming County, in the U.S. state of Pennsylvania. It lies along Pine Creek in the Pine Creek Gorge, upstream of Waterville, along Pennsylvania Route 414. Mill Run, which flows through the nearby Tiadaghton State Forest, enters Pine Creek at Cammal. The Pine Creek Rail Trail passes through Cammal.

== History ==
Cammal is a contraction of Campbell, the last name of early settlers in the region. Around 1820, Michael Campbell began farming about 1 mile (2 km) upstream from Cammal along Pine Creek. His brothers, Abner and George, built a mill along Mill Run.

Subsistence farming, the economic mainstay in the early decades, was joined by other enterprises after the arrival of the railroads in the latter part of the 19th century. A post office opened in the village in 1884. The New York Central Railroad built a line through the Pine Creek Gorge, and by the 1890s three logging railroads—the Trout Run Railroad, the Cammal and Black Forest Railroad, and the Oregon and Texas Railway (named for two nearby mountains)— connected to the main line at Campbell. During these boom years, the village had stores, four hotels with saloons, four churches, an International Order of Odd Fellows meeting hall (which sometimes doubled as a church), and a weekly newspaper, the Pine Creek Pioneer. Local industries included a hemlock sawmill and other forest-products companies.

In 1905, after the supply of local timber dwindled, the sawmill and other timber-related industries closed. Residents who remained in Cammal found new sources of income: growing and selling ginseng through about 1940 to Chinese buyers from Philadelphia, providing services to tourists and sportsmen, and working for the railroad or the state forestry or highway departments.

In 2002 the post office closed. However, in the early 21st century, the village still has a few businesses including a saloon and restaurant, a campground, and a community center in the former Odd Fellows hall.
