= McHenry Township, Pennsylvania =

Township in Pennsylvania, US

McHenry Township, Lycoming County, Pennsylvania
- Township
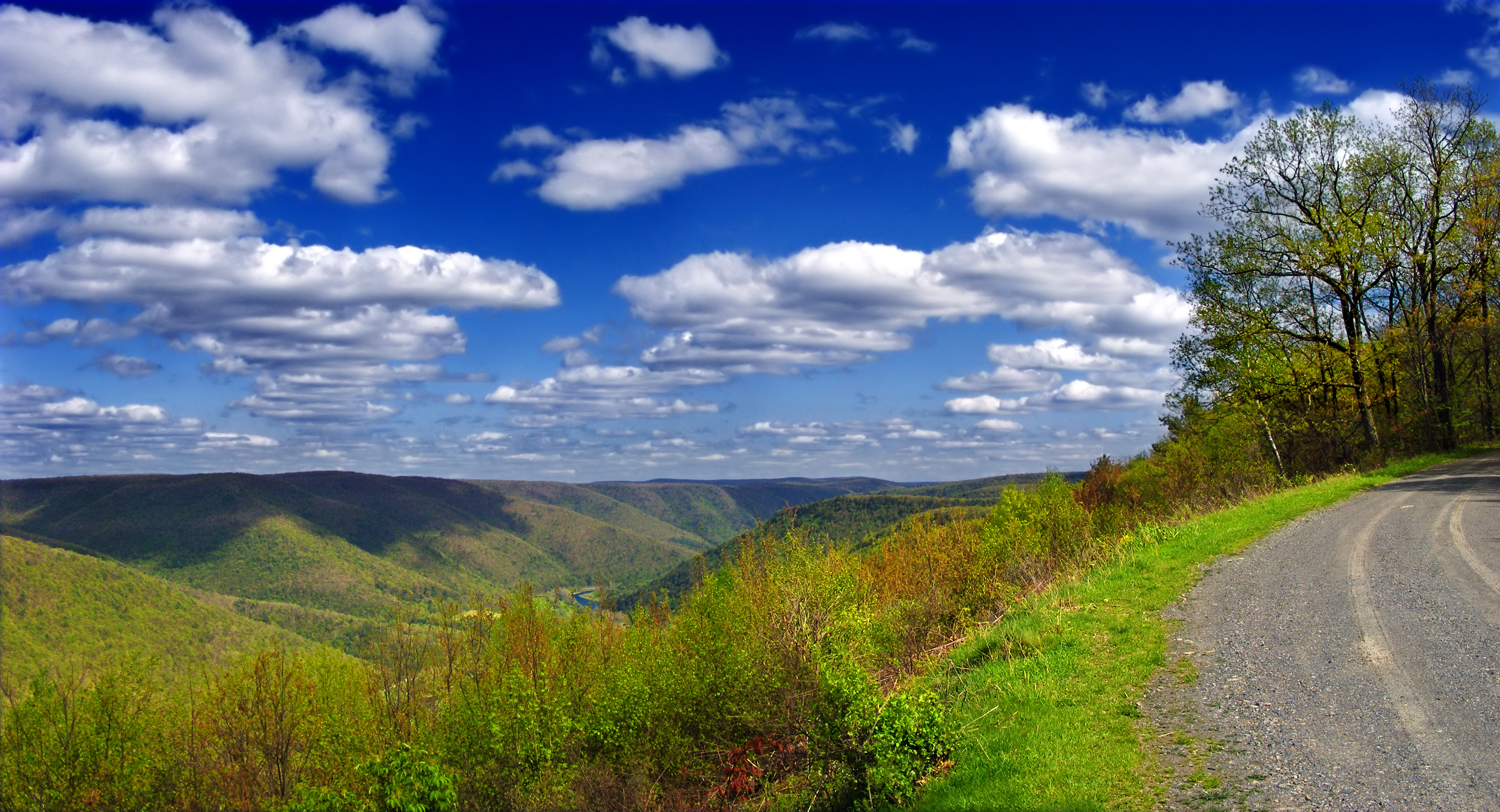
- Pine Creek Gorge

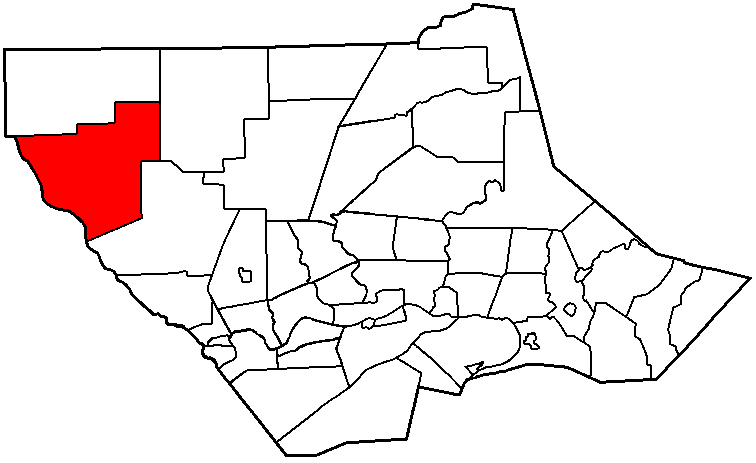
- Map of Lycoming County, Pennsylvania highlighting McHenry Township

- Map of Lycoming County, Pennsylvania
- Coordinates: 41°23′10″N 77°27′12″W
- Country: United States
- State: Pennsylvania
- County: Lycoming
- Settled: 1785
- Incorporated: 1861

Government
  - Type: Board of Supervisors
  - Chairman: Paul W. Hoffmaster II
  - Vice-chairman: Jay F. McCormick, Jr.

Area
  - Total: 76.70 sq mi (198.65 km^{2})
  - Land: 76.22 sq mi (197.41 km^{2})
  - Water: 0.48 sq mi (1.24 km^{2})
- Elevation: 1,896 ft (578 m)

Population (2020)
  - Total: 121 ▼
  - Estimate (2021): 121
  - Density: 1.8/sq mi (0.7/km^{2})
- Time zone: UTC-5 (Eastern (EST))
  - Summer (DST): UTC-4 (EDT)
- FIPS code: 42-081-46184
- GNIS feature ID: 1216757

McHenry Township is a township in Lycoming County, Pennsylvania, United States. The population was 121 at the 2020 census. It is part of the Williamsport Metropolitan Statistical Area.

== History ==
McHenry Township was formed from parts of Cummings and Brown townships on August 21, 1861. It was named in honor of a Jersey Shore surveyor, Alexander H. McHenry.

The first warrant for land in what is now McHenry Township was issued to John Nixon on May 17, 1785. John English and his wife, Fanny Boatman, settled on the largest island in the area as early as 1784. They left hurriedly after a warning from a friendly Indian, Shawnee John, returning about a year later. Claudius Boatman and his son-in-law, Comfort Wanzer, married to Mary "Polly" Boatman, settled in the area in 1785. Boatman, a Frenchman by birth, formerly lived in the Buffalo Valley area of Union County, Pennsylvania, near Winfield, then in Mahoning Township in Montour County, before moving further up the West Branch Susquehanna River to Pine Creek. Boatman, at that time married to his second wife, Esther, had a rather large family. A daughter, Rebecca, married and lived a long life despite being partially scalped when she was 15 in 1782; her mother, Boatman's first wife, was killed in the same incident. Esther Boatman served as a nurse and rural physician for the pioneers along Pine Creek. The descendants of Claudius Boatman remain in fairly large numbers in western Lycoming County.

The first white settlers in the vicinity of what became Jersey Mills arrived in the late 18th and very early 19th centuries. For the next 100 years, lumbering and farming were the main drivers of the local economy. The first lumber mill in the area began operations in 1809. Farm crops included cereal grasses and potatoes. The village of Jersey Mills was officially established in 1855, when its post office opened.

Flagstone quarries in the area provided income in the late 19th and early 20th centuries as lumbering income steeply declined. The village had a one-room school through 1946 and a general store and boarding house through 1965. A smaller general store, the last commercial business in Jersey Mills, operated from 1980 though 2007.

Lumbering was the primary industry in McHenry Township during the mid-to-late 19th century. Thousands of acres of old-growth forest were cleared to meet the demands for lumber during the lumber era that swept throughout Pennsylvania. Williamsport, which is 30 miles (48 km) southeast of McHenry Township, was known at the "Lumber Capital of the World". Logs were floated down Pine Creek and into the West Branch Susquehanna River to various sawmills along both streams and in Williamsport.

McHenry Township is a very rural and remote section of Lycoming County. The hills and valleys are now covered with a thriving second growth forest. The population as of the 2010 census was just 143.

== Geography ==
McHenry Township is in northwestern Lycoming County, bordered by Brown Township to the north, Pine Township to the northeast, Cummings Township to the southeast, and three townships in Clinton County to the southwest. Pennsylvania Route 414 follows Pine Creek through the middle of the township, passing through the small communities of Jersey Mills, Bluestone, Cammal, and Ross Siding (listed from south to north). From Cammal, PA-414 leads northeastward 23 miles (37 km) to Morris and south 7 miles (11 km) to Pennsylvania Route 44 near Waterville. PA 44 forms the southwestern border of the township (and the county line); the highway leads southeastward 23 miles (37 km) to Jersey Shore and northwest 48 miles (77 km) to Coudersport. Pennsylvania Route 664 leaves PA-44 in Haneyville in the southern part of the township, leading south 18 miles (29 km) to Lock Haven.

According to the United States Census Bureau, the township has a total area of 76.7 square miles (198.6 km^{2}), of which 76.2 square miles (197.4 km^{2}) are land and 0.46 square miles (1.2 km^{2}), or 0.62%, are water. Pine Creek runs through the center of the township at the bottom of Pine Creek Gorge, with creek elevation ranging from 650 to 710 feet (200 to 220 m) above sea level, and the tops of the canyon walls from 1,800 to 2,100 feet (550 to 640 m).

== Demographics ==
Historical population
Census	Pop.	Note	%±
2010	143		—
2020	121		−15.4%
2021 (est.)	121		0.0%
U.S. Decennial Census

As of the census of 2000, there were 145 people, 79 households, and 42 families residing in the township. The population density was 1.9 people per square mile (0.7/km^{2}). There were 514 housing units at an average density of 6.8/sq mi (2.6/km^{2}). The racial makeup of the township was 97.93% White, 0.69% from other races, and 1.38% from two or more races. Hispanic or Latino of any race were 2.07% of the population.

There were 79 households, out of which 8.9% had children under the age of 18 living with them, 44.3% were married couples living together, 3.8% had a female householder with no husband present, and 46.8% were non-families. 40.5% of all households were made up of individuals, and 21.5% had someone living alone who was 65 years of age or older. The average household size was 1.84 and the average family size was 2.45.

In the township the population was spread out, with 9.0% under the age of 18, 5.5% from 18 to 24, 17.9% from 25 to 44, 34.5% from 45 to 64, and 33.1% who were 65 years of age or older. The median age was 57 years. For every 100 females there were 116.4 males. For every 100 females age 18 and over, there were 120.0 males.

The median income for a household in the township was $25,000, and the median income for a family was $28,750. Males had a median income of $23,571 versus $13,750 for females. The per capita income for the township was $19,269. There were 11.5% of families and 4.2% of the population living below the poverty line, including no under eighteens and none of those over 64.
