= Blackwell, Pennsylvania =

Unincorporated community in Pennsylvania, US

- Unincorporated community
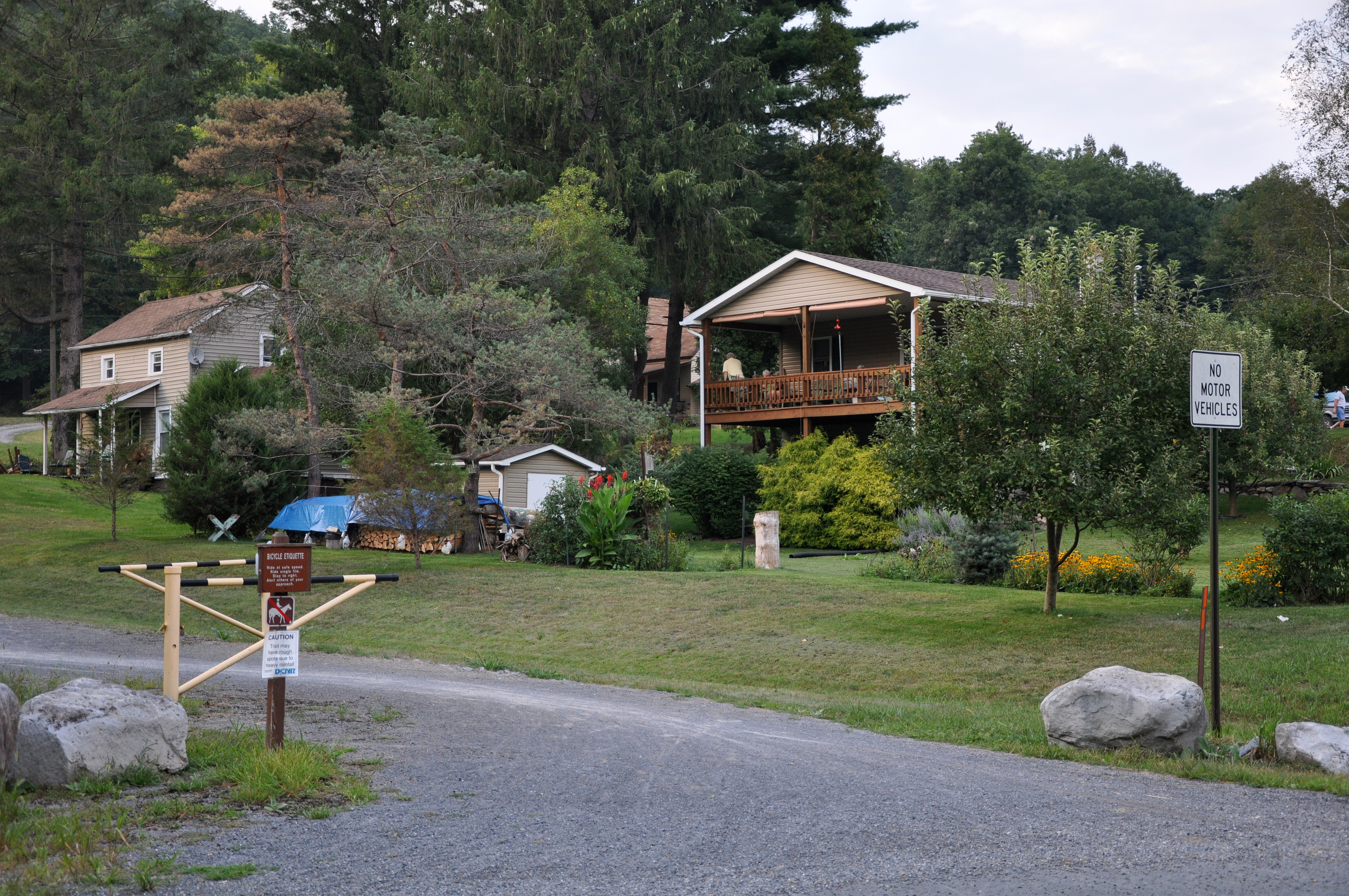
- Houses and rail trail at Blackwell

- Location within Pennsylvania
- Coordinates: 41°33′23″N 77°22′45″W
- Country: United States
- State: Pennsylvania
- County: Tioga
- Elevation: 879 ft (268 m)
- Time zone: UTC-5 (Eastern (EST))
  - Summer (DST): UTC-4 (EDT)
- ZIP: 16938
- Area code: 570
- GNIS feature ID: 1169778

Blackwell is an unincorporated community in Morris Township, Tioga County, in the U.S. state of Pennsylvania. It lies about 6 miles (10 km) southwest of Morris and about 6 miles (10 km) north of Cedar Run along Pennsylvania Route 414. Babb Creek enters Pine Creek at Blackwell, in the Pine Creek Gorge. The Pine Creek Rail Trail passes through Blackwell.
