= Cedar Run, Pennsylvania =

Unincorporated community in Pennsylvania, US

- Unincorporated community
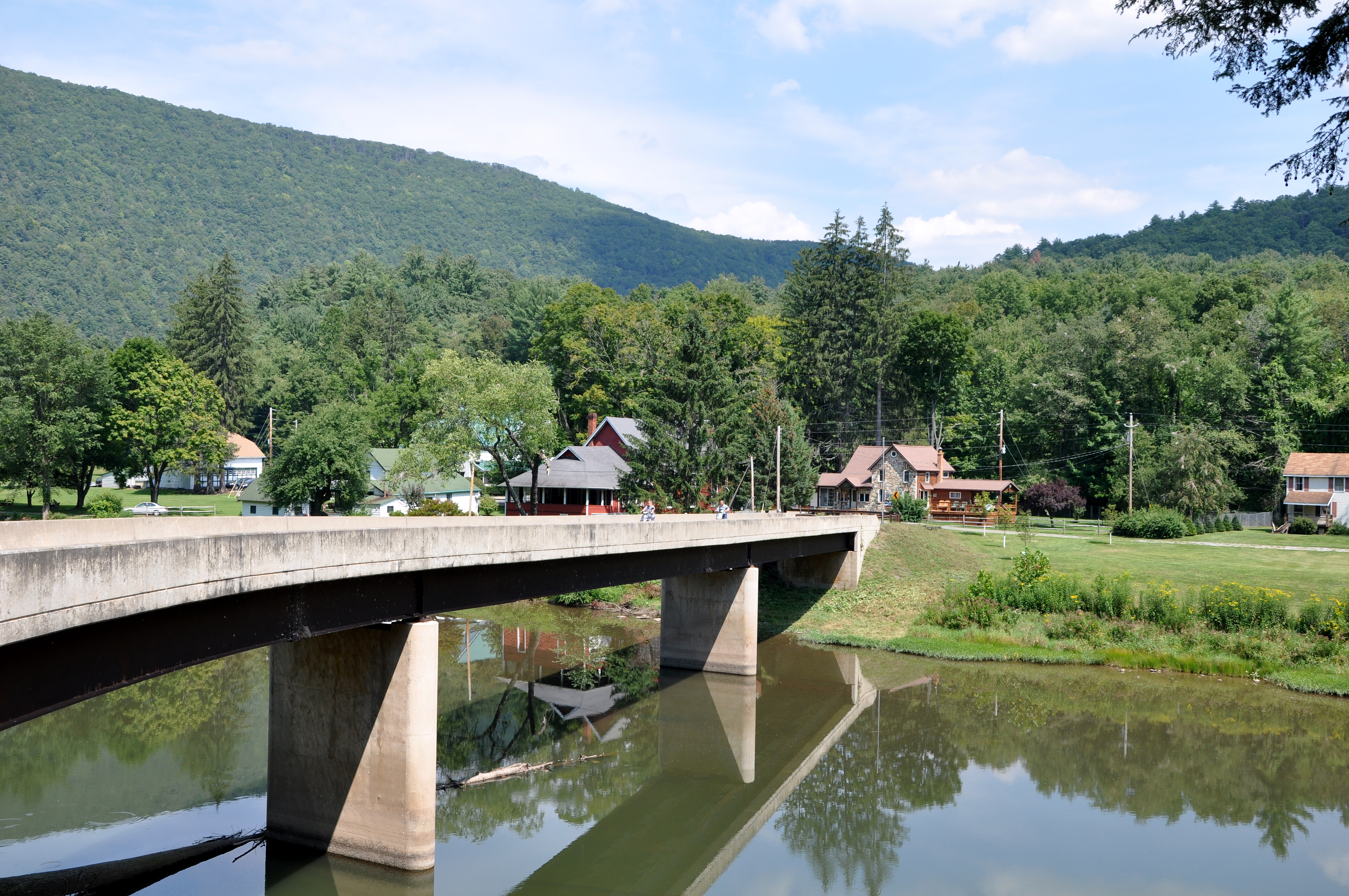
- Bridge over Pine Creek at Cedar Run

- Location within Pennsylvania Location within the United States
- Coordinates: 41°31′21″N 77°26′45″W
- Country: United States
- State: Pennsylvania
- County: Lycoming
- Township: Brown
- Elevation: 837 ft (255 m)
- Time zone: UTC-5 (Eastern (EST))
  - Summer (DST): UTC-4 (EDT)
- ZIP: 17727
- Area code: 570
- GNIS feature ID: 1209292

Cedar Run is an unincorporated community in Brown Township, Lycoming County, Pennsylvania, United States. Cedar Run, a stream with the same name as the community, enters Pine Creek at Cedar Run, in the Pine Creek Gorge. The stream is one of a half-dozen tributaries entering from the western side of Pine Creek, along with nearby Slate Run. The Pine Creek Rail Trail passes through Cedar Run. The village is linked to Pennsylvania Route 414 by a spur road crossing a bridge over Pine Creek.

== History ==
The streams of Cedar Run and Slate Run were significant to the development of the lumber industry in Brown Township in the 1800s. But the abundance of fish and game were as strong a draw for the early settlers as logging. Jacob Lamb is believed to be the first to settle in the area. Lamb hosted church services in his home as early as 1805. Cedar Run had sawmills as early as 1819, and a post office after 1853. The Baptists built a church at Cedar Run in 1849-50 which continues to hold services today. At the height of its prosperity in 1890, Cedar Run had a population of 885. In the 1880s and most of the 1890s, a daily stagecoach carried passengers and freight between the nearby lumbering and tanning village of Leetonia and Cedar Run and its station on the railroad line along Pine Creek.

The Cedar Run Inn and the Cedar Run General Store opened in the early 1890s and remain open in the early 21st century. A nearby Young Men's Christian Association (YMCA) summer camp (Camp Cedar Pines) for boys and girls brought visitors to the area between 1920 and 1946. The last train passed through Cedar Run in 1989, and the tracks were removed. The post office closed in 1993. In the 21st century, a private campground, Pettecoat Junction, is at the north end of the village. And while the mills are gone, Cedar Run still enjoys some of the best fishing in the nation. Pennsylvania Fish and Boat Commission classifies 7 miles of the Cedar Run tributary as Trophy Trout water.
