= Elk Township, Tioga County, Pennsylvania =

Township in Pennsylvania, US

Coordinates: 41°35′00″N 77°30′59″W

- Township
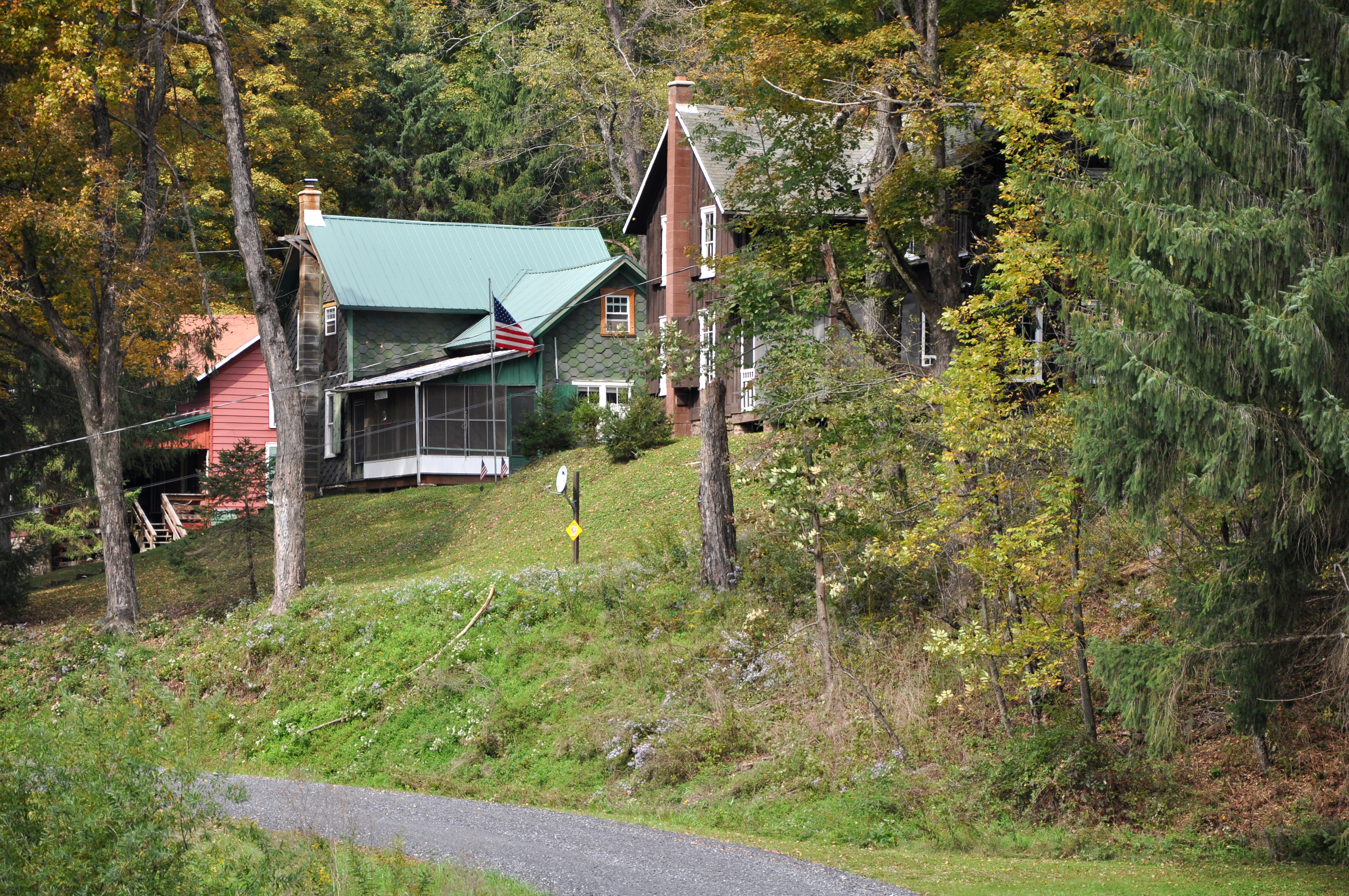
- Houses at Leetonia

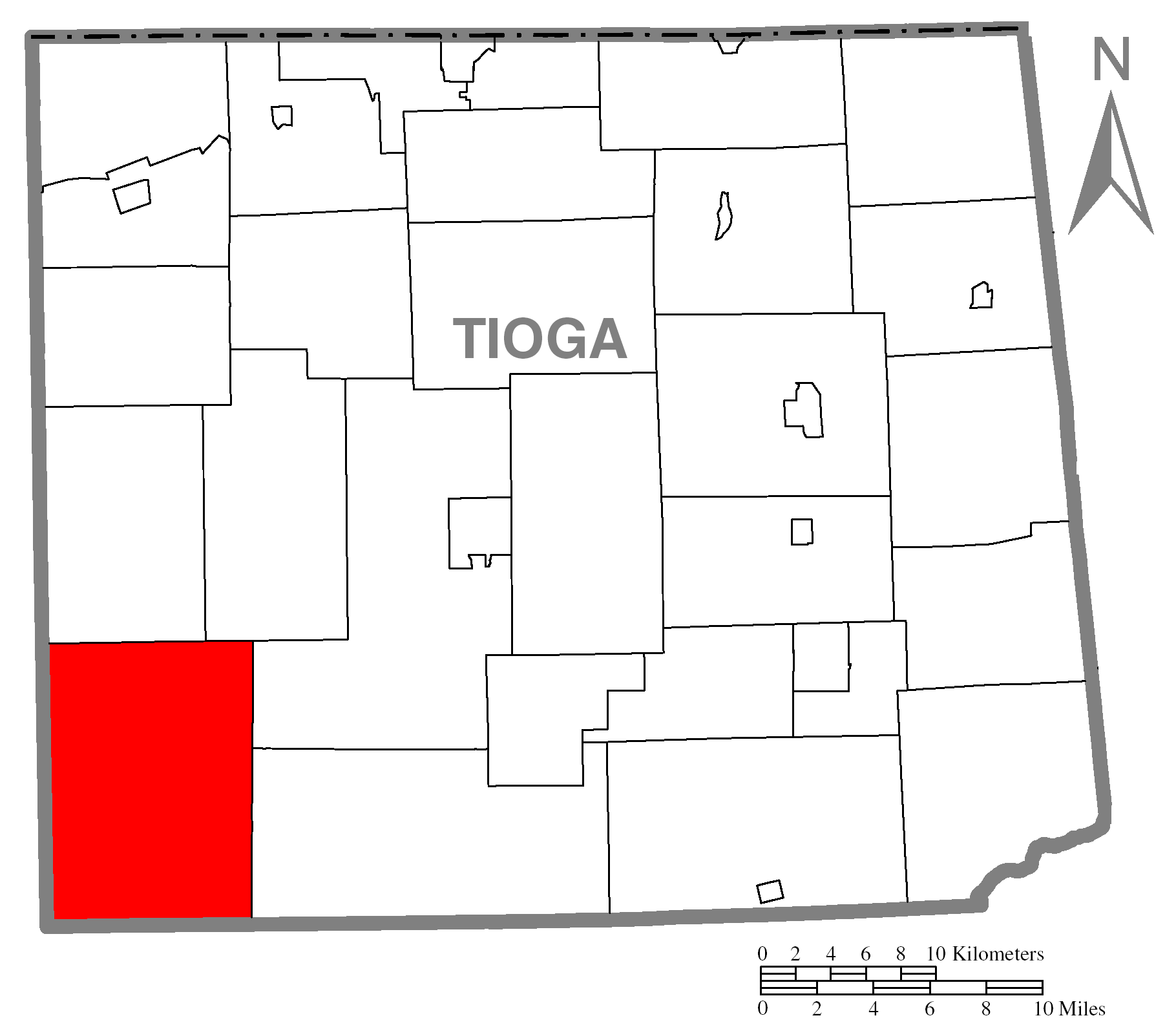
- Map of Tioga County Highlighting Elk Township

- Map of Pennsylvania highlighting Tioga County
- Country: United States
- State: Pennsylvania
- County: Tioga
- Settled: 1799
- Incorporated: 1856

Area
  - Total: 73.93 sq mi (191.48 km^{2})
  - Land: 73.82 sq mi (191.20 km^{2})
  - Water: 0.11 sq mi (0.28 km^{2})

Population (2020)
  - Total: 45 ▼
  - Estimate (2023): 44
  - Density: 0.67/sq mi (0.26/km^{2})
- Time zone: Eastern Time Zone (North America)
  - Summer (DST): EDT
- FIPS code: 42-117-23056

Historical population
Census	Pop.	Note	%±
2000	51		—
2010	49		−3.9%
2020	45		−8.2%
2023 (est.)	44		−2.2%
U.S. Decennial Census

Elk Township is a township in Tioga County, Pennsylvania, United States. The population was 45 at the 2020 census, and 49 at the 2010 census. There were five children under the age of 19 years.

== Geography ==
According to the United States Census Bureau, the township has a total area of 74.0 square miles (192 km^{2}), of which 73.9 square miles (191 km^{2}) is land and 0.1 square miles (0.26 km^{2}) (0.15%) is water.

Elk Township is bordered by Gaines and Shippen Townships to the north, Delmar and Morris Townships to the east, Lycoming County to the south and Potter County to the west.

== Demographics ==
As of the census of 2000, there were 51 people, 24 households, and 18 families residing in the township. The population density was 0.7 people per square mile (0.3/km^{2}). There were 185 housing units at an average density of 2.5/sq mi (1.0/km^{2}). The racial makeup of the township was 100.00% White.

There were 24 households, out of which 12.5% had children under the age of 18 living with them, 66.7% were married couples living together, and 25.0% were non-families. 25.0% of all households were made up of individuals, and 4.2% had someone living alone who was 65 years of age or older. The average household size was 2.13 and the average family size was 2.44.

In the township the population was spread out, with 7.8% under the age of 18, 3.9% from 18 to 24, 19.6% from 25 to 44, 41.2% from 45 to 64, and 27.5% who were 65 years of age or older. The median age was 58 years. For every 100 females there were 112.5 males. For every 100 females age 18 and over, there were 104.3 males.

The median income for a household in the township was $29,583, and the median income for a family was $22,188. Males had a median income of $52,500 versus $0 for females. The per capita income for the township was $18,576. There were 17.6% of families and 11.8% of the population living below the poverty line, including no under eighteens and none of those over 64.

== Communities and locations ==
- Leetonia – A village within the Tioga State Forest in the east-central part of the township.
- Tioga State Forest – The majority of Elk Township is covered by the Tioga State Forest.
