= Brown Township, Lycoming County, Pennsylvania =

Township in Pennsylvania, US

- Township
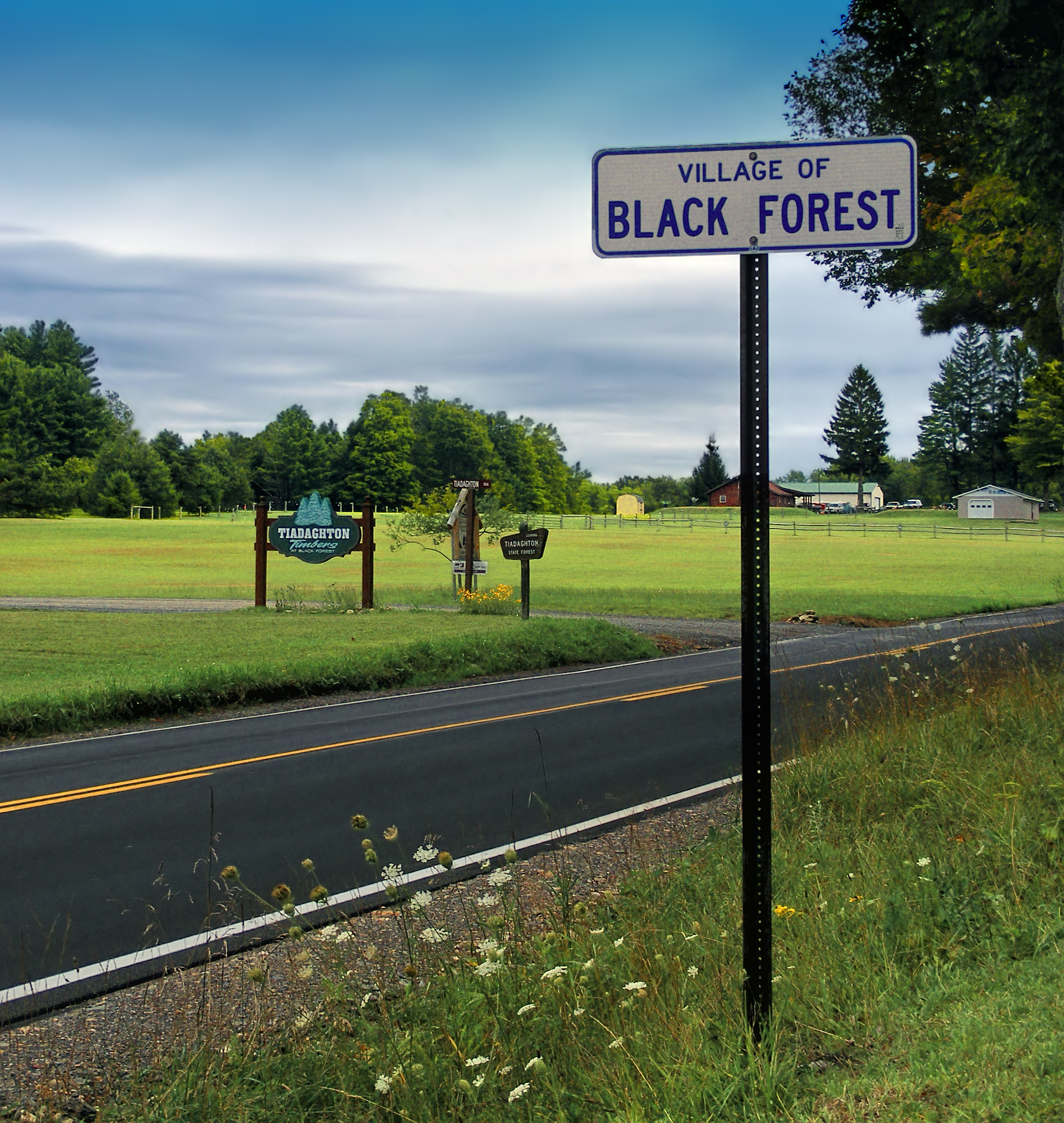
- The village of Black Forest along PA 44

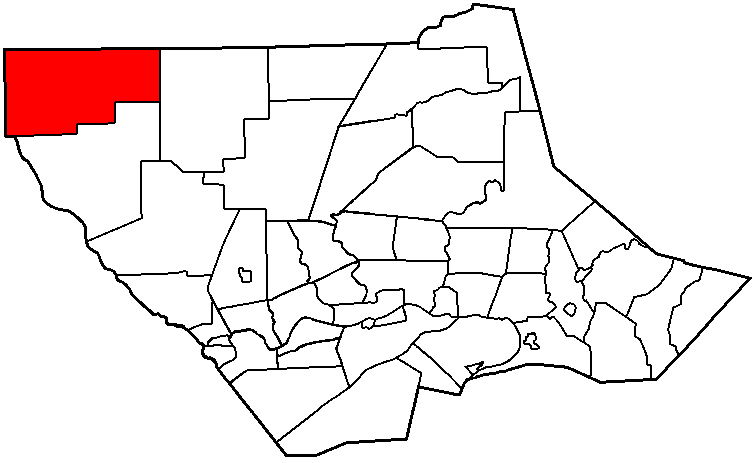
- Map of Lycoming County, Pennsylvania highlighting Brown Township

- Map of Lycoming County, Pennsylvania
- Coordinates: 41°29′30″N 77°30′59″W
- Country: United States
- State: Pennsylvania
- County: Lycoming
- Settled: 1794
- Formed: 1815

Area
  - Total: 74.03 sq mi (191.74 km^{2})
  - Land: 73.34 sq mi (189.96 km^{2})
  - Water: 0.69 sq mi (1.78 km^{2})
- Elevation: 1,988 ft (606 m)

Population (2020)
  - Total: 92 ▼
  - Estimate (2021): 92
  - Density: 1.3/sq mi (0.5/km^{2})
- Time zone: UTC-5 (Eastern Time Zone (North America))
  - Summer (DST): UTC-4 (EDT)
- FIPS code: 42-081-09280
- GNIS feature ID: 1216742

Brown Township is a township in Lycoming County, Pennsylvania, United States. The population was 92 at the 2020 census. It is part of the Williamsport, Pennsylvania Metropolitan Statistical Area.

== History ==
Brown Township, named for Major General Jacob Brown of the War of 1812, was formed on May 3, 1815, by the Court of Quarter Sessions of the Peace of Lycoming County, from parts of Mifflin and Pine townships. Pine Creek and its gorge divide the township nearly in half, and it is the center of history in Brown Township. Pine Creek was a major waterway in the settlement of north-central Pennsylvania and in the lumber era that swept through Pennsylvania in the mid-to-late 19th century. Early pioneers were attracted to its remoteness and abundance of fish and game.

Jacob Lamb, formerly of Milton, was the first documented European descendant to settle in the area. He arrived in late 1794 by paddling with his family and household supplies in ten canoes, up the West Branch Susquehanna River and Pine Creek to the mouth of Slate Run. Here, Lamb built his home. Jacob Lamb also constructed the first saw and gristmills in the area.

Pioneer settler Jacob Tomb and his family established a home, sawmill, and gristmill at the mouth of Slate Run in the 1790s, and others settled nearby along the Pine Creek floodplain. By 1855, the village had a post office, general store, hotel, and two churches.

Driving the local economy toward the end of the century was the James B. Weed and Company hemlock sawmill, which operated in Slate Run from 1886 to 1910 and produced up to 100,000 board feet of lumber a day. After the end of the lumber era, the mill closed, and the village declined in size. However, in the early 21st century, Slate Run still has a general store and post office, and a hotel with a restaurant and bar.

Over the years Brown Township grew slowly, but it never gained a large population. It is largely a remote area, covered with mountains and a thriving second-growth forest. It is popular today with outdoor recreation enthusiasts. The population was 885 by the 1890 census and had declined to 96 people by the 2010 census.

The Bridge in Brown Township was added to the National Register of Historic Places in 1988.

== Geography ==
Brown Township is in the northwestern corner of the county, bordered by Clinton County to the southwest, Potter County to the west, Tioga County to the north, Pine Township to the east and McHenry Township to the south. Pine Creek Gorge cuts through the township from the northeastern corner to the middle of the southern border. The bottom of the gorge rises from 720 feet (220 m) at the southern border to 850 feet (260 m) at the northeast, more than 1,200 feet (370 m) below the surface of the Allegheny Plateau, which has summit elevations ranging from 2,000 to 2,148 feet (610 to 655 m) on the west side and up to 2,200 feet (670 m) on the east.

Pennsylvania Route 44 crosses the western side of the township, on the surface of the Allegheny Plateau, passing through the small village of Black Forest. It leads southeastward 32 miles (51 km) to Jersey Shore in the valley of the West Branch Susquehanna River and northwestward 40 miles (64 km) to Coudersport on the Allegheny River. Pennsylvania Route 414 follows Pine Creek through the township, passing through the village of Slate Run in the bottom of the gorge. PA 414 leads northeastward (upstream) 16 miles (26 km) to Morris and south (downstream) 14 miles (23 km) to PA 44 near Waterville.

According to the United States Census Bureau, the township has a total area of 74.0 square miles (191.7 km^{2}), of which 73.4 square miles (190.0 km^{2}) are land and 0.7 square miles (1.8 km^{2}), or 0.93%, are water. Nearly all of the township drains directly to Pine Creek, which flows south to the West Branch Susquehanna River near Jersey Shore. The far western portion of the township drains west via Baldwin Branch and County Line Creek to Young Womans Creek, which flows southwestward to the West Branch at North Bend. Tiadaghton State Forest occupies much of the township.

== Demographics ==
Historical population
Census	Pop.	Note	%±
2010	96		—
2020	92		−4.2%
2021 (est.)	92		0.0%
U.S. Decennial Census

As of the census of 2000, there were 111 people, 56 households, and 38 families residing in the township. The population density was 1.5 people per square mile (0.6/km^{2}). There were 353 housing units at an average density of 4.8/sq mi (1.9/km^{2}). The racial makeup of the township was 100.00% White.

There were 56 households, out of which 10.7% had children under the age of 18 living with them, 64.3% were married couples living together, and 30.4% were non-families. 26.8% of all households were made up of individuals, and 10.7% had someone living alone who was 65 years of age or older. The average household size was 1.98 and the average family size was 2.36.

In the township the population was spread out, with 10.8% under the age of 18, 0.9% from 18 to 24, 16.2% from 25 to 44, 37.8% from 45 to 64, and 34.2% who were 65 years of age or older. The median age was 56 years. For every 100 females there were 122.0 males. For every 100 females age 18 and over, there were 125.0 males.

The median income for a household in the township was $41,250, and the median income for a family was $55,833. Males had a median income of $24,583 versus $16,667 for females. The per capita income for the township was $22,970. There were 5.6% of families and 4.9% of the population living below the poverty line, including no under eighteens and none of those over 64.

== See also ==
For histories of the other townships in Lycoming County see

History of the Townships of Lycoming County, Pennsylvania
