= Slate Run =

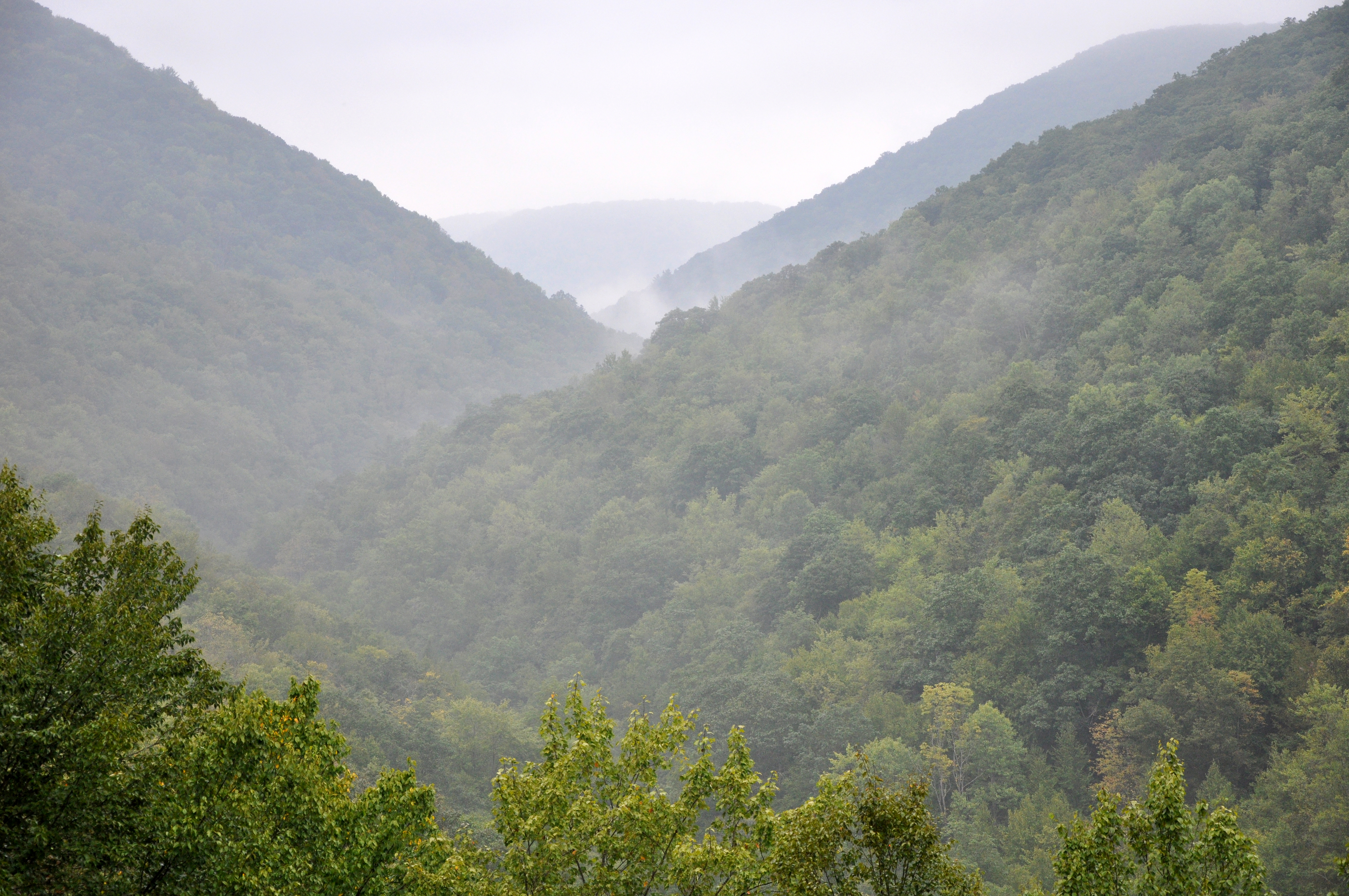
- Slate Run watershed from Francis Road

- Location of the mouth of Slate Run in Pennsylvania

Location
- Country: United States
- State: Pennsylvania
- County: Tioga County, Lycoming County

Physical characteristics
- Source: confluence of Cushman Branch and Francis Branch
  - location: Tioga State Forest, Tioga County
  - coordinates: 41°33′00″N 77°33′14″W
  - elevation: 1,156 ft (352 m)
- Mouth: Pine Creek
  - location: Slate Run, Tiadaghton State Forest, Lycoming County
  - coordinates: 41°28′21″N 77°30′16″W
  - elevation: 732 ft (223 m)
- Length: 7.3 mi (11.7 km)

Slate Run is a 7.3-mile-long (11.7 km) tributary of Pine Creek in Tioga and Lycoming counties, Pennsylvania in the United States.

Formed by the confluence of two of its tributaries, the Francis Branch and the Cushman Branch, Slate Run flows generally southeast to join Pine Creek at the community of Slate Run. The first 0.5 miles (0.8 km) or so of the main stem are in the Tioga State Forest in Tioga County, and the rest passes through the Tiadaghton State Forest in Lycoming County. Named tributaries include Morris Run and Red Run, which enter from the left, and Manor Fork, which enters from the right.

Slate Run, a popular fishery, supports wild brook and brown trout. Fishing is allowed year-round, but anglers are limited to fly fishing with barbless hooks and must return all caught trout to the stream. Other fish in the creek include eastern blacknose dace, longnose dace, slimy sculpins, and white suckers.

== See also ==
- List of rivers of Pennsylvania
