= Cedar Run (Pennsylvania) =

Tributary of Pine Creek

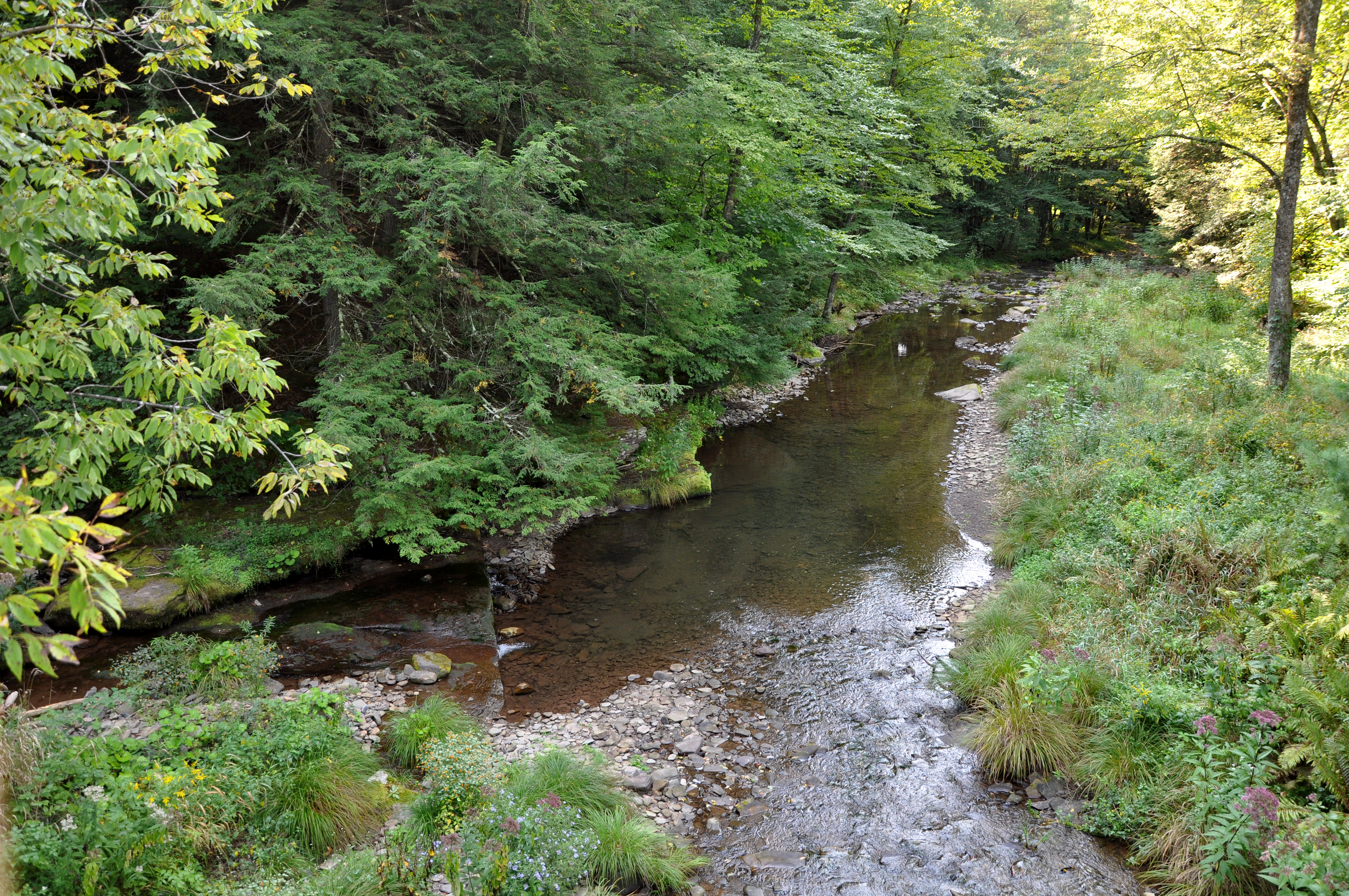
- Downstream from bridge at Mine Hole Run

- Location of the mouth of Cedar Run in Pennsylvania

Location
- Country: United States
- State: Pennsylvania
- County: Tioga County, Lycoming County

Physical characteristics
- Source: near Leetonia
  - location: Tioga State Forest, Tioga County, Pennsylvania
  - coordinates: 41°39′05″N 77°32′08″W
  - elevation: 2,138 ft (652 m)
- Mouth: Pine Creek
  - location: Cedar Run (community), Lycoming County
  - coordinates: 41°31′40″N 77°26′48″W
  - elevation: 784 ft (239 m)
- Length: 11.4 mi (18.3 km)

Cedar Run is an 11.4-mile-long (18.3 km) tributary of Pine Creek in Lycoming and Tioga counties, Pennsylvania in the United States.

Cedar Run joins Pine Creek at the community of Cedar Run.

== See also ==
- List of rivers of Pennsylvania
