= Morris, Pennsylvania =

Unincorporated community in Pennsylvania, US

- Unincorporated community
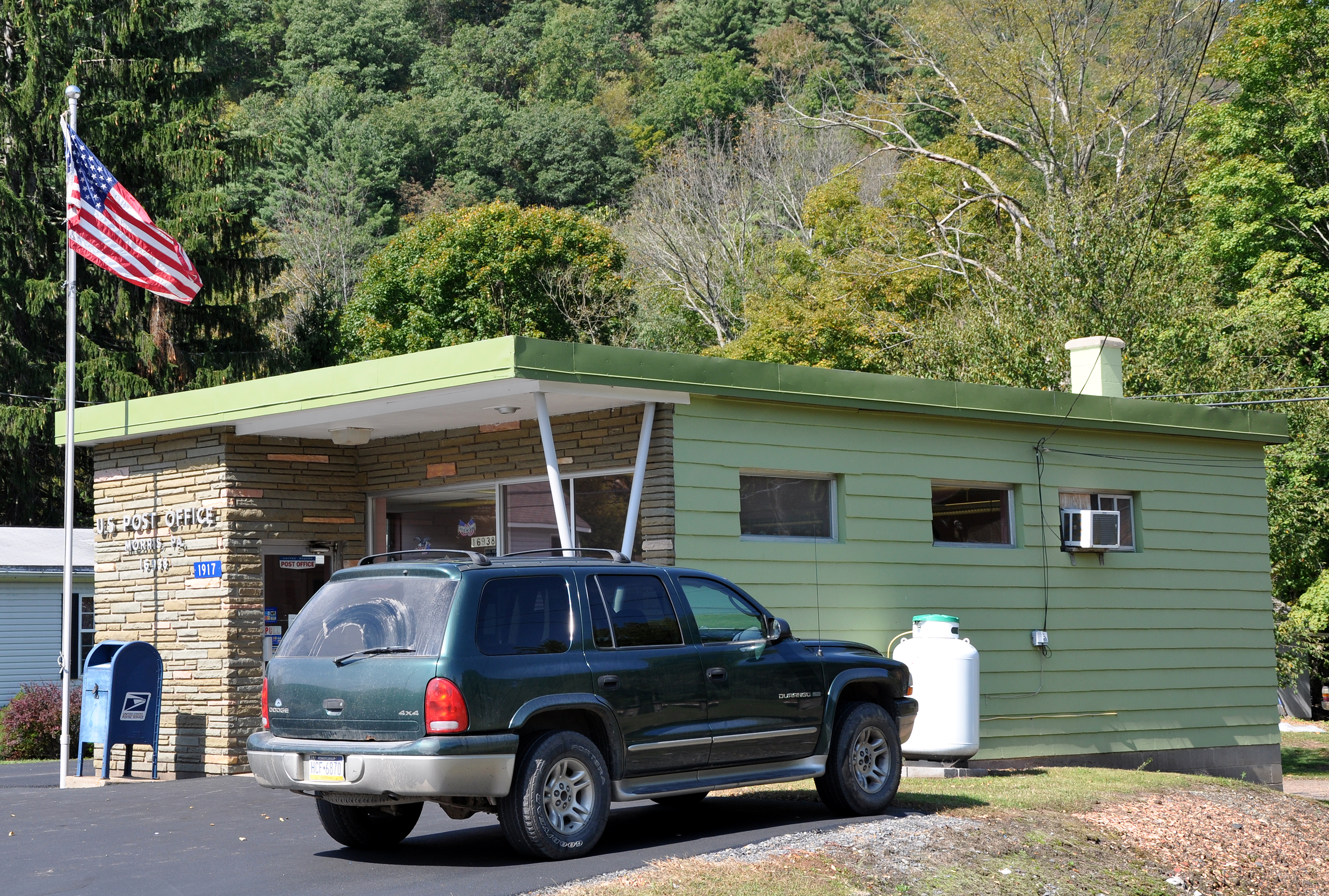
- Morris Post Office

- Location within Pennsylvania
- Coordinates: 41°35′42″N 77°17′32″W
- Country: United States
- State: Pennsylvania
- County: Tioga
- Elevation: 1,037 ft (316 m)
- Time zone: UTC-5 (Eastern (EST))
  - Summer (DST): UTC-4 (EDT)
- ZIP: 16938
- Area code: 570
- GNIS feature ID: 1181566

Morris is an unincorporated community that is located in Morris Township, Tioga County, in the U.S. state of Pennsylvania.

== History and notable features ==
This community lies at the junction of state routes 414 and 287, between Williamsport and Wellsboro. Wilson Creek and Babb Creek, a tributary of Pine Creek, flows through Morris.

Activities in Morris include an annual Rattlesnake Round-Up that features snake hunts. The village is roughly twenty-five minutes by car from the Pine Creek Gorge and the Pine Creek Rail Trail, to the west. Campgrounds in the area—Twin Streams in Morris, Stony Fork Creek near the village of Stony Fork, Leonard Harrison State Park west of Wellsboro, and Pettecote Junction in Cedar Run—offer a variety of sites for tents and recreational vehicles.
