= Pine Creek Gorge =

Valley in Pennsylvania, USA

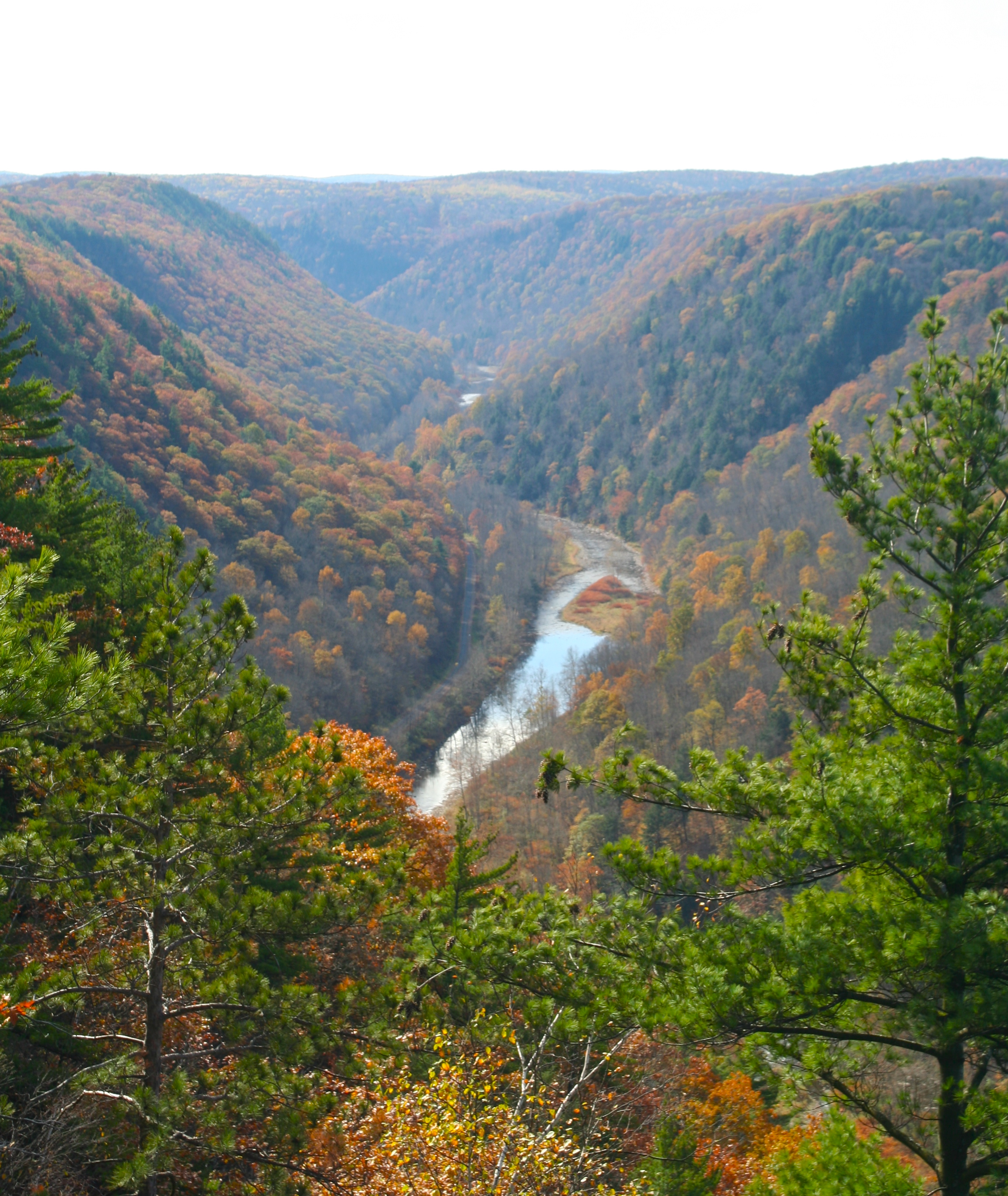
- Pine Creek Gorge in autumn.

- Location within Pennsylvania
- Location: Tioga, Lycoming, and Clinton counties, Pennsylvania
- Nearest city: Waterville
- Coordinates: 41°16′18″N 77°19′37″W
- Designated: 1968

Pine Creek Gorge, sometimes called The Grand Canyon of Pennsylvania, is a 47-mile (76 km) gorge carved into the Allegheny Plateau by Pine Creek in north-central Pennsylvania.

It sits in about 160,000 acres (650 km^{2}) of the Tioga State Forest. The gorge begins south of Ansonia, near Wellsboro, along U.S. Route 6 and continues south. Its deepest point is 1,450 feet (440 m) at Waterville, near the southern end. At Leonard Harrison and Colton Point State Parks, it is more than 800 feet (240 m) deep and the distance rim-to-rim is about 4,000 feet (1,200 m). Recreational resources include the West Rim Trail for hikers and Pine Creek Rail Trail for bikers.

== Formation ==
Pine Creek had flowed northeasterly until about 20,000 years ago, when the receding Laurentide Continental Glacier dammed it with rocks, soil, and other debris. Glacial meltwater formed a lake near the present town of Ansonia, and when it overflowed the debris dam, the creek flooded to the south. Ultimately, it carved a deep channel on its way south to the West Branch Susquehanna River.

== Protected areas ==
The Pine Creek Gorge National Natural Landmark includes Colton Point and Leonard Harrison State Parks and parts of the Tioga State Forest along 18 miles (29 km) of Pine Creek between Ansonia and Blackwell. This federal program does not provide any extra protection beyond that offered by the land owner. The National Park Service's designation of the gorge as a National Natural Landmark notes that it "contains superlative scenery, geological and ecological value, and is one of the finest examples of a deep gorge in the eastern United States."

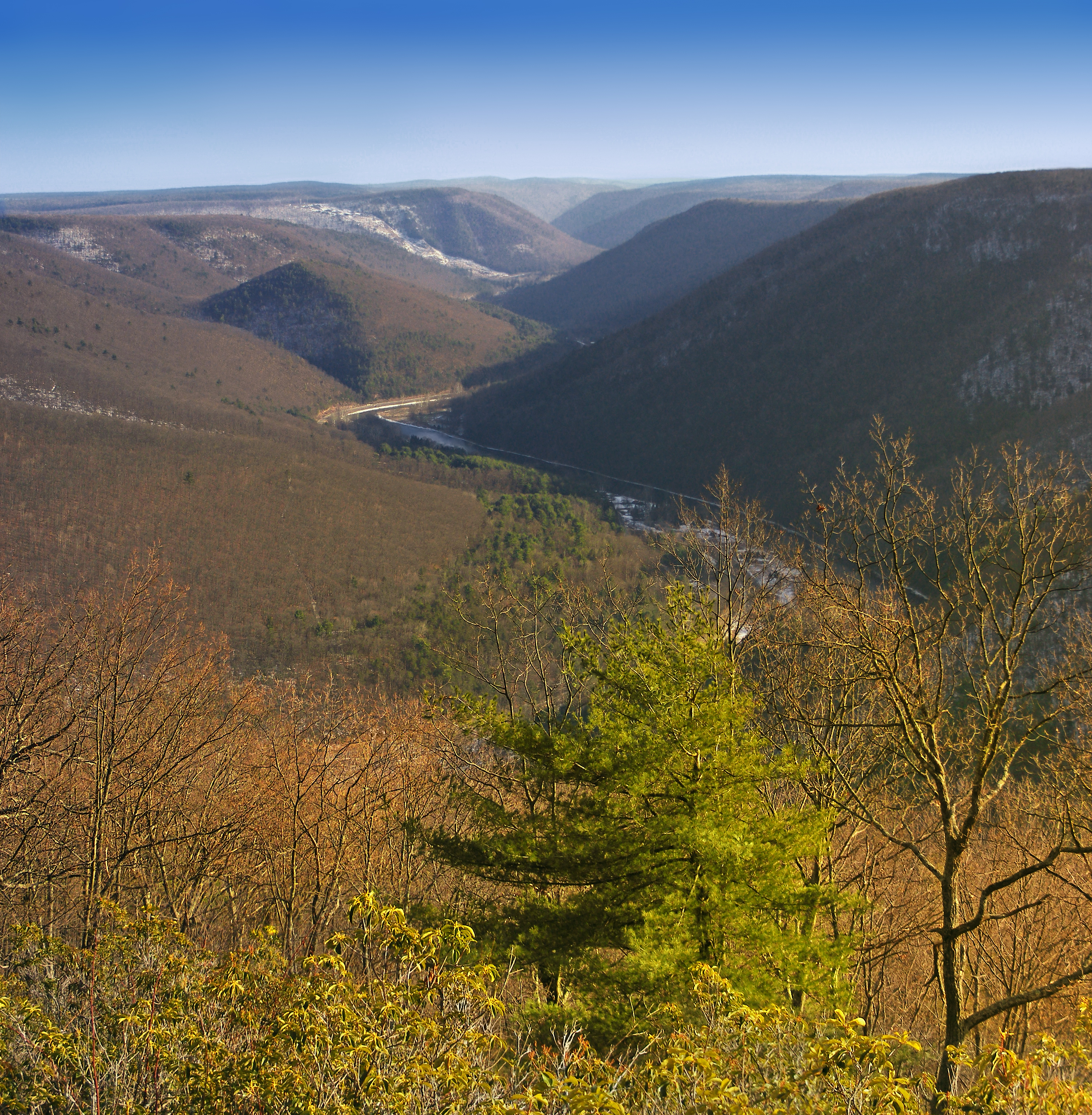
Pine Creek Gorge in Brown Township in the Tiadaghton State Forest

The segment of the gorge between Ansonia and Balckwell, at 18 miles (29 km) long and 2 miles (3.2 km) wide, is also protected by the state of Pennsylvania as the 12,163-acre (4,922 ha) Pine Creek Gorge Natural Area, which is the second largest State Natural Area in Pennsylvania. Within this area, 699 acres (283 ha) of Colton Point and Leonard Harrison State Parks are designated State Park Natural Areas. The state Natural Area runs along Pine Creek from Darling Run in the north (just below Ansonia) to Jerry Run in the south (just above Blackwell).

Within the park, Pine Creek and the walls of the gorge "visible from the opposite shoreline" are also protected by the state as a Pennsylvania Scenic River. In 1968, Pine Creek was one of only 27 rivers originally designated as eligible to be included in the National Wild and Scenic River system, and one of only eight specifically mentioned in the law establishing the program. Before Pine Creek could be included in the federal program, the state enacted its State Scenic Rivers Act, then asked that Pine Creek be withdrawn from the national designation. However, there was much local opposition to its inclusion, based at least partly on mistaken fears that protection would involve seizure of private property and restricted access. Eventually this opposition was overcome, but Pennsylvania did not officially include it as one of its own state Scenic and Wild Rivers until November 25, 1992. The state treated Pine Creek as if it were a state scenic river between 1968 and 1992. It protected the creek from dam-building and water withdrawals for power plants, and added public access points to reduce abuse of private property.

== History ==
=== Native Americans ===
Pine Creek Gorge served as a major route of travel for American Indians. They hiked up and down the gorge for thousands of years to a seasonal hunting camp near Ansonia. Ansonia was named for its founder, Anson Phillips, who built a lumber mill that drew the first settlers to the town.

=== Lumber era ===
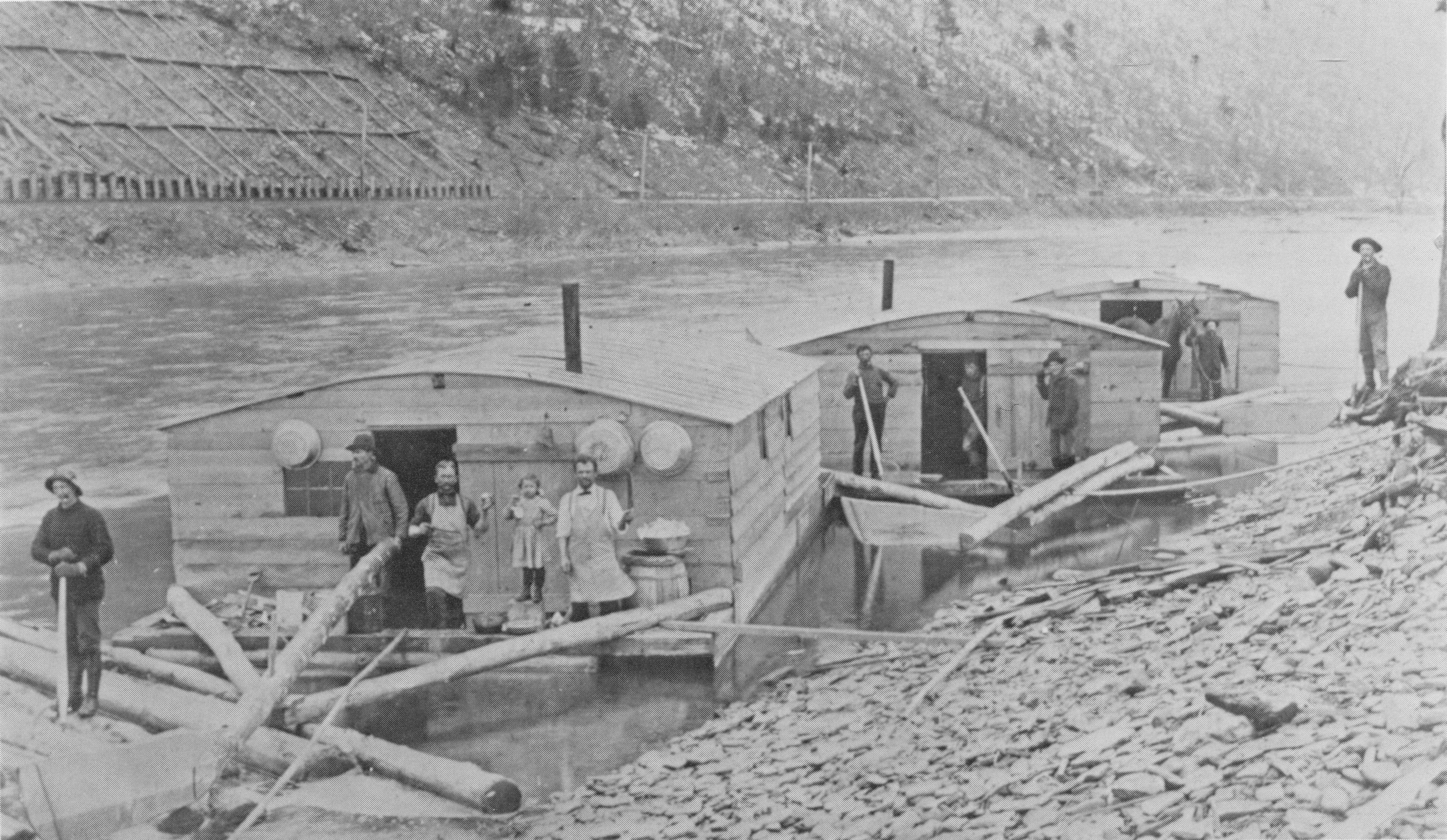
Pine Creek lumber drive, with arks for kitchen and dining (left), sleeping (center), and horses (right): the railroad is on the shore behind.

Before the arrival of William Penn and his Quaker colonists in 1682, up to 90 percent of what is now Pennsylvania was covered with woods: more than 31,000 square miles (80,000 km^{2}) of eastern white pine, eastern hemlock, and a mix of hardwoods. The forests near the three original counties, Philadelphia, Bucks, and Chester, were the first to be harvested, as the early settlers used the readily available timber to build homes, barns, and ships, and cleared the land for agriculture. The demand for wood products slowly increased and by the time of the American Revolution the lumber industry had reached the interior and mountainous regions of Pennsylvania. Lumber thus became one of the leading industries in Pennsylvania. Trees were used to furnish fuel to heat homes, tannin for the many tanneries that were spread throughout the state, and wood for construction, furniture, and barrel making. Large areas of forest were harvested by colliers to fire iron furnaces. Rifle stocks and shingles were made from Pennsylvania timber, as were a wide variety of household utensils, and the first Conestoga wagons.

By the early 19th century, the demand for lumber reached the Pine Creek Gorge, where the surrounding mountainsides were covered with eastern white pine 3 to 6 feet (1 to 2 m) in diameter and 150 feet (46 m) or more tall, eastern hemlock 9 feet (2.7 m) in circumference, and huge hardwoods. Each acre (0.40 ha) of these virgin forests produced 100,000 board feet (240 m^{3}) of white pine and 200,000 board feet (470 m^{3}) of hemlock and hardwoods. For comparison, the same area of forest today produces a total of only 5,000 board feet (12 m^{3}) on average. According to Steven E. Owlett, environmental lawyer and author, shipbuilders considered pine from Pine Creek the "best timber in the world for making fine ship masts", so it was the first lumber to be harvested on a large scale. The original title to the land that became Colton Point State Park was sold to the Wilhelm Wilkins Company in 1792. Pine Creek was declared a public highway by the Pennsylvania General Assembly on March 16, 1798, and rafts of spars were floated down the creek to the Susquehanna River, then to the Chesapeake Bay and the shipbuilders at Baltimore. The lumbermen would then walk home, following the old Pine Creek Path at the end of their journey. A spar sold for one dollar and three spars up to 90 feet (27 m) long were lashed together to make a ship's mast. The largest spar produced on Pine Creek was 43 inches (110 cm) in diameter 12 feet (3.7 m) above the base, 93 feet (28 m) long, and 33 inches (84 cm) in diameter at the top. By 1840, Tioga County alone produced over 452 such spar rafts with more than 22,000,000 board feet (52,000 m^{3}) of lumber.

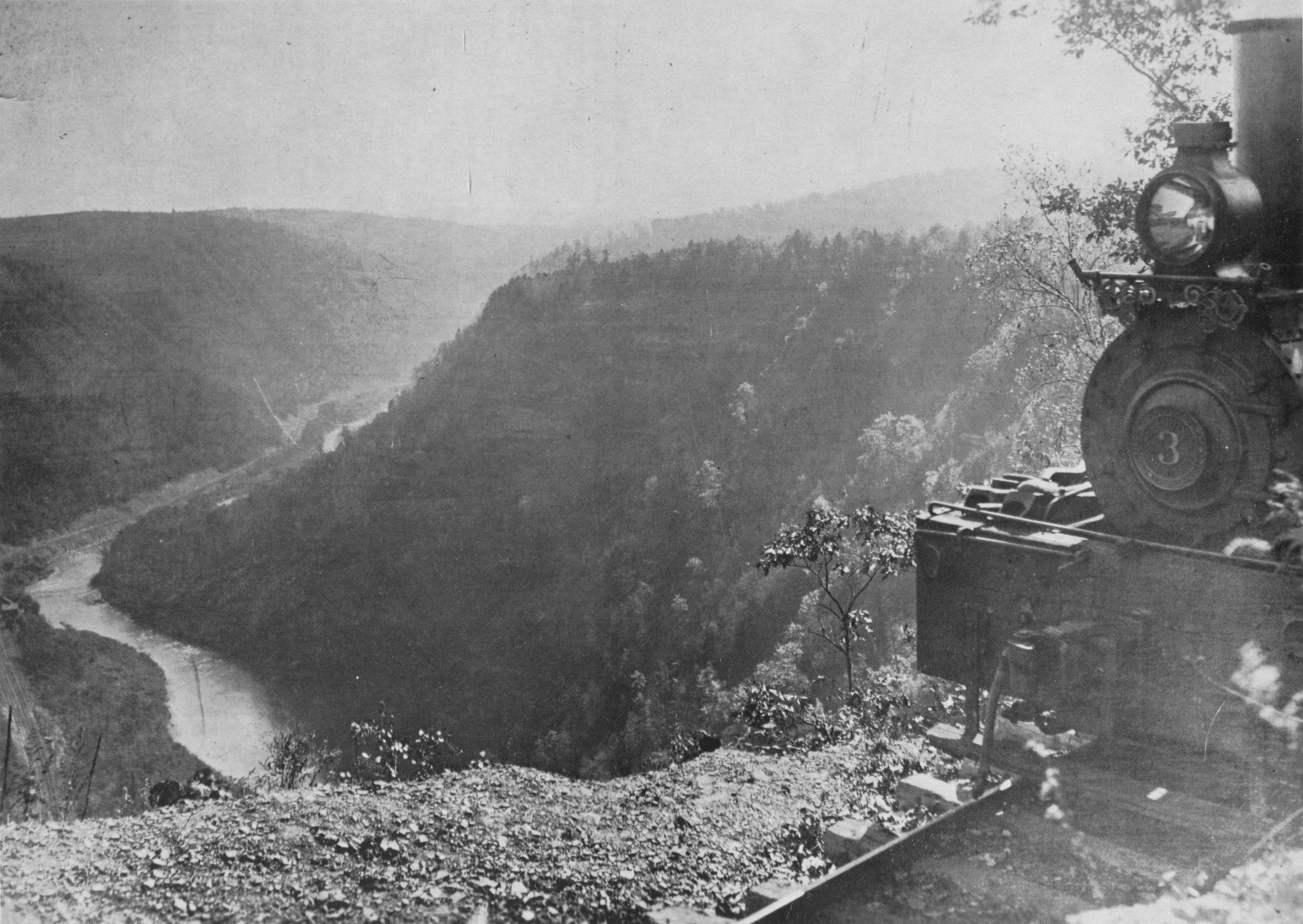
A Shay locomotive from the Leetonia lumber railroad and the nearly clearcut Pine Creek Gorge, at one of the lookouts in what is now the park.

As the 19th century progressed, fewer pines were left and more hemlocks and hardwoods were cut and processed locally. By 1810 there were 11 sawmills in the Pine Creek watershed, and by 1840 there were 145, despite a flood in 1832 which wiped out nearly all the mills along the creek. Selective harvesting of pines was replaced by clearcutting of all lumber in a tract. The first lumbering activity to take place close to what is now Leonard Harrison State Park occurred in 1838 when William E. Dodge and some partners built a settlement at Big Meadows and formed the Pennsylvania Joint Land and Lumber Company. Dodge's company purchased thousands of acres of land in the area, including what is now Colton Point State Park. In 1865, the last pine spar raft floated down the creek, and on March 28, 1871, the General Assembly passed a law allowing splash dam construction and clearing of creeks to allow loose logs to float better. The earliest spring log drives floated up to 20,000,000 board feet (47,000 m^{3}) of logs in Pine Creek at one time. These logs floated to the West Branch Susquehanna River and to sawmills near the Susquehanna Boom at Williamsport. Log drives could be dangerous: just north of the park is Barbour Rock, named for Samuel Barbour, who lost his life on Pine Creek there after breaking up a log jam. Hemlock wood was not widely used until the advent of wire nails, but the bark was used to tan leather. After 1870 the largest tanneries in the world were in the Pine Creek watershed, and required 2,000 pounds (910 kg) of bark to produce 150 pounds (68 kg) of quality sole leather.

In 1879 Henry Colton, who worked for the Williamsport Lumber Company, supervised the cutting of white pine on the land that became the park, which was then owned by Silas Billings. Colton gave his name to the Colton Point overlook on the west rim of the Pine Creek Gorge. Deadman Hollow Road in the park is named for a trapper whose decomposed body was found in his own bear trap there in the early 20th century. Fourmile Run flows through the park: its O'Connor Branch is named for the dead trapper's brothers, who were loggers in the area.

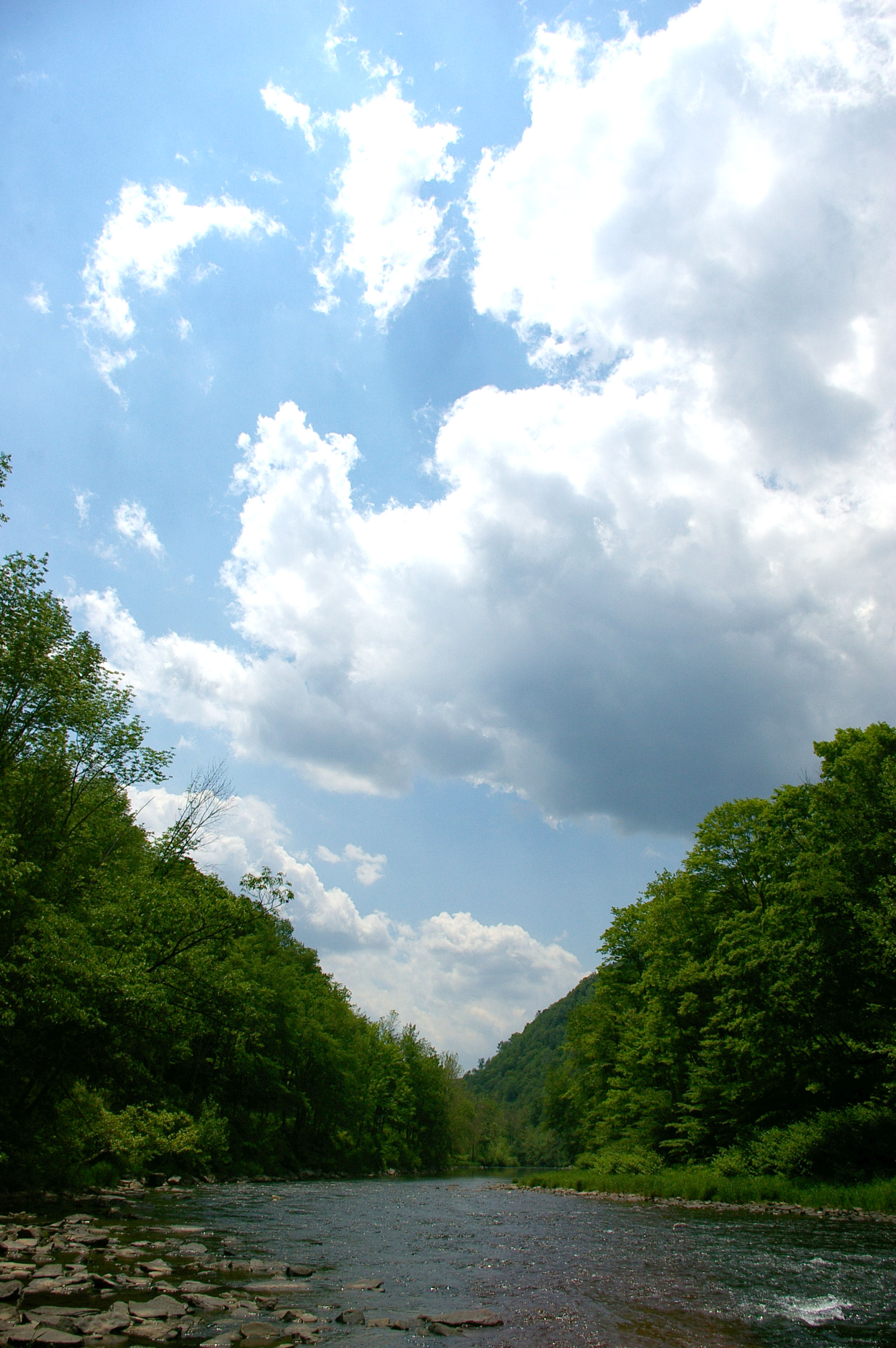
Along Pine Creek between Leonard Harrison and Colton Point state parks a century after the end of the lumber era

In 1883, the Jersey Shore, Pine Creek, and Buffalo Railway opened, following the creek through the gorge. The new railroad used the relatively level route along Pine Creek to link the New York Central Railroad (NYC) to the north with the Clearfield Coalfield to the southwest, and with NYC-allied lines in Williamsport to the southeast. By 1896, the rail line's daily traffic included three passenger trains and 7,000,000 short tons (6,400,000 t) of freight. In the surrounding forests, log drives gave way to logging railroads, which transported lumber to local sawmills. There were 13 companies operating logging railroads along Pine Creek and its tributaries between 1886 and 1921, while the last log drive in the Pine Creek watershed started on Little Pine Creek in 1905. By 1900, the Leetonia logging railroad was extended to the headwaters of Fourmile Run, which has several high waterfalls that prevented logs from being floated down it. In 1903 the line reached Colton Point and Bear Run, which is the northern border of the park today. Lumber on Fourmile Run that had been previously inaccessible was harvested and transported by train, initially to Leonard Harrison's mill at Tiadaghton. When that burned in 1905, the lumber went to the Leetonia mill on Cedar Run in Elk Township.

The old-growth forests were clearcut by the early 20th century and the gorge was stripped bare. Nothing was left except the dried-out tree tops, which became a fire hazard, so much of the land burned and was left barren. On May 6, 1903, the Wellsboro newspaper had the headline "Wild Lands Aflame" and reported landslides through the gorge. The soil was depleted of nutrients, fires baked the ground hard, and jungles of blueberries, blackberries, and mountain laurel covered the clearcut land, which became known as the "Pennsylvania Desert". Disastrous floods swept the area periodically and much of the wildlife was wiped out.

== Recent history ==
Since the end of the lumber era, the forests have re-grown and include trees that are 100 years old. White-tailed deer, beaver, turkeys, black bears, river otters, and bald eagles inhabit these woods.

Visitors can view the gorge and its plants and animals in the state parks and along hiking trails and the Pine Creek Rail Trail. The latter, opened in 1996, runs along the former NYC railroad bed for 64 miles (103 km) from Wellsboro Junction in Tioga County to Jersey Shore in Lycoming County.

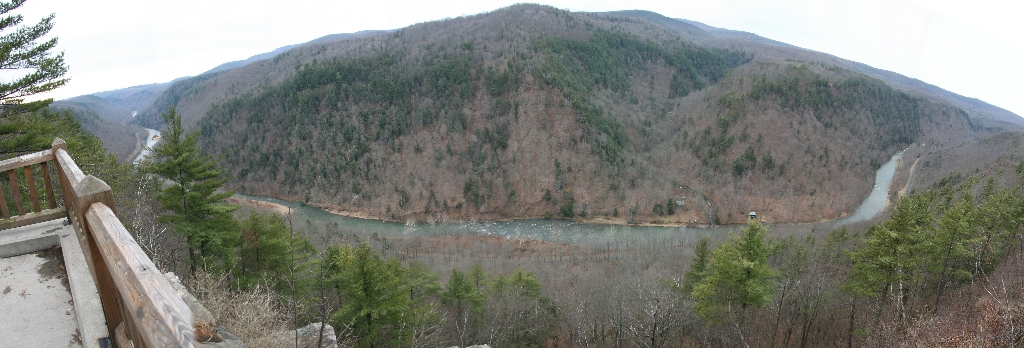
Pine Creek Gorge panorama from Leonard Harrison State Park in Tioga County, Pennsylvania

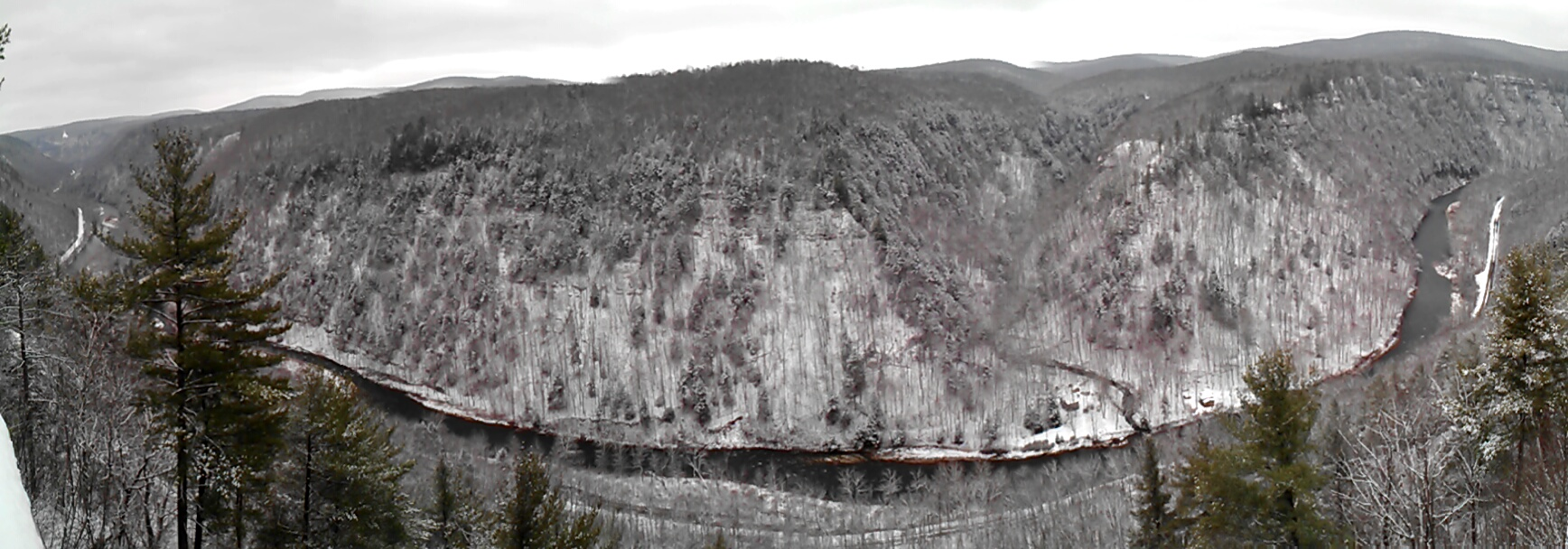
Pine Creek Gorge in the winter

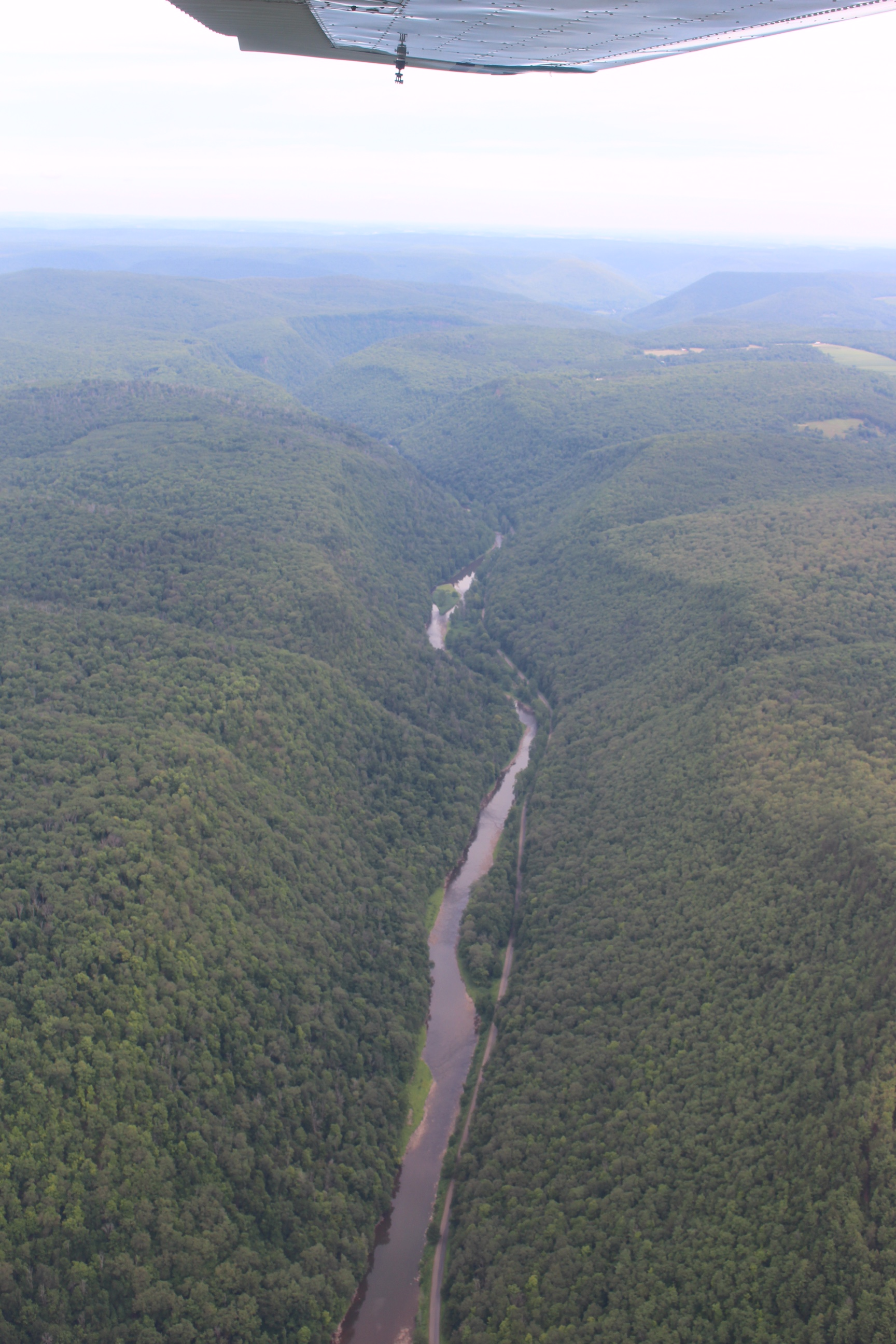
Aerial view of Pine Creek Gorge

== See also ==
- Pine Creek (Pennsylvania)
