= Pennsylvania Route 660 =

State highway in Tioga County, Pennsylvania, US

Pennsylvania Route 660

Route information
- Maintained by PennDOT
- Length: 24.307 mi (39.118 km)
- Existed: 1930–present

Major junctions
- West end: Leonard Harrison State Park in Shippen Township
- PA 362 in Delmar Township; PA 287 in Wellsboro; US 6 from Wellsboro to Charleston Township
- East end: I-99 / US 15 / US 15 Bus. in Richmond Township

Location
- Country: United States
- State: Pennsylvania
- Counties: Tioga

Highway system
- Pennsylvania State Route System; Interstate; US; State; Scenic; Legislative
← PA 655	→ PA 662

Pennsylvania Route 660 (designated by the Pennsylvania Department of Transportation as PA 660) is a 24.1-mile-long (38.8 km) state highway located in Tioga County in Pennsylvania. The western terminus is at the entrance of Leonard Harrison State Park in Shippen Township. The eastern terminus is at Interstate 99 (I-99) in Richmond Township.

== Route description ==
=== Leonard Harrison State Park to Wellsboro ===
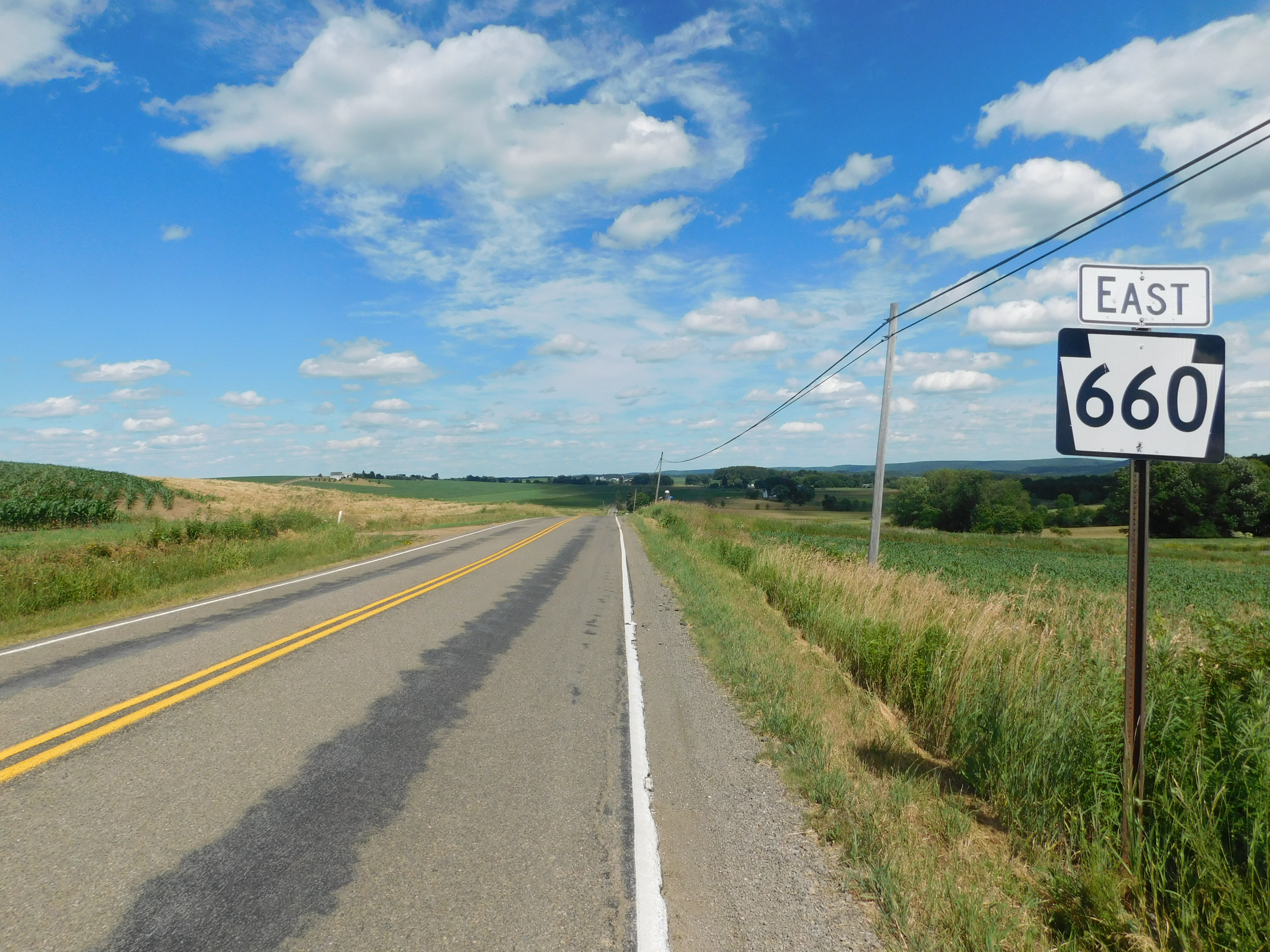
PA 660 east of Leonard Harrison State Park

PA 660 begins at the entrance to Leonard Harrison State Park in Shippen Township. The route proceeds eastward out of the park into Shippen Township, reaching an intersection with State Route 3004 (SR 3004, Snyder Point Road), where the southeast-bound right-of-way is taken over for PA 660. PA 660 makes a short dip into the community of Kennedy, where it turns eastward at an intersection with Wilson Street. The highway makes a long eastward stretch through the rural areas of Tioga County, paralleling SR 3004 for a distance to the south. After the intersection with Martin Road, PA 660 turns northward, intersecting with SR 3004's other terminus, where it turns east along the right-of-way. A short distance later, PA 660 enters Thumptown, a local community in Delmar Township. There, the highway comes to an intersection with SR 3006 (Stony Fork School Road) and SR 3007 (West Branch Road). PA 660 turns to the northeast on the right-of-way once held by SR 3007 and crosses through Delmar Township's rural surroundings before entering the community of Dexter, where PA 660 turns eastward at an intersection with SR 3029 (Airport Road), which connects to PA 362 and Grand Canyon State Airport.

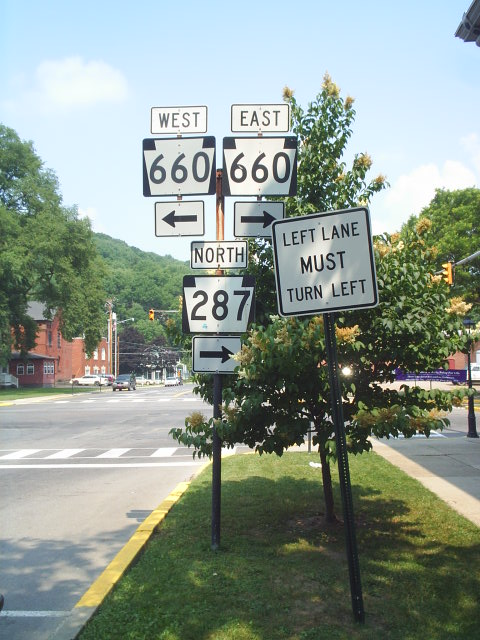
Wellsboro signage for the PA 287 and PA 660 concurrency

Meanwhile, PA 660 crosses through Dexter and continues in a general eastward manner until reaching Morral Road, where it proceeds northeastward once again. At this stretch, some residences appear along the side of the road and soon PA 660 intersects with the western terminus of PA 362, east of the Grand Canyon State Airport in Delmar Township. Like before, PA 660 turns along the right-of-way formerly used by PA 362, and begins crossing through a more developed portion of Delmar Township. Passing to the north of Tioga Country Club, PA 660 gains the moniker of Pinecreek Road before entering the borough of Wellsboro. In Wellsboro, PA 660 changes monikers to West Avenue, crossing through a dense portion of the center of the borough. After curving to the northeast once again at the intersection with Lincoln Street, the moniker changes to Main Street. After passing through more of the commercial district, PA 660 intersects with PA 287 (Central Avenue) in downtown Wellsboro adjacent to the Tioga County Courthouse. The two roads form a short concurrency before intersecting with US 6 (East Avenue). At this intersection, PA 287 proceeds on a concurrency west with US 6, while PA 660 proceeds east on its concurrency with US 6. After the intersection, US 6 and PA 660 head eastward through a more residential portion of Wellsboro. The two highways continue eastward as East Avenue, before proceeding to leave Wellsboro for Charleston Township.

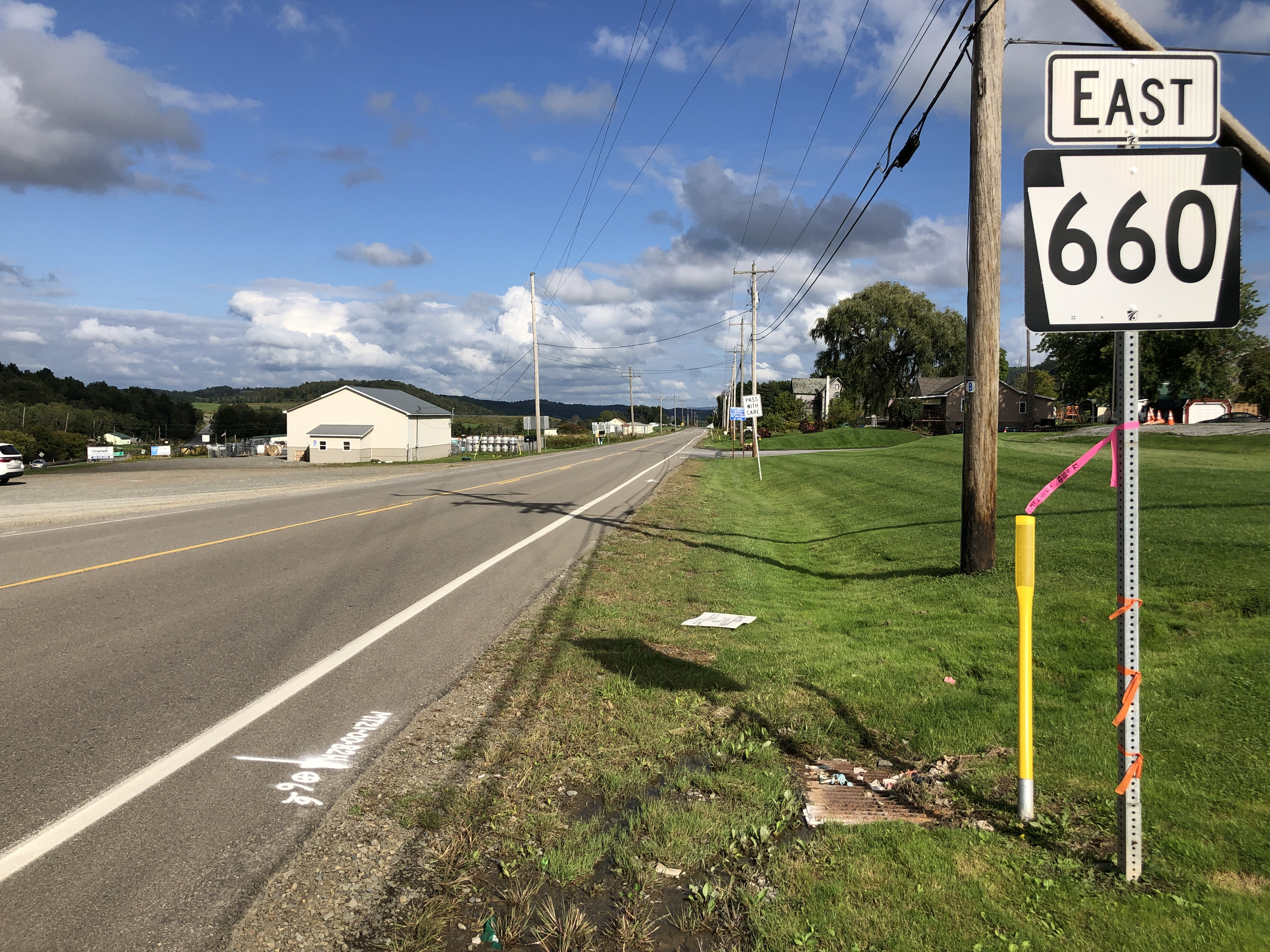
PA 660 eastbound at US 6 in Charleston Township

=== Charleston Township to Richmond Township ===
After leaving Wellsboro for Charleston Township, the moniker switches to Grand Army of the Republic Highway, a name associated with US 6 throughout the United States. The two roads almost immediately enters the hamlet of Pitts, which consists of a few residences and industries at the eastern edges of Wellsboro. US 6 and PA 660 leave Pitts and bend to the northeast through Charleston Township, mainly rural for most of the trip. Both roads pass to the southeast of Dart Settlement and begin a parallel with an old alignment of US 6 through Charleston Township. The old alignment merges in with the newer one at a bend in the highway, which turns eastward for a small strip before turning northeastward once again. At the intersection with Charleston Road in the community of Whitneyville, PA 660 turns eastward from US 6 as North Elk Run Road. For a distance, PA 660 has a parallel with US 6 through fields. Soon after, both roads cross into Richmond Township. The surroundings on PA 660 remain rural while the parallel begins to break at the intersection with Spencer Road, where the highway turns to the southeast. After the intersection with Mack Road, PA 660 enters some dense woods east of the community of Covington.

A short distance after leaving the woods, PA 660 enters Covington. In Covington, PA 660 intersects with the old alignment of US 15 at North Williamson Road. PA 660 turns left onto the old US 15 alignment and passes through a mix of fields and residences as it reenters Richmond Township. This time, entering the community of Canoe Camp, the road crosses the former Erie Railroad Tioga Division right-of-way, and soon enters an interchange with I-99/US 15. This serves as the eastern terminus of PA 660, while US 15 Bus. continues northward into the borough of Mansfield.

== Major intersections ==
The entire route is in Tioga County.

Location	mi	km	Destinations	Notes
Shippen Township	0.000	0.000	Leonard Harrison State Park	Western terminus
Delmar Township	7.486	12.048	PA 362 west – Ansonia	Eastern terminus of PA 362
Wellsboro	10.441	16.803	PA 287 south (Central Avenue) – Morris	West end of PA 287 overlap
Wellsboro	10.633	17.112	US 6 west (East Avenue) / PA 287 north (Main Street) – Tioga, Galeton, Coudersport	West end of US 6 overlap; east end of PA 287 overlap
Charleston Township	16.944	27.269	US 6 east (Roosevelt Highway) – Mansfield	East end of US 6 overlap
Richmond Township	24.307	39.118	I-99 / US 15 / US 15 Bus. north – Mansfield, Williamsport, Corning	Eastern terminus; southern terminus of US 15 Bus.; exit 179 on I-99
1.000 mi = 1.609 km; 1.000 km = 0.621 mi: Concurrency terminus
