= Leonard Harrison =

Leonard or Len(ny) Harrison also refer to:

- Leonard Harrison (businessman)
  - Leonard Harrison State Park
- Leonard Harrison (RAF officer)
- Len Harrison, co-inventor of the flight data recorder
- Lenny Harrison of WMEE
