= Leonard Harrison State Park =

Park in Pennsylvania, US

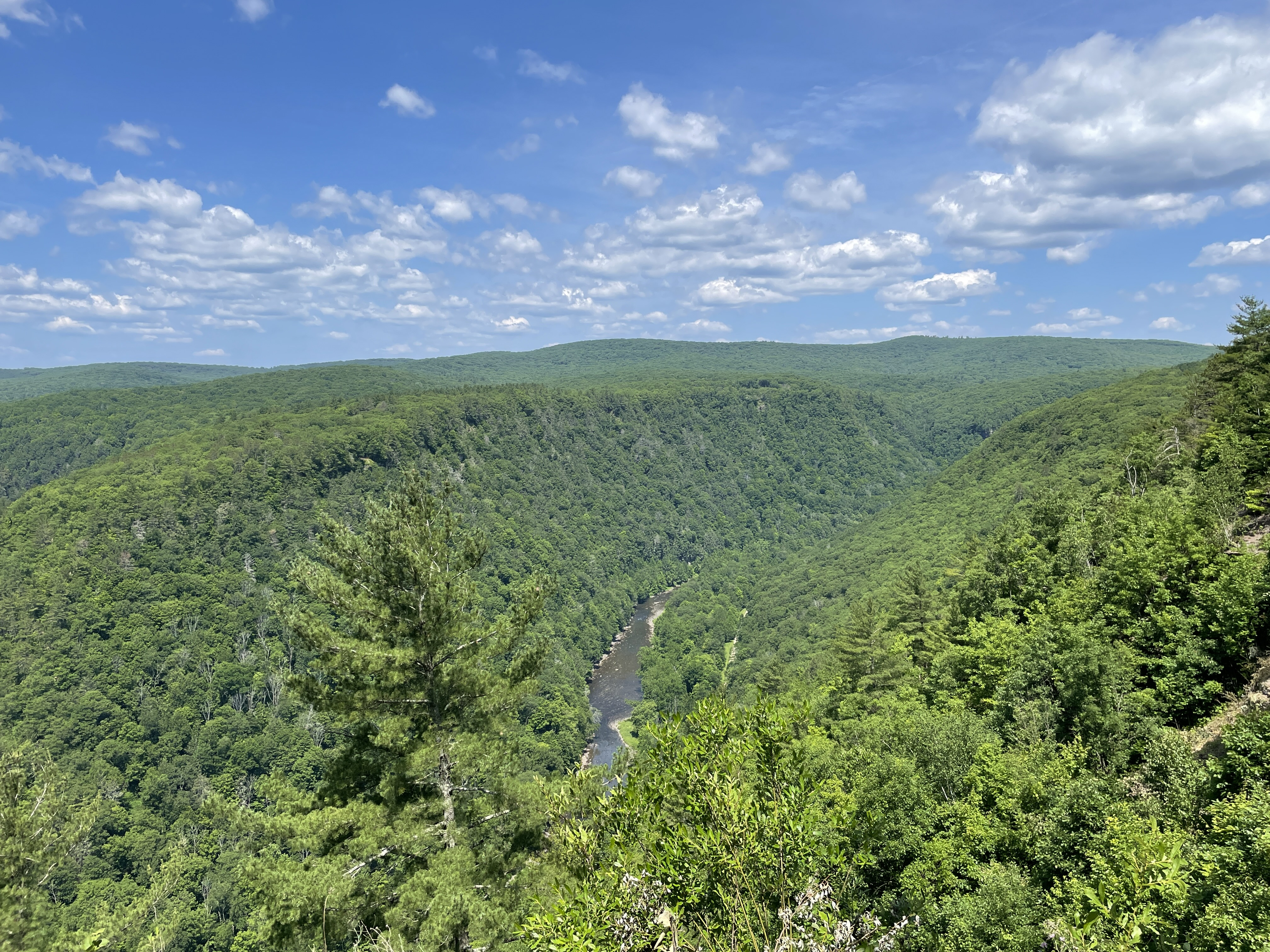
- View north of Pine Creek Gorge, Pine Creek, and Pine Creek Rail Trail from the Leonard Harrison State Park

- Location within Pennsylvania Location within the United States
- Interactive map of Leonard Harrison State Park
- Location: Tioga County, Pennsylvania, United States
- Coordinates: 41°42′30″N 77°27′19″W
- Area: 585 acres (237 ha)
- Elevation: 1,821 feet (555 m)
- Established: 1922
- Administrator: Pennsylvania Department of Conservation and Natural Resources
- Visitors: 142,716 (in 2008)
- Named for: Leonard Harrison
- Website: Official website
- Pennsylvania State Parks

Leonard Harrison State Park is a 585-acre (237 ha) Pennsylvania state park in Tioga County, Pennsylvania, in the United States. It is on the east rim of the Pine Creek Gorge, also known as the Grand Canyon of Pennsylvania, which is 800 feet (240 m) deep and nearly 4,000 feet (1,200 m) across here. It also serves as headquarters for the adjoining Colton Point State Park, its sister park on the west rim of the gorge. Leonard Harrison State Park is known for its views of the Pine Creek Gorge, and offers hiking, fishing and hunting, whitewater boating, and camping. The park is in Shippen and Delmar Townships, 10 miles (16 km) west of Wellsboro at the western terminus of Pennsylvania Route 660.

Pine Creek flows through the park and has carved the gorge through five major rock formations from the Devonian and Carboniferous periods. Native Americans once used the Pine Creek Path along the creek. The path was later used by lumbermen, and then became the course of a railroad from 1883 to 1988. Since 1996, the 63.4-mile (102.0 km) Pine Creek Rail Trail has followed the creek through the park. The Pine Creek Gorge was named a National Natural Landmark in 1968 and is also protected as a Pennsylvania State Natural Area and Important Bird Area, while Pine Creek is a Pennsylvania Scenic and Wild River. The gorge is home to many species of plants and animals, some of which have been reintroduced to the area.

Although the Pine Creek Gorge was clearcut in the 19th and early 20th centuries, it is now covered by second growth forest, thanks in part to the conservation efforts of the Civilian Conservation Corps (CCC) in the 1930s. The park is named for Leonard Harrison, a Wellsboro lumberman who cut the timber there, then established the park, which he donated to the state in 1922. The CCC improved the park and built many of its original facilities. Since a successful publicity campaign in 1936, the park has been a popular tourist destination and attracts hundreds of thousands of visitors each year. Leonard Harrison State Park was chosen by the Pennsylvania Department of Conservation and Natural Resources (DCNR) Bureau of Parks for its "25 Must-See Pennsylvania State Parks" list, which praised its "spectacular vistas and a fabulous view of Pine Creek Gorge, also known as Pennsylvania's Grand Canyon".

== History ==
=== Native Americans ===
Humans have lived in what is now Pennsylvania since at least 10,000 BC. The first settlers were Paleo-Indian nomadic hunters known from their stone tools. The hunter-gatherers of the Archaic period, which lasted locally from 7000 to 1000 BC, used a greater variety of more sophisticated stone artifacts. The Woodland period marked the gradual transition to semi-permanent villages and horticulture, between 1000 BC and 1500 AD. Archeological evidence found in the state from this time includes a range of pottery types and styles, burial mounds, pipes, bows and arrows, and ornaments.

Leonard Harrison State Park is in the West Branch Susquehanna River drainage basin, the earliest recorded inhabitants of which were the Iroquoian-speaking Susquehannocks. They were a matriarchal society that lived in stockaded villages of large longhouses, and "occasionally inhabited" the mountains surrounding the Pine Creek Gorge. Their numbers were greatly reduced by disease and warfare with the Five Nations of the Iroquois, and by 1675 they had died out, moved away, or been assimilated into other tribes.

After this, the lands of the West Branch Susquehanna River valley were under the nominal control of the Iroquois. The Iroquois lived in long houses, primarily in what is now New York, and had a strong confederacy which gave them power beyond their numbers. They and other tribes used the Pine Creek Path through the gorge, traveling between a path on the Genesee River in modern New York in the north, and the Great Shamokin Path along the West Branch Susquehanna River in the south. The Seneca tribe of the Iroquois believed that Pine Creek Gorge was sacred land and never established a permanent settlement there. They used the path through the gorge and had seasonal hunting camps along it, including one just north of the park near what is now the village of Ansonia. To fill the void left by the demise of the Susquehannocks, the Iroquois encouraged displaced tribes from the east to settle in the West Branch watershed, including the Shawnee and Lenape (or Delaware).

The French and Indian War (1754–1763) led to the migration of many Native Americans westward to the Ohio River basin. On November 5, 1768, the British acquired the New Purchase from the Iroquois in the Treaty of Fort Stanwix, including what is now Leonard Harrison State Park. The Purchase line established by this treaty was disputed, as it was unclear whether the border along "Tiadaghton Creek" referred to present-day Pine Creek or to Lycoming Creek, further to the east. As a result, the land between them was disputed territory until 1784 and the Second Treaty of Fort Stanwix. After the American Revolutionary War, Native Americans almost entirely left Pennsylvania, although some isolated bands of Natives remained in Pine Creek Gorge until the War of 1812.

=== Lumber era ===
Prior to the arrival of William Penn and his Quaker colonists in 1682, up to 90 percent of what is now Pennsylvania was covered with woods: more than 31,000 square miles (80,000 km^{2}) of eastern white pine, eastern hemlock, and a mix of hardwoods. The forests near the three original counties, Philadelphia, Bucks, and Chester, were the first to be harvested, as the early settlers used the readily available timber to build homes, barns, and ships, and cleared the land for agriculture. The demand for wood products slowly increased and by the time of the American Revolution the lumber industry had reached the interior and mountainous regions of Pennsylvania. Lumber thus became one of the leading industries in Pennsylvania. Trees were used to furnish fuel to heat homes, tannin for the many tanneries that were spread throughout the state, and wood for construction, furniture, and barrel making. Large areas of forest were harvested by colliers to fire iron furnaces. Rifle stocks and shingles were made from Pennsylvania timber, as were a wide variety of household utensils, and the first Conestoga wagons.

A log raft on Pine Creek

By the early 19th century the demand for lumber reached the Pine Creek Gorge, where the surrounding mountainsides were covered with eastern white pine 3 to 6 feet (0.9 to 1.8 m) in diameter and 150 feet (46 m) or more tall, eastern hemlock 9 feet (2.7 m) in circumference, and huge hardwoods. Each acre (0.4 ha) of these virgin forests produced 100,000 board feet (236 m^{3}) of white pine and 200,000 board feet (472 m^{3}) of hemlock and hardwoods. For comparison, the same area of forest today produces a total of only 5,000 board feet (11.8 m^{3}) on average. According to Steven E. Owlett, environmental lawyer and author, shipbuilders considered pine from Pine Creek the "best timber in the world for making fine ship masts", so it was the first lumber to be harvested on a large scale. Pine Creek was declared a public highway by the Pennsylvania General Assembly on March 16, 1798, and rafts of spars were floated down the creek to the Susquehanna River, then to the Chesapeake Bay and the shipbuilders at Baltimore. The lumbermen would then walk home, following the old Pine Creek Path at the end of their journey. A spar sold for one dollar and three spars up to 90 feet (27 m) long were lashed together to make a ship's mast. The largest spar produced on Pine Creek was 43 inches (110 cm) in diameter 12 feet (3.7 m) above the base, 93 feet (28 m) long, and 33 inches (84 cm) in diameter at the top. By 1840, Tioga County alone produced over 452 such spar rafts with more than 22,000,000 board feet (52,000 m^{3}) of lumber.

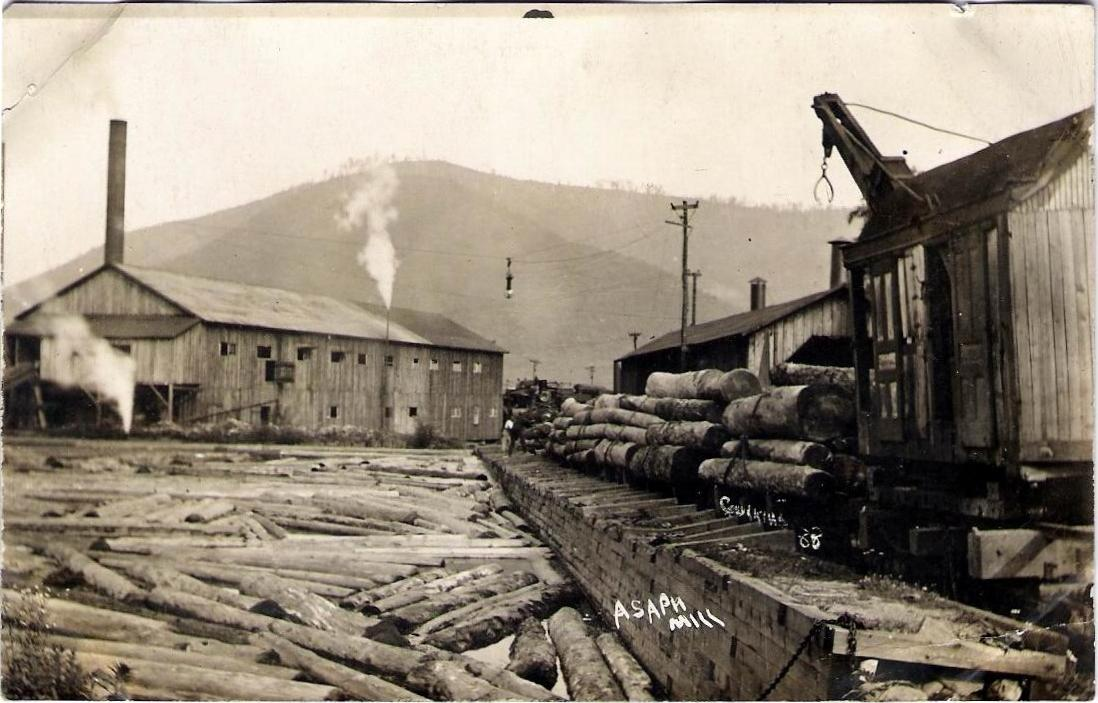
A lumber mill in Asaph, in the Pine Creek watershed – few trees remain on the mountain behind

As the 19th century progressed, fewer pines were left and more hemlocks and hardwoods were cut and processed locally. By 1810 there were 11 sawmills in the Pine Creek watershed, and by 1840 there were 145, despite a flood in 1832 which wiped out nearly all the mills along the creek. Selective harvesting of pines was replaced by clearcutting of all lumber in a tract. The first lumbering activity to take place close to what is now Leonard Harrison State Park occurred in 1838 when William Dodge and some partners built a settlement at Big Meadows and formed the Pennsylvania Joint Land and Lumber Company. Dodge's company purchased thousands of acres of land in the area, including what is now Colton Point State Park. In 1865 the last pine spar raft floated down the creek, and on March 28, 1871, the General Assembly passed a law allowing splash dam construction and clearing of creeks to allow loose logs to float better. The earliest spring log drives floated up to 20,000,000 board feet (47,000 m^{3}) of logs in Pine Creek at one time. These logs floated to the West Branch Susquehanna River and to sawmills near the Susquehanna Boom at Williamsport. Hemlock wood was not widely used until the advent of wire nails, but the bark was used to tan leather. After 1870 the largest tanneries in the world were in the Pine Creek watershed, and required 2,000 pounds (910 kg) of bark to produce 150 pounds (68 kg) of quality sole leather.

In 1883 the Jersey Shore, Pine Creek and Buffalo Railway opened, following the creek through the gorge. The new railroad used the relatively level route along Pine Creek to link the New York Central Railroad with the Clearfield Coalfield. In the surrounding forests, log drives gave way to logging railroads, which transported lumber to local sawmills. There were 13 companies operating logging railroads along Pine Creek and its tributaries between 1886 and 1921, while the last log drive in the Pine Creek watershed started on Little Pine Creek in 1905. The west rim, which became Colton Point State Park, had a logging railroad by 1903, which was able to harvest lumber on Fourmile Run that had been previously inaccessible. The old-growth forests were clearcut by the early 20th century and the gorge was stripped bare. Nothing was left except the dried-out tree tops, which became a fire hazard, so much of the land burned and was left barren. On May 6, 1903, the Wellsboro newspaper had the headline "Wild Lands Aflame" and reported landslides through the gorge. The soil was depleted of nutrients, fires baked the ground hard, and jungles of blueberries, blackberries, and mountain laurel covered the clearcut land, which became known as the "Pennsylvania Desert". Disastrous floods swept the area periodically and much of the wildlife was wiped out.

=== Nessmuk and Leonard Harrison ===
George W. Sears (1821–1890), also known as Nessmuk

George Washington Sears, an early conservationist who wrote under the pen name "Nessmuk", was one of the first to criticize Pennsylvania lumbering and its destruction of forests and creeks. In his 1884 book Woodcraft he wrote of the Pine Creek watershed where

A huge tannery ... poisons and blackens the stream with chemicals, bark and ooze. ... The once fine covers and thickets are converted into fields thickly dotted with blackened stumps. And, to crown the desolation, heavy laden trains of 'The Pine Creek and Jersey Shore R.R.' go thundering [by] almost hourly ... Of course, this is progress; but, whether backward or forward, had better be decided sixty years hence.

Nessmuk's words went mostly unheeded in his lifetime and did not prevent the clearcutting of almost all of the virgin forests in Pennsylvania.

Sears lived in Wellsboro from 1844 until his death in 1890, and was the first to describe the Pine Creek Gorge. He also described a trip to what became Leonard Harrison State Park: after a 6-mile (9.7 km) buggy ride, he then had to hike 7 miles (11 km) through tangles of fallen trees and branches, down ravines, and over banks for five hours. At least he reached "The Point", which he wrote was "the jutting terminus of a high ridge which not only commands a capital view of the opposite mountain, but also of the Pine Creek Valley, up and down for miles". A Pennsylvania Historical and Museum Commission (PHMC) state historical marker commemorating Nessmuk was dedicated in the park in 1972.

Leonard Harrison (1850–1929)

The creation of the park was the work of Leonard Harrison, a former lumberman and businessman from Wellsboro who owned a substantial amount of land in the Pine Creek Gorge. In the 1890s Harrison operated a sawmill at Tiadaghton in the middle of the gorge, which was supplied with logs, not by train as was most common in that era, but by a log slide built into the side of the gorge. The log slide was used on a year-round basis: during the winter the logs slid down on ice; following the snowmelt the slide was greased to ease the descent of the logs. After the village and the mill were destroyed by a fire, Harrison turned his attention to tourism. He purchased 121 acres (49 ha) of land at the site of the current park in 1906, then developed this land, known as "The Lookout", and invited the public to enjoy the beauty of Pine Creek Gorge. Harrison donated the picnic grounds to the Commonwealth of Pennsylvania in 1922.

Although the park was donated to the state, the Wellsboro Chamber of Commerce made initial improvements there and operated it for the first two decades. Elsewhere in the gorge the state bought land abandoned by lumber companies, sometimes for less than $2 per acre ($4.94/ha). Except for the adjoining Colton Point State Park, this land became the Tioga State Forest, which was officially established in 1925 and lies just north and south of the park. As of 2008 the state forest encompasses 160,000 acres (65,000 ha), mostly in Tioga County.

=== Modern era ===
Despite its status as Leonard Harrison State Forest Park, it took time for the park to become more well known. Access to the park over small roads was still difficult. An elderly woman who had lived nearby all her life visited the park for the first time in 1932 and asked, on seeing the gorge, "How long has this been here?"

A statue honoring the Civilian Conservation Corps workers who built many of the facilities in Leonard Harrison and Colton Point State Parks

The Civilian Conservation Corps (CCC) improved access and constructed many of the amenities at Leonard Harrison park from 1933 to 1936, during the Great Depression. Leonard Harrison State Park is one of many examples of the work of the CCC throughout north-central Pennsylvania. The CCC built picnic and comfort facilities, made roads and trails (often following old logging roads), and planted stands of white pine, spruce and larch. Some of the CCC-constructed facilities remain and are still used, and the park has hosted a reunion of former CCC workers each summer since 1990.

In 1936 Larry Woodin of Wellsboro and other Tioga County business owners began a tourism campaign to promote the Pine Creek Gorge as "The Grand Canyon of Pennsylvania". Greyhound Bus Lines featured a view of the canyon from a Leonard Harrison lookout on the back cover of its Atlantic Coast timetable. The bus line's Chicago to New York City tour had an overnight stay in Wellsboro and a morning visit to the canyon for $3. More than 300,000 tourists visited the canyon by the autumn of 1936, and 15,000 visited Leonard Harrison over Memorial Day weekend in 1937. That year more visitors came to the Pine Creek Gorge than to Yellowstone National Park. In response to the heavy use of the local roads, the CCC widened the highways in the area, and guides from the CCC gave tours of the canyon. A PHMC state historical marker honoring the CCC's work in the park and county was dedicated on June 3, 1995. Near the lookout over the gorge there is a bronze statue of a "Tioga County CCC Worker", unveiled on August 14, 1999, as a monument to the achievements of the CCC.

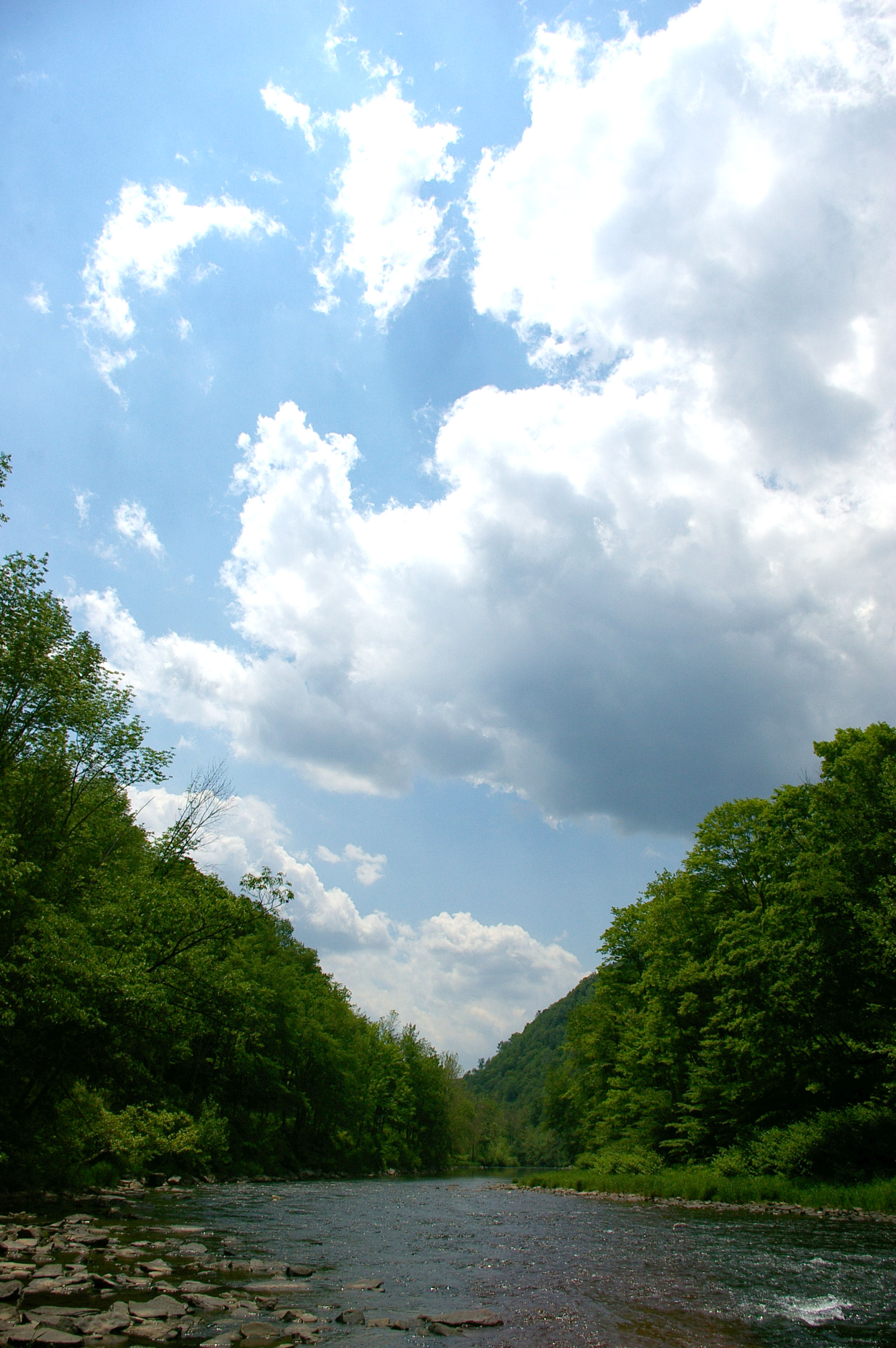
Pine Creek and the bottom of the gorge within the park

After the Second World War the state took over operation of the park, and expanded its size beyond the original land donated by Harrison: six purchases between 1946 and 1949 increased the park's area from 128 acres (52 ha) to 585 acres (237 ha) at a cost of $26,328. The Pennsylvania Geographic Board dropped the word Forest and officially named it Leonard Harrison State Park on November 11, 1954. The park was improved in the following decade with the completion of new latrines (1963) and a new concession stand and visitor center (1968). Pine Creek was named a state scenic river on December 4, 1992, which ensured further protection of Pine Creek Gorge in its natural state. In 1997 the park's Important Bird Area (IBA) was one of the first 73 IBAs established in Pennsylvania. In 2000 the park became part of the Hills Creek State Park complex, an administrative grouping of eight state parks in Potter and Tioga counties. In 2005 the state began a $1.2 million upgrade of park facilities, including a new maintenance building, the replacement of three pit latrines at the overlook and campground, the addition of showers at the campground, and the conversion of all restrooms to flush toilets.

The second half of the 20th century saw great changes in the rail line through the park. Regular passenger service on the canyon line ended after the Second World War, and in 1960 the second set of train tracks was removed. Conrail abandoned the section of the railroad passing through the gorge on September 21, 1988. The right-of-way eventually became the Pine Creek Rail Trail, which follows the path of the former Pine Creek Path. The first section of the rail trail opened in 1996 and included the 1 mile (1.6 km) section in the park: as of 2008 the Pine Creek Rail Trail is 63.5 miles (102.2 km) long.

Leonard Harrison State Park continued to attract national attention in the post-war era. The New York Times featured the park and its "breath-taking views of the gorge" as well as its trails and picnic groves in a 1950 article, and in 1966 praised the whitewater boating on Pine Creek and the park's "outstanding look-out points". The Pine Creek Gorge, including Leonard Harrison and Colton Point State Parks and a 12-mile (19 km) section of Tioga State Forest, was named a National Natural Landmark (NNL) in April 1968. The plaque for the entire NNL is on the lookout terrace of Leonard Harrison State Park. Another New York Times article on whitewater canoeing in 1973 noted the damage along the creek done by Hurricane Agnes the year before, and Leonard Harrison's waterfalls.

In the new millennium, the two state parks on either side of the Pine Creek Gorge are frequently treated as one. A 2002 New York Times article called Leonard Harrison and Colton Point state parks "Two State Parks, Divided by a Canyon" and noted their "overlooks offer the most spectacular views". Leonard Harrison and Colton Point were each included in the list of state parks chosen by the DCNR Pennsylvania Bureau of Parks for its "25 Must-See Pennsylvania State Parks" list. The DCNR describes how they "offer spectacular vistas and a fabulous view of Pine Creek Gorge, also known as Pennsylvania's Grand Canyon". It goes on to praise their inclusion in a National Natural Landmark and State Park Natural Area, hiking and trails, and the Pine Creek Rail Trail and bicycling.

== Pine Creek Gorge ==
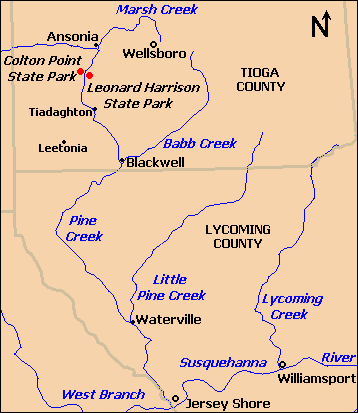
Map showing the park and important locations in its history in the Pine Creek Gorge and Tioga and Lycoming Counties

Leonard Harrison State Park lies on the east side of the Pine Creek Gorge, also known as the Grand Canyon of Pennsylvania. A sister park, Colton Point State Park, is on the west side, and the two parks combined form essentially one large park that includes parts of the gorge and creek and parts of the plateau dissected by the gorge. Pine Creek has carved the gorge nearly 47 miles (76 km) through the Allegheny Plateau in northcentral Pennsylvania. The canyon begins in southwestern Tioga County, just south of the village of Ansonia, and continues south to near the village of Waterville in Lycoming County. The depth of the gorge in Colton Point State Park is about 800 feet (240 m) and it measures nearly 4,000 feet (1,200 m) across.

The Pine Creek Gorge National Natural Landmark includes Colton Point and Leonard Harrison State Parks and parts of the Tioga State Forest along 12 miles (19 km) of Pine Creek between Ansonia and Blackwell. This federal program does not provide any extra protection beyond that offered by the land owner. The National Park Service's designation of the gorge as a National Natural Landmark notes that it "contains superlative scenery, geological and ecological value, and is one of the finest examples of a deep gorge in the eastern United States."

The gorge is also protected by the state of Pennsylvania as the 12,163-acre (4,922 ha) Pine Creek Gorge Natural Area, which is the second largest State Natural Area in Pennsylvania. Within this area, 699 acres (283 ha) of Colton Point and Leonard Harrison State Parks are designated a State Park Natural Area. The state Natural Area runs along Pine Creek from Darling Run in the north (just below Ansonia) to Jerry Run in the south (just above Blackwell). It is approximately 12 miles (19 km) long and 2 miles (3.2 km) wide, with state forest roads providing all of the western border and part of the eastern border.

Within the park, Pine Creek and the walls of the gorge "visible from the opposite shoreline" are also protected by the state as a Pennsylvania Scenic River. In 1968 Pine Creek was one of only 27 rivers originally designated as eligible to be included in the National Wild and Scenic River system, and one of only eight specifically mentioned in the law establishing the program. Before Pine Creek could be included in the federal program, the state enacted its State Scenic Rivers Act, then asked that Pine Creek be withdrawn from the national designation. However, there was much local opposition to its inclusion on the state's list, based at least partly on mistaken fears that protection would involve seizure of private property and restricted access. Eventually this opposition was overcome, but Pennsylvania did not officially include it as one of its own state Scenic and Wild Rivers until November 25, 1992. The state treated Pine Creek as if it were a state scenic river between 1968 and 1992. It protected the creek from dam-building and water withdrawals for power plants, and added public access points to reduce abuse of private property.

== Geology and climate ==
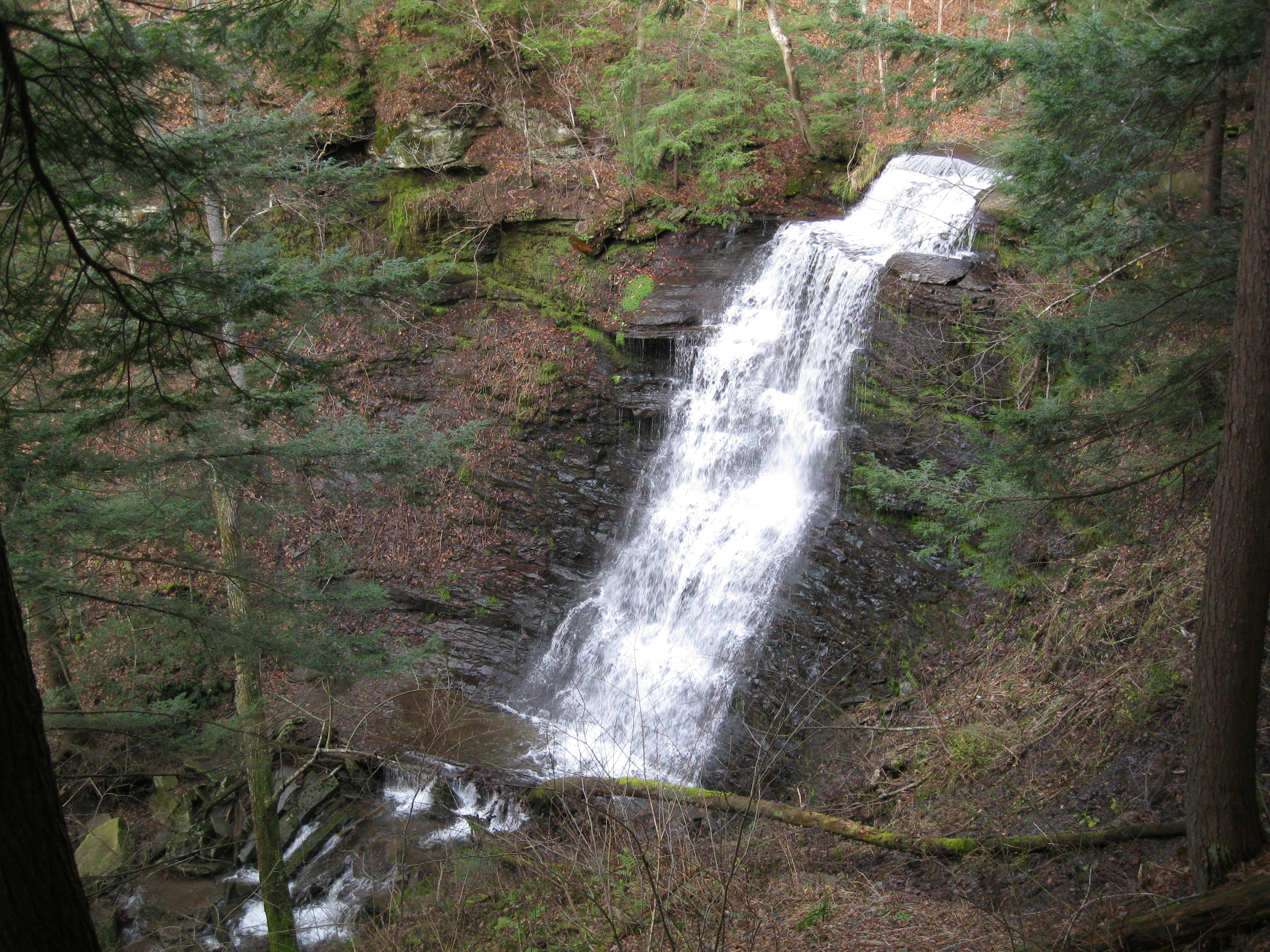
Little Fourmile Run's first waterfall, seen from the Turkey Path, which descends to the bottom of the Pine Creek Gorge.

Although the rock formations exposed in Leonard Harrison State Park and the Pine Creek Gorge are at least 300 million years old, the gorge itself formed only about 20,000 years ago, in the last ice age. Pine Creek had flowed northeasterly until then, but was dammed by rocks, soil, ice, and other debris deposited by the receding Laurentide Continental Glacier. The dammed creek formed a lake near the present village of Ansonia, and the lake's glacial meltwater overflowed the debris dam, which caused a reversal of the flow of Pine Creek. The creek flooded to the south and quickly carved a deep channel on its way to the West Branch Susquehanna River.

The park is at an elevation of 1,821 feet (555 m) on the Allegheny Plateau, which formed in the Alleghenian orogeny some 300 million years ago, when Gondwana (specifically what became Africa) and what became North America collided, forming Pangaea. While the gorge and its surroundings appear mountainous, these are not true mountains: instead years of erosion have made this a dissected plateau, causing the "mountainous" terrain seen today. The hardest of the ancient rocks are on top of the ridges, while the softer rocks eroded away forming the valleys.

The land on which Leonard Harrison State Park sits has undergone tremendous change over the last 400 million years. It was once part of the coastline of a shallow sea that covered a great portion of what is now North America. The high mountains to the east of the sea gradually eroded, causing a buildup of sediment made up primarily of clay, sand and gravel. Tremendous pressure on the sediment caused the formation of the rocks that are found today in the Pine Creek drainage basin: sandstone, shale, conglomerates, limestone, and coal.

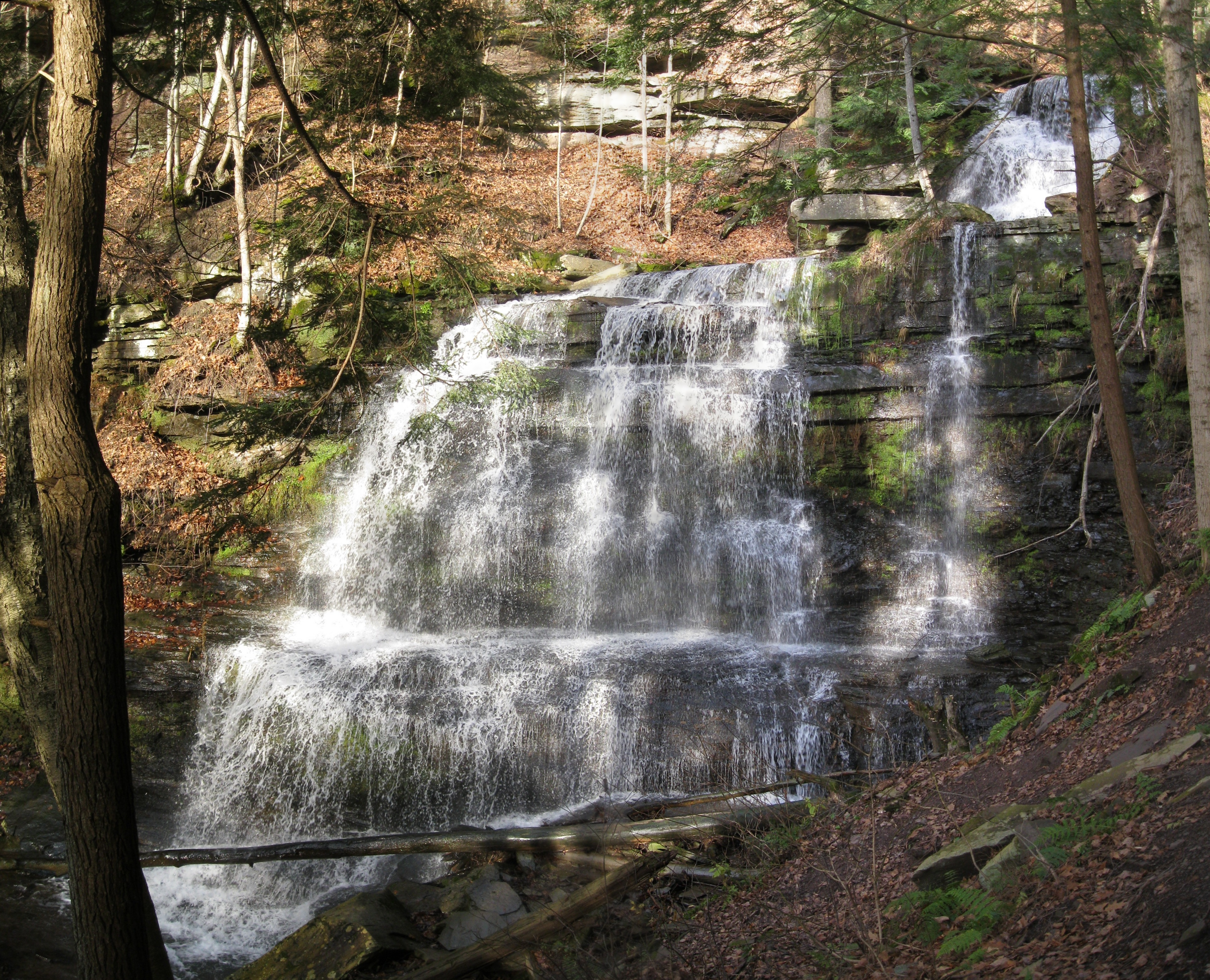
The second waterfall on Little Fourmile Run cascades over layers of ancient rock.

Five major rock formations are present in Leonard Harrison State Park, from the Devonian and Carboniferous periods. The youngest of these, which forms the highest points in the park and along the gorge, is the Pottsville Formation, a gray conglomerate from the early Pennsylvanian that may contain sandstone, siltstone, and shale, as well as anthracite coal. Low-sulfur coal was once mined at three locations within the Pine Creek watershed. Below this is the Mauch Chunk Formation, which is formed with grayish-red shale, siltstone, sandstone, and conglomerate from the late Mississippian. Millstones were once carved from the exposed sections of this conglomerate. Together the Pottsville and Mauch Chunk formations are some 300 feet (91 m) thick.

Next below these is the late Devonian and early Mississippian Huntley Mountain Formation, which is made of grayish-red shale and olive-gray sandstone. This is relatively hard rock and forms many of the ridges. Below this is the red shale and siltstone of the Catskill Formation, about 760 feet (230 m) thick and some 375 million years old. This layer is relatively soft and easily eroded, which helped to form the Pine Creek Gorge. Cliffs formed by the Huntley Mountain and Catskill formations are visible north of the park at Barbour Rock. The lowest and oldest layer is the Lock Haven Formation, which is gray to green-brown siltstone and shale over 400 million years old. It forms the base of the gorge, contains marine fossils, and is up to 600 feet (180 m) thick.

The dominant soil in Leonard Harrison State Park is somewhat excessively drained Oquaga channery loam, which is often associated with well drained Lordstown channery loam. Much of the campground near the eastern boundary is supported by Morris gravelly silt loam, which is somewhat poorly drained due to a subsoil fragipan. The Oquaga tends to be very strongly acidic (pH 4.8), Morris is strongly acidic (pH 5.3) and Lordstown is moderately acidic (pH 5.5). All of these soils belong to the Inceptisol soil order.

The Allegheny Plateau has a continental climate, with occasional severe low temperatures in winter and average daily temperature ranges of 20 °F (11 °C) in winter and 26 °F (14 °C) in summer. The mean annual precipitation for the Pine Creek watershed is 36 to 42 inches (914 to 1,070 mm). The highest recorded temperature at the park was 104 °F (40 °C) in 1936, and the record low was −30 °F (−34 °C) in 1934. On average, July is the hottest month at Leonard Harrison, January is the coldest, and June the wettest.

Climate data for Leonard Harrison State Park
Month	Jan	Feb	Mar	Apr	May	Jun	Jul	Aug	Sep	Oct	Nov	Dec	Year
Mean daily maximum °F (°C)	30 (−1)	33 (1)	41 (5)	54 (12)	65 (18)	73 (23)	77 (25)	76 (24)	68 (20)	58 (14)	45 (7)	34 (1)	55 (12)
Mean daily minimum °F (°C)	13 (−11)	15 (−9)	23 (−5)	33 (1)	43 (6)	52 (11)	56 (13)	54 (12)	48 (9)	38 (3)	30 (−1)	19 (−7)	35 (2)
Average precipitation inches (mm)	1.88 (48)	1.72 (44)	2.40 (61)	2.52 (64)	3.05 (77)	4.56 (116)	3.66 (93)	2.92 (74)	3.23 (82)	2.60 (66)	2.77 (70)	2.12 (54)	33.43 (849)
Source: The Weather Channel

== Ecology ==
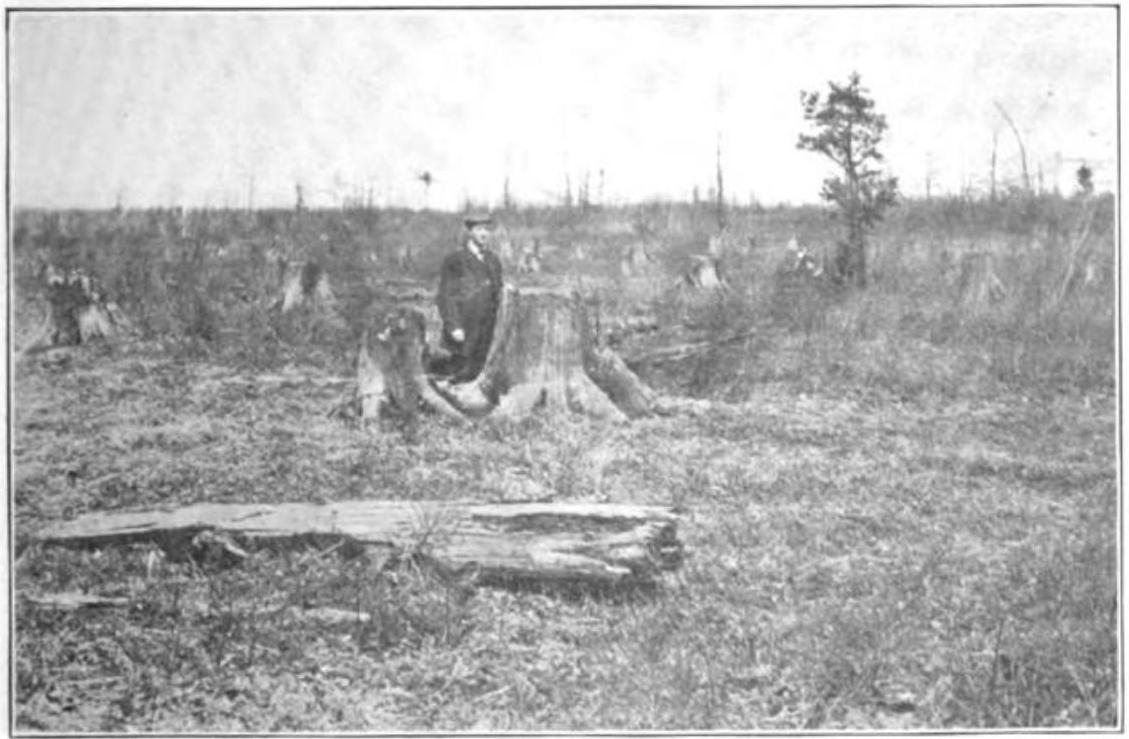
Clearcutting led to the "Pennsylvania Desert", caused local extinction of many species, and changed the seasonal flow of streams.

Descriptions from early explorers and settlers give some idea of what the Pine Creek Gorge was like before it was clearcut. The forest was up to 85 percent hemlock and white pine, with the rest hardwoods. Many animal species that are now vanished inhabited the area. A herd of 12,000 American bison migrated along the West Branch Susquehanna River in 1773. Pine Creek was home to large predators such as wolves, lynx, wolverines, panthers, fishers, foxes and bobcats, all save the last three now locally extinct. The area had herds of elk and deer, and large numbers of black bears, river otters, and beavers. In 1794, two of the earliest white explorers to travel up Pine Creek found so many rattlesnakes on its banks that they had to sleep in their canoe. Further upstream, insects forced them to do the same.

The virgin forests cooled the land and streams. Centuries of accumulated organic matter in the forest soil caused slow percolation of rainfall into the creeks and runs, so they flowed more evenly year-round. Pine Creek was home to large numbers of fish, including trout, but dams downstream on the Susquehanna River have eliminated the shad, salmon, and eels once found in the creek. The clearcutting of forests destroyed habitat for animals, but there was also a great deal of hunting, with bounties paid for large predators.

=== State Natural Area and wildlife ===
Looking north from Leonard Harrison State Park in autumn

While Leonard Harrison and Colton Point State Parks and parts of the surrounding Tioga State Forest are now the Pine Creek Gorge National Natural Landmark, it is their status as part of a Pennsylvania State Natural Area that provides the strongest protection for them. Within this Natural Area, all logging, mining, and oil and gas drilling are prohibited, and only foot trail access is allowed. In 1988 the Pennsylvania Department of Environmental Resources, precursor to the DCNR, described it as

about 95% State owned, unroaded, and designated the Pine Creek Gorge Natural Area. It is a place of unique geologic history and contains some rare plant communities, an old growth hemlock stand, ... active bald eagle nest[s] ... and is a major site of river otter reintroduction. Departmental policy is protection of the natural values of the Canyon from development and overuse, and restoration of the area to as near a natural condition as possible.

The gorge has over 225 species of wildflowers, plants and trees, with scattered stands of old growth forest on some of its steepest walls. The rest of the gorge is covered with thriving second growth forest that can be over one hundred years old. However, since clearcutting, nearly 90 percent of the forest land has burnt at least once. Typical south-facing slopes here have mountain laurel below oak and hickory trees, while north-facing slopes tend to have ferns below hemlocks and hardwoods. Large chestnuts and black cherry can also be found.

The Grand Canyon of Pennsylvania is known for its fall foliage, and Leonard Harrison State Park is a popular place to observe the colors, with the first three weeks of October as the best time to see the leaves in their full color. Red leaves are found on red maple, red oak, and black cherry, while orange and yellow leaves are on black walnut, sugar maple, aspen, birch, tulip poplar and chestnut oak, and brown leaves are from beech, white oak, and eastern black oak trees. Plants of "special concern" in Pennsylvania that are found in the gorge include Jacob's ladder, wild pea, and hemlock parsley.

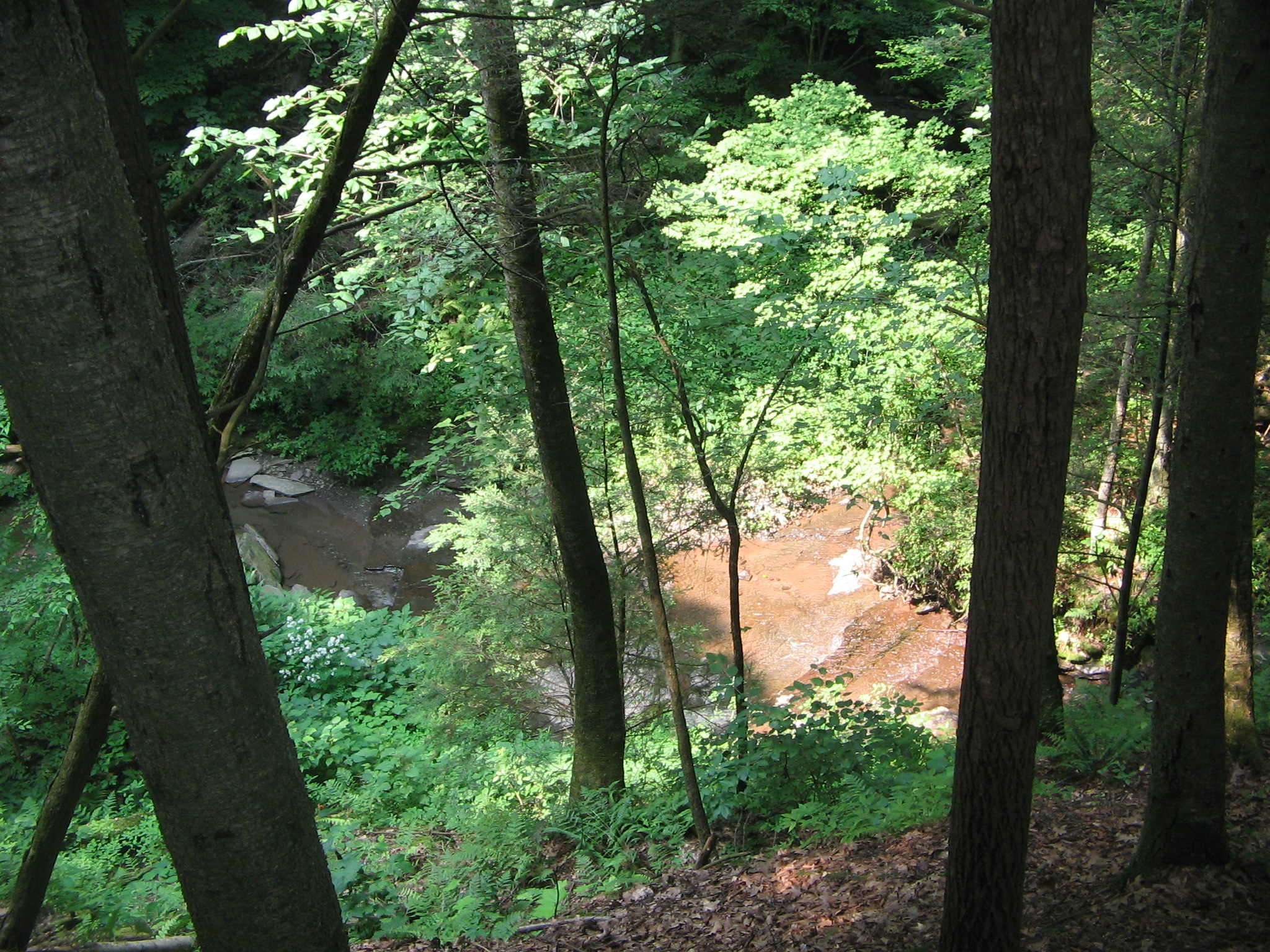
Second-growth forest along Little Fourmile Run, as seen from the Turkey Path

There are over 40 species of mammals in the Pine Creek Gorge. Leonard Harrison State Park's extensive forest cover makes it a habitat for "big woods" wildlife, including white-tailed deer, black bear, wild turkey, red and gray squirrels. Less common creatures include bobcats, coyote, fishers, river otters, and timber rattlesnakes. There are over 26 species of fish in Pine Creek, including trout, suckers, fallfish, and rock bass. Other aquatic species include crayfish and frogs.

Several species have been reintroduced to the gorge. White-tailed deer were imported from Michigan and released throughout Pennsylvania to reestablish what had once been a thriving population. The current population of deer in Pennsylvania are descended from the original stock introduced beginning in 1906, after the lumberman had moved out of the area. The deer population has grown so much that today they exceed their carrying capacity in many areas. River otters were successfully reintroduced in 1983 and now breed in the gorge. Despite the fears of anglers, their diet is only 5 percent trout.

Fishers, medium-sized weasels, were reintroduced to Pine Creek Gorge as part of an effort to establish a healthy population of fishers in Pennsylvania. Prior to the lumber era, fishers were numerous throughout the forests of Pennsylvania. They are generalized predators and will hunt any smaller creatures in their territory, including porcupines. Elk have been reintroduced west of the gorge in Clinton County and occasionally wander near the west rim of the canyon. Coyotes have come back on their own. Invasive insect species in the gorge include gypsy moths, which eat all the leaves off trees, especially oaks, and hemlock woolly adelgids, which weaken and kill hemlocks. Invasive plant species include purple loosestrife and Japanese knotweed.

=== Important Bird Area ===
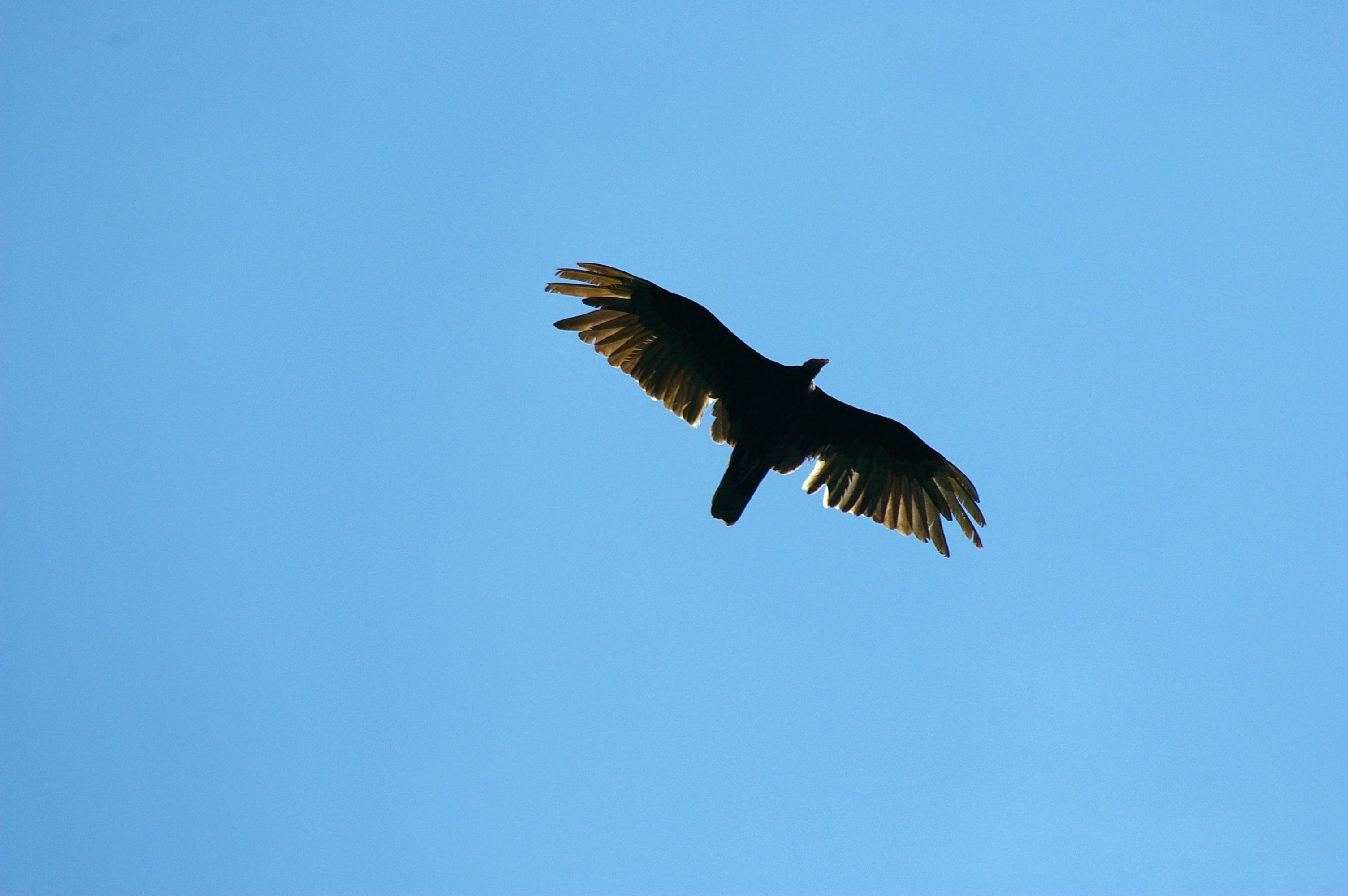
Turkey vulture at Leonard Harrison State Park

Leonard Harrison State Park is part of Important Bird Area #28, which encompasses 31,790 acres (12,860 ha) of both publicly and private held land. State managed acreage accounts for 68 percent of the total area and includes Leonard Harrison and Colton Point State Parks and the surrounding Tioga State Forest lands. The Pennsylvania Audubon Society has designated all 585 acres (237 ha) of Leonard Harrison State Park as part of the IBA, which is an area designated as a globally important habitat for the conservation of bird populations.

Ornithologists and bird watchers have recorded a total of 128 species of birds in the IBA. Several factors contribute to the high total of bird species observed: there is a large area of forest in the IBA, as well as great habitat diversity, with 343 acres (139 ha) of open water that is used by many of the birds, especially bald eagles. The location of the IBA along the Pine Creek Gorge also contributes to the diverse bird populations.

In addition to bald eagles, which live in the IBA year round and have successfully established a breeding population there, the IBA is home to belted kingfishers, scarlet tanagers, black-throated blue warblers, common mergansers, blue and green heron, hermit thrushes, and wood ducks. Large numbers of ospreys use the gorge during spring and fall migration periods. The woodlands are inhabited by the ruffed grouse, Pennsylvania's state bird, and wild turkeys. Swainson's thrush breeds in the IBA and the northern harrier breeds and overwinters in Pine Creek Gorge.

A variety of warblers is found in Leonard Harrison State Park. The Pennsylvania Audubon Society states that Pine Creek Gorge is "especially rich in warbler species, including Pine, Black-throated Blue, Black-throated Green, Blackburnian, and Black-and-white." Many of these smaller birds are more often heard than seen as they keep away from the trails and overlooks.

== Recreation ==
=== Trails ===
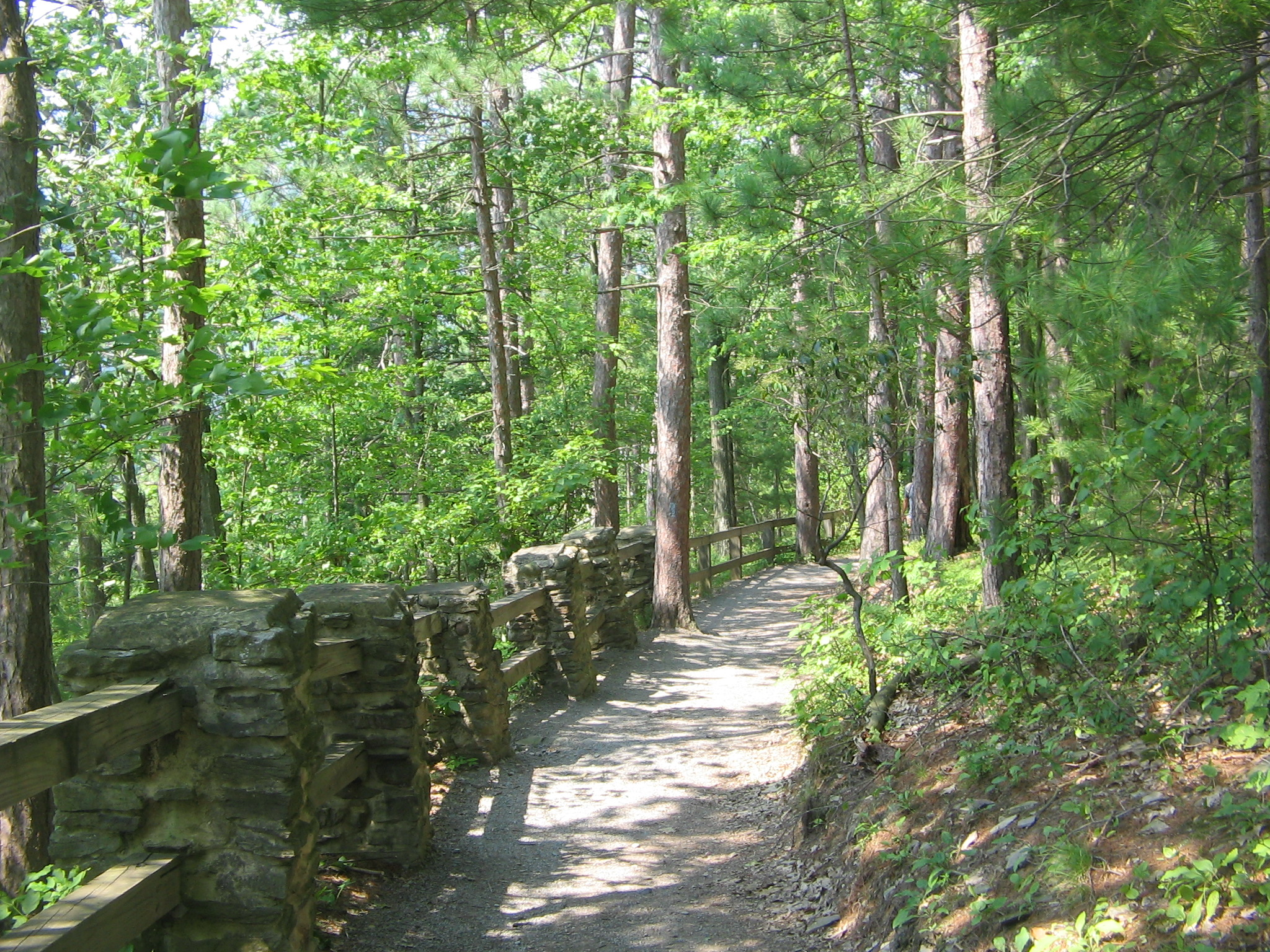
Near the upper trailhead of the Turkey Path

Leonard Harrison State Park is a destination for avid hikers, with some challenging hikes in and around the Grand Canyon of Pennsylvania. The park has 4.6 miles (7.4 km) of trails that feature very rugged terrain, pass close to steep cliffs, and can be slick in some areas. In 2003, the DCNR reported that 37,775 people used the trails in the park, and another 24,407 bicycled in it.

- Overlook Trail is a 0.6-mile (0.97 km) path to Otter View, a vista looking to the south. This moderately difficult loop passes reminders of the CCC's work in the park, including a plantation of red pines and an old incinerator.
- Turkey Path is a difficult trail, 2 miles (3.2 km) long (down and back), that follows Little Fourmile Run down the side of the canyon, descending over 800 feet (240 m) to Pine Creek and the rail trail at the bottom of the gorge. It was originally a mule drag used to haul timber to the creek. There are several waterfalls on the trail, which passes through an environmentally sensitive area and is on a steep slope. Hikers are encouraged to remain on the path to reduce erosion and protect fragile plant life along the trail. In 2006 a hiker who had left the path slipped near a waterfall and fell to his death.

A vista at the halfway point on Turkey Path was constructed in 1978 by the Youth Conservation Corps. Hand rails, steps and observation decks were added to the path in 1993 by the Pennsylvania Conservation Corps. The park website classifies it as a "down and back trail" since there is no bridge across Pine Creek. However, there is also a Turkey Path from Colton Point State Park on the west rim of the gorge down to a point on Pine Creek just upstream of the end of this trail. According to Owlett and the DCNR Pine Creek Rail Trail map, the creek can be forded with care when the water is low, and the Turkey Path connects the two parks.

- Pine Creek Rail Trail is a 63.4-mile (102.0 km) rail trail from Wellsboro Junction, just north of Wellsboro, south through the Pine Creek Gorge to Jersey Shore: 1 mile (1.6 km) of this trail is in Leonard Harrison and Colton Point State Parks. A 2001 article in USA Today said the scenic beauty of the Grand Canyon of Pennsylvania made the trail one of "10 great places to take a bike tour" in the world.

=== Camping and picnics ===
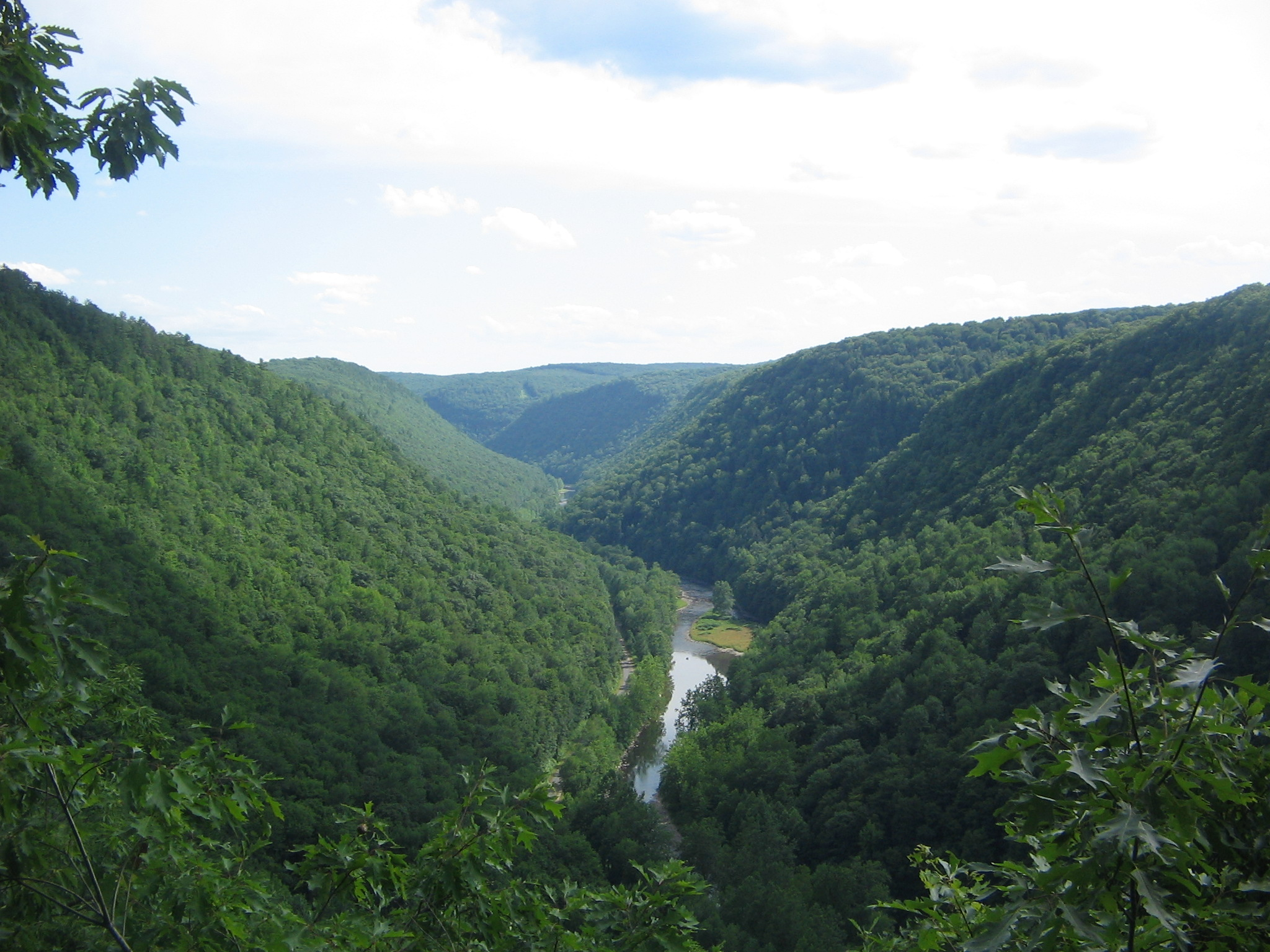
Looking south into the Pine Creek Gorge from the Otter vista, the nearly level horizon is a hallmark of a dissected plateau.

Camping is a popular pastime at Leonard Harrison State Park, with 3,511 persons using the rustic camping facilities in 2003. The DCNR classifies camping facilities as "rustic" if they do not have flush toilets or showers. The state has renovated the park camping area since 2003, building modern bathrooms with flush toilets and hot showers, and no longer considers it "rustic". The park has updated electric sites for RV campers as well. The campground has picnic tables and fire rings. The park has almost 100 picnic tables for use; seven of these tables are in shelters. The park hosted some 29,150 picnickers in 2003.

=== Hunting, fishing, and whitewater ===
Hunting is permitted on about 250 acres (100 ha) of Leonard Harrison State Park: hunters are expected to follow the rules and regulations of the Pennsylvania State Game Commission. The common game species are ruffed grouse, eastern gray squirrel, wild turkey, white-tailed deer, and black bear; however, hunting groundhog is prohibited. Additional acres of forested woodlands are available for hunting on the grounds of the adjacent Tioga State Forest.

Fishing is permitted at the state park, though anglers must descend the Turkey Path to reach Pine Creek. This has been designated as approved trout waters by the Pennsylvania Fish and Boat Commission, which means the waters will be stocked with trout and may be fished during trout season. Other species of fish found in Pine Creek include smallmouth bass and some panfish. Several small trout streams are accessible from within the park, which had 2,597 anglers in 2003. Historically, fishermen of note on the stretch of Pine Creek in the park include President Theodore Roosevelt and Pennsylvania Governor William A. Stone.

Edward Gertler writes in Keystone Canoeing that Pine Creek "is possibly Pennsylvania's most famous canoe stream" and attributes this partly to the thousands who decide to boat on it after they "peer into Pine Creek's spectacular abyss from the overlooks of Leonard Harrison and Colton Point state parks". The park contains 1 mile (1.6 km) of Pine Creek, which is Class 1 to Class 2 whitewater here. Boaters do not normally start or end their run in the park, which has no launches: it is part of the 16.8-mile (27.0 km) trip from Ansonia (Marsh Creek) south to Blackwell (Babb Creek).

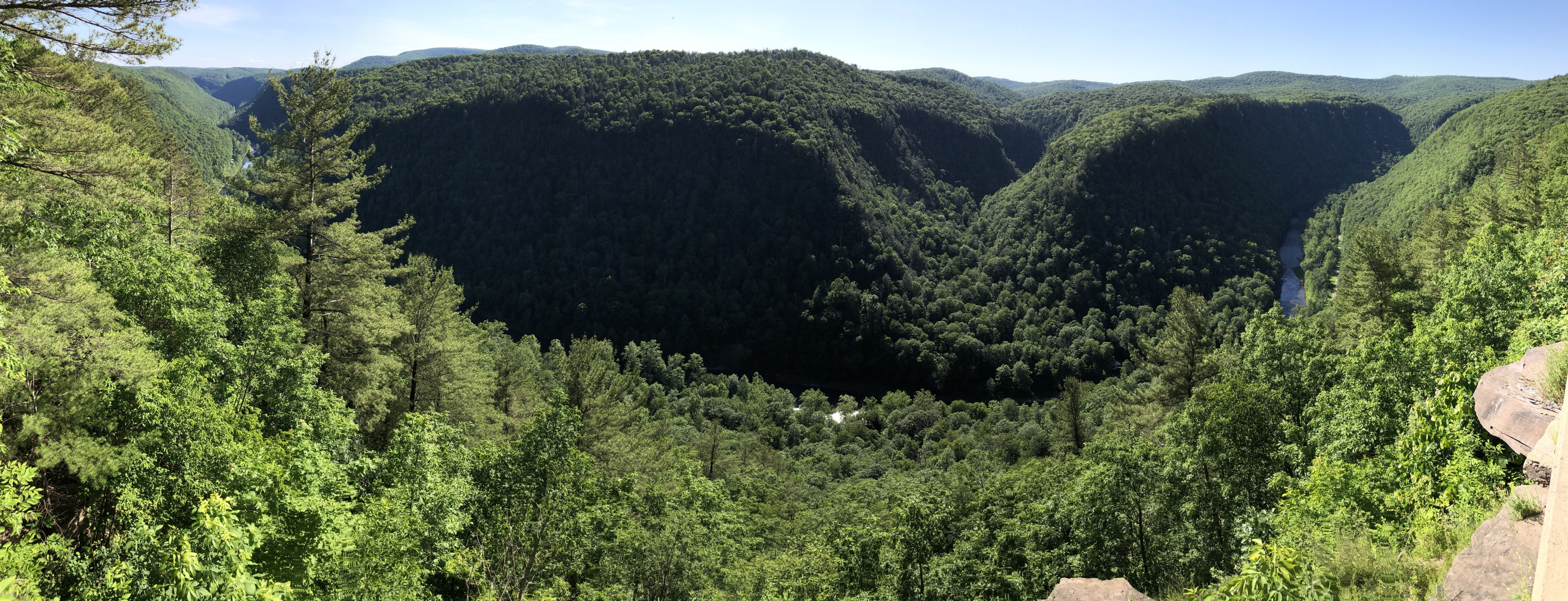
Panoramic view of the Pine Creek Gorge from the main vista terrace in Leonard Harrison State Park
