= Pennsylvania Route 362 =

State highway in Tioga County, Pennsylvania, US

Pennsylvania Route 362

Route information
- Maintained by PennDOT
- Length: 5.341 mi (8.596 km)
- Existed: September 1941–present

Major junctions
- West end: US 6 in Shippen Township
- East end: PA 660 in Delmar Township

Location
- Country: United States
- State: Pennsylvania
- Counties: Tioga

Highway system
- Pennsylvania State Route System; Interstate; US; State; Scenic; Legislative
← PA 360	→ PA 363

Pennsylvania Route 362 (designated by the Pennsylvania Department of Transportation as PA 362) is a 5.3-mile-long (8.5 km) state highway located in Tioga County, Pennsylvania. The western terminus is at U.S. Route 6 in Shippen Township. The eastern terminus is at Route 660 near Wellsboro in Delmar Township.

== Route description ==
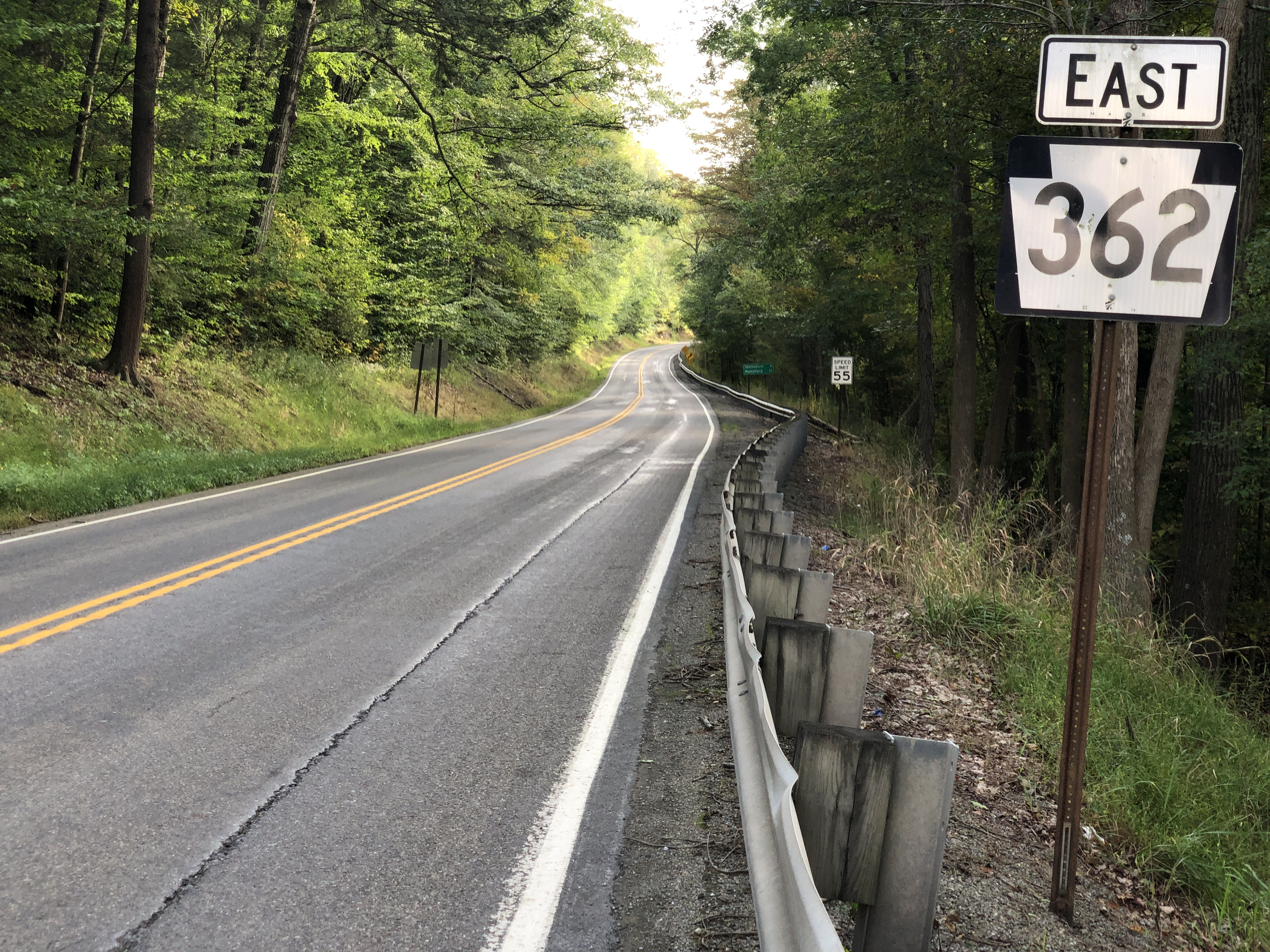
PA 362 eastbound after US 6 in Shippen Township

PA 362 begins at an intersection with US 6 in the community of Ansonia in Shippen Township, heading south on two-lane undivided Pinecreek Road. The route heads through forested areas of mountains, running to the east of Pine Creek. The road curves southeast away from Pine Creek and turns to the east. PA 362 continues into agricultural areas with some homes, passing to the north of Wellsboro Johnston Airport. The route enters Delmar Township and runs through more farmland before reaching its eastern terminus at PA 660.

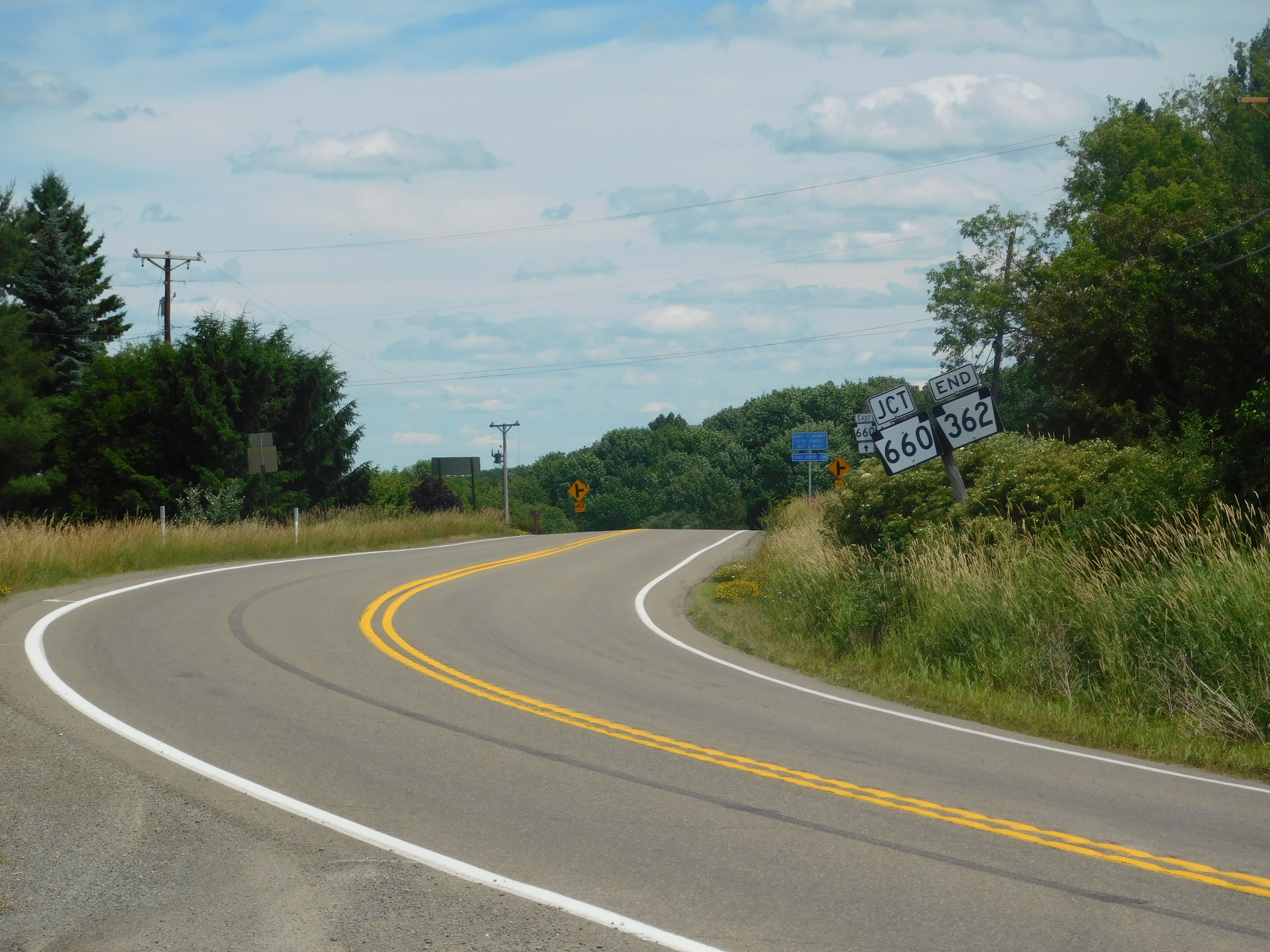
PA 362 approaching PA 660 in Delmar Township

== History ==
Route 362 was first assigned in September 1941. The route has retained the same alignment since its creation.

== Major intersections ==
The entire route is in Tioga County.

Location	mi	km	Destinations	Notes
Shippen Township	0.000	0.000	US 6 – Coudersport, Wellsboro	Western terminus
Delmar Township	5.341	8.596	PA 660 – Wellsboro	Eastern terminus
1.000 mi = 1.609 km; 1.000 km = 0.621 mi
