= Thumptown, Pennsylvania =

Unincorporated community in Pennsylvania, US

- Unincorporated community
- Location within Pennsylvania
- Coordinates: 41°42′10″N 77°23′28″W
- Country: United States
- State: Pennsylvania
- County: Tioga
- Elevation: 1,827 ft (557 m)
- Time zone: UTC-5 (Eastern (EST))
  - Summer (DST): UTC-4 (EDT)
- Area code: 570
- GNIS feature ID: 1189559

Thumptown (also Trumptown) is an unincorporated community in Delmar Township, Tioga County, Pennsylvania, United States.
