= Leonard Harrison (businessman) =

- Born: January 10, 1850; Delmar Township, Pennsylvania
- Died: January 13, 1929 (aged 79); Baltimore, Maryland
- Resting place: Wellsboro Cemetery
- Occupation: Businessman
- Known for: Leonard Harrison State Park

Leonard Harrison (January 10, 1850 – January 13, 1929) was a lumberman and businessman who spent most of his life in Wellsboro, Pennsylvania and donated Leonard Harrison State Park to the state of Pennsylvania in 1922.

== Early and personal life ==
Harrison's maternal grandparents, William and Catherine Meek, lived in England, where his mother, Catherine, was born in 1816. The Meek family came to Wellsboro in 1833, where William was a merchant and tailor. Harrison's father William was born in New Jersey and also came to Wellsboro in 1833, where he helped build the Tioga County courthouse. Harrison's parents met in Wellsboro, married, and had seven children, although only three survived to adulthood. Leonard Harrison was born on January 10, 1850.

Harrison attended the Wellsboro public schools and the Wellsboro Academy. He worked as a carpenter in his father's business initially, then began working as a clerk in the Wellsboro post office and for a bookstore when he was 15. From 1878 to 1884, he worked as a clerk in the Tioga County Commissioners' office, where he became familiar with land throughout the county. He began to work in the lumber business, and in 1883 began a coal business, which operated for ten years.

In 1882, Harrison married Mary Green. They lived at 10 West Avenue in Wellsboro and had three children: George, Emily, and Catherine. Emily died before 1900, and William was killed working in the family lumber business in West Virginia in 1941. Catherine never married and died in 1971. All are buried in the Wellsboro Cemetery.

== Lumberman and civic leader ==
Harrison was a founder of the "Tyoga Lumber Company" which owned large tracts of land for timber and coal in Nicholas County, West Virginia, as well as land in Michigan, Newfoundland, and Pennsylvania. Harrison owned a substantial amount of land in the Pine Creek Gorge. In the 1890s, Harrison operated a sawmill on Pine Creek at Tiadaghton in the middle of the gorge. This mill was supplied with logs, not by train as was most common in that era, but by a log slide built into the side of the gorge. The log slide was used on a year-round basis: during the winter the logs slid down on ice; following the snowmelt the slide was greased to ease the descent of the logs.

Harrison served as the first president of the Wellsborough Electric Company, which was incorporated on April 11, 1894. In August 1896, Harrison was chosen president of the First National Bank of Wellsboro. He also served as clerk and burgess for the borough of Wellsboro and served for more than forty years as a school director there. Harrison helped rebuild the Wellsboro Penn Hotel in the 1920s. He was a major supporter and leader of the Wellsboro Presbyterian Church.

== State park, death, and legacy ==
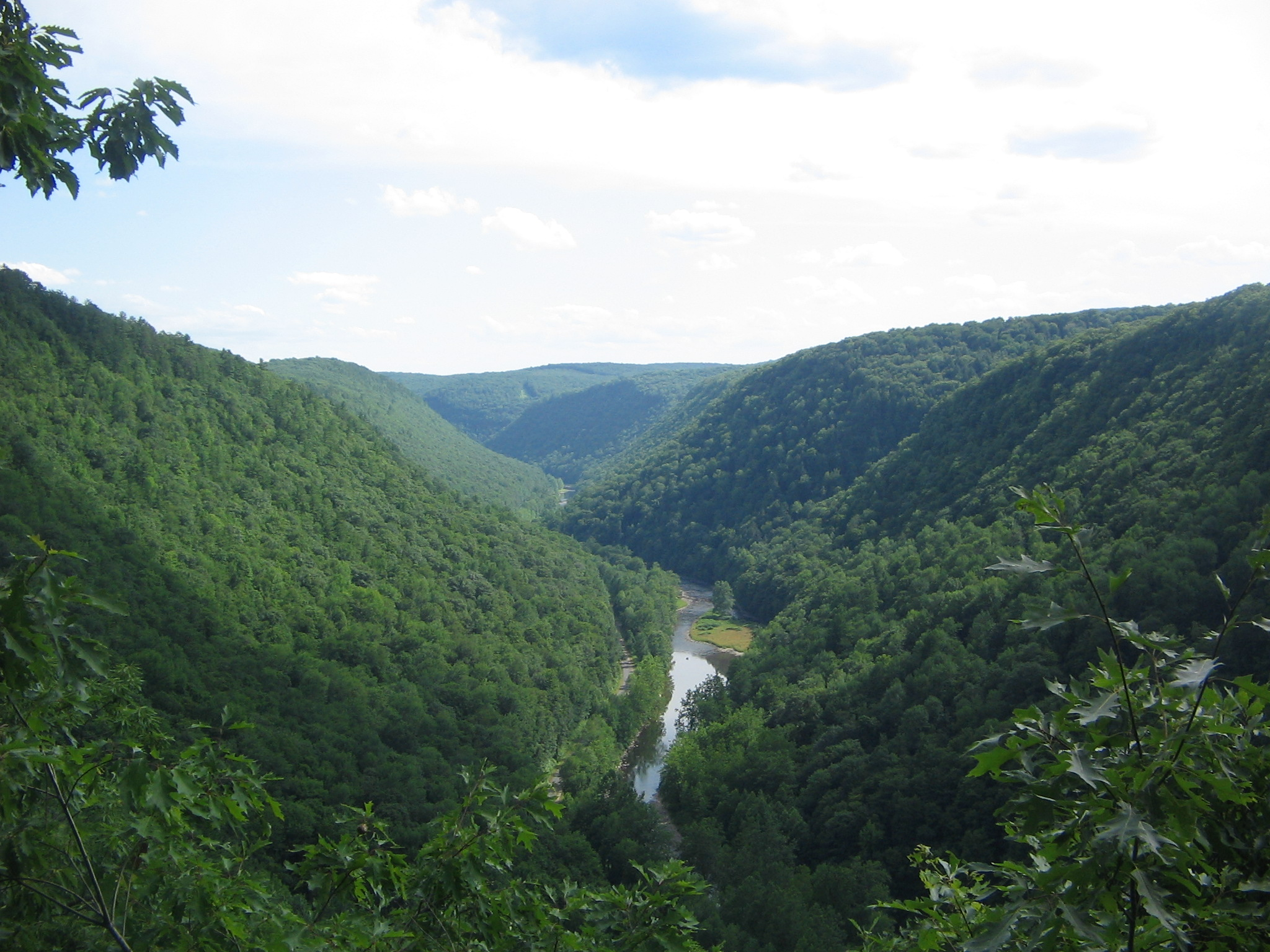
View south into the Pine Creek Gorge from a lookout in Leonard Harrison State Park

After the village of Tiadaghton and its mill were destroyed by a fire, Harrison turned his attention to tourism. He purchased 121 acres (49 ha) of land at the site of the current state park that bears his name in 1906. He developed this land, then known as "The Lookout", and invited the public to enjoy the beauty of the Pine Creek Gorge. Harrison donated the picnic grounds to the Commonwealth of Pennsylvania in 1922, and it is known as Leonard Harrison State Park.

Harrison died of pneumonia following surgery on January 13, 1929, at the Johns Hopkins University hospital in Baltimore, Maryland. His obituary on the front page of the Wellsboro newspaper read "Borough Loses Greatest Giver", and he was notable enough to have a brief obituary in the New York Times.

Harrison left plans and a large bequest for the Soldiers and Sailors Hospital in Wellsboro, which was built only after his death. The state park which bears his name became very popular after a publicity campaign in the 1930s. More than 300,000 tourists visited the canyon by the autumn of 1936, and 15,000 visited Leonard Harrison over Memorial Day weekend in 1937. That year more visitors came to the Pine Creek Gorge than to Yellowstone National Park. In 2003, the park had 142,716 visitors, and Leonard Harrison State Park is part of the twenty-one state parks chosen by the DCNR Pennsylvania Bureau of Parks for its "Twenty Must-See Pennsylvania State Parks" list. Leonard Harrison and Colton Point State Parks are the only two parks treated as one unit for the list. The DCNR describes the parks together, noting how they "offer spectacular vistas and a fabulous view of Pine Creek Gorge, also known as Pennsylvania's Grand Canyon". It goes on to praise their inclusion in a National Natural Landmark and State Park Natural Area, hiking and trails, and the Pine Creek Rail Trail and bicycling.
