= Shippen Township, Tioga County, Pennsylvania =

Township in Pennsylvania, US

Coordinates: 41°43′00″N 77°26′59″W

Shippen Township, Pennsylvania
- Township
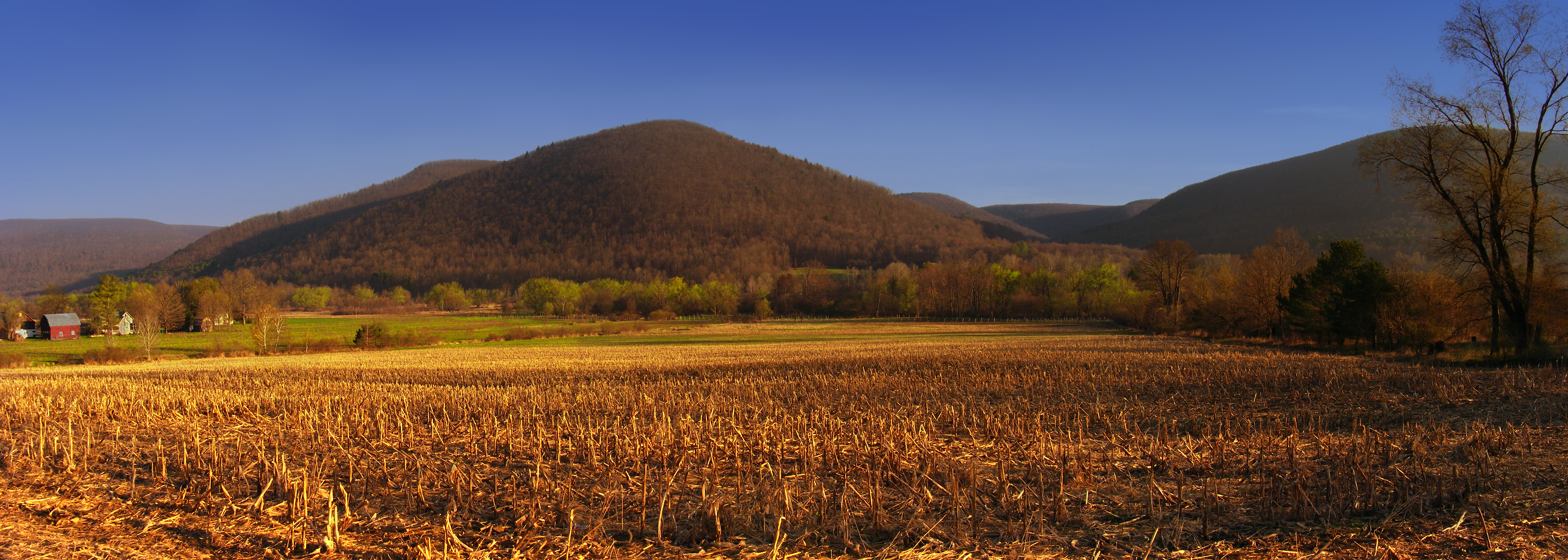
- A view from U.S. Route 6 in Shippen Township

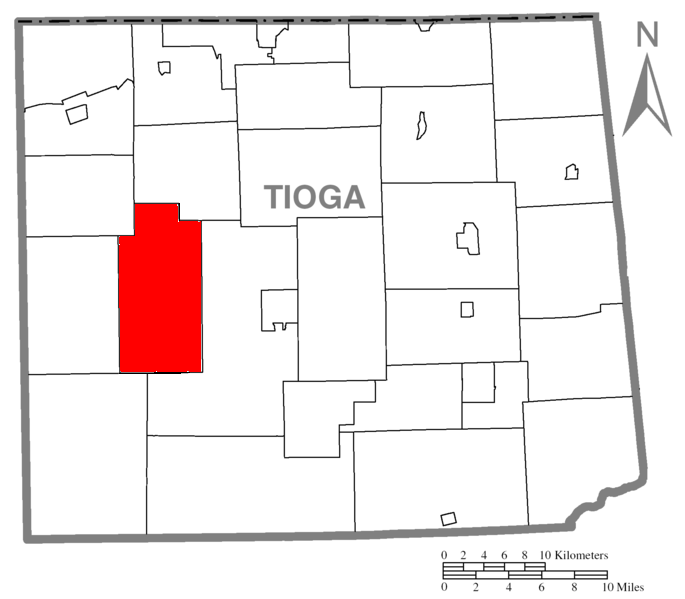
- Map of Tioga County with Shippen Township highlighted

- Map of Pennsylvania highlighting Tioga County
- Country: United States
- State: Pennsylvania
- County: Tioga
- Settled: 1804
- Incorporated: 1823

Area
  - Total: 48.67 sq mi (126.06 km^{2})
  - Land: 48.64 sq mi (125.98 km^{2})
  - Water: 0.031 sq mi (0.08 km^{2})

Population (2020)
  - Total: 499 ▼
  - Estimate (2023): 497
  - Density: 10.7/sq mi (4.14/km^{2})
- Time zone: Eastern Time Zone (North America)
  - Summer (DST): EDT
- FIPS code: 42-117-70344

Historical population
Census	Pop.	Note	%±
2000	472		—
2010	527		11.7%
2020	499		−5.3%
2023 (est.)	497		−0.4%
U.S. Decennial Census

Shippen Township is a township in Tioga County, Pennsylvania, United States. The population was 499 at the 2020 census. Two Pennsylvania state parks, Colton Point and Leonard Harrison are in Shippen Township at the Pennsylvania Grand Canyon. The Grand Canyon Airport is also located on Pennsylvania Route 362 in Shippen Township.

== History ==
The Colton Point State Park was listed on the National Register of Historic Places in 1987.

== Geography ==
According to the United States Census Bureau, the township has a total area of 48.9 square miles (126.6 km^{2}), of which 48.8 square miles (126.5 km^{2}) is land and 0.04 square mile (0.1 km^{2}) (0.06%) is water.

Shippen Township is bordered by Chatham Township to the north and east and Delmar Township to the east and south. Elk Township borders the southwest corner. Gaines Township forms the western border. Shippen Township is bordered by Clymer Township to the northwest.

== Demographics ==
As of the census of 2000, there were 472 people, 177 households, and 135 families residing in the township. The population density was 9.7 people per square mile (3.7/km^{2}). There were 338 housing units at an average density of 6.9/sq mi (2.7/km^{2}). The racial makeup of the township was 98.52% White, 0.21% Asian, and 1.27% from two or more races.

There were 177 households, out of which 30.5% had children under the age of 18 living with them, 67.2% were married couples living together, 5.6% had a female householder with no husband present, and 23.2% were non-families. 20.3% of all households were made up of individuals, and 8.5% had someone living alone who was 65 years of age or older. The average household size was 2.67 and the average family size was 3.04.

In the township the population was spread out, with 24.8% under the age of 18, 6.1% from 18 to 24, 26.5% from 25 to 44, 29.9% from 45 to 64, and 12.7% who were 65 years of age or older. The median age was 40 years. For every 100 females, there were 106.1 males. For every 100 females age 18 and over, there were 107.6 males.

The median income for a household in the township was $27,212, and the median income for a family was $30,357. Males had a median income of $30,375 versus $21,071 for females. The per capita income for the township was $13,544. About 6.8% of families and 8.3% of the population were below the poverty line, including 8.1% of those under age 18 and 8.5% of those age 65 or over.

== Communities and locations ==
- Ansonia – A village on U.S. Route 6 in the central part of the township.
- Asaph – A village in the eastern part of the township, a few miles northeast of Ansonia.
- Colton Point State Park – A state park on the western side of Pine Creek.
- Leonard Harrison State Park – A state park on the eastern side of Pine Creek.
- Marsh Creek – A village near the eastern township line, named after a creek with the same name.
- Owassee – An area along Pine Creek in the southern part of the township near Colton Point State Park.
- Pine Creek Gorge – A scenic area that begins in the southern part of the township, also known as the Pennsylvania Grand Canyon.
- Tioga State Forest – The Tioga State Forest covers most of northern Shippen Township.
- Wellsboro Johnston Airport – An airport on the eastern township line that serves the Wellsboro area.
