= Charleston Township, Tioga County, Pennsylvania =

Township in Pennsylvania, US

Coordinates: 41°47′00″N 77°15′29″W

Charleston Township, Pennsylvania
- Township
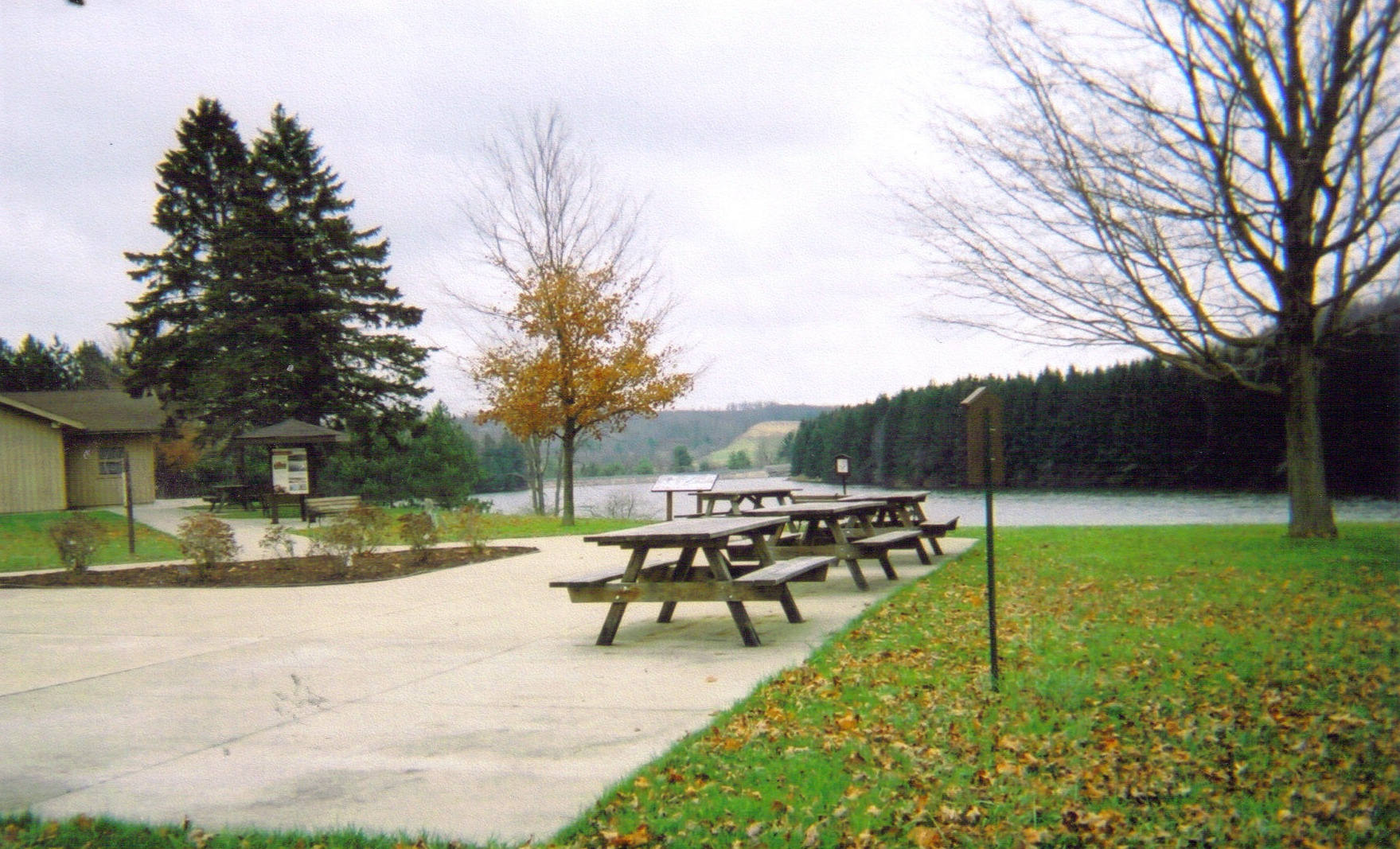
- A picnic area at Hills Creek State Park in Charleston Township

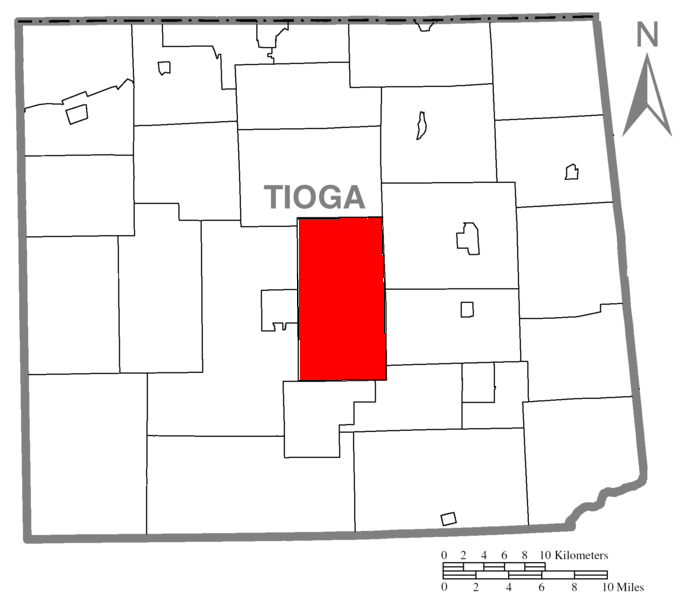
- Map of Tioga County with Charleston Township highlighted

- Map of Pennsylvania highlighting Tioga County
- Country: United States
- State: Pennsylvania
- County: Tioga
- Settled: 1805
- Incorporated: 1820

Area
  - Total: 52.50 sq mi (135.98 km^{2})
  - Land: 52.16 sq mi (135.09 km^{2})
  - Water: 0.34 sq mi (0.89 km^{2})

Population (2020)
  - Total: 3,560 ▲
  - Estimate (2023): 3,503
  - Density: 66.1/sq mi (25.54/km^{2})
- Time zone: Eastern Time Zone (North America)
  - Summer (DST): EDT
- FIPS code: 42-117-12728
- Website: www.charlestontownship-pa.com

Historical population
Census	Pop.	Note	%±
2000	3,233		—
2010	3,360		3.9%
2020	3,560		6.0%
2023 (est.)	3,503		−1.6%
U.S. Decennial Census

Charleston Township is a township in Tioga County, Pennsylvania, United States. The population was 3,560 at the 2020 census. Hills Creek State Park, one of 120 Pennsylvania state parks, is in Charleston Township.

== Geography ==
According to the United States Census Bureau, the township has a total area of 52.9 square miles (137 km^{2}), of which 52.6 square miles (136 km^{2}) is land and 0.3 square miles (0.78 km^{2}) (0.64%) is water.

Charleston Township is bordered by Middlebury Township to the north, Richmond and Covington Townships to the east, Bloss Township to the southeast, Duncan Township to the south and Wellsboro and Delmar Township to the west.

== Demographics ==
As of the census of 2000, there were 3,233 people, 1,203 households, and 880 families residing in the township. The population density was 61.5 people per square mile (23.7 people/km^{2}). There were 1,350 housing units at an average density of 25.7 per square mile (9.9/km^{2}). The racial makeup of the township was 97.93% White, 0.19% African American, 0.15% Native American, 0.65% Asian, 0.06% Pacific Islander, 0.09% from other races, and 0.93% from two or more races. Hispanic or Latino of any race were 1.08% of the population.

There were 1,203 households, out of which 31.7% had children under the age of 18 living with them, 62.1% were married couples living together, 7.2% had a female householder with no husband present, and 26.8% were non-families. 22.6% of all households were made up of individuals, and 9.2% had someone living alone who was 65 years of age or older. The average household size was 2.50 and the average family size was 2.93.

In the township the population was spread out, with 24.5% under the age of 18, 6.4% from 18 to 24, 25.2% from 25 to 44, 25.5% from 45 to 64, and 18.4% who were 65 years of age or older. The median age was 41 years. For every 100 females, there were 96.5 males. For every 100 females age 18 and over, there were 92.1 males.

The median income for a household in the township was $37,176, and the median income for a family was $43,548. Males had a median income of $31,224 versus $21,096 for females. The per capita income for the township was $16,621. About 8.5% of families and 10.1% of the population were below the poverty line, including 14.8% of those under age 18 and 9.4% of those age 65 or over.

== Communities and locations ==
- Benedicts Corners – A village near the eastern township line, southeast of Hills Creek State Park.
- Charleston – A village in the central part of the township, a few miles northeast of Wellsboro.
- Hills Creek State Park – A state park in the northeastern corner of the township that contains Hills Creek Lake.
- Pitts – A village on U.S. Route 6, just east of Wellsboro.
- Round Top – A village in the southwestern part of the township.
- Whitneyville – A village just off U.S. Route 6 and Pennsylvania Route 660 in the eastern part of the township.
- Willard – A village in the southwestern corner of the township, a couple miles south of Round Top.
