= Pine Creek Path =

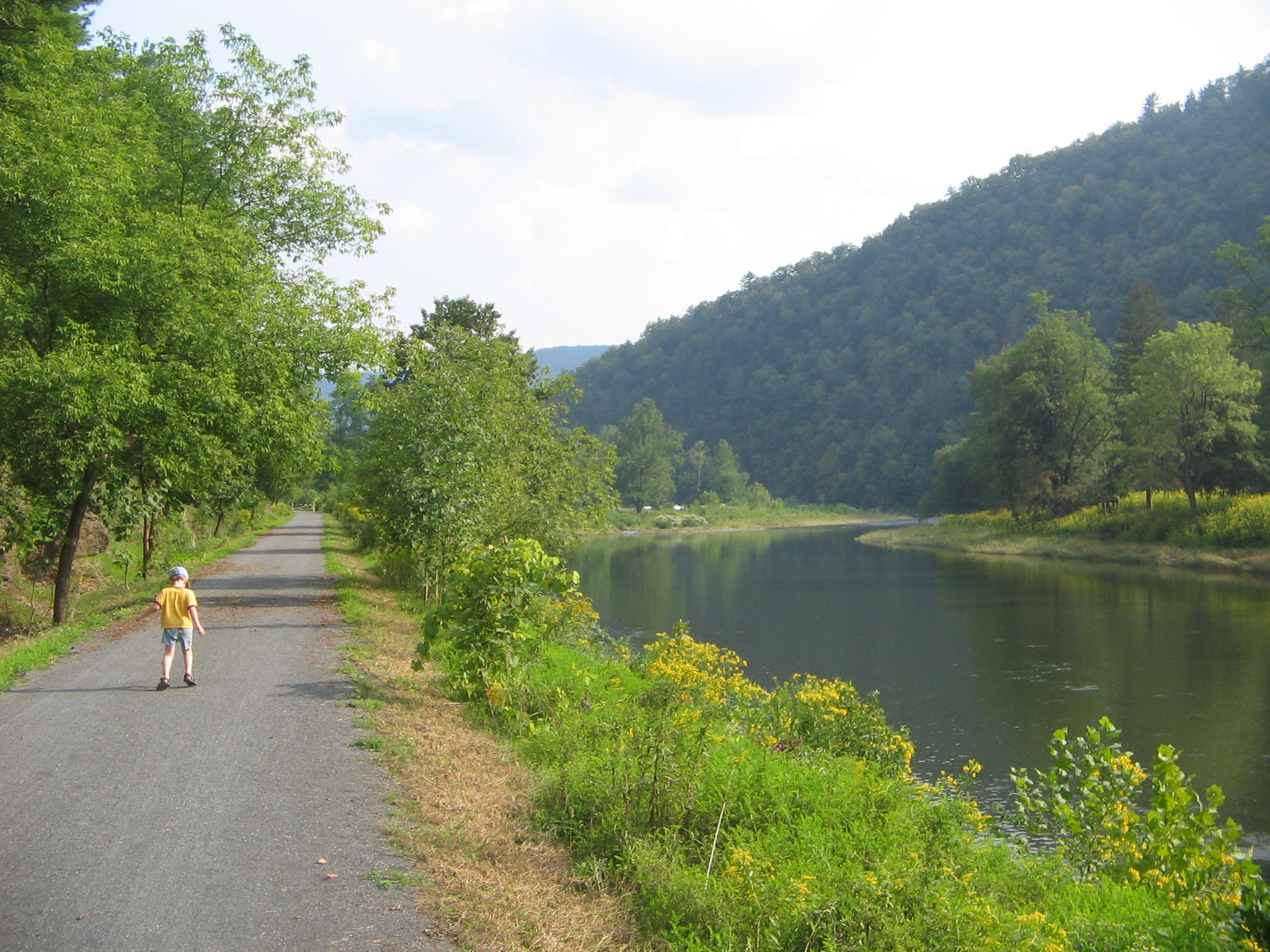
The modern Pine Creek Rail Trail follows the course of the Pine Creek Path, here north of Waterville in Cummings Township.

The Pine Creek Path was a major Native American trail in the U.S. State of Pennsylvania that ran north along Pine Creek from the West Branch Susquehanna River near Long Island (modern-day Jersey Shore) to the headwaters of the Genesee River (in modern-day Genesee Township, Pennsylvania).

== Course ==
At the southern end of the trail there was a Native American village at the site of Jersey Shore and the Great Shamokin Path ran east–west here along the West Branch Susquehanna River. The Great Shamokin Path connected the Saponi village of Shamokin (modern Sunbury) on the Susquehanna River in the east, with the Great Island (modern Lock Haven) and villages further west (what are now the boroughs of Clearfield and Kittanning) and the Allegheny River. In the north another path continued north along the Genesee River and led to the Iroquois Nation in New York.

The main Pine Creek Path followed Pine Creek north, switching banks until it reached the First Fork (modern Little Pine Creek at the village of Waterville). From there it stayed on the left bank the rest of its course along Pine Creek, passing through the Pine Creek Gorge to the Second Fork (Babb Creek at Blackwell) and on to the Third Fork (modern Marsh Creek) and the village of Ansonia. There it left the gorge and turned west, going past modern Galeton to West Pike, where it left the creek and headed north to the Genesee River. The exact course of the path between West Pike and the headwaters of the Genesee River are uncertain. In the south, an alternate branch (west of the main path) led north from the West Branch Susquehanna River along Chatham Run, past modern Woolrich to the main path near Waterville.

== Use ==
The path was used by Iroquois warriors on their war raids to points south. One of the earliest accounts of the path is from Moses Van Campen, who was captured on Bald Eagle Creek in 1782, and taken north as a prisoner along the path. Some isolated bands of Native Americans remained in the Pine Creek Gorge until the War of 1812. When lumbering become a major industry along Pine Creek in the 19th century, the path was used by lumbermen. They would take rafts of lumber in the spring down Pine Creek from Ansonia to Jersey Shore, and then walk back north along the path. Attempts to convert the path into a wagon road early in the same century were unsuccessful – when John Peet tried it he said it took 18 days, crossed Pine Creek "eighty times going to and eighty times coming from", lost a wheel, broke two axles, and upset the wagon twice.

In 1883, the Jersey Shore, Pine Creek and Buffalo Railway opened, following the course of the path from Jersey Shore to Ansonia. The railroad soon became the Pine Creek Railway, a part of the Fall Brook Coal Company. It was leased by the New York Central Railroad in 1899, and was consolidated into the New York Central Railroad in a 1914 corporate reorganization. The Pine Creek line was one of those taken over by Conrail in 1976, but the last train ran on the route on October 7, 1988. After the removal of the tracks, the right-of-way was converted to the Pine Creek Rail Trail, which was named one of "10 great places to take a bike tour" in the world in a 2001 USA Today article.

== See also ==
- Great Trail
