= Ansonia, Pennsylvania =

Unincorporated community in Pennsylvania, US

- Unincorporated community
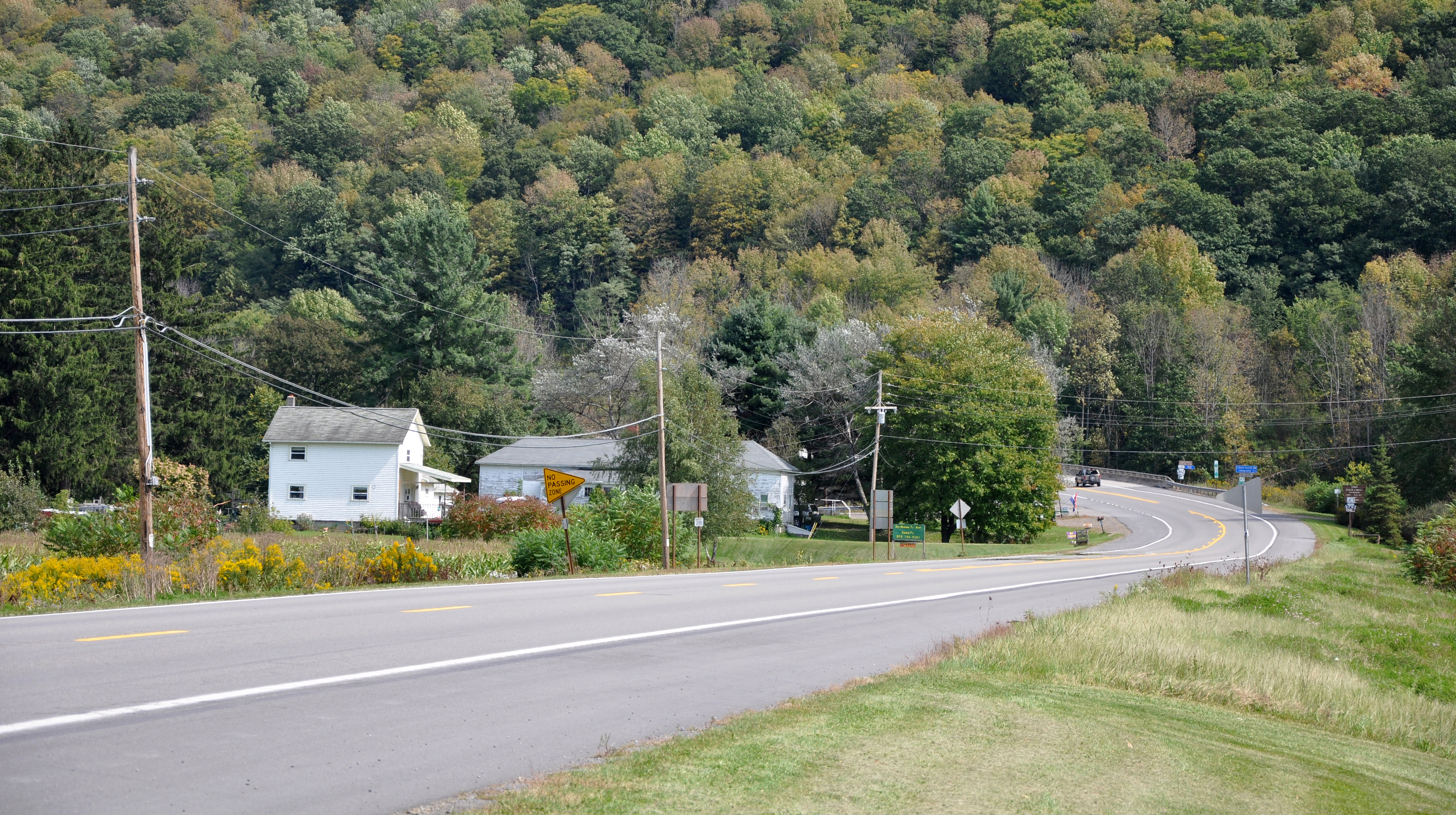
- Scattered houses in Ansonia, along Route 6

- Location within Pennsylvania
- Coordinates: 41°44′47″N 77°25′42″W
- Country: United States
- State: Pennsylvania
- County: Tioga
- Elevation: 1,138 ft (347 m)
- Time zone: UTC-5 (Eastern (EST))
  - Summer (DST): UTC-4 (EDT)
- ZIP: 16901
- Area code: 570
- GNIS feature ID: 1202981

Ansonia is an unincorporated community in Shippen Township, Tioga County, in the U.S. state of Pennsylvania. It lies along U.S. Route 6, near its junction with Pennsylvania Route 362, between Galeton and Wellsboro.

Ansonia is at the confluence of Marsh Creek and Pine Creek. The Pine Creek Rail Trail passes through Ansonia, where there is an access area.
