= Marsh Creek (Pine Creek tributary) =

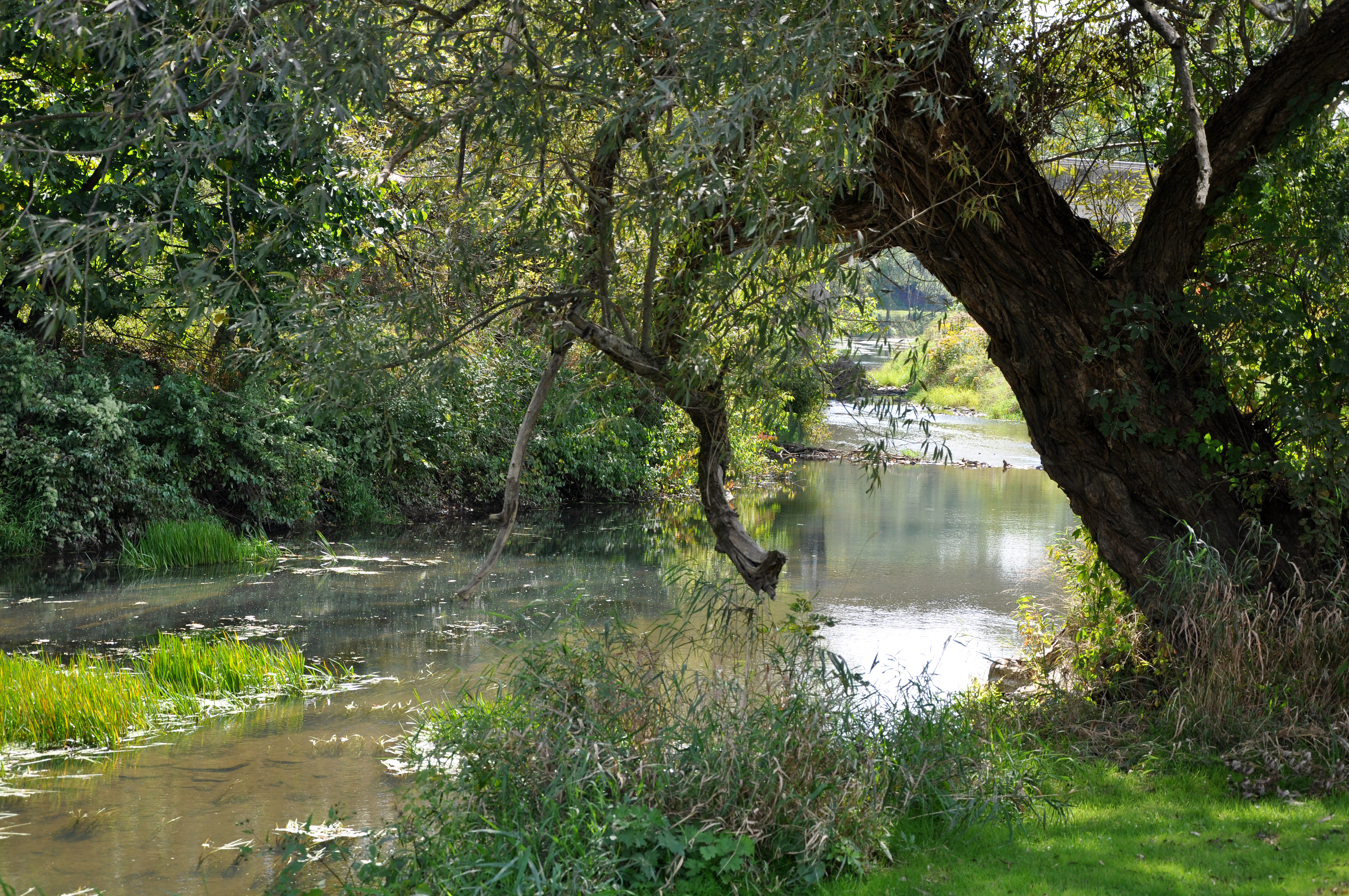
- Looking downstream from along Marsh Creek Road in Ansonia

- Location of the mouth of Marsh Creek in Pennsylvania

Location
- Country: United States
- State: Pennsylvania
- County: Tioga County

Physical characteristics
- Source
  - location: Wellsboro, Tioga State Forest
  - coordinates: 41°45′10″N 77°17′47″W
  - elevation: 1,283 ft (391 m)
- Mouth: Pine Creek
  - location: Ansonia
  - coordinates: 41°44′36″N 77°25′40″W
  - elevation: 1,142 ft (348 m)
- Length: 13 mi (21 km)

Marsh Creek is a 13.0-mile-long (20.9 km) tributary of Pine Creek in Pennsylvania in the United States.

Marsh Creek begins in the borough of Wellsboro, at the confluence of Kelsey Creek, Morris Branch, and Charleston Creek. Marsh Creek flows north, then west, and joins Pine Creek just downstream of Ansonia in Tioga County. A small flood in 1993 ruined a marginal amount of farmland.

== See also ==
- List of rivers of Pennsylvania
