= Delmar Township, Tioga County, Pennsylvania =

Township in Pennsylvania, US

Coordinates: 41°40′00″N 77°24′59″W

Delmar Township, Pennsylvania
- Township
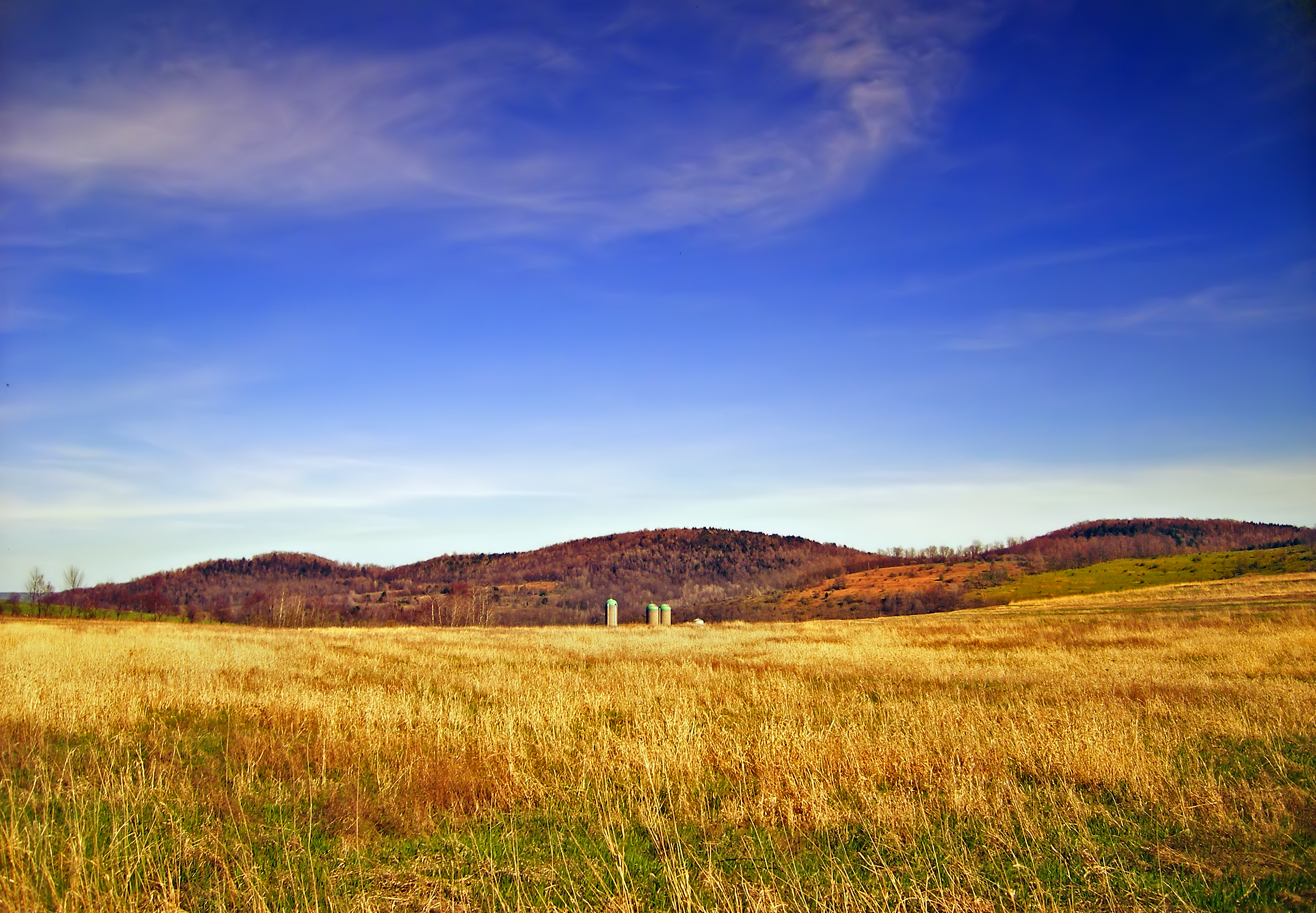
- A farm in Delmar Township

- Logo

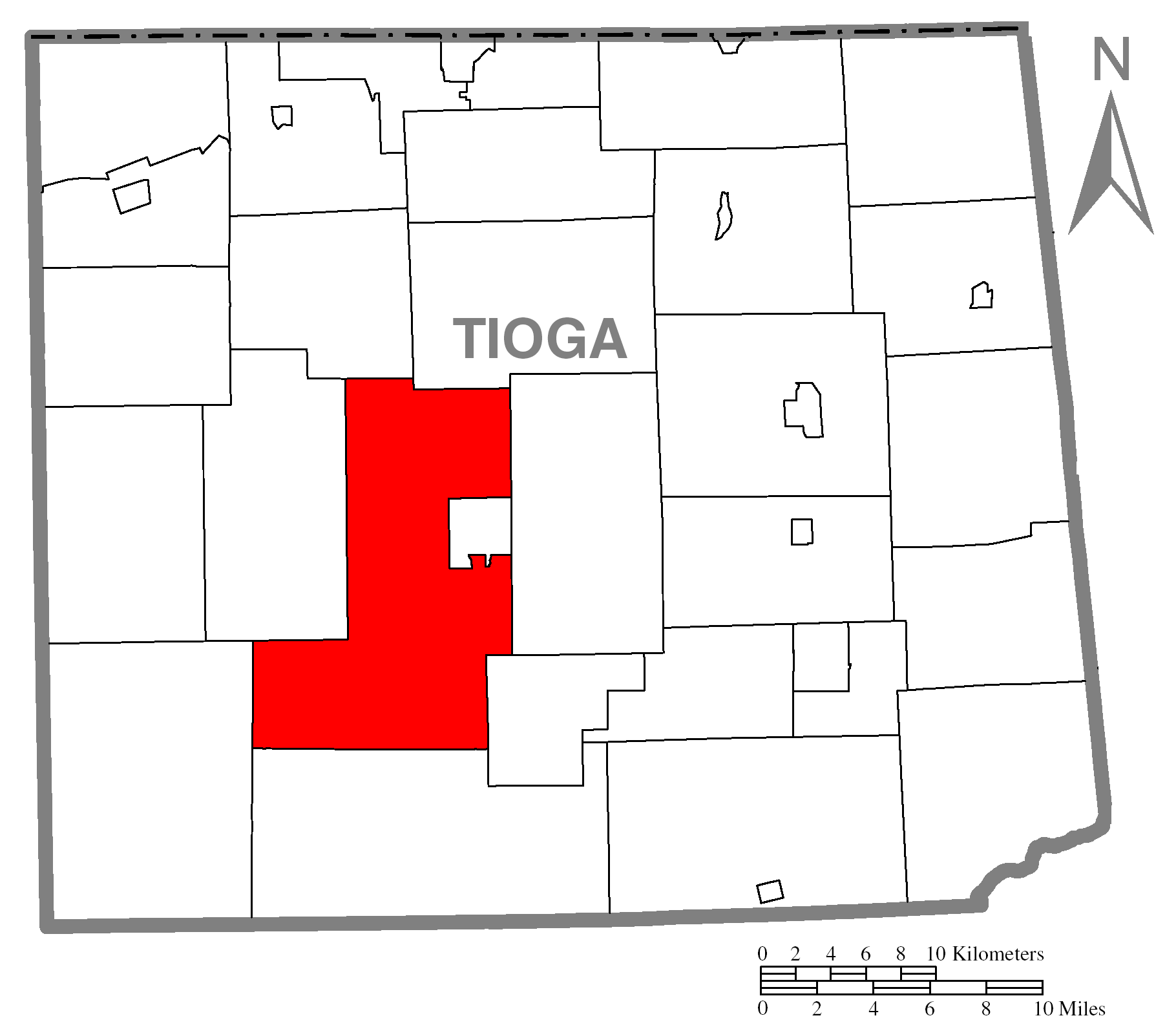
- Map of Tioga County Highlighting Delmar Township

- Map of Pennsylvania highlighting Tioga County
- Country: United States
- State: Pennsylvania
- County: Tioga
- Settled: 1802
- Incorporated: 1805

Area
  - Total: 82.40 sq mi (213.42 km^{2})
  - Land: 82.23 sq mi (212.98 km^{2})
  - Water: 0.17 sq mi (0.44 km^{2})

Population (2020)
  - Total: 2,795 ▼
  - Estimate (2023): 2,784
  - Density: 34.6/sq mi (13.35/km^{2})
- Time zone: Eastern Time Zone (North America)
  - Summer (DST): EDT
- FIPS code: 42-117-18760
- Website: delmartwp.com

Historical population
Census	Pop.	Note	%±
2000	2,893		—
2010	2,856		−1.3%
2020	2,795		−2.1%
2023 (est.)	2,784		−0.4%
U.S. Decennial Census

Delmar Township is a township in Tioga County, Pennsylvania, United States. The population was 2,795 at the 2020 census.

== Geography ==
According to the United States Census Bureau, the township has a total area of 80.6 square miles (209 km^{2}), of which 80.4 square miles (208 km^{2}) is land and 0.2 square miles (0.52 km^{2}) (0.20%) is water.

Delmar Township is bordered by Chatham and Middlebury Townships to the north, Charleston Township to the east, Duncan Township to the south and east, Morris Township to the south, Elk Township to the west and Shippen Township to the north and west. Delmar Township forms the northern, western, and southern borders of the borough of Wellsboro.

== Demographics ==
As of the census of 2000, there were 2,893 people, 1,092 households, and 855 families residing in the township. The population density was 36.0 inhabitants per square mile (13.9/km^{2}). There were 1,385 housing units at an average density of 17.2/sq mi (6.7/km^{2}). The racial makeup of the township was 98.79% White, 0.35% African American, 0.28% Native American, 0.10% Asian, 0.10% from other races, and 0.38% from two or more races. Hispanic or Latino of any race were 0.28% of the population.

There were 1,092 households, out of which 34.5% had children under the age of 18 living with them, 67.2% were married couples living together, 8.4% had a female householder with no husband present, and 21.7% were non-families. 18.5% of all households were made up of individuals, and 6.3% had someone living alone who was 65 years of age or older. The average household size was 2.64 and the average family size was 3.00.

In the township, the population was spread out, with 26.1% under the age of 18, 6.6% from 18 to 24, 27.0% from 25 to 44, 27.4% from 45 to 64, and 12.9% who were 65 years of age or older. The median age was 40 years. For every 100 females, there were 97.9 males. For every 100 females age 18 and over, there were 97.7 males.

The median income for a household in the township was $34,712, and the median income for a family was $37,417. Males had a median income of $29,250 versus $20,833 for females. The per capita income for the township was $16,219. About 9.8% of families and 12.0% of the population were below the poverty line, including 17.4% of those under age 18 and 6.4% of those age 65 or over.

== Communities and locations in Delmar Township ==
- Dexter – A village on Pennsylvania Route 660 in the western part of the township.
- Draper – A village in the south-central part of the township.
- Heise Run – A village on U.S. Route 6 in the northern part of the township.
- Kennedy – A village in the southwestern part of the township.
- Knapp – A village on Pennsylvania Route 287 in the southeastern part of the township.
- Lake Nessmuk – A small lake along Pennsylvania Route 287, just south of Wellsboro.
- Olmsville – A village in the southern part of the township, just west of Draper.
- Stokesdale – A village on U.S. Route 6, approximately two miles north of Wellsboro.
- Stony Fork – A village in the south-central part of the township, slightly north of Draper.
- Sweetbriar – A village on Pennsylvania Route 287 in the southeastern corner of the township.
- Thumptown – A village on Pennsylvania Route 660 near the western township line.
- Tiadaghton – A village in the southwestern corner of the township near the Pine Creek Gorge.
- Tioga State Forest – The Tioga State Forest covers much of northwestern Delmar Township.
- Wellsboro – A borough in the eastern part of the township, located at the junctions of Pennsylvania Route 660, Pennsylvania Route 287, and U.S. Route 6. It is the county seat of Tioga County.
- Wellsboro Junction – A village on the Wellsboro and Corning Railroad, approximately one mile north of Stokesdale.
