= Colton Point State Park =

State park in Pennsylvania, US

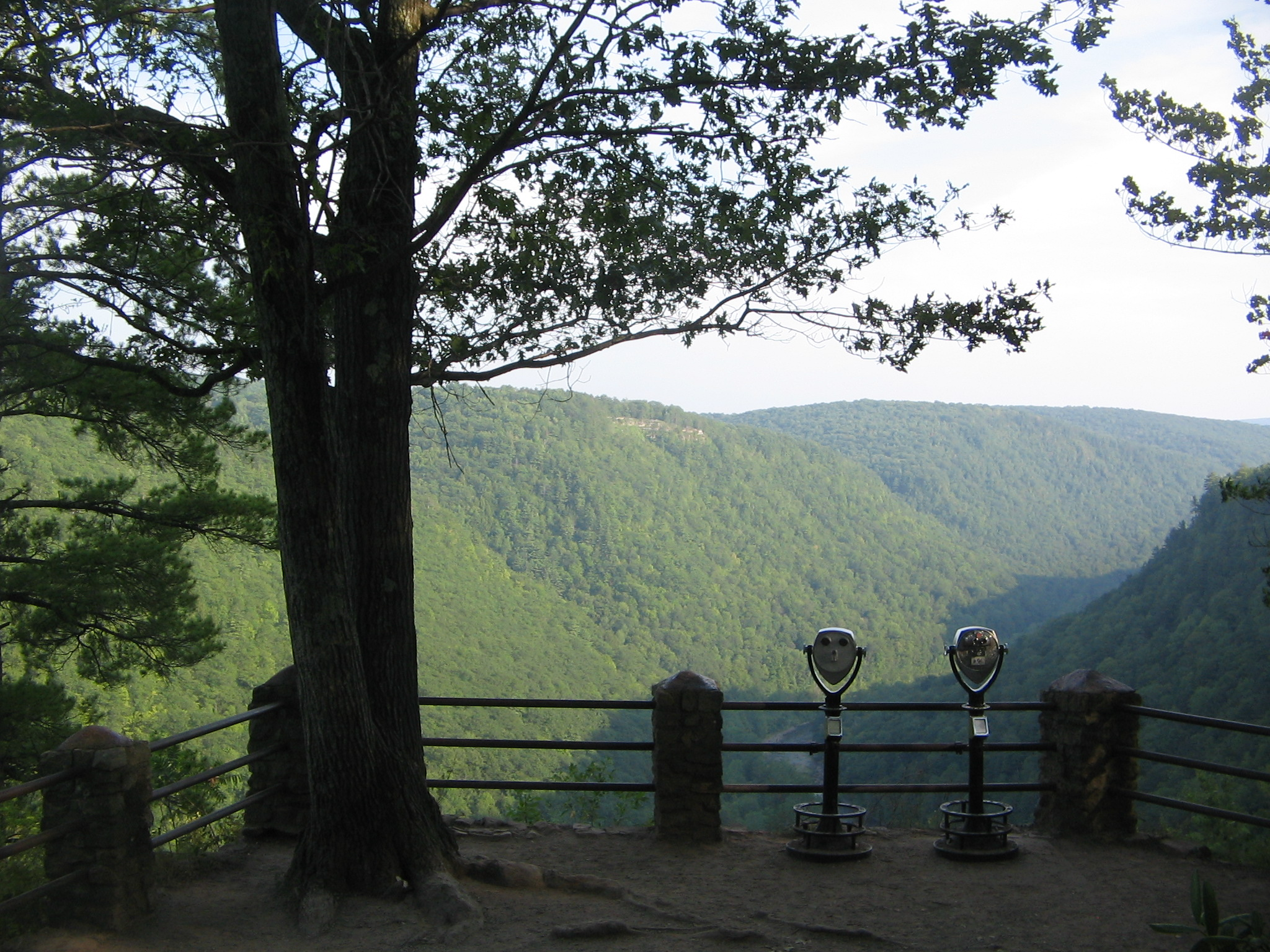
- CCC-built overlook looking south into Pine Creek Gorge

- Location within Pennsylvania Location within the United States
- Interactive map of Colton Point State Park
- Location: Shippen Township, Tioga County, Pennsylvania, United States
- Coordinates: 41°42′30″N 77°27′19″W
- Area: 368 acres (149 ha)
- Elevation: 1,637 ft (499 m)
- Established: 1936
- Administrator: Pennsylvania Department of Conservation and Natural Resources
- Visitors: 87,423
- Named for: Henry Colton
- Website: Official website
- Pennsylvania State Parks

Colton Point State Park is a 368-acre (149 ha) Pennsylvania state park in Tioga County, Pennsylvania, in the United States. It is on the west side of the Pine Creek Gorge, also known as the Grand Canyon of Pennsylvania, which is 800 feet (240 m) deep and nearly 4,000 feet (1,200 m) across at this location. The park extends from the creek in the bottom of the gorge up to the rim and across part of the plateau to the west. Colton Point State Park is known for its views of the Pine Creek Gorge, and offers opportunities for picnicking, hiking, fishing and hunting, whitewater boating, and camping. Colton Point is surrounded by Tioga State Forest and its sister park, Leonard Harrison State Park, on the east rim. The park is on a state forest road in Shippen Township 5 miles (8 km) south of U.S. Route 6.

Pine Creek flows through the park and has carved the gorge through five major rock formations from the Devonian and Carboniferous periods. Native Americans once used the Pine Creek Path along the creek. The path was later used by lumbermen, and then became the course of a railroad from 1883 to 1988. Since 1996, the 62-mile (100 km) Pine Creek Rail Trail has followed the creek through the gorge. The Pine Creek Gorge was named a National Natural Landmark in 1968 and is also protected as a Pennsylvania State Natural Area and Important Bird Area, while Pine Creek is a Pennsylvania Scenic and Wild River. The gorge is home to many species of plants and animals, some of which have been reintroduced to the area.

The park is named for Henry Colton, a Williamsport lumberman who cut timber there starting in 1879. Although the Pine Creek Gorge was clearcut in the 19th and early 20th centuries, it is now covered by second-growth forest, thanks in part to the conservation efforts of the Civilian Conservation Corps (CCC) in the 1930s. The CCC built the facilities at Colton Point before and shortly after the park's 1936 opening. Most of the CCC-built facilities remain in use, and have led to the park's listing as a historic district on the National Register of Historic Places. Since a successful publicity campaign in 1936, the park and gorge have been a popular tourist destination, attracting hundreds of thousands of visitors each year. Colton Point State Park was chosen by the Pennsylvania Department of Conservation and Natural Resources (DCNR) Bureau of Parks for its "25 Must-See Pennsylvania State Parks" list, which praised its "spectacular vistas and a fabulous view of Pine Creek Gorge".

== History ==
=== Native Americans ===
Humans have lived in what is now Pennsylvania since at least 10,000 BC. The first settlers were Paleo-Indian nomadic hunters known from their stone tools. The hunter-gatherers of the Archaic period, which lasted locally from 7000 to 1000 BC, used a greater variety of more sophisticated stone artifacts. The Woodland period marked the gradual transition to semi-permanent villages and horticulture, between 1000 BC and 1500 AD. Archeological evidence found in the state from this time includes a range of pottery types and styles, burial mounds, pipes, bows and arrows, and ornaments.

Colton Point State Park is in the West Branch Susquehanna River drainage basin, the earliest recorded inhabitants of which were the Iroquoian-speaking Susquehannocks.^{[a]} They were a matriarchal society that lived in stockaded villages of large long houses, and "occasionally inhabited" the mountains surrounding the Pine Creek Gorge. Their numbers were greatly reduced by disease and warfare with the Five Nations of the Iroquois, and by 1675 they had died out, moved away, or been assimilated into other tribes.

After this, the lands of the West Branch Susquehanna River valley were under the nominal control of the Iroquois. The Iroquois lived in long houses, primarily in what is now New York, and had a strong confederacy which gave them power beyond their numbers. They and other tribes used the Pine Creek Path through the gorge, traveling between a path on the Genesee River in modern New York in the north, and the Great Shamokin Path along the West Branch Susquehanna River in the south. The Seneca tribe of the Iroquois believed that Pine Creek Gorge was sacred land and never established a permanent settlement there. They used the path through the gorge and had seasonal hunting camps along it, including one just north of the park near what would later be the village of Ansonia. To fill the void left by the demise of the Susquehannocks, the Iroquois encouraged displaced tribes from the east to settle in the West Branch watershed, including the Shawnee and Lenape (or Delaware).

The French and Indian War (1754–1763) led to the migration of many Native Americans westward to the Ohio River basin. On November 5, 1768, the British acquired the New Purchase from the Iroquois in the Treaty of Fort Stanwix, including what is now the Pine Creek Gorge east of the creek. The Purchase line established by this treaty was disputed, as it was unclear whether the border along "Tiadaghton Creek" referred to Pine Creek or to Lycoming Creek, further to the east. As a result, the land between them was disputed territory until 1784 and the Second Treaty of Fort Stanwix. After the American Revolutionary War, Native Americans almost entirely left Pennsylvania; some isolated bands of natives remained in Pine Creek Gorge until the War of 1812.

=== Lumber era ===
Prior to the arrival of William Penn and his Quaker colonists in 1682, up to 90 percent of what is now Pennsylvania was covered with woods: more than 31,000 square miles (80,000 km^{2}) of eastern white pine, eastern hemlock, and a mix of hardwoods. The forests near the three original counties, Philadelphia, Bucks, and Chester, were the first to be harvested, as the early settlers used the readily available timber and cleared land for agriculture. By the time of the American Revolution, logging had reached the interior and mountainous regions, and became a leading industry in Pennsylvania. Trees furnished fuel to heat homes, tannin for the state's many tanneries, and wood for construction, furniture, and barrel making. Large areas of forest were harvested by colliers to fire iron furnaces. Rifle stocks and shingles were made from Pennsylvania timber, as were a wide variety of household utensils, and the first Conestoga wagons.

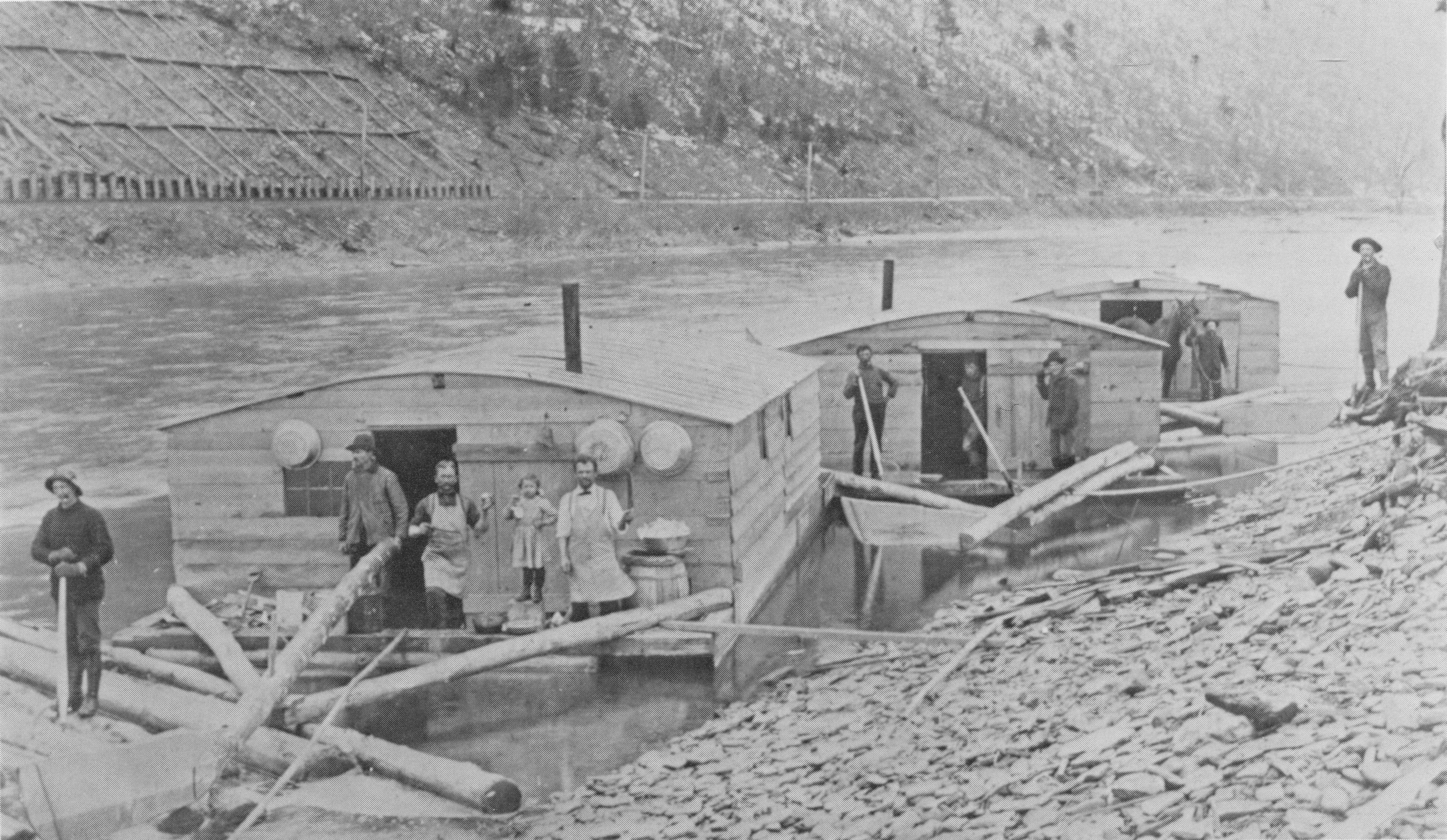
Pine Creek lumber drive, with arks for kitchen and dining (left), sleeping (center), and horses (right): the railroad is on the shore behind.

By the early 19th century the demand for lumber reached the Pine Creek Gorge, where the surrounding mountainsides were covered with eastern white pine 3 to 6 feet (1 to 2 m) in diameter and 150 feet (50 m) or more tall, eastern hemlock 9 feet (3 m) in circumference, and huge hardwoods. Each acre (0.4 ha) of these virgin forests produced 100,000 board feet (200 m^{3}) of white pine and 200,000 board feet (500 m^{3}) of hemlock and hardwoods. For comparison, the same area of forest today produces a total of only 5,000 board feet (10 m^{3}) on average. According to Steven E. Owlett, environmental lawyer and author, shipbuilders considered pine from Pine Creek the "best timber in the world for making fine ship masts", so it was the first lumber to be harvested on a large scale. The original title to the land that became Colton Point State Park was sold to the Wilhelm Wilkins Company in 1792. Pine Creek was declared a public highway by the Pennsylvania General Assembly on March 16, 1798, and rafts of spars were floated down the creek to the Susquehanna River, then to the Chesapeake Bay and the shipbuilders at Baltimore.^{[b]} The lumbermen would then walk home, following the old Pine Creek Path at the end of their journey.

As the 19th century progressed, fewer pines were left and more hemlocks and hardwoods were cut and processed locally. By 1810 there were 11 sawmills in the Pine Creek watershed, and by 1840 there were 145, despite a flood in 1832 which wiped out nearly all the mills along the creek. Selective harvesting of pines was replaced by clearcutting of all lumber in a tract. The first lumbering activity close to what is now Colton Point was in 1838 when William Dodge and partners built a settlement at Big Meadows and formed the Pennsylvania Joint Land and Lumber Company. Dodge's company purchased thousands of acres of land in the area, including what is now Colton Point State Park. In 1865 the last pine spar raft floated down the creek, and on March 28, 1871, the General Assembly passed a law which allowed construction of splash dams and allowed creeks to be cleared to allow loose logs to float better. The earliest spring log drives floated up to 20,000,000 board feet (50,000 m^{3}) of logs in Pine Creek at one time. These logs floated to the West Branch Susquehanna River and to sawmills near the Susquehanna Boom at Williamsport. Log drives could be dangerous: just north of the park is Barbour Rock, named for Samuel Barbour, who lost his life on Pine Creek there after breaking up a log jam. Hemlock wood was not widely used until the advent of wire nails, but the bark was used to tan leather. After 1870 the largest tanneries in the world were in the Pine Creek watershed, and required 2,000 pounds (900 kg) of bark to produce 150 pounds (70 kg) of quality sole leather.

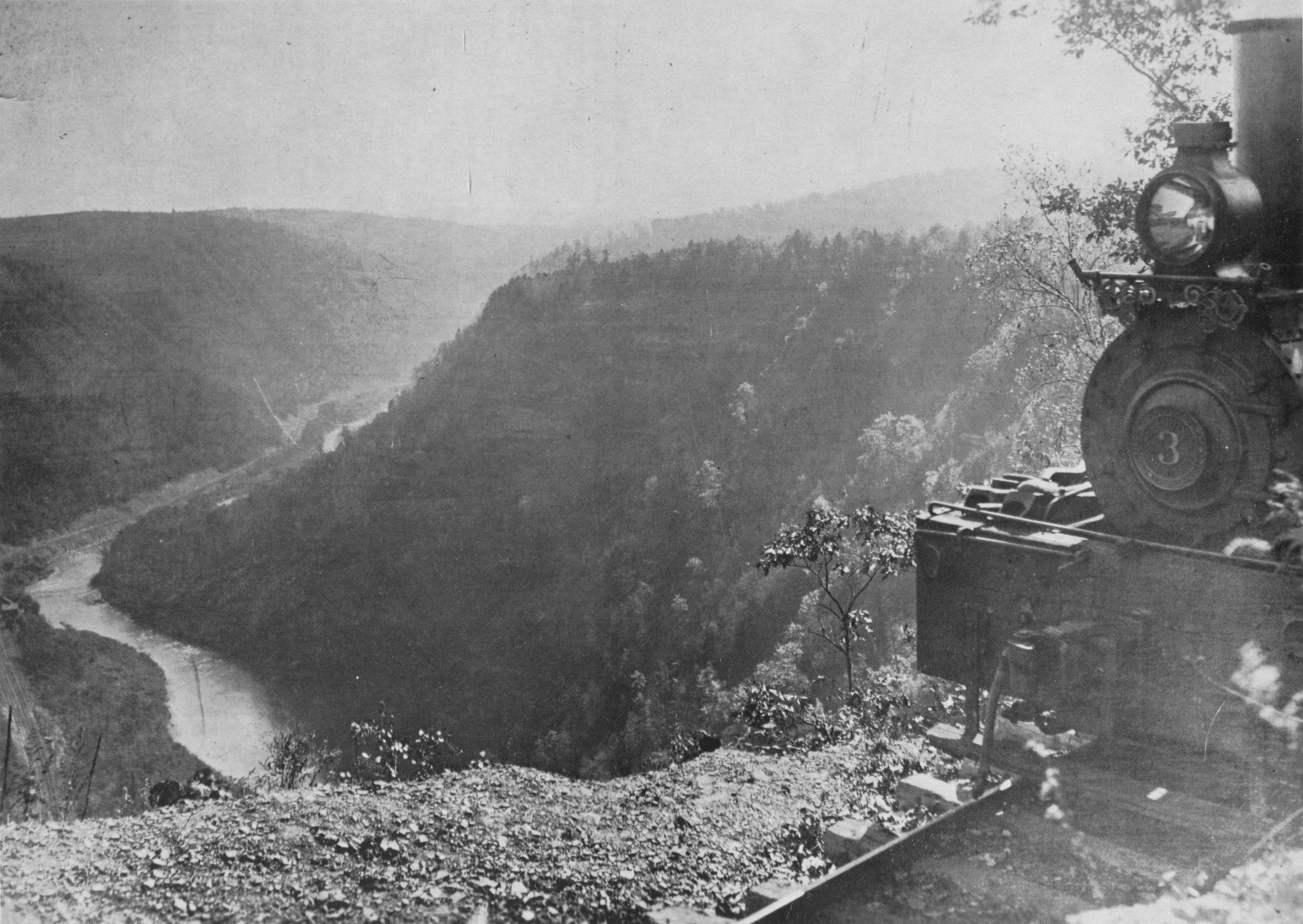
A Shay locomotive from the Leetonia lumber railroad and the nearly clearcut Pine Creek Gorge, at one of the lookouts in what is now the park.

In 1879 Henry Colton, who worked for the Williamsport Lumber Company, supervised the cutting of white pine on the land owned by Silas Billings; this land would later become the park.^{[c]} Colton gave his name to the Colton Point overlook on the west rim of the Pine Creek Gorge. Deadman Hollow Road in the park is named for a trapper whose decomposed body was found in his own bear trap there in the early 20th century. Fourmile Run flows through the park: its O'Connor Branch is named for the dead trapper's brothers, who were loggers in the area.

In 1883 the Jersey Shore, Pine Creek and Buffalo Railway opened, following the creek through the gorge. The new railroad used the relatively level route along Pine Creek to link the New York Central Railroad (NYC) to the north with the Clearfield Coalfield to the southwest, and with NYC-allied lines in Williamsport to the southeast. By 1896 the rail line's daily traffic included three passenger trains and 7,000,000 short tons (6,400,000 t) of freight. In the surrounding forests, log drives gave way to logging railroads, which transported lumber to local sawmills. There were 13 companies operating logging railroads along Pine Creek and its tributaries between 1886 and 1921, while the last log drive in the Pine Creek watershed started on Little Pine Creek in 1905. By 1900 the Leetonia logging railroad was extended to the headwaters of Fourmile Run, which has several high waterfalls that prevented logs from being floated down it. In 1903 the line reached Colton Point and Bear Run, which is the northern border of the park today. Lumber on Fourmile Run that had been previously inaccessible was harvested and transported by train, initially to Leonard Harrison's mill at Tiadaghton. When that mill burned in 1905, the lumber went to the Leetonia mill on Cedar Run in Elk Township.

The old-growth forests were clearcut by the early 20th century and the gorge was stripped bare. Nothing was left except the dried-out tree tops, which became a fire hazard. As a result, much of the land burned and was left barren. On May 6, 1903, the Wellsboro newspaper had the headline "Wild Lands Aflame" and reported landslides through the gorge. The soil was depleted of nutrients, fires baked the ground hard, and jungles of blueberries, blackberries, and mountain laurel covered the clearcut land, which became known as the "Pennsylvania Desert". Floods swept the area periodically and much of the wildlife was wiped out.

=== Conservation ===
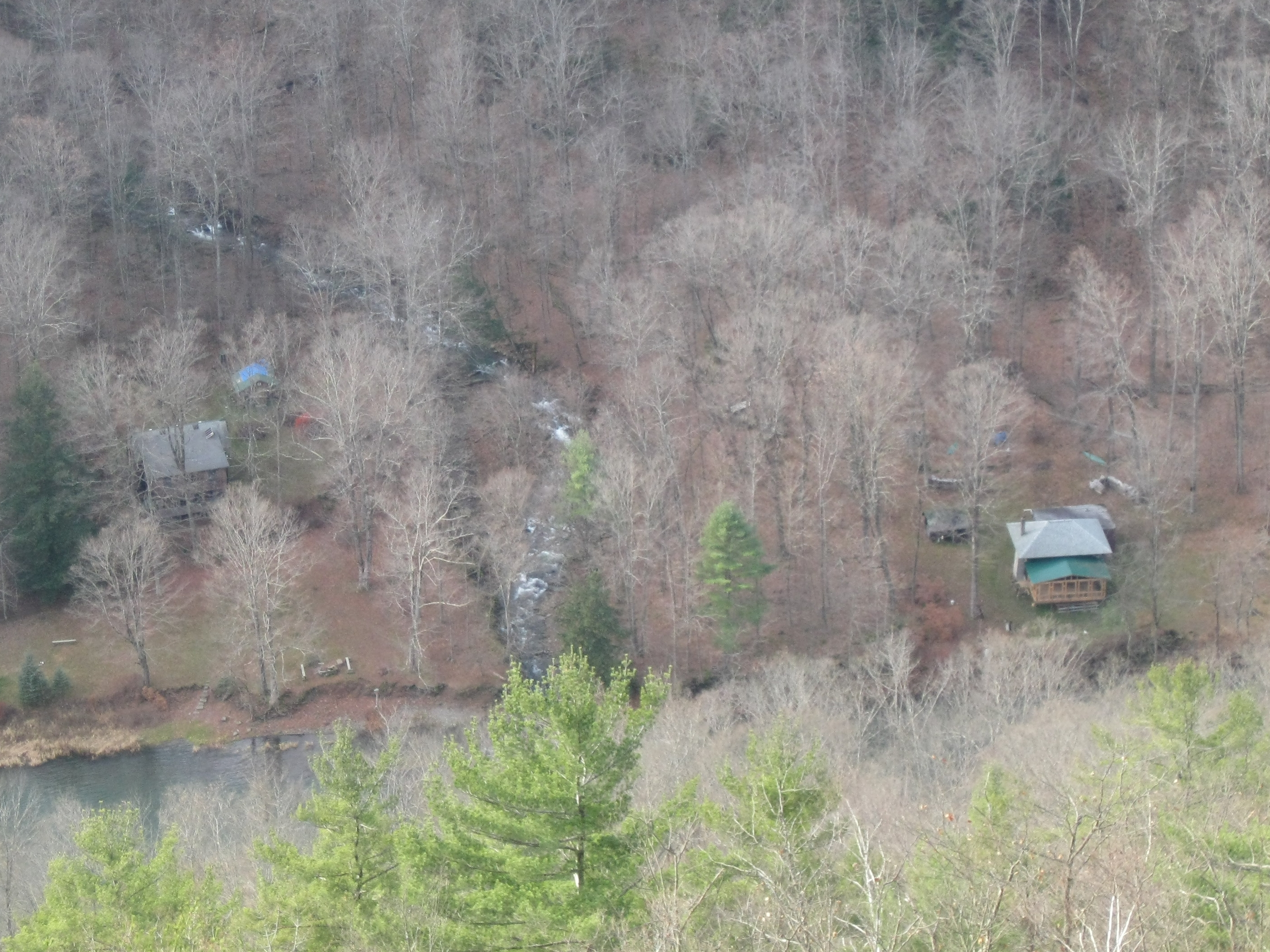
The cabins on either side of Fourmile Run along Pine Creek, as seen from Leonard Harrison State Park

George Washington Sears, an early conservationist who wrote under the pen name "Nessmuk", was one of the first to criticize the Pennsylvania lumber industry and its destruction of forests and creeks. In his 1884 book Woodcraft he wrote of the Pine Creek watershed where

A huge tannery ... poisons and blackens the stream with chemicals, bark and ooze. ... The once fine covers and thickets are converted into fields thickly dotted with blackened stumps. And, to crown the desolation, heavy laden trains of 'The Pine Creek and Jersey Shore R.R.' go thundering [by] almost hourly ... Of course, this is progress; but, whether backward or forward, had better be decided sixty years hence.

Nessmuk's words went mostly unheeded in his lifetime and did not prevent the clearcutting of almost all the virgin forests in Pennsylvania.

Sears lived in Wellsboro from 1844 until his death in 1890, and was the first to describe the Pine Creek Gorge. He also described a trip to what became Leonard Harrison State Park and the view west across the gorge to what became Colton Point State Park: after a 6-mile (10 km) buggy ride, he had to hike 7 miles (11 km) through tangles of fallen trees and branches, down ravines, and over banks for five hours. At last he reached "The Point", which he wrote was "the jutting terminus of a high ridge which not only commands a capital view of the opposite mountain, but also of the Pine Creek Valley, up and down for miles".

The land on which Colton Point State Park sits was sold to the Commonwealth in the late 19th century for $2.50 per acre ($6.18/ha) by the Pennsylvania Joint Land and Lumber Company, which had no further use for it. Elsewhere in the gorge the state bought land abandoned by lumber companies, sometimes for less than $2 per acre ($4.94/ha). These purchases became the Tioga State Forest, which was officially established in 1925. As of 2015 the state forest encompasses 165,052 acres (66,794 ha), mostly in Tioga County, and surrounds Colton Point State Park to the north, west, and south. Leonard Harrison State Park is on the eastern border of Colton Point. In 1922, Wellsboro lumber baron Leonard Harrison donated his picnic grounds on the eastern rim of the gorge to the Commonwealth of Pennsylvania, which named it "Leonard Harrison State Forest Park".

Harrison also built two cabins, named "Wetumka" and "Osocosy", on the west side of Pine Creek, just north of the mouth of Fourmile Run. Sometime after 1903, former Pennsylvania Governor William A. Stone built a cabin named "Heart's-ease" just south of the mouth of Fourmile Run. In 1966 these cabins were still standing and were three of "only four man-made structures inside the canyon proper", but by 1993 only Stone's cabin and one of Harrison's cabins remained. As of 2004, these properties were still owned by the Stone family, and are part of a small parcel of private land within the park.

=== Modern era ===
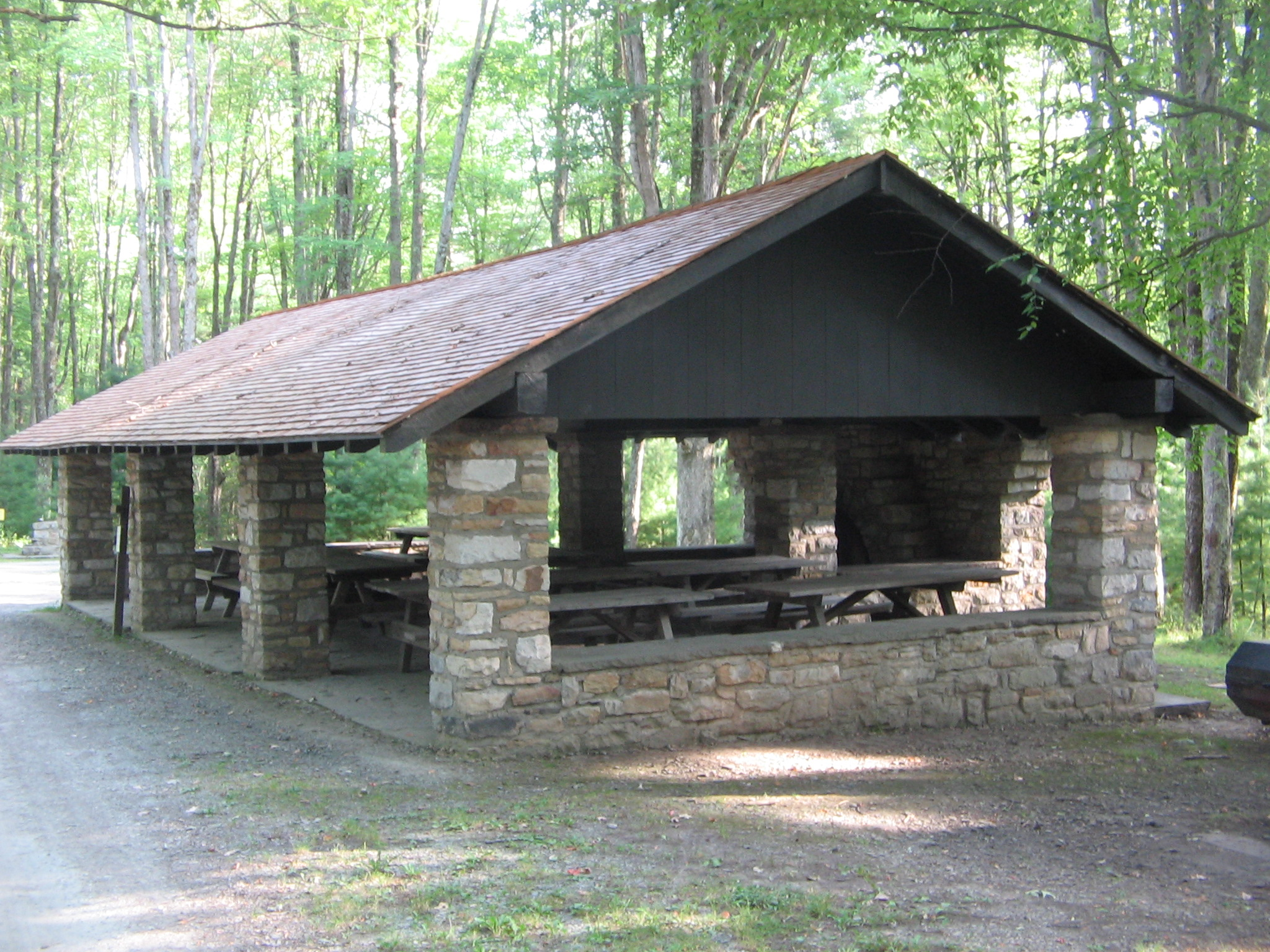
CCC-built shelter 3 in the park

The Civilian Conservation Corps (CCC) started work on the park in June 1935, and it opened as "Colton Point State Forest Park" in 1936. The CCC, founded by United States President Franklin D. Roosevelt during the Great Depression, created jobs for unemployed young men from throughout the United States. Much of the work of the CCC at Colton Point is still visible as of 2015, and is one of many examples of the work of the CCC throughout northcentral Pennsylvania.

In 1936, the year the park opened, Larry Woodin of Wellsboro and other Tioga County business owners began a tourism campaign to promote the Pine Creek Gorge as "The Grand Canyon of Pennsylvania". Greyhound Bus Lines featured a view of the canyon from a Leonard Harrison lookout on the back cover of its Atlantic Coast timetable. The bus line's Chicago to New York City tour had an overnight stay in Wellsboro and a morning visit to the canyon for $3. More than 300,000 tourists visited the canyon by the autumn of 1936, and 15,000 visited Leonard Harrison over Memorial Day weekend in 1937. That year more visitors came to the Pine Creek Gorge than to Yellowstone National Park. In response to the heavy use of the local roads, the CCC widened the highways in the area, and guides from the CCC gave tours of the canyon.

Colton Point originally opened with only "limited facilities", but the success of the tourism campaign led to the park's expansion by the CCC. New facilities were added in 1938, and included buildings such as picnic pavilions, latrines, and a concession stand, as well as "stone cook stoves, tables, and developed trails and overlooks ... an amazing amount of work in one year". The CCC also built the road to the park and planted stands of larch, spruce and white pine for reforestation. On February 12, 1987, the entire 368-acre (149 ha) park was listed in the National Register of Historic Places (NRHP), including "eight buildings and nine structures".

The park has five CCC-built picnic shelters: pavilions 1, 3, and 4 are made of stone and timber with stone fireplaces, while pavilions 2 and 5 each has log columns that support a pyramidal roof. The CCC also built six rustic latrines with clapboard siding and gable roofs, and an underground reservoir that is covered with a low hipped roof. Additional structures constructed by the CCC include three overlooks and a rectangular gable-roofed maintenance building with wane edge siding and exposed rafters made of logs. The structures built by the CCC are noteworthy in that they exemplify the rustic style of construction that was prevalent at national and state parks built during the Great Depression. Workers used locally found, natural materials in construction that blended with the natural surroundings. Not all of the CCC's work has survived. A concession stand was built by the CCC and sold food and souvenirs from the late 1930s to at least 1953, but was not listed on the 1986 NRHP nomination form. The CCC also built a brick and stone incinerator, but it is in ruins now.

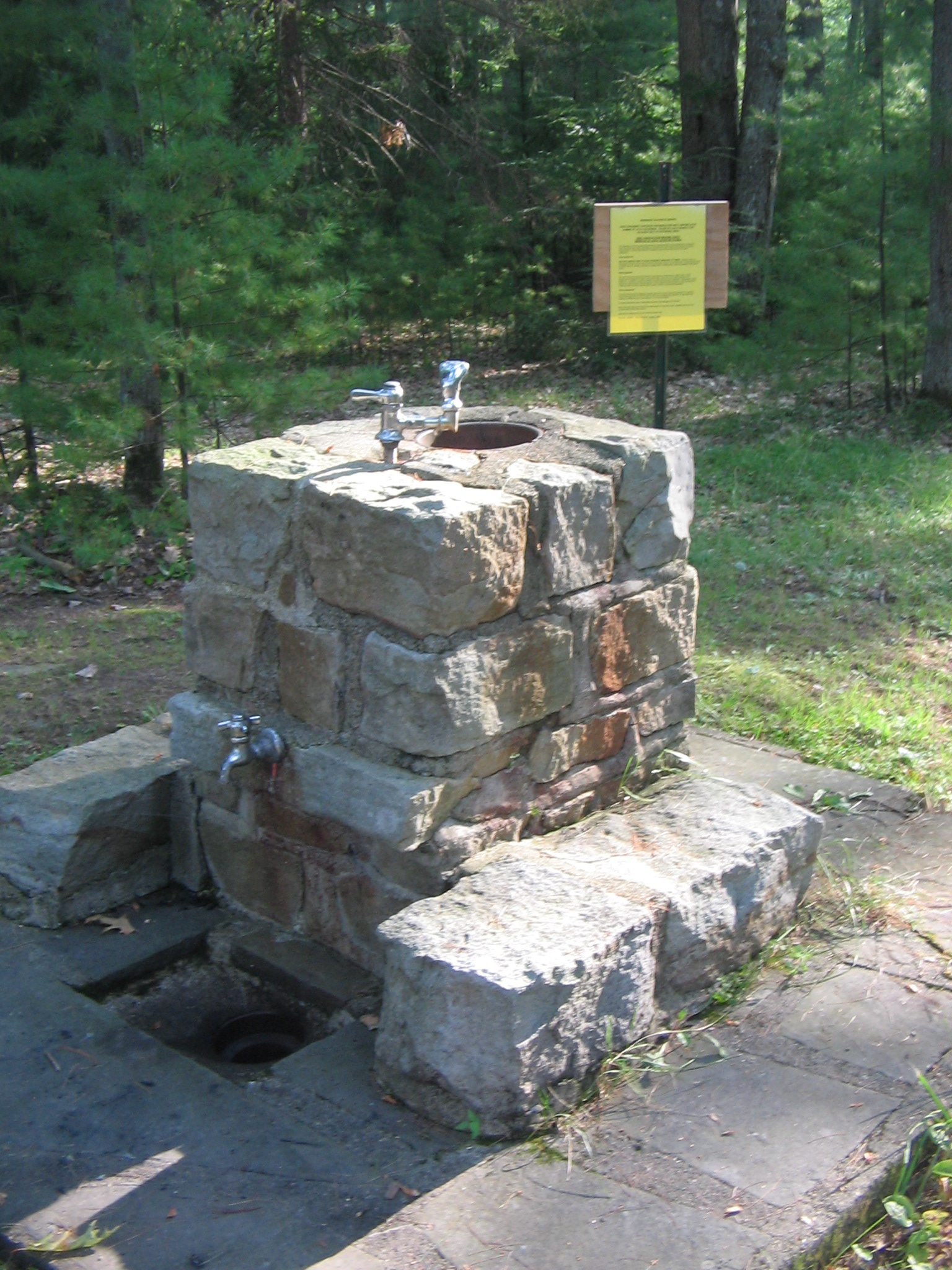
This water fountain was built by the CCC with native stone.

The Pennsylvania Geographic Board dropped the word "Forest" and officially named it "Colton Point State Park" on November 11, 1954. The first major change in the park was in 1970, when a camping area was established. That same decade saw the completion of a new water system in 1973, and a holding tank dump station was added to the camping area in 1977. A park office was built in 1983, but as of 2009 the park headquarters are in the adjoining Leonard Harrison State Park and the Colton Point office does not appear on the official park map. Pine Creek was named a state scenic river on December 4, 1992, which ensured further protection of Pine Creek Gorge in its natural state. In 1997 the park's Important Bird Area (IBA) was one of the first 73 IBAs established in Pennsylvania. In 2000 the park became part of the Hills Creek State Park complex, an administrative grouping of eight state parks in Potter and Tioga counties. As of 2004, the park does not have telephone or electrical lines, although it uses solar cells for limited electricity needs.

The second half of the 20th century also saw significant changes to the rail line through the Pine Creek Gorge. Regular passenger service on the canyon line ended after the Second World War, and in 1960 the second set of train tracks was removed. Conrail abandoned the section of the railroad that passed through the gorge on September 21, 1988. The right-of-way eventually became the Pine Creek Rail Trail, which follows the path of the former Pine Creek Path. The first section of the rail trail opened in 1996 and included the 1-mile (1.6 km) section in the park: as of 2015 the Pine Creek Rail Trail is 62 miles (100 km) long.

Colton Point State Park continued to attract national attention in the post-war era. The New York Times featured the park and its "breath-taking views of the gorge" as well as its trails and location in the wilds of the state forest in a 1950 article, and in 1966 praised the whitewater boating on Pine Creek and the park's "outstanding look-out points". The Pine Creek Gorge, including Colton Point and Leonard Harrison State Parks and a 12-mile (19 km) section of Tioga State Forest, was named a National Natural Landmark (NNL) in April 1968. A 1973 New York Times article on whitewater canoeing noted the damage along Pine Creek done by Hurricane Agnes the year before. Another Times story in 2002 noted the park for its beauty and wildlife, and cited it as a starting point for hiking the West Rim Trail.

In the new millennium, the two state parks on either side of the Pine Creek Gorge are frequently treated as one. A 2002 New York Times article called Colton Point and Leonard Harrison state parks "Two State Parks, Divided by a Canyon" and noted their "overlooks offer the most spectacular views". Colton Point and Leonard Harrison were each included in the list of state parks chosen by the DCNR Pennsylvania Bureau of Parks for its "25 Must-See Pennsylvania State Parks" list. The DCNR describes how they "offer spectacular vistas and a fabulous view of Pine Creek Gorge, also known as Pennsylvania's Grand Canyon". It goes on to praise their inclusion in a National Natural Landmark and State Park Natural Area, hiking and trails, and the Pine Creek Rail Trail and bicycling.

== Pine Creek Gorge ==
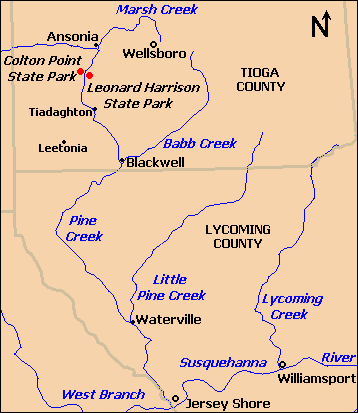
Map showing the park and important locations in its history in the Pine Creek Gorge and Tioga and Lycoming Counties

Colton Point State Park lies on the west side of the Pine Creek Gorge, also known as the Grand Canyon of Pennsylvania. A sister park, Leonard Harrison State Park, is on the east side, and the two parks combined form essentially one large park that includes parts of the gorge and creek and parts of the plateau dissected by the gorge. Pine Creek has carved the gorge nearly 47 miles (76 km) through the dissected Allegheny Plateau in northcentral Pennsylvania. The canyon begins in southwestern Tioga County, just south of the village of Ansonia, and continues south to near the village of Waterville in Lycoming County. The depth of the gorge in Colton Point State Park is about 800 feet (240 m) and it measures nearly 4,000 feet (1,200 m) across.

The Pine Creek Gorge National Natural Landmark includes Colton Point and Leonard Harrison State Parks and parts of the Tioga State Forest along 12 miles (19 km) of Pine Creek between Ansonia and Blackwell. This federal program does not provide any extra protection beyond that offered by the land owner. The National Park Service's designation of the gorge as a National Natural Landmark notes that it "contains superlative scenery, geological and ecological value, and is one of the finest examples of a deep gorge in the eastern United States."

The gorge is also protected by the state of Pennsylvania as the 12,163-acre (4,922 ha) Pine Creek Gorge Natural Area, which is the second largest State Natural Area in Pennsylvania. Within this area, 699 acres (283 ha) of Colton Point and Leonard Harrison State Parks are designated a State Park Natural Area. The state Natural Area runs along Pine Creek from Darling Run in the north (just below Ansonia) to Jerry Run in the south (just above Blackwell). It is approximately 12 miles (19 km) long and 2 miles (3 km) wide, with state forest roads providing all of the western border and part of the eastern border.

Within the park, Pine Creek and the walls of the gorge "visible from the opposite shoreline" are also protected by the state as a Pennsylvania Scenic River. In 1968 Pine Creek was one of only 27 rivers originally designated as eligible to be included in the National Wild and Scenic Rivers System, and one of only eight specifically mentioned in the law establishing the program. Before Pine Creek could be included in the federal program, the state enacted its State Scenic Rivers Act, then asked that Pine Creek be withdrawn from the national designation. There was much local opposition to its inclusion, based at least partly on mistaken fears that protection would involve seizure of private property and restricted access. Eventually this opposition was overcome, but Pennsylvania did not officially include it as one of its own state Scenic and Wild Rivers until November 25, 1992. The state treated Pine Creek as a state scenic river between 1968 and 1992. It protected the creek from dam-building and water withdrawals for power plants, and added public access points to reduce trespassing on private property by visitors to the creek.

== Geology and climate ==
Although the rock formations exposed in Colton Point State Park and the Pine Creek Gorge are at least 300 million years old, the gorge itself formed about 20,000 years ago, in the last ice age. Pine Creek had flowed northeasterly until then, but was dammed by rocks, soil, ice, and other debris deposited by the receding Laurentide Continental Glacier. The dammed creek formed a lake near what would later be the village of Ansonia, and the lake's glacial meltwater overflowed the debris dam, reversing the flow of Pine Creek. The creek flooded to the south and quickly carved a deep channel on its way to the West Branch Susquehanna River.

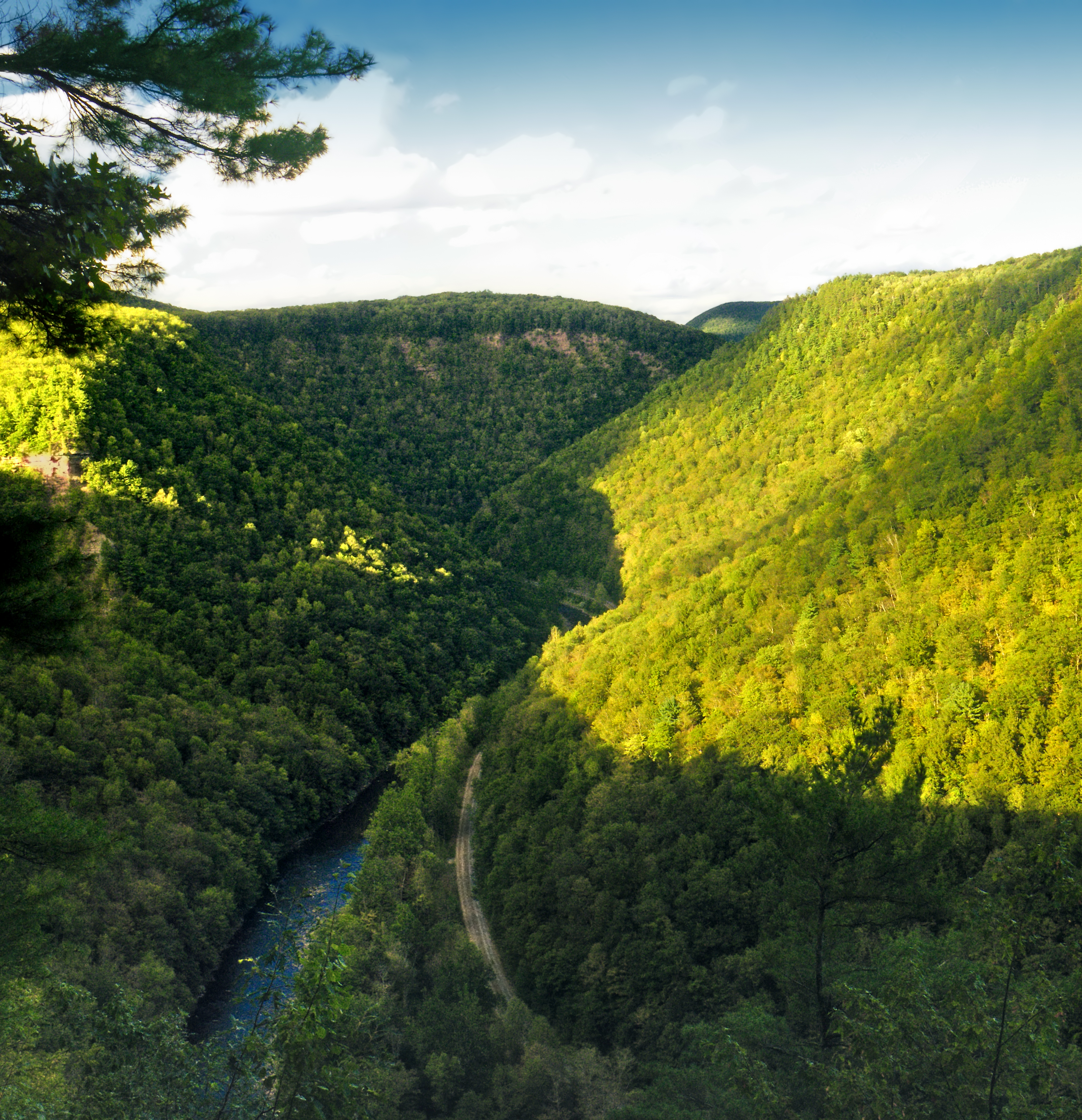
Looking north to Barbour Rock (left) and other rock outcrops in the Pine Creek Gorge

The park is at an elevation of 1,637 feet (499 m) on the Allegheny Plateau, which formed in the Alleghenian orogeny some 300 million years ago, when Gondwana (specifically what became Africa) and what became North America collided, forming Pangaea. Although the gorge and its surroundings seem to be mountainous, the area is a dissected plateau. Years of erosion have cut away the soft rocks, forming the valleys, and left the hardest of the ancient rocks relatively untouched on the top of sharp ridges, giving them the appearance of "mountains".

The land on which Colton Point State Park sits was once part of the coastline of a shallow sea that covered a great portion of what is now North America. The high mountains to the east of the sea gradually eroded, causing a buildup of sediment made up primarily of clay, sand and gravel. Tremendous pressure on the sediment caused the formation of the rocks that are found today in the Pine Creek drainage basin: sandstone, shale, conglomerates, limestone, and coal.

Five major rock formations present in Colton Point State Park are from the Devonian and Carboniferous periods. The youngest of these, which forms the highest points in the park and along the gorge, is the early Pennsylvanian Pottsville Formation, a gray conglomerate that may contain sandstone, siltstone, and shale, as well as anthracite coal. Low-sulfur coal was once mined at three locations within the Pine Creek watershed. Below this is the late Mississippian Mauch Chunk Formation, which is formed with grayish-red shale, siltstone, sandstone, and conglomerate. Millstones were once carved from the exposed sections of this conglomerate. Together the Pottsville and Mauch Chunk formations are some 300 feet (91 m) thick.

Next below these is the late Devonian and early Mississippian Huntley Mountain Formation, which is made of relatively soft grayish-red shale and olive-gray sandstone. This is relatively hard rock and forms many of the ridges. Below this is the red shale and siltstone of the Catskill Formation, about 760 feet (230 m) thick and some 375 million years old. This layer is relatively soft and easily eroded, which helped to form the Pine Creek Gorge. Cliffs formed by the Huntley Mountain and Catskill formations are visible north of the park at Barbour Rock. The lowest and oldest layer is the Lock Haven Formation, which is gray to green-brown siltstone and shale over 400 million years old. It forms the base of the gorge, contains marine fossils, and is up to 600 feet (180 m) thick.

The Allegheny Plateau has a continental climate, with occasional severe low temperatures in winter and average daily temperature ranges of 20 °F (11 °C) in winter and 26 °F (14 °C) in summer. The mean annual precipitation for the Pine Creek watershed is 36 to 42 inches (914 to 1,070 mm). The highest recorded temperature at the park was 104 °F (40 °C) in 1936, and the record low was −30 °F (−34 °C) in 1934.

Climate data for Colton Point State Park
Month	Jan	Feb	Mar	Apr	May	Jun	Jul	Aug	Sep	Oct	Nov	Dec	Year
Mean daily maximum °F (°C)	30 (−1)	33 (1)	41 (5)	54 (12)	65 (18)	73 (23)	77 (25)	76 (24)	68 (20)	58 (14)	45 (7)	34 (1)	55 (12)
Mean daily minimum °F (°C)	13 (−11)	15 (−9)	23 (−5)	33 (1)	43 (6)	52 (11)	56 (13)	54 (12)	48 (9)	38 (3)	30 (−1)	19 (−7)	35 (2)
Average precipitation inches (mm)	1.88 (48)	1.72 (44)	2.40 (61)	2.52 (64)	3.05 (77)	4.56 (116)	3.66 (93)	2.92 (74)	3.23 (82)	2.60 (66)	2.77 (70)	2.12 (54)	33.43 (849)
Source: The Weather Channel

== Ecology ==
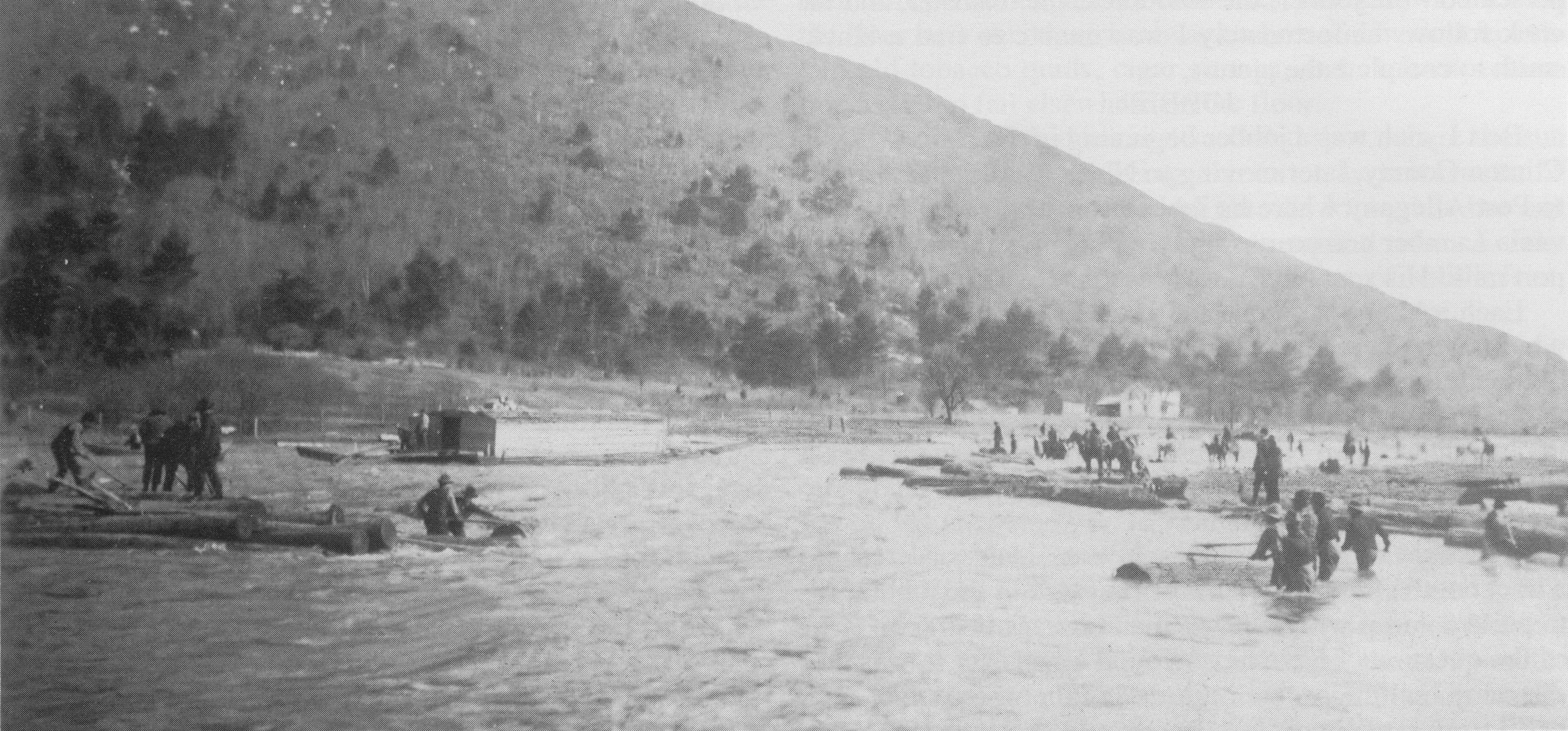
A log drive on Pine Creek. Clearcutting caused the "Pennsylvania Desert", local extinction of many species, and changes in seasonal stream flow.

Descriptions from early explorers and settlers give some idea of what the Pine Creek Gorge was like before it was clearcut. The forest was up to 85 percent hemlock and white pine; hardwoods made up the rest of the forest. The area was inhabited by a large number of animal species, many of which have vanished by the end of the 20th century. A herd of 12,000 American bison migrated along the West Branch Susquehanna River in 1773. Pine Creek was home to large predators such as wolves, lynx, wolverines, panthers, fishers, bobcats and foxes; all are locally extinct except for the last three as of 2007. The area had herds of elk and deer, and large numbers of black bears, river otters, and beavers. In 1794, two of the earliest white explorers to travel up Pine Creek found so many rattlesnakes on its banks that they had to sleep in their canoe. Further upstream, insects forced them to do the same.

The virgin forests cooled the land and streams. The creeks and runs flowed more evenly year-round, since centuries of accumulated organic matter in the forest soil caused slow percolation of rainfall into them. Pine Creek was home to large numbers of fish, including trout, but dams downstream on the Susquehanna River have eliminated the shad, salmon,^{[d]} and eels once found here by blocking their migrations. Habitat for land animals was destroyed by the clearcutting of forests, but there was also a great deal of hunting, with bounties paid for large predators.

=== State Natural Area and wildlife ===
While Colton Point and Leonard Harrison State Parks and parts of the surrounding Tioga State Forest are now the Pine Creek Gorge National Natural Landmark, it is their status as part of a Pennsylvania State Natural Area that provides the strongest protection for them. Within this Natural Area, logging, mining, and drilling for oil and gas are prohibited. Furthermore, only foot trail access is allowed. In 1988 the Pennsylvania Department of Environmental Resources, precursor to the DCNR, described it as

about 95% State owned, unroaded, and designated the Pine Creek Gorge Natural Area. It is a place of unique geologic history and contains some rare plant communities, an old growth hemlock stand, ... active bald eagle nest[s] ... and is a major site of river otter reintroduction. Departmental policy is protection of the natural values of the Canyon from development and overuse, and restoration of the area to as near a natural condition as possible.

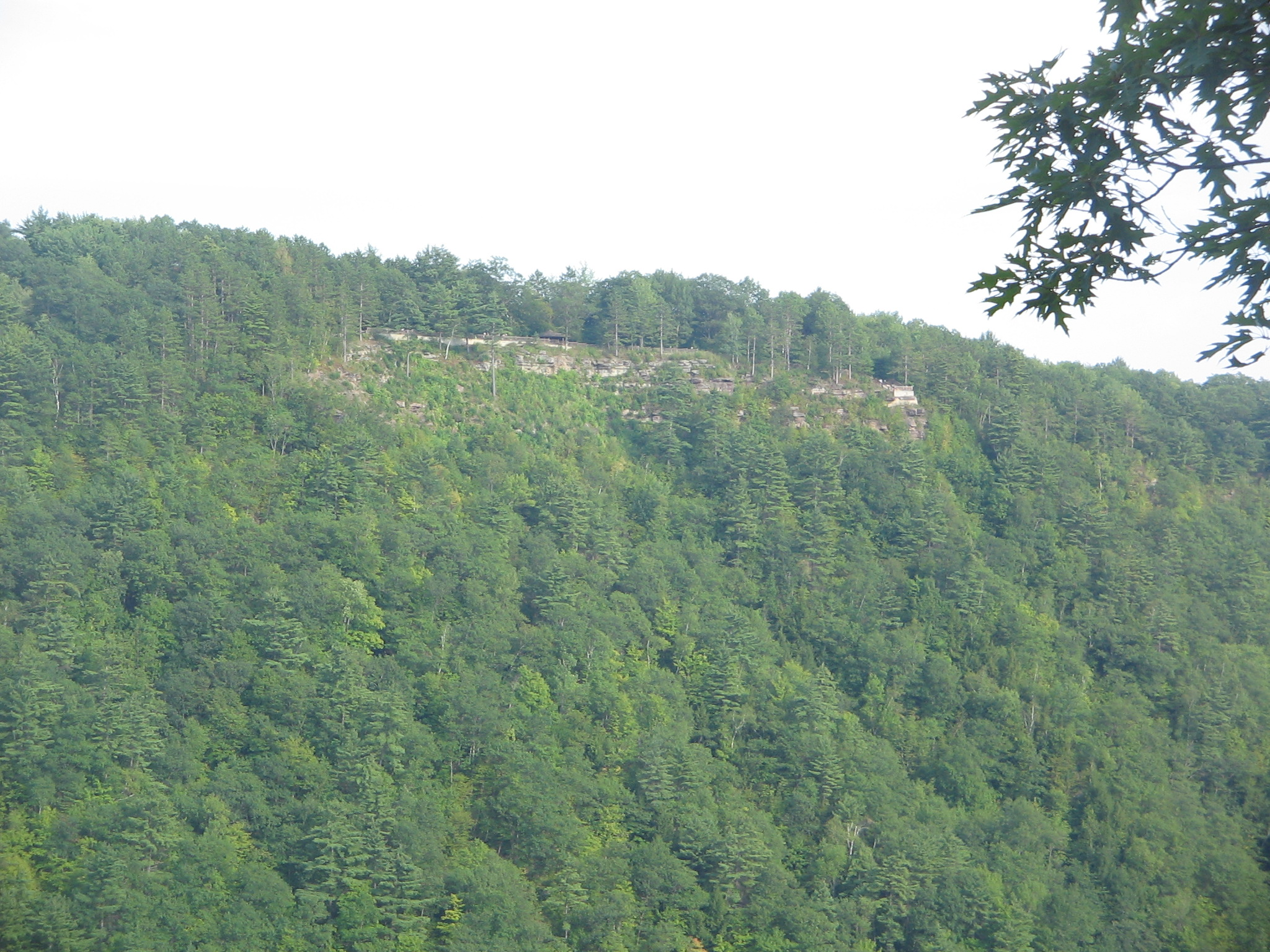
View southeast to the rock ledge and main overlook of Leonard Harrison State Park, another protected area in the Pine Creek Gorge.

The gorge has over 225 species of wildflowers, plants and trees, with scattered stands of old growth forest on some of its steepest walls. The rest of the gorge is covered with thriving second growth forest that can be over one hundred years old. Since clearcutting, nearly 90 percent of the forest land has burnt at least once. Typical south-facing slopes here have mountain laurel below oak and hickory trees, while north-facing slopes tend to have ferns below hemlocks and hardwoods. Large chestnuts and black cherry can also be found.

The Grand Canyon of Pennsylvania is known for its fall foliage, and Colton Point State Park is a popular place to observe the colors, with the first three weeks of October as the best time to see the leaves in their full color. Red leaves are found on red maple, black cherry, and red oak, while orange and yellow leaves are on black walnut, sugar maple, tulip poplar, chestnut oak, aspen and birch, and brown leaves are from beech, white oak, and eastern black oak trees. Despite the logging, there are some old-growth hardwoods and hemlocks on Fourmile Run. Plants of "special concern" in Pennsylvania that are found in the gorge include Jacob's ladder, wild pea, and hemlock parsley.

There are over 40 species of mammals in the Pine Creek Gorge. Colton Point State Park's extensive forest cover makes it a habitat for "big woods" wildlife, including white-tailed deer, black bear, wild turkey, red and gray squirrels. Less common creatures include bobcats, coyote, fishers, river otters, and timber rattlesnakes. There are over 26 species of fish in Pine Creek, including trout, suckers, fallfish, and rock bass. Other aquatic species include crayfish and frogs.

Several species have been reintroduced to the gorge. White-tailed deer were imported from Michigan and released throughout Pennsylvania to reestablish what had once been a thriving population. The current population of deer in Pennsylvania are descended from the original stock introduced since 1906, after the lumbermen had moved out of the area. The deer population has grown so much that today they exceed their carrying capacity in many areas. River otters were successfully reintroduced in 1983 and now breed in the gorge. Despite the otters' diet of 5 percent trout, some anglers fear the animals would deplete the game fish in the gorge.

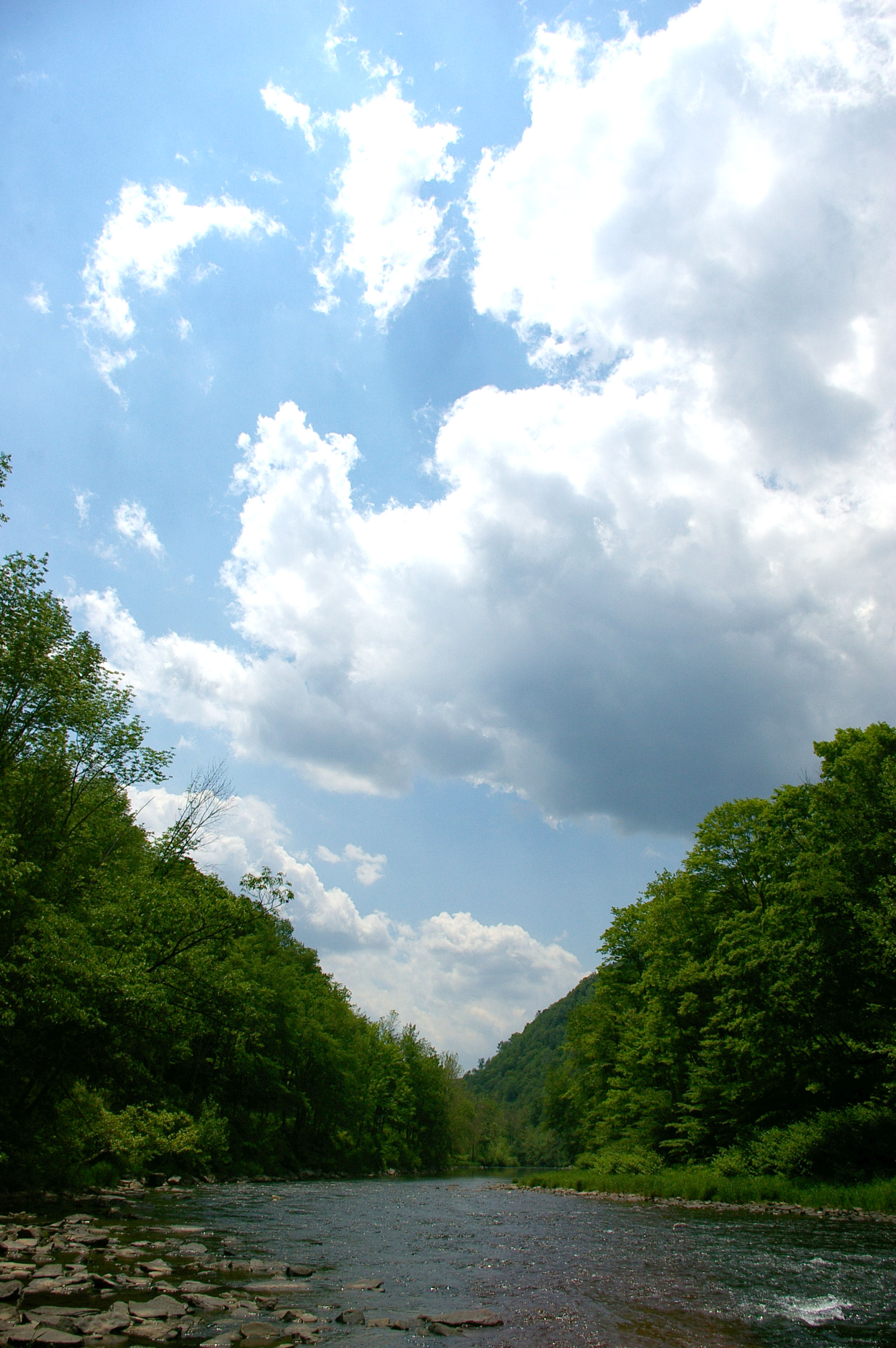
Pine Creek and the wooded slopes of the gorge in the park are important habitats.

Fishers, medium-sized weasels, were reintroduced to Pine Creek Gorge as part of an effort to establish a healthy population of fishers in Pennsylvania. Prior to the lumber era, fishers were numerous throughout the forests of Pennsylvania. They are generalized predators and will hunt any smaller creatures in their territory, including porcupines. Elk have been reintroduced west of the gorge in Clinton County and occasionally wander near the west rim of the canyon. Coyotes have come back on their own. Invasive insect species in the gorge include gypsy moth larvae, which eat all the leaves off trees, especially oaks, and hemlock woolly adelgids, which weaken and kill hemlocks. Invasive plant species include purple loosestrife and Japanese knotweed.

=== Important Bird Area ===
Colton Point State Park is part of Important Bird Area #28, which encompasses 31,790 acres (12,860 ha) of both publicly and private held land. State managed acreage accounts for 68 percent of the total area and includes Colton Point and Leonard Harrison State Parks and the surrounding Tioga State Forest lands. The Pennsylvania Audubon Society has designated all 368 acres (149 ha) of Colton Point State Park as part of the IBA, which is an area designated as a globally important habitat for the conservation of bird populations.

Ornithologists and bird watchers have recorded a total of 128 species of birds in the IBA. Several factors contribute to the high total of bird species observed: there is a large area of forest in the IBA, as well as great habitat diversity, with 343 acres (139 ha) of open water that is used by many of the birds, especially bald eagles. The location of the IBA along the Pine Creek Gorge also contributes to the diverse bird populations.

In addition to bald eagles, which live in the IBA year round and have successfully established a breeding population there, the IBA is home to belted kingfishers, scarlet tanagers, black-throated blue warblers, common mergansers, blue and green herons, hermit thrushes, and wood ducks. Large numbers of ospreys use the gorge during spring and fall migration periods. The woodlands are inhabited by wild turkeys and Pennsylvania's state bird the ruffed grouse. Swainson's thrush breeds in the IBA and the Northern harrier breeds and overwinters in Pine Creek Gorge.

A variety of warblers is found in Colton Point State Park. The Pennsylvania Audubon Society states that Pine Creek Gorge is "especially rich in warbler species, including Pine, Black-throated blue, Black-throated green, Blackburnian, and Black-and-white." Many of these smaller birds are more often heard than seen as they keep away from the trails and overlooks.

== Recreation ==
=== Trails ===
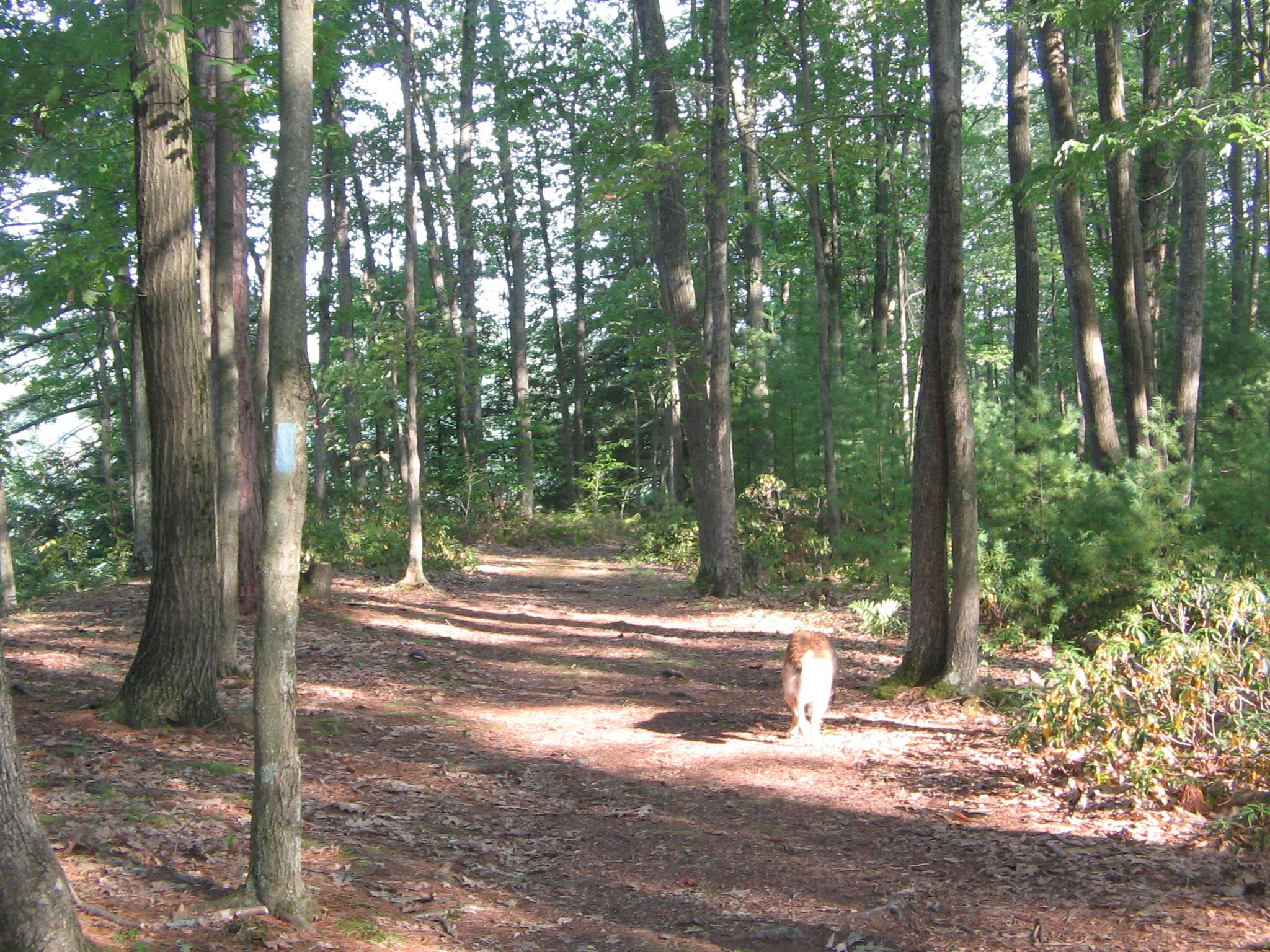
The Rim Trail follows the western edge of the Pine Creek Gorge through the park, linking overlooks and picnic shelters.

Colton Point State Park has some challenging hikes in and around the Grand Canyon of Pennsylvania, with 4.0 miles (6.4 km) of trails that feature very rugged terrain, pass close to steep cliffs, and can be very slick in some areas. Governor Robert P. Casey took a hiking tour of the park in July 1990, and in 2003 the DCNR reported that 18,239 people used the trails in the park.

- Rim Trail (yellow trail markers) is a relatively flat 1-mile (1.6 km) loop trail, which follows the perimeter of Colton Point and links all of the canyon viewing areas.
- Turkey Path (blue trail markers) is a difficult trail, 3 miles (5 km) long (down and back within the park), that follows Four Mile Run down the side of the canyon, descending over 800 feet (240 m) to Pine Creek and the rail trail at the bottom of the gorge. It was originally a mule drag used to haul timber to the creek. There is a 70-foot-tall (21 m) cascading waterfall about 0.5 miles (0.80 km) down the trail. The park website classifies it as a "down and back trail" since there is no bridge across Pine Creek. The Turkey Path continues in Leonard Harrison State Park, going from a point on Pine Creek just downstream of the end of the trail in Colton Point up to the Leoanrd Harrison overlook on the east rim of the gorge. According to Owlett, the creek can be forded with care when the water is low, and the Turkey Path connects the two parks.
- Pine Creek Rail Trail is a 62-mile-long (100 km) rail trail from Wellsboro Junction, just north of Wellsboro, south through the Pine Creek Gorge to Jersey Shore: 1 mile (1.6 km) of this trail is in Colton Point and Leonard Harrison State Parks. A 2001 article in USA Today said the scenic beauty of the Grand Canyon of Pennsylvania made the trail one of "10 great places to take a bike tour" in the world.
- West Rim Trail is a 30.5-mile-long (49.1 km) hiking trail that runs along the west rim of the Pine Creek Gorge from near the village of Ansonia in the north to Rattlesnake Rock near the village of Blackwell in the south. It is mostly on Tioga State Forest land, but passes through the extreme north of the park and then forms the western border of the park in the south. When the West Rim Trail opened in 1982, it was 21 miles (34 km) long and ended just south of the park, but it was extended 9 miles (14 km) north in 1985, passing through Colton Point. It was chosen by Outside Magazine as its "Best Hike in Pennsylvania" in April 1996.

=== Camping and picnics ===
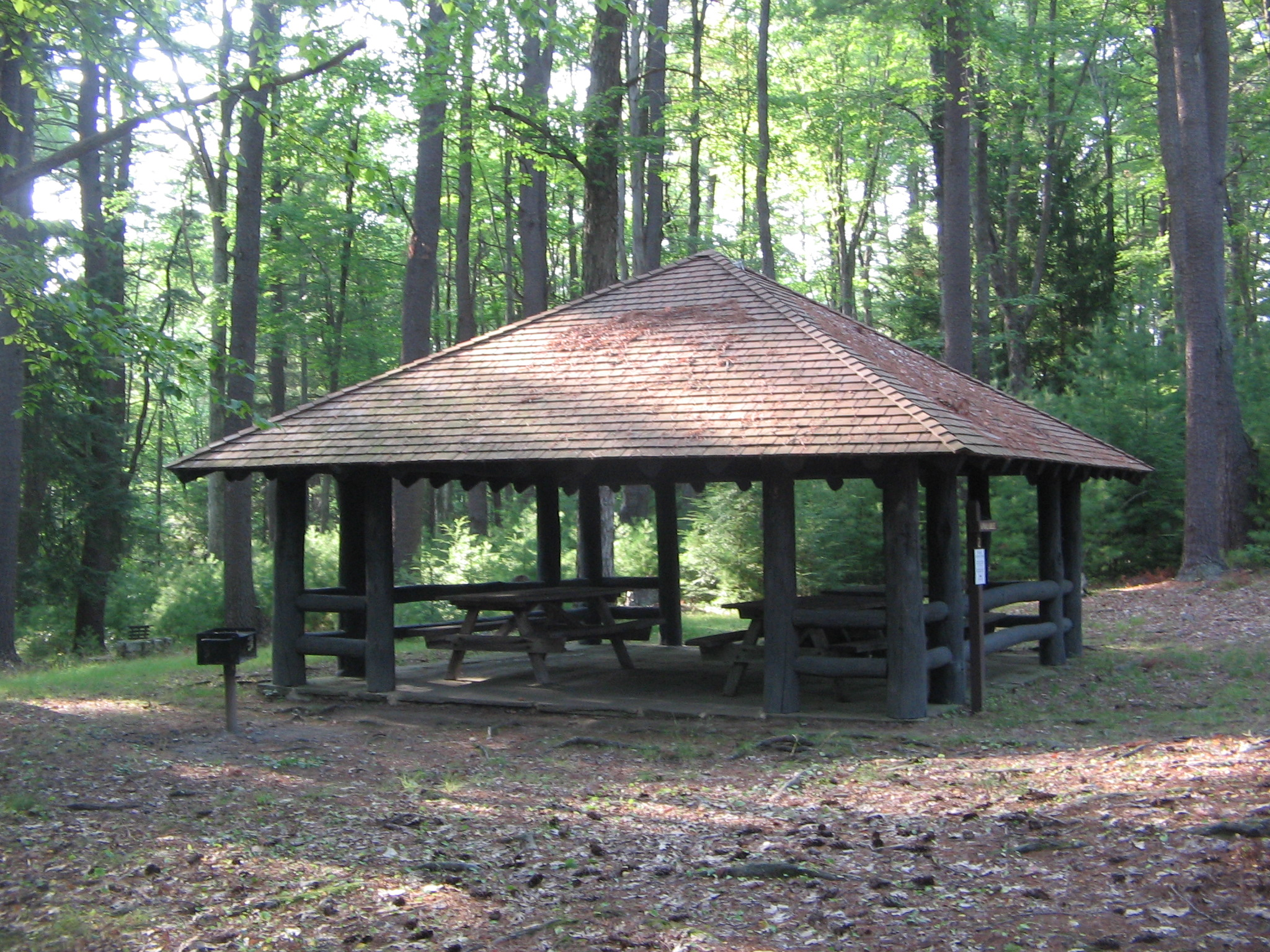
Picnic shelter 2 was built by the CCC and is one of five at the park listed on the NRHP.

Camping is a popular pastime at Colton Point State Park; 1,989 persons have used the camping facilities in 2003. With no modern amenities like flush toilets or showers, the campsites take on a rustic nature. There are outhouses, fire rings, a sanitary dump station and picnic tables at the campground. An Organized Group Tenting area, intended for organized youth or adult groups, can accommodate up to 90 campers. 1,490 campers used the area in 2003. The park also has approximately 100 picnic tables and five CCC-built picnic shelters which can be reserved. These facilities were used by 15,379 picnickers in 2003.

=== Hunting, fishing, and whitewater ===
Hunting is permitted in 100 acres (40 ha) of Colton Point State Park, and is regulated by the Pennsylvania Game Commission. The common game species are ruffed grouse, eastern gray squirrels, wild turkey, white-tailed deer, and black bears. The hunting of groundhogs is prohibited. More acres of forested woodlands are available for hunting on the grounds of the adjacent Tioga State Forest.

Fishing is permitted at Colton Point State Park. Anglers must descend the Turkey Path to reach Pine Creek. The species of fish found in Pine Creek are trout, smallmouth bass, and some panfish. There are several small trout streams that are accessible from within the park. Historically, the stretch of Pine Creek in the park has been fished by notable anglers, including President Theodore Roosevelt and Pennsylvania Governor William A. Stone.

Edward Gertler writes in Keystone Canoeing that Pine Creek "is possibly Pennsylvania's most famous canoe stream" and attributes this partly to the thousands who decide to boat on it after they "peer into Pine Creek's spectacular abyss from the overlooks of Leonard Harrison and Colton Point state parks". The park contains 1 mile (1.6 km) of Pine Creek, which is classified as Class 1 to Class 2 whitewater. Boaters do not normally start or end their run in the park: it is part of the 16.8-mile (27.0 km) trip from Ansonia (Marsh Creek) south to Blackwell (Babb Creek).

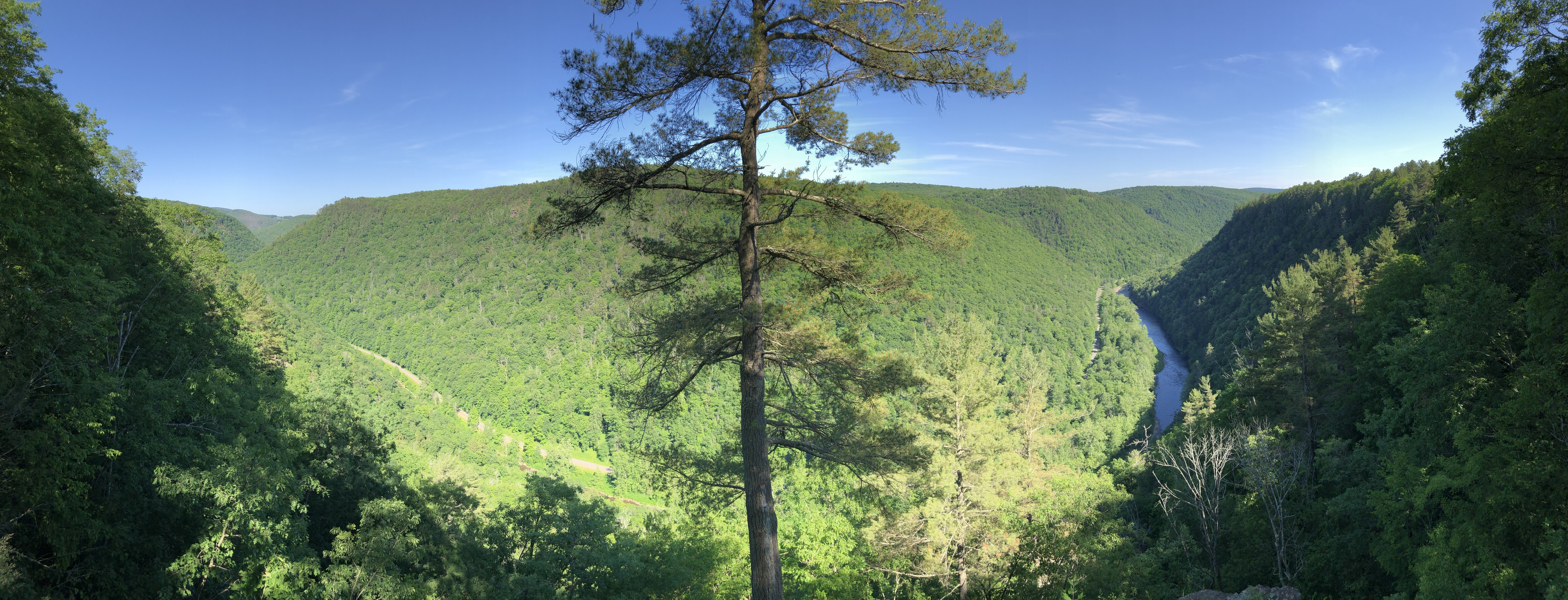
Panoramic view of the Pine Creek Gorge with the Pine Creek Rail Trail, Pine Creek and Leonard Harrison State Park, looking north (left), east (center), and south (right) from the second of the five overlooks in Colton Point State Park

== Notes ==
a. The earliest written record of contact with the Susquehannocks comes from Captain John Smith of Jamestown, who met members of the tribe near the mouth of the Susquehanna River on Chesapeake Bay in 1608. The tribe controlled the Susquehanna drainage basin and are believed to have lived there for at least a few centuries prior to this contact.
b. A spar sold for one dollar and three spars up to 90 feet (27 m) long were lashed together to make a ship's mast. The largest spar produced on Pine Creek was 43 inches (110 cm) in diameter 12 feet (3.7 m) above the base, 93 feet (28 m) long, and 33 inches (84 cm) in diameter at the top. By 1840, Tioga County alone produced over 452 such spar rafts with more than 22,000,000 board feet (50,000 m^{3}) of lumber.
c. United States Census records show that Henry Colton was born about 1819 in Massachusetts and was a lumberman who lived in Williamsport, Pennsylvania in 1860, 1870, and 1880. Colton's wife Elizabeth was born about 1830 in Maine, and their sons Henry Mead and George were born in Pennsylvania about 1863 and 1868, respectively. Colton owned real estate valued at $7,800 and personal property valued at $3,000 in 1860. By 1870, his real estate was valued at $37,000 and his personal property at $64,000. In 1880 he lived at 318 West Fourth Street in Williamsport. West Fourth Street was known as "Millionaires' Row" for the many opulent mansions of lumber barons and other wealthy residents found there. He may have served in the American Civil War as a private. Colton died in Williamsport on August 9, 1880 at the age of 59.
d. Early accounts of "salmon" in Pine Creek may have been referring to shad.
