= West Rim Trail =

Hiking trail in Lycoming County, Pennsylvania, United States

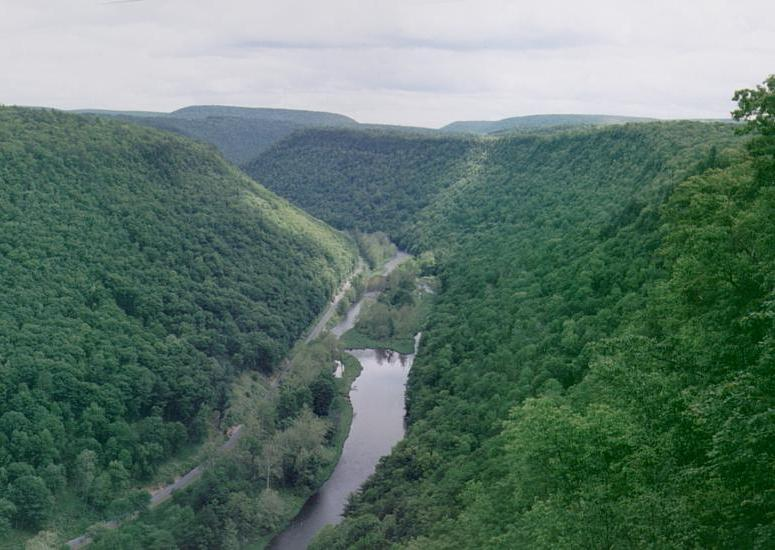
- Pine Creek Gorge looking south from a West Rim Trail vista
- Length: 30.5 mi (49.1 km)
- Location: Lycoming and Tioga Counties, Pennsylvania, United States
- Trailheads: North: Colton Road, 0.5 mile south of U.S. Route 6, near Ansonia; South: Pennsylvania Route 414, 1.8 miles south of Blackwell
- Use: Hiking
- Elevation change: Moderate
- Highest point: 2,080 feet (630 m)
- Lowest point: 850 feet (260 m)
- Difficulty: Moderate
- Season: Year-round
- Hazards: Uneven and wet terrain, rattlesnakes, mosquitoes, ticks, black bears

The West Rim Trail is a 30.5 mi (49.1 km) linear hiking trail in Lycoming and Tioga Counties in north central Pennsylvania. The trail mostly follows the edge of Pine Creek Gorge, also known as the Grand Canyon of Pennsylvania, which is up to 1,000 feet (300 m) deep and about 2,000 feet (610 m) wide from rim to rim in the area traversed by the trail. The trail is entirely within Tioga State Forest and is known for its large number of vistas overlooking the gorge, which is a National Natural Landmark and one of the deepest gorges in the eastern United States.

The West Rim Trail follows several old logging railroad grades, which remain from the late 1800s when Pine Creek Gorge and its surrounding plateau areas were almost completely clear-cut. The trail also visits several significant side gorges and small waterfalls that were formed by differential erosion as glaciers melted at the end of the last ice age, plus occasional stretches on top of the Allegheny Plateau, which itself was cut by Pine Creek Gorge. The West Rim Trail was chosen by Outside magazine as its "Best Hike in Pennsylvania" in 1996.

== Route ==
This section describes the West Rim Trail in the southbound direction. The trail begins at a forestry maintenance parking lot on Colton Road, south of U.S. Route 6 and near the village of Ansonia. The trail starts at a low elevation but soon begins a long diagonal "slab" climb up the side of Pine Creek Gorge, reaching the edge of the Allegheny Plateau and the first of several vistas over the gorge at 2.6 miles. Leonard Harrison State Park is visible on the other side of the gorge. At 4.0 miles, the trail briefly crosses a corner of Colton Point State Park. The trail then heads away from the gorge for about the next five miles, going around a significant side canyon formed by three different branches of Four Mile Run.

At 9.0 miles, the West Rim Trail returns to the edge of Pine Creek Gorge, with several more vistas across to Leonard Harrison State Park. Continuing southbound. the trail mostly follows the edge of the gorge for the next seven miles, but with several sojourns into rugged side gorges formed by a variety of small tributary streams, several of which feature small waterfalls. The trail passes through Bradley Wales Picnic Area at 15.9 miles, then leads inland for another extensive segment away from the gorge, this time to avoid a parcel of private land.

At 19.7 miles, the trail returns to the edge of the main gorge and for about the next eight miles repeats its previous pattern of following the edge of the gorge, with numerous vistas, interrupted by several trips into side hollows with occasional waterfalls. At 26.5 miles, the West Rim Trail passes a junction with the Bohen Run Trail; that trail follows the stream of the same name past a significant waterfall, reaches Pine Creek at the village of Blackwell, and eventually connects with the Mid State Trail.

After the junction with the Bohen Run Trail, the West Rim Trail turns away from Pine Creek Gorge again and heads inland for about one mile of plateau-top walking. At 28.2 miles the trail passes an old dynamite shed, and, at 28.8 miles, begins a significant descent, following Lloyd Run toward the bottom of Pine Creek Gorge. At 30.5 miles the trail ends at PA Route 414, south of Blackwell and across from a parking lot that serves the Pine Creek Rail Trail.
