= Hills Creek State Park =

State park in Pennsylvania, United States

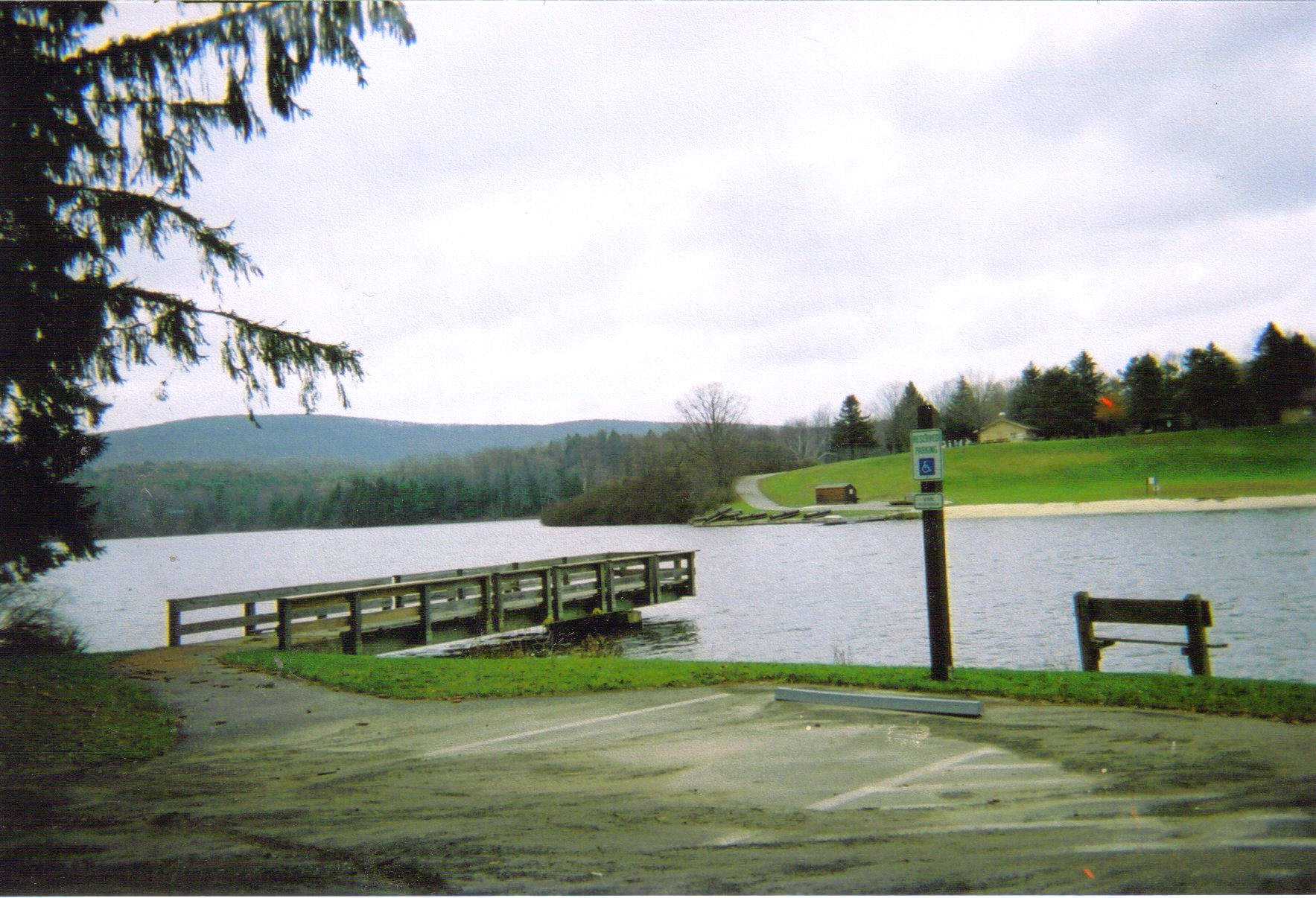

- Location within Pennsylvania Location within the United States
- Interactive map of Hills Creek State Park
- Location: Charleston Township, Tioga County, Pennsylvania, United States
- Coordinates: 41°48′15″N 77°11′27″W
- Area: 407 acres (165 ha)
- Elevation: 1,614 feet (492 m)
- Established: 1953
- Administrator: Pennsylvania Department of Conservation and Natural Resources
- Website: Official website
- Pennsylvania State Parks

Hills Creek State Park is a 407-acre (165 ha) Pennsylvania state park in Charleston Township, Tioga County, Pennsylvania in the United States. Hills Creek Lake, a 137-acre (55 ha) man-made lake, is the focal point of the park. It is open for year-round recreation. Hills Creek State Park is in the Allegheny Plateau region of Pennsylvania, just north of U.S. Route 6 near the boroughs of Wellsboro and Mansfield.

== History ==
Hills Creek State Park was opened for public use in 1953. The land had previously been used as a pigment mine for the paint industry. The park is named for Hills Creek which runs through it and is dammed to make Hills Creek Lake. Hills Creek gets its name from Captain William Hill, one of the first settlers in the area around 1820. In 2000 the park became part of the "Hills Creek State Park Complex", an administrative grouping of eight state parks in Potter and Tioga counties.

== Hills Creek Lake ==
Hills Creek Lake is a 137-acre (55 ha) impoundment lake. An earthen dam was built by the Commonwealth of Pennsylvania across Hills Creek in the early 1950s. The dam is 34 feet (10 m) high, and 422 feet (129 m) long.

Before the dam was built much of the area that is now under water was flooded by beaver dams. Beavers are still abundant in Hills Creek State Park.

Hills Creek Lake is classified as a warm water fishery. The waters are the home to many species of fish, including walleye, yellow perch, largemouth and smallmouth bass, bluegill, crappie, and muskellunge. Anglers have reeled in some largemouth bass that weighed in at over eight pounds.

Ice fishing takes place on Hills Creek Lake during the winter months. Ice fishermen have brought in mostly yellow perch and bluegill as well as the occasional walleye.

Swim at your own risk in Hills Creek Lake. A sandy beach is open from around Memorial Day until just after Labor Day. A bathhouse and snack bar are also open for the public during the summer months. There are no lifeguards at the beach and swimmers are encouraged to use safe practices at all times.

Gas powered motors are prohibited on Hills Creek Lake. Motorized boats must be powered by electric motors only. Sailboats, rowboats, canoes, kayaks, and paddleboats are permitted on the waters of the lake. All boats must be properly registered with the state.

== Camping ==
Hills Creek State Park has a 102-site camping area. The campsites feature several different types of scenery, ranging from open grassy areas to forested areas highlighted by immense hemlock trees. All of the campsites are within walking distance of warm showers, restrooms and water fountains.

Three cottages are available to rent by interested parties. The cottages can sleep up to five people in single and double bunks. The cottages have wooden floors, a porch that is heated by electricity, glass windows, picnic tables, and a fire ring. All cottages have electric lights and outlets.

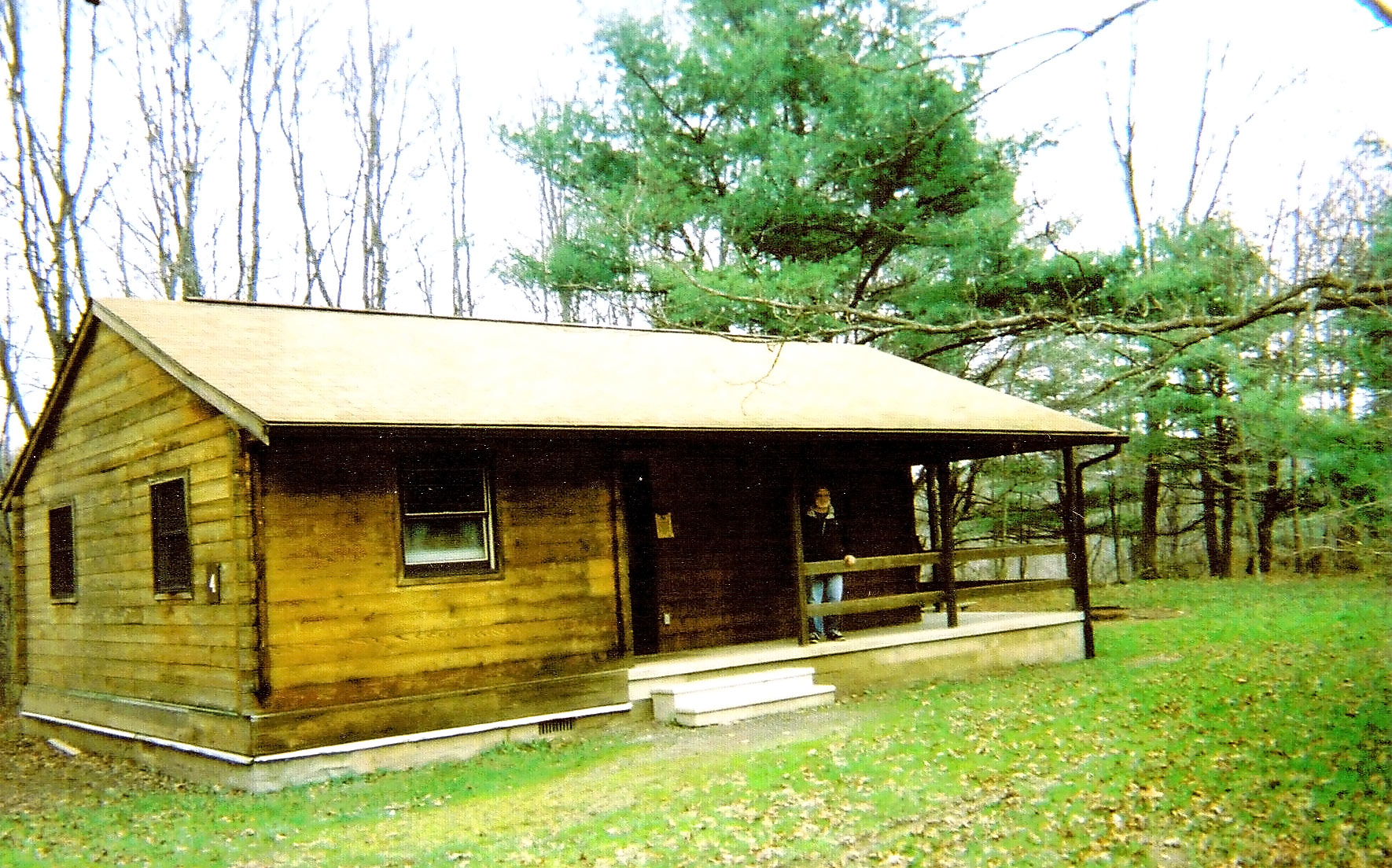
One of the ten cabins available to rent at Hills Creek State Park.

There are ten cabins at Hills Creek State Park. The cabins are furnished and have a kitchen/dining area. The cabins also have a shower and two bedrooms. There are no linens or kitchen utensils. Renters should bring their own.

Yurts are available for rent. Each yurt, built on a wooden deck, sleeps four people in two bunk beds. They also have a cooking stove, refrigerator, countertop, table and chairs, electric heat and outlets, a fire ring and picnic table and are near a water pump.

A campsite for large groups is on a peninsula in Hills Creek Lake. The 40 person capacity area is equipped with picnic tables, a pavilion, fire ring, water and flush toilets. Campers may use the showers near the RV campsite. This campground, on the peninsula, is among some of the largest hemlock, beech, maple and ash trees in the park.

== Wildlife ==
Hills Creek State Park is home to a variety of wild creatures. There is an active beaver colony near the shores of the lake. Other water loving animals such as the muskrat, wood duck and great blue heron can be seen in and around the waters of Hills Creek Lake. Birds of prey like the osprey and bald eagle can be seen soaring the skies to Hills Creek State Park. Woodland creatures also make a home in this park. Black bear, wild turkey and white-tailed deer can be seen on occasion. Ruffed grouse, rabbits, and groundhogs are commonly seen. The sharp eyed bird watcher may even spy a pileated woodpecker. Hills Creek Lake is a stop over for migrating waterfowl like the loon, bufflehead and merganser.
