= List of long-distance trails in the United States =

List of multi-use recreational trails in the United States

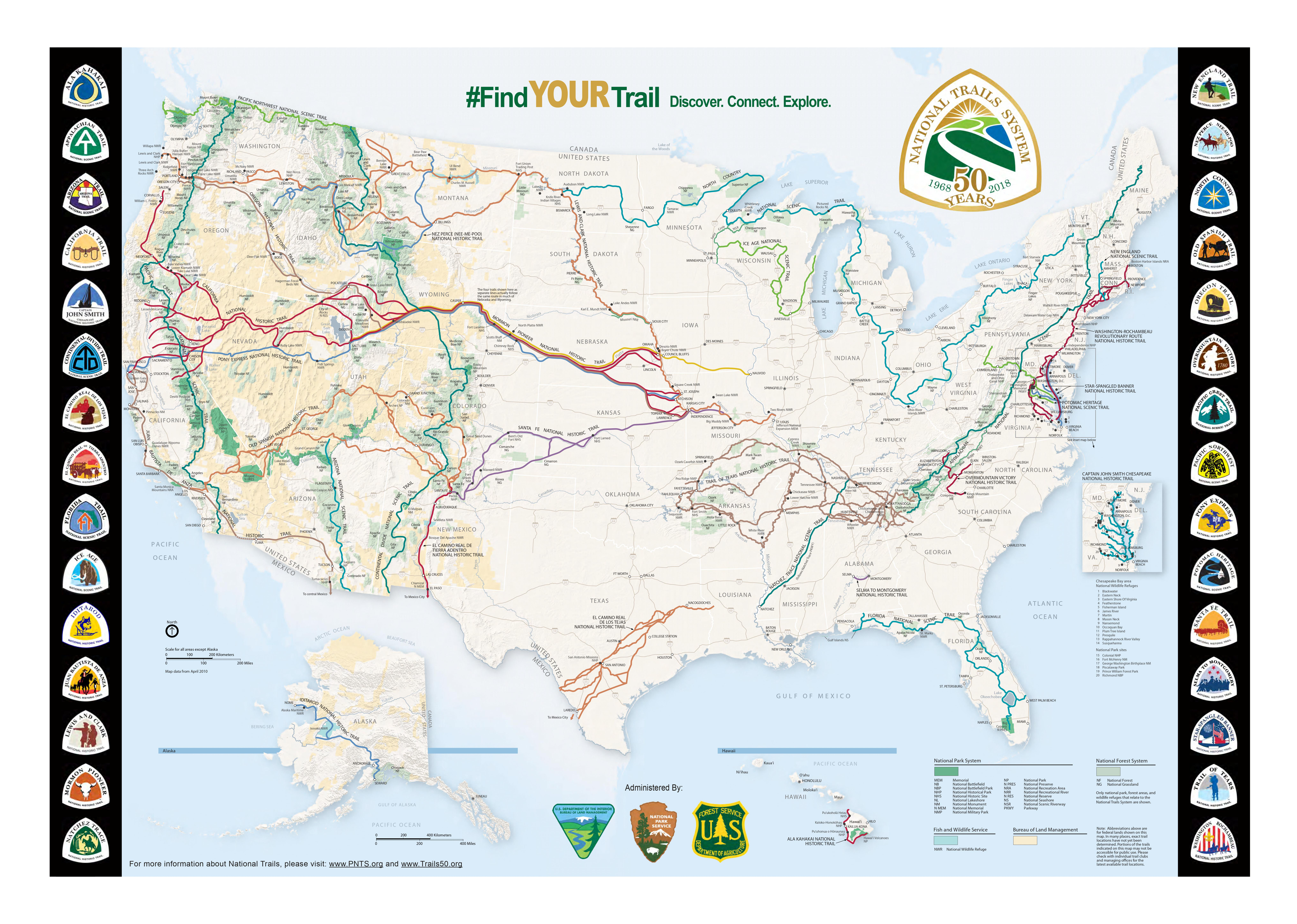
The National Trails System includes 11 long-distance National Scenic Trails with distinctive trail markers for each

This is a list of notable long-distance trails in the United States, with a minimum length of 30 miles (48 km).

Name	Length		Region	Endpoint 1	Endpoint 2	Description
Name	mi	km	Region	Endpoint 1	Endpoint 2	Description
Allegheny Trail	287.8	463	West Virginia	Appalachian Trail at Peters Mountain	Mason–Dixon line	Linear path traveling through the Appalachian and Allegheny Mountains.
Allegheny Front Trail	41.8	67	Pennsylvania			Loop trail in Moshannon State Forest.
American Discovery Trail	6,800	10,944	Coast-to-Coast	Cape Henlopen State Park, Delaware	Point Reyes National Seashore, California	Passes through Delaware, Maryland, West Virginia, Ohio, Kentucky (Southern Route), Indiana, Illinois, Iowa (Northern Route), Nebraska (Northern Route), Missouri (Southern Route), Kansas (Southern Route), Colorado, Utah, Nevada, and California. The northern route is 4,834 miles and the southern 5,057.
Appalachian Trail	2,198	3,537	Appalachian Mountains	Springer Mountain in Georgia	Mount Katahdin in Baxter State Park, Maine	National Scenic Trail running through Georgia, North Carolina, Tennessee, Virginia, West Virginia, Maryland, Pennsylvania, New Jersey, New York, Connecticut, Massachusetts, Vermont, New Hampshire, and Maine.
Arizona Trail	825.2	1,328	Arizona	Coronado National Memorial in Hereford, Arizona (at the United States–Mexico border)	Stateline Campground, Kanab, Utah	Designated a National Scenic Trail in 2009.
Art Loeb Trail	30.1	48	North Carolina	Davidson River Campground, Transylvania County, North Carolina	Daniel Boone Boy Scout Camp, Haywood County, North Carolina	Located in Pisgah National Forest; intersects Mountains-to-Sea Trail
Backbone Trail	68	109	Santa Monica Mountains NW of Los Angeles, California	Point Mugu State Park	Will Rogers State Historic Park	traverses Santa Monica Mountains, limited overnight capacity
Baker Trail	132	212	Pennsylvania			A linear trail, partially in Allegheny National Forest.
Bartram Trail	153	246	Southeast Appalachian Mountains	Chattooga River	Cheoah Bald	connects to the Appalachian and Foothills Trails; traverses Georgia and North Carolina
Batona Trail	49.5	80	New Jersey Pinelands National Reserve	Ong's Hat	Bass River State Forest	Passes through three state parks in the heart of the New Jersey Pine Barrens
Bay Area Ridge Trail	390	628	San Francisco Bay Area			circles San Francisco Bay; under development
Bay Circuit Trail & Greenway	230	370	Massachusetts	Newbury, Massachusetts	Kingston, Massachusetts	A 230-mile, close-to-home, multi-use trail traversing 37 towns from Plum Island to Duxbury/Kingston Bay.
Benton MacKaye Trail	287.6	463	Southern Appalachian Mountains	Springer Mountain in Georgia	Big Creek, north of Mount Sterling	connects from the southern terminus of the Appalachian Trail; traverses Georgia, Tennessee, and North Carolina. Both endpoints meet with the Appalachian Trail. Together, the two trails form a figure-8 loop.
Bigfoot Trail	356.5	574	California and southwest Oregon (~14 miles)	Yolla Bolly-Middle Eel Wilderness	Redwood National and State Parks near Crescent City, California	
Black Forest Trail	42.8	69	Pennsylvania			Loop trail in Tiadaghton State Forest.
Black Hills Centennial Trail	123	198	South Dakota	Wind Cave National Park	Bear Butte State Park	
Bonneville Shoreline Trail	173	278	Utah	Springville (current), Nephi (planned)	Hyde Park (current), Idaho border (planned)	follows the eastern shore of ancient Lake Bonneville between the Wasatch Front metropolitan area and the Wasatch Mountains. Currently in several disconnected segments of 2-25 miles.
Border Route Trail	65	105	Boundary Waters Canoe Area Wilderness			Follows the ridgeline above the chain of lakes along the international border between Minnesota and Ontario, Canada and is known for its dramatic vistas.
Buckeye Trail	1,444	2,324	Ohio	Lake Erie at Headlands Beach State Park	Eden Park in Cincinnati	circles Ohio; many scenic locations, such as the Hocking Hills region and the Cuyahoga Valley National Park; passes through many small historical towns, shares path with American Discovery Trail and North Country Trail
Bucktail Path	33.5	54	Pennsylvania			Linear trail in Elk State Forest.
California Coastal Trail	1,200	1,931	California	Oregon	Mexico	more than half complete as of June 2012; within sight, sound, or at least the scent of the sea
Catamount Trail	300	483	Vermont	Readsboro, Vermont	Canada–US border in North Troy, Vermont	A cross-country skiing trail which crosses the state of Vermont. Parts of the trail are only open in the winter.
Chuck Keiper Trail	50.6	81	Pennsylvania			Loop trail with cross-connector in Sproul State Forest.
Chief Ladiga Trail	33	53	Alabama	Georgia state line	Weaver	Alabama's longest rails-to-trails project, at the state line it turns into Georgia's Silver Comet Trail
Chilkoot Trail	33	53	Yukon	Dyea, Alaska	Bennett, British Columbia	international historical trail; late 1890s major access route between the coast and Yukon goldfields
C&O Canal Trail	184.5	297	Maryland	Cumberland	Washington, DC	trail is the old towpath for the abandoned Chesapeake and Ohio Canal along the Potomac River
Cohos Trail	162	261	Northern New Hampshire	Notchland, near Crawford Notch State Park	Canada–US border at the southern edge of Quebec	
Colorado Trail	483	777	Central Colorado	Waterton Canyon southwest of Denver	Durango	completed in 1987; highest point 13,334 ft (4,064 m); most above 10,000 ft (3,000 m); often dips below the alpine timberline
Conestoga Trail System	65.8	106	Pennsylvania	Horse-Shoe Trail	Mason-Dixon Trail	A linear trail that traverses Lancaster County, Pennsylvania.
Continental Divide Trail	3,100	4,989	Rocky Mountains	Glacier National Park, Montana at the U.S.–Canada border	Big Hatchet Mountains, New Mexico at the U.S.–Mexico border	on or near the Continental Divide; 70% complete as of 2007; crosses Triple Divide Peak
Corvallis to the Sea Trail	62	100	Oregon	Corvallis, Oregon	Ona Beach	eastern half opened September 2017; full trail opened August 2021
Cowboy Trail	195	314	Northern Nebraska	Norfolk, Nebraska	Valentine, Nebraska	started in 1996, a multi-use rail trail. 321 miles (517 km) of former rail right-of-way, if completed may create the longest rail trail.
Cranberry Lake 50	50	80	New York			circles the shores of Cranberry Lake in the Northwestern region of the Adirondack Park
Cumberland Trail	175	282	Tennessee			trail along the Cumberland Plateau
Des Plaines River Trail	55	89	Northern Illinois	Wisconsin state line	North Avenue in Melrose Park, Chicago	short stretches incomplete
Desert Trail	1586	2552	Western US deserts	Mexican border at Jacumba Hot Springs, California	Highway 78 in central Oregon	Not a constructed trail, a cross-country route through remote desert wilderness areas from Mexico to central Oregon; an extension continues to the Canadian border.
Donut Hole Trail	94.2	152	Pennsylvania			Linear trail in Sproul State Forest.
Duncan Ridge Trail	35.5	57	Chattahoochee National Forest	Appalachian & Benton MacKaye Trails at Three Forks	Appalachian Trail at Slaughter Mountain	A National Recreation Trail which forms a 60-mile (97 km) loop in combination with the Appalachian Trail.
East Coast Greenway	3,000	4,828	Eastern U.S.	Calais, Maine	Key West, Florida	65% complete or in advanced development as of 2024, multi-use path
Eastern Continental Trail	5,400	8,690	Eastern U.S.	Key West, Florida	Belle Isle, Newfoundland	mountain route to Labrador, Canada
Empire State Trail	750	1,207	New York	New York City	Buffalo, New York	Product of a 2017 statewide project to combine its various long-distance trails, resulting in a mostly-uninterrupted path running from New York to Buffalo via the capital Albany. New York State also counts US Route 9 as part of the trail, as bicyclists may share the highway from Albany all the way up to US-Canada border crossing at Rouses Point, New York.
Finger Lakes Trail	557.7	898	New York	Catskills	Western New York	Footpath: Main Trail from Allegany State Park to Catskills plus additional six branch trails. Traverses NYS along southern counties. Est. 1962
Florida Keys Overseas Heritage Trail	106	171	Florida	Key Largo	Key West	A paved rail-trail
Florida Trail	1,500	2,414	Florida	Gulf Islands National Seashore	Big Cypress National Preserve	Designated a National Scenic Trail in 1983; length includes separate eastern and western corridor options for two segments of trail
Fonta Flora State Trail	100	161	North Carolina	Asheville	Morganton	Developing hiking and cycling loop trail around Lake James with spurs to Asheville and Morganton.
Foothills Trail	76	122	Appalachian foothills	Table Rock State Park	Oconee State Park	Follows the Blue Ridge Escarpment in South Carolina, and partly in North Carolina.
Fox River Trail (Illinois)	44	71	Northern Illinois	Algonquin, Illinois	Oswego, Illinois	
Gandy Dancer State Trail	98.1	158	Wisconsin and Minnesota	St. Croix Falls, Wisconsin	Superior, Wisconsin	hiking and biking path
George S. Mickelson Trail	108.8	175	South Dakota			within the Black Hills
Gerard Hiking Trail	36	58	Pennsylvania			Loop trail in Oil Creek State Park.
Gerry Connolly Cross County Trail	40.5	65	Fairfax County, Virginia	Potomac River, Great Falls, Virginia	Occoquan River, Lorton, Virginia	Multi-use trail traversing the entire length of Fairfax County, Virginia
Grand Enchantment Trail	730	1,175	Southwest desert	Phoenix, Arizona	Albuquerque, New Mexico	east-west mostly wilderness trail
Great Allegheny Passage	150	241	Pennsylvania, Maryland	Pittsburgh, Pennsylvania	Cumberland, Maryland	Multi-use rail-trail
Great Eastern Trail	1,600	2,575	Eastern U.S.	New York	Alabama	in development with portions open
Great Western Loop	6,875	11,064	Western United States	Grand Canyon	Grand Canyon	loop of the U.S. west combining the Pacific Crest Trail, Pacific Northwest Trail, Continental Divide Trail and other trails.
Great Western Trail	4,455	7,170	Western Rockies	Canada	Mexico	In development; passes through Arizona, Idaho, Montana, Utah, and Wyoming
Great Western Trail (Illinois)	92	148	Illinois, Iowa			mostly rails to trails conversion
Greenbrier River Trail	77.1	124	West Virginia	North Caldwell, West Virginia	Cass, West Virginia	
Greenstone Ridge Trail	40	64	Isle Royale National Park	Windigo Ranger Station	Rock Harbor, Michigan	Backbone trail of Isle Royale
Hayduke Trail	812	1,307	Utah and Arizona			route in Utah and Arizona, linking Zion, Grand Canyon, Bryce Canyon, Capitol Reef, Canyonlands, and Arches National Parks
Hernández–Capron Trail	200	322	Florida			Historic trail
High Line Canal	71	114	Colorado	Waterton Canyon, Douglas County, CO	Aurora, CO	Historic irrigation ditch converted to a recreational greenway traversing through the Denver Metro Area.
High Sierra Trail	61.5	99	California	Crescent Meadow in Sequoia National Park	Mount Whitney	
Highline National Recreation Trail	54.8	88	Arizona	Pine, Arizona	Close to where Arizona State Route 260 intersects Mogollon Rim	Historic trail established in the late 1800s to link various homesteads and ranches below the Mogollon Rim.
Horse-Shoe Trail	140	225	Pennsylvania	Valley Forge	Appalachian Trail near Harrisburg	Linear trail through southeastern Pennsylvania.
Ice Age Trail	1,200	1,931	Wisconsin	Potawatomi State Park	Interstate Park	generally follows end moraine of the last ice age
Idaho Centennial Trail	996	1,603	Idaho	near Murphy Hot Springs	Upper Priest Falls	Traverses large wilderness areas
Iditarod Trail	1,025	1,650	Alaskan wilderness	Seward	Nome	famous dog sledding race; route alternates each year
Illinois Prairie Path	61	98	Illinois	Wheaton		second of 27 new National Trails, consists of three radials
International Appalachian Trail	1,900	3,058	Northeastern North America	Mount Katahdin, Maine	Newfoundland	from the northern terminus of Appalachian Trail; proposals pending to extend to Europe and North Africa
Iron Horse Regional Trail	40	64	San Francisco Bay Area	Concord, California	Pleasanton, California	The completed Iron Horse Regional Trail will span the distance from Livermore to Suisun Bay in Contra Costa County, a distance of 55 miles, connecting two counties and 12 cities.
John Muir Trail	211	340	California Sierra Nevada	Yosemite Valley	Mount Whitney	
Katy Trail	240	386	Missouri			crosses the state
Kekekabic Trail	41	66	Superior National Forest, Minnesota	Snowbank Lake Rd near Ely, MN	Gunflint Trail near Grand Marais, MN	A rugged footpath that crosses through the heart of the Boundary Waters Canoe Area Wilderness.
Knobstone Trail	58	93	Southern Indiana			The Knobstone Trail (KT) is Indiana's longest footpath – a 60-mile backcountry-hiking trail passing through Clark State Forest, Elk Creek Public Fishing Area, and Jackson-Washington State Forest. These state resource properties contain more than 42,000 acres of rugged, forested land in Clark, Scott and Washington counties in southern Indiana. The trail extends from Deam Lake, just north of State Road 60 in Clark County, to Delaney Park, just east of S.R. 135 in Washington County. The initial 32-mile segment of the trail was opened in 1980.
Lake Okeechobee Scenic Trail	109	175	Florida			part of the Florida Trail
Laurel Highlands Hiking Trail	70	113	Pennsylvania			Linear trail in the Laurel Highlands area.
Little Miami Scenic Trail	74.9	121	Miami Valley in Ohio	Springfield, Ohio	Newtown, Ohio	Entirely paved trail along the Little Miami River; almost entirely off-road. Continues an additional 32 miles (51 km) north to Bellefontaine as the Simon Kenton Trail.
Lone Star Hiking Trail	96	154	Texas	A few miles East of Richards, Texas	A few miles Northwest of Cleveland, Texas	Traverses east/west through the Sam Houston National Forest north of Houston. A series of intersecting loop trails bring total potential mileage to 132. Heavily forested throughout, the trail skirts many developed areas, and contains a number of road walks (some several miles long) connecting sections of the trail. Trail is blazed, well signed, and regularly maintained along the entire length.
Long Path	347.4	559	New York + New Jersey	George Washington Bridge in Fort Lee, New Jersey	Altamont, New York (Albany)	
Long Trail	272	438	Vermont	Massachusetts	Canada	A footpath in the Wilderness begun in 1910 and completed in the 1930s. The Long Trail spans the length of Vermont, following the spine of the Green Mountains. Typical hiking time is 2 to 4 weeks.
Loyalsock Trail	59.2	95	Pennsylvania	Pennsylvania Route 87, 10 mi (16 km) north of Montoursville	Meade Road, 0.2 mi (0.3 km) from U.S. Route 220, just north of Laporte	Linear trail in Loyalsock State Forest.
Maah Daah Hey Trail	144	232	North Dakota	Theodore Roosevelt National Park		the longest continuous single track mountain biking trail in America
Mason-Dixon Trail	199	320	Pennsylvania, Maryland, Delaware	Appalachian Trail at Whiskey Springs, Pennsylvania	Brandywine Creek at Chadds Ford, Pennsylvania	
Massanutten Trail	71	114	George Washington National Forest			Large loop trail in Central Virginia; National Recreation Trail.
Mattabesett Trail	57	92	South-Central Connecticut			Connects with Metacomet Trail to the north.
Mesabi Trail	63	101	Minnesota	Grand Rapids, Minnesota	Ely, Minnesota	Multi-use trail.
Metacomet Trail	132	212	Connecticut	Rising Corner, Connecticut on the Massachusetts border	Berlin, Connecticut	Connects with the Mattabesett Trail to the south and the Metacomet-Monadnock Trail to the north.
Metacomet-Monadnock Trail	114	183	New Hampshire	Metacomet Trail on the Massachusetts-Connecticut state line	Mount Monadnock	Connects to the Metacomet Trail to the south and the Monadnock-Sunapee Greenway to the north.
Michigan Shore-to-Shore Trail	220	354	Michigan	Lake Michigan	Lake Huron	Open to hikers and horses
Midstate Trail (Massachusetts)	92	148	Massachusetts			Worcester County, central Massachusetts
Mid State Trail (Pennsylvania)	327	526	Pennsylvania	Maryland	New York	A north-south linear trail across Pennsylvania.
Monadnock-Sunapee Greenway	50	80	Southwest New Hampshire	Mount Monadnock	Mount Sunapee	
Mountains-to-Sea Trail	1,000	1,609	North Carolina	Kuwohi (formerly Clingmans Dome), Great Smoky Mountains	Jockey's Ridge, Outer Banks	about 720 miles (1,160 km) are off-road as of 2026; follows the Appalachian Trail for 3.4 miles (5.5 km)
Natchez Trace Trail	440	708	Southeastern U.S.	Tennessee	Mississippi	disjoint trail; 62 miles (100 km) complete; not planned to be connected
New England Trail	233	375	Connecticut and Massachusetts	Guilford, Connecticut	New Hampshire border	includes most of the Metacomet-Monadnock Trail, Mattabesett Trail and Metacomet Trail; designated as NST in 2009
New River Trail State Park	57	92	Southern Virginia	Pulaski, Virginia	Fries, Virginia & Galax, Virginia	A rail trail, with three end points, following the New River and one of its tributaries.
North Country Trail	4,800	7,725	Northern United States	Crown Point, New York	Lake Sakakawea State Park, North Dakota	A diverse footpath crossing the prairies of North Dakota; the Northwoods of Minnesota, Wisconsin, and Michigan; rural farm country of southern Michigan and western Ohio; the rugged Allegheny Plateau of eastern Ohio, Pennsylvania, and New York; the Finger Lakes region and Adirondacks of New York; and finally through the Green Mountains of Vermont where it connects with the Long Trail.
North-South Trail (RI)	77	124	Rhode Island	Blue Shutters Beach, Charlestown, Rhode Island	Massachusetts border, Burrillville, Rhode Island	A hiking trail that runs the length of Rhode Island from the Atlantic Ocean in Charlestown to the Massachusetts border in Burrillville, Rhode Island where it connects to the Mid-State Trail.
North Umpqua Trail	79	127	Oregon (Southern)	Swiftwater Park near Glide Oregon	Digit Point Trailhead near Chemult Oregon	follows the Umpqua River; 11 segments mostly in undeveloped forest, connects to Pacific Crest Trail on the eastern end.
Northville-Placid Trail	138.4	223	New York	Northville	Lake Placid	North-south low-elevation trail through the Adirondack Park (begin 1922, completed 1924).
OC&E Woods Line State Trail	105	169	Oregon	Klamath Falls	Thompson Reservoir	a rail trail and Oregon State Park
Ocean to Lake Trail	63	101	Florida	Hobe Sound Beach on the Atlantic Ocean	Lake Okeechobee	The Ocean to Lake Hiking Trail (OTLHT) runs approx 63 miles west from Hobe Sound Beach to Lake Okeechobee where it ends at the Lake Okeechobee Scenic Trail (LOST) trail head.
Ohio to Erie Trail	318	512	Ohio	Cincinnati on the Ohio River	Cleveland	Incorporates numerous rail trails and roads
Olympic Discovery Trail	120	193	Washington state's Olympic Peninsula	Port Townsend	La Push	about 40 miles (64 km) complete as of 2011 with the remainder traversable using public roads
Oregon Coast Trail	362	583	Oregon	North Oregon coast at South Jetty	Brookings	entire Pacific coast of Oregon
Oregon Desert Trail	750	1,207	Oregon	Oregon Badlands Wilderness	Lake Owyhee State Park	under development as of summer 2013, though no trail needs to be built: uses existing trails and public lands
Oregon Skyline Trail	428	689	Oregon	Washington state	California	established in 1920, incorporated into Pacific Crest Trail in 1968; follows Cascades backbone
Ouachita National Recreation Trail	223	359	Arkansas and Oklahoma			longest trail in Ouachita National Forest
Overmountain Victory National Historic Trail	214	344	Southeastern United States	Abingdon, Virginia & Elkin, North Carolina	Kings Mountain National Military Park	Y-shaped trail commemorating the historic route of the Overmountain Men.
Ozark Highlands Trail	218	351	Arkansas			through the Ozark National Forest
Ozark Trail	350	563	Missouri			
Pacific Crest Trail	2,654	4,271	West Coast	Mexico	Canada	traverses Sierra Nevada and the Cascade Range paralleling the Pacific Ocean in California, Oregon and Washington
Pacific Northwest Trail	1,200	1,931	Pacific Northwest	Chief Mountain Border Station, Glacier National Park, Montana	Cape Alava, Olympic National Park, Washington	Designated a National Scenic Trail in 2009.
Palmetto Trail	425	684	South Carolina	Charleston	Southern Appalachians	225 contiguous miles 362 km complete
Paumanok Path	125	201	Long Island, New York	Rocky Point	Montauk Point	Only long-distance trail in the Long Island Central Pine Barrens
Pinhoti Trail	335	539	Alabama and Georgia	Benton MacKaye Trail	Flagg Mountain near Weogulfa, Alabama	Connects the Appalachian Trail to the southernmost mountain of the Appalachian Mountain chain that is over 1,000 feet (300 m) in elevation.
Potomac Heritage Trail	710	1,143	District of Columbia, Virginia, Maryland, Pennsylvania			Incomplete; trail network within Potomac River basin.
Quehanna Trail	73.2	118	Pennsylvania			Loop trail in Moshannon State Forest and Elk State Forest.
Rachel Carson Trail	45.7	74	Pennsylvania	Harrison Hills Park	North Park (Pittsburgh)	Linear trail with several views of the Allegheny River.
Razorback Regional Greenway	37.6	61	Arkansas			
River to River Trail	162	261	Southern Illinois	Ohio River	Mississippi River	Stretches through Shawnee National Forest. It forms part of the Southern Section of the American Discovery Trail.
Robert Frost Trail	47	76	Massachusetts			Connecticut River Valley
Rock Island Trail (Missouri)	47	76	Western Missouri	Pleasant Hill, Missouri	Windsor, Missouri	
San Francisco Bay Trail	500	805	San Francisco Bay Area			encircles shoreline of San Francisco Bay; under development
Santa Fe to Taos Thru-Hike	132.5	213	northern New Mexico	Santa Fe Plaza	Taos Plaza	A high-country thru-hike over the Sangre de Cristo Mountains between two popular tourist destinations.
Sauratown Trail	33.1	53	North Carolina			
Sheltowee Trace Trail	333	536	Kentucky	Big South Fork National River and Recreation Area	Rowan County, Kentucky	Daniel Boone National Forest
Sierra High Route	195	314	California			within Kings Canyon National Park, Inyo National Forest, and Yosemite National Park
Silver Comet Trail	61.5	99	western Georgia	Smyrna, Georgia	Georgia/Alabama state line near Cedartown, Georgia	paved rails-to-trails project that connects to Alabama's Chief Ladiga Trail
Silver Moccasin Trail	53	85	Southern California		Angeles National Forest, California	Thru-hike from Chantry Flat near Arcadia to Vincent Gap near Wrightwood, California. The trail is common with the Pacific Crest Trail from Three Points to Vincent Gap and passes over Mount Baden-Powell.
Spokane River Centennial Trail	37	60	Washington	Sontag Park in Nine Mile Falls, Washington	Washington / Idaho state line	Paved trail along the Spokane River connects to the North Idaho Centennial Trail for further 23 miles.
Standing Stone Trail	80	129	Pennsylvania	Mid State Trail near McAlevys Fort, Pennsylvania	Tuscarora Trail in Buchanan State Forest	Connects the Mid State and Tuscarora Trails. Known as the Link Trail until 2007.
Superior Hiking Trail	310	499	Minnesota	Wisconsin border east of Jay Cooke State Park	270 Degree Overlook at the Canada–US border	follows north shore of Lake Superior
Susquehannock Trail System	83.4	134	Pennsylvania			Loop trail in Susquehannock State Forest.
Tahoe Rim Trail	165	266	California + Nevada			loop trail surrounding Lake Tahoe
Tahoe–Yosemite Trail	180	290	California	Tuolumne Meadows in Yosemite	Lake Tahoe	
Tecumseh Trail	38.2	61	Indiana	Morgan Monroe State Forest	Monroe Reservoir	
Theodore Solomons Trail	271	436	California	Glacier Point	Horseshoe Meadows	parallel alternate to the John Muir Trail, laying lower and further west
Timberline Trail	40.7	66	Oregon			loops around Mount Hood, almost completely in wilderness
Trail of the Coeur d'Alenes	73	117	Idaho	Mullan, Idaho	Plummer, Idaho	rail trail along abandoned Union Pacific right-of-way
Trans-Catalina Trail	38.5	62	California	Avalon	Two Harbors, California	Traverses the length of Santa Catalina Island
Tunnel Hill State Trail	48	77	Southern Illinois	Harrisburg, Illinois	Karnak, Illinois	
Tuscarora Trail	252	406	Pennsylvania, Maryland, Virginia, West Virginia			Parallels the Appalachian Trail to the west.
Uinta Highline Trail	104	167	Utah	Hayden Pass, Utah Route 150	McKee Draw, U.S. Route 191	Follows the mountain ridges including Utah's highest mountain, Kings Peak; traverses the High Uintas Wilderness.
Uwharrie Trail	40	64	Central North Carolina	Randolph County, North Carolina	Montgomery County, North Carolina	Original trail has been fragmented. Through hike requires a few miles of walking on country roads. Reconnection efforts are underway.
Virginia Capital Trail	51.7	83	Virginia	Jamestown, Virginia	Richmond, Virginia	
Virginia Creeper Trail	35	56	Southwest Virginia	Abingdon, Virginia	Whitetop, Virginia	near the Appalachian Trail; multi use rail trail
Wabash Cannonball Trail	63	101	Ohio	Montpelier	near Liberty, Ohio	rail to trail conversion in northwestern Ohio; partially complete in 2012; two forks meet in Maumee
Warrior Trail	67	108	Pennsylvania and West Virginia	Monongahela River at Greensboro, Pennsylvania	Ohio River south of Moundsville, West Virginia	A hiking trail entirely on private property
Washington & Old Dominion Railroad Trail	44.7	72	Northern Virginia	Shirlington, Virginia	Purcellville, Virginia	A rail trail in Northern Virginia.
Waterloo-Pinckney Trail	38	61	Michigan	Big Portage Lake	Silver Lake	Lower Peninsula and the closest city is Chelsea, Michigan
West Rim Trail	30.5	49	Pennsylvania	Colton Road near Ansonia, Pennsylvania	Pennsylvania Route 414 south of Blackwell, Pennsylvania	Linear trail that follows the western edge of Pine Creek Gorge.
Willard Munger State Trail	63	101	Northern Minnesota	Hinckley, Minnesota	Duluth, Minnesota	A rail trail in Minnesota
Iron Belle Trail	1,204	1,938	Michigan	Ironwood, Michigan	Belle Isle, Michigan	Using existing trails, networks and new connections, the Iron Belle Trail will extend 1,204 miles for hiking and 828 miles for biking (separate trails) from the far western tip of the Upper Peninsula to Belle Isle in Detroit, with a route of bicycling, and a route of hiking. The trail is approximately 70% completed.
Wonderland Trail	93	150	Washington			loop around Mount Rainier in Washington

== See also ==
- National Trails System
- National Millennium Trail project – 16 long-distance trails selected in 2000 as visionary trails that reflect defining aspects America's history and culture
- Triple Crown of Hiking - term for completing the three major trails (Pacific Crest, Appalachian, Continental Divide)
- List of long-distance footpaths
- State wildlife trails (United States)
- European long-distance paths
