= South Suburban Park and Recreation District =

Park district in Colorado, United States

Coordinates: 39.6095°N 105.0112°W

The South Suburban Park and Recreation District is a park and recreation district containing 41 square-miles on the southern edge of the Denver, Colorado metro area. Established in 1959, the park serves around 155,000 people in six communities and three counties: Bow Mar, Columbine Valley, Littleton, Sheridan, Centennial west of 1-25, Lone Tree west of 1-25, and unincorporated portions of Douglas County, Jefferson County and Arapahoe County.

There are over 100 parks in the district, including 61 playgrounds and athletic fields. The district includes several community recreation centers, swimming pools, ice arenas, almost 50 tennis courts and an indoor tennis center, a BMX track, a miniature golf course and batting cages. There are several public golf courses and a disc golf course. There are over 3,000 acres (12 km^{2}) of parkland and greenways and nearly 100 mi (160 km) of trails.

Carson Nature Center in Littleton is located in South Platte Park, which includes 880 acres of open space along the South Platte River and Mary Carter Greenway Trail. Fishing is allowed in the five lakes and visitors can kayak through gentle water or rapids in the river. There is a regional trail for biking and running, and miles of natural surface trails. The Carson Nature Center museum includes live animals, exhibits about riparian ecosystems and their inhabitants, the South Platte Flood of 1965 which resulted in the construction of the Chatfield Reservoir, and wildlife in the park.

The district manages and maintains the portion of the High Line Canal Trail within its borders.

== See also ==
- Hudson Gardens, a private botanical garden in Littleton
