= Conestoga Trail =

Long-distance hiking trail in the United States

Coordinates: 39.8142°N 76.3311°W

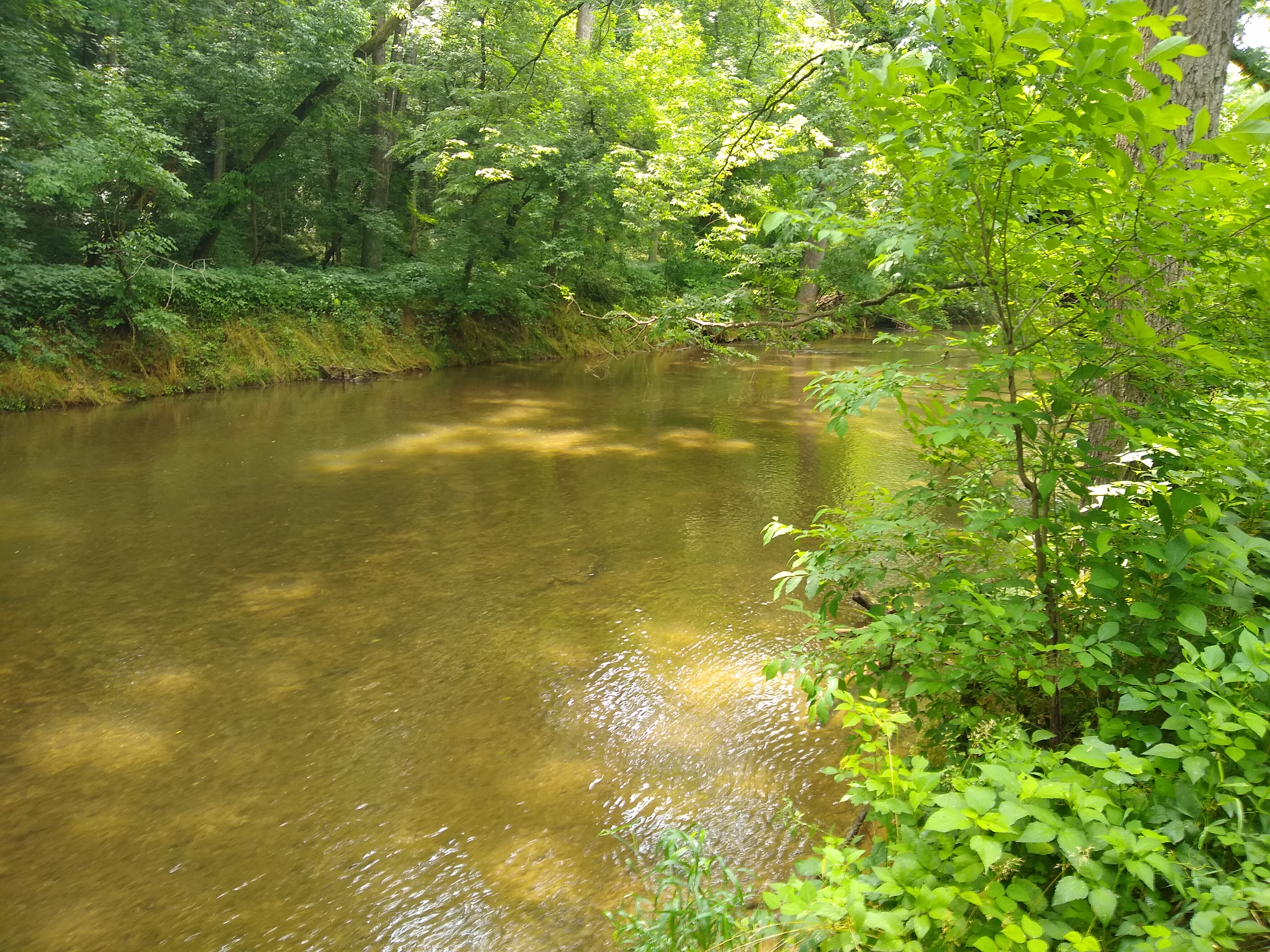
- Mill Creek as seen from the Conestoga Trail in Lancaster County Central Park
- Length: 65.8 mi (105.9 km)
- Location: Lancaster County, Pennsylvania, U.S.
- Trailheads: Susquehanna and Tidewater Canal Lock 12, Upper Hopewell Forge Wildlife Sanctuary
- Use: Hiking
- Elevation change: Low
- Difficulty: Low
- Season: Year-round
- Hazards: Road walking, mosquitoes, ticks

The Conestoga Trail is a 65.4-mile (105.3 km) linear hiking trail in Lancaster County, Pennsylvania. The trail connects several relatively short and discontinuous footpaths with walks on paved roads. About 53% of the network's distance is made up of road walking, and those segments are intended to showcase the rural scenery of Lancaster County, utilizing three covered bridges and passing numerous Amish and Mennonite farms, as well as some urban and suburban neighborhoods in and around Lancaster. The footpath segments offer wilderness scenery of the type that can be found in many of Pennsylvania's forested areas, plus some walks alongside farm fields.

Most of the off-road portions of the route are on private property, so except for several miles near the south end of the route, camping is prohibited along most of the Conestoga Trail. The trail route is maintained by Lancaster Hiking Club, which regularly searches for options to relocate the route off of roads and into private or public woods and fields, so the route and distance of the Conestoga Trail are known to change periodically.

== Route ==
=== South of Lancaster ===
This description illustrates the route of the Conestoga Trail from south to north. The trail begins at a junction with the Mason-Dixon Trail in southern Lancaster county, at a parking area for Susquehanna and Tidewater Canal Lock 12, near the west bank of the Susquehanna River. The trail walks past historical exhibits at the Lock 12 park, then joins Pennsylvania Route 372 and follows the lengthy Norman Wood Bridge over the river. The trail then turns north and follows the river's gorge, remaining off-road for most of the next 15 miles. The trail passes through Holtwood Environmental Preserve and reaches scenic Kellys Run Gorge at 4.3 miles. The trail returns to an escarpment above the Susquehanna and passes an overlook called The Pinnacle at 6.0 miles and a cave at 11.1 miles. This segment of the route features several scenic hollows cut by small streams that lead to the river below.

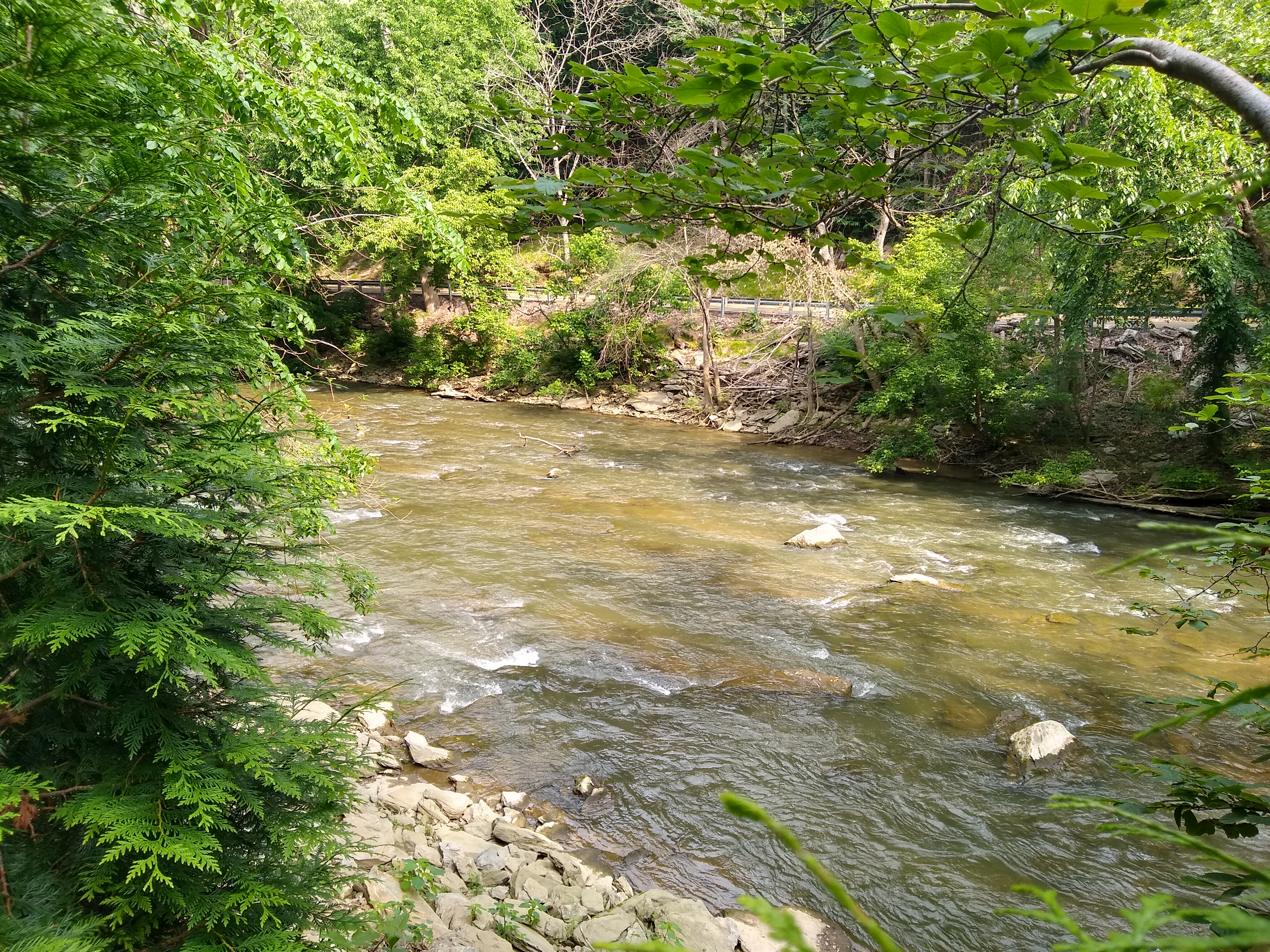
Pequea Creek, as seen from the southern segment of the Conestoga Trail.

The trail briefly walks through the village of Pequea starting at 12.0 miles, then follows Pequea Creek upstream by using a series of old driveways and railroad grades. Colemanville Covered Bridge is passed, but not traversed, at 14.5 miles. The trail crosses the creek via a bridge on Pennsylvania Route 324 at 15.8 miles, then continues alongside the creek and passes under a 100+ foot-high viaduct of the Atglen and Susquehanna Branch railroad, which was converted to a rail-trail called the Enola Low Grade Trail in 2022.

Starting at 16.1 miles, the Conestoga Trail follows roads for most of the next 15 miles. Starting at 20.2 miles, the hiker walks through the small town of Conestoga, followed by about seven-tenths of a mile in the woods to the northwest of Conestoga's cemetery. The trail then follows a lengthy series of rural roads again to the Lancaster metropolitan area, briefly following a multiplex of Pennsylvania routes 324 and 741 at 26.9 miles. After walking through the southern suburbs of Lancaster on residential streets, jogging briefly on US Route 222, and traversing a golf course, the Conestoga Trail spends about 2.5 miles on a variety of footpaths in Lancaster County Central Park, first alongside Mill Creek and then the Conestoga River. with the trail crossing its namesake river for the first time via a street bridge at the north end of the park. At 33.9 miles, the route joins the Conestoga Greenway Trail, a short rail trail on the east side of Lancaster, then follows residential streets to a brief walk through a commercial area along Pennsylvania Route 462 at 35.8 miles. A road bridge on that segment allows the hiker to cross the Conestoga River again.

=== North of Lancaster ===
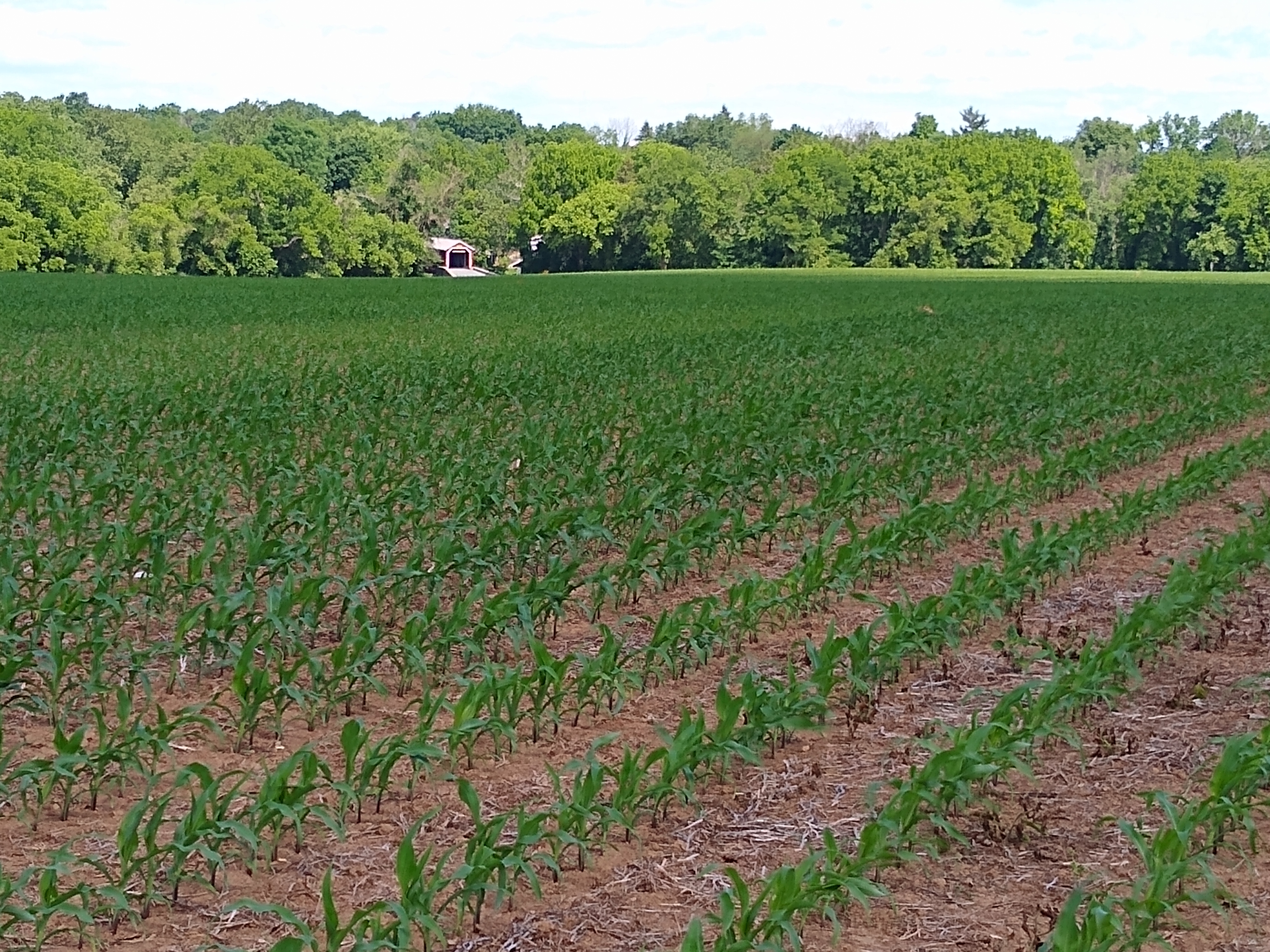
View of a farm field and covered bridge, from the Conestoga Trail north of Lancaster.

After leaving PA 462, the Conestoga Trail walks north through an industrial area with a brief jaunt on local footpaths to the Conestoga River and then back to the same road. The route is then on paved rural roads for about the next 15 miles, passing out of the Lancaster suburbs and entering an agricultural region with many historic farms as well as Amish and Mennonite communities. The trail uses Hunsecker's Mill Covered Bridge at 43.1 miles, and then Pinetown Bushong's Mill Covered Bridge at 45.20 miles; both of those lead over the Conestoga River. The trail uses an overpass above the US Route 222 freeway at 45.8 miles then briefly walks on Pennsylvania routes 272 and 722 before returning to paved farming roads. The hiker uses Zook's Mill Covered Bridge, this time over Cocalico Creek, at 49.0 miles.

Starting at 51.7 miles, the Conestoga Trail utilizes a segment of the Warwick-to-Ephrata Rail Trail for about 1.5 miles before returning once again to paved farming roads. Starting at 54.5 miles, the route traverses a series of private yards, commercial fields, and farm fields alongside Hammer Creek, followed by some more road walking, and then a return to Hammer Creek for more creekside hiking.

The route briefly joins Pennsylvania Route 501 at 60.3 miles then reaches the dam and artificial lake at Speedwell Forge at 61.0 miles. From here, most of the rest of the Conestoga Trail is on footpaths, including some walks alongside farm fields. At 64.9 miles, the trail climbs over the top of a culvert that carries Hammer Creek under the Pennsylvania Turnpike, with a walk alongside the highway for a short distance before descending to the other side of the creek. The trail reaches another paved road at 64.9 miles, then follows two more roads briefly until ending at 65.4 miles at a junction with the Horse-Shoe Trail. This trail junction is near US 322, along a side road that visits Upper Hopewell Forge Wildlife Sanctuary and a memorial to local pioneer Peter Grubb.
