= Hudson Gardens =

Botanical garden and event venue in Littleton, Colorado

Coordinates: 39.6046°N 105.0226°W

Hudson Gardens & Event Center
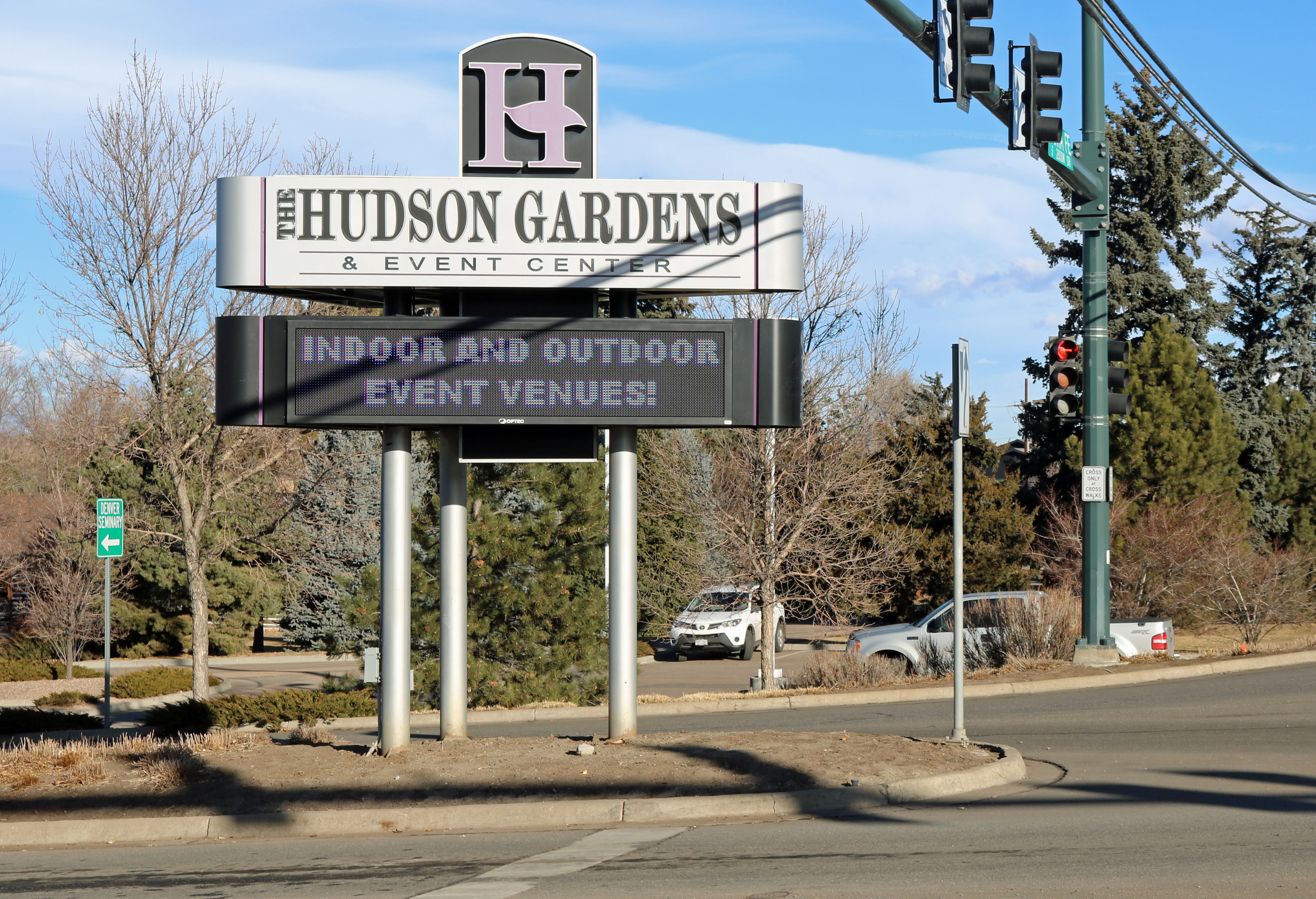
- Entrance to the venue (c.2017)
- Interactive map of Hudson Gardens & Event Center
- Former names: Hudson Gardens (1996-2002)
- Address: 6115 S Santa Fe Dr; Littleton, CO 80120-1818
- Location: Denver Metro
- Owner: South Suburban Park and Recreation District
- Operator: Hudson Foundation
- Capacity: 3,250 (Concert Amphitheater) Event venues: The Inn: 250; Garden Canopy: 225; Garden Pavilion: 175

Construction
- Opened: June 1996

Website
- www.hudsongardens.org

The Hudson Gardens & Event Center is a botanical garden and event venue located in Littleton, Colorado, 12 miles southwest of Denver. The property is composed of thirty acres of garden exhibits, trails, natural terrain, and event venues.

The gardens opened to the public in June 1996. In 1999, the venue began to hold its annual "Hudson Gardens Summer Concert Series". The concert series concluded in 2020.

== History ==
The Gardens began in 1941 as the private garden of Colonel King C. and Evelyn Leigh Hudson. While living on the property, which was originally just five acres of land, the couple owned and managed the Country Kitchen to great success. The Hudsons also took care of large gardens on their property and were particularly fond of traveling extensively, closing the Country Kitchen during the winter season. Evelyn created "The King C. Hudson & Evelyn Leigh Hudson Foundation, Inc." before her death in 1988. Hudson Gardens became open to the public in 1996.

Currently, a portion of Hudson Gardens is under construction due to Phase I of the River Integration Project, which is slated to be completed in June 2019. This project will open up access points from the property to the South Platte River Trail.

Hudson Gardens offers a summer concert series each year, as well as a holiday lights display, A Hudson Christmas.

== Gardens ==
They contain varied grounds ranging from high, dry prairie to river wetlands, and feature plants that thrive in the dry Colorado climate. The gardens include: Conifer Grove, Deciduous Woodland, Garden Canopy, Herb Garden, Iris Bed, Mary Carter Greenway, Ornamental Grass Garden, Oval Garden, Rock Garden Canyon, Rose Garden, Secret Garden, Shade Garden, Water Garden, Wetlands, Songbird Gardens, Vegetable Garden, Pumpkin Patch, and a Xeriscape Garden. Other garden features include a g-scale model railroad and honeybee apiary.

Hudson Gardens & Event Center offers 3 venues, including the Rose Garden, Monet's Place, and The Inn, for weddings, celebrations of life, and other ceremonies. Hudson Gardens also hosts corporate meetings, annual races, and more.

== Facilities ==
Gardens

- Oval Garden
- Rose Garden
- Honeybee Garden
- Herb and Vegetable Garden
- Water Gardens
- Songbird Garden
- Welcome Garden

Venues

- The Inn at Hudson Gardens
- The Garden Canopy
- Garden Pavilion
- Concert Amphitheater
- The Overlook

Attractions

- Victoria Water Lily Pond
- Garden Railroad
- Aquatic Plant Holding Pond
- Monet's Place
- The Island

== Performers ==
2014
- Nitty Gritty Dirt Band
- Paul Rodgers
- Kansas
- America
- Smokey Robinson
- Super Diamond
- Firefall
- Jefferson Starship
- Boz Scaggs
- Creedence Clearwater Revisited
- Chris Isaak
- Peter Frampton
- Little River Band
- Night Ranger
- Lynyrd Skynyrd
2015
- Creedence Clearwater Revisited
- Three Dog Night
- George Thorogood
- Brian Setzer
- .38 Special
- Joan Jett & the Blackhearts
- Firefall
- Super Diamond
- The Bangles
- The Temptations
- Lonestar
- Lynyrd Skynyrd
- REO Speedwagon
- Clint Black
- Bret Michaels
- Kenny Loggins
- Boyz II Men
- Chris Isaak
2016
- Blue Öyster Cult
- Jefferson Starship
- Little River Band
- Gladys Knight
- Lita Ford
- The Babys
- The Sweet
- Firefall
- Super Diamond
- The B-52's
- The Robert Cray Band
- Boz Scaggs
- Travis Tritt
- "Weird Al" Yankovic
- War
- Los Lonely Boys
- Gin Blossoms
- Michael McDonald
- Foreigner
- Kenny Loggins
2017
- The Four Tops
- Loverboy
- Survivor
- Kenny Wayne Shepherd
- Michael McDonald
- Firefall
- Super Diamond
- Donny & Marie
- Gladys Knight
- Chris Isaak
- Creedence Clearwater Revisited
- Lynyrd Skynyrd
- Los Lobos
- Los Lonely Boys
- Joan Jett & the Blackhearts
- Kool & the Gang
- The B-52's
- Yes Featuring Jon Anderson, Trevor Rabin, Rick Wakeman
2018
- Brian Setzer
- .38 Special
- The O'Jays
- Firefall
- Super Diamond
- Tommy James and the Shondells
- Herman's Hermits
- Sheryl Crow
- Third Eye Blind
- Chris Isaak
- Little River Band
- UB40
- Kenny Loggins
- Toto
- Josh Turner
- Big & Rich
- Boz Scaggs
2019
- Tommy James and the Shondells
- America
- Super Diamond
- Howard Jones
- Men Without Hats
- All Hail the Silence
- The Ozark Mountain Daredevils
- Melissa Etheridge
- Don Felder
- Seal
- The Oak Ridge Boys
- Styx
- Atlanta Rhythm Section
- Black Oak Arkansas
- Blackfoot
- Chris Isaak
- War

== See also ==
- List of botanical gardens in the United States
