= Gifford Pinchot State Park =

State park in York County, Pennsylvania,

- Location within Pennsylvania Location within the United States
- Interactive map of Gifford Pinchot State Park
- Location: Warrington Township, York County, Pennsylvania, United States
- Coordinates: 40°05′13″N 76°53′17″W
- Area: 2,338 acres (946 ha)
- Elevation: 492 feet (150 m)
- Established: 1961
- Administrator: Pennsylvania Department of Conservation and Natural Resources
- Website: Official website
- Pennsylvania State Parks

Gifford Pinchot State Park is a 2,338-acre (946 ha) Pennsylvania state park in northern York County, Pennsylvania, in the United States.

It was named in honor of noted conservationist and former Pennsylvania Governor Gifford Pinchot. The fourth chief of the United States Division of Forestry, Pinchot was susbsequently appointed as the first head of the United States Forest Service.

Ground was broken for the new park by Pennsylvania Governor George M. Leader in May 1958, and a preliminary dedication ceremony was held on grounds of the new park in October 1958, during which Leader was presented with a commemorative plaque in memory of Pinchot by the Pennsylvania Forestry Association. The park officially opened to the public on Friday, May 26, 1961.

== History ==
Planned as a new state facility during the 1950s, ground was broken for the state park in mid-May 1958 by Pennsylvania Governor George M. Leader. At the time, Leader said of Pinchot:

"As a Pennsylvanian, I am proud that we have named this Park the Gifford Pinchot State Park, as a tribute to one of Pennsylvania's greatest governors.

Although Pinchot is frequently remembered in Pennsylvania as the man who promised 'to get the farmer out of the mud' and kept that promise, he is probably most famous for his work in conservation. Theodore Roosevelt once said 'Gifford Pinchot is the man to whom the nation owes most for what had been accomplished regards the preservation of the natural resources of our country.'

As he served his nation, so he served his state."

Additional land for the park was then subsequently acquired during the summer of 1958. Leader then presided over a preliminary dedication of park grounds when he accepted a commemorative plaque, which paid tribute to Pinchot, from the Pennsylvania Forestry Association in mid-October of that same year.

The park officially opened to the public in York County on Friday, May 26, 1961. Visitors were initially able to eat and socialize in the 2,300-acre park's picnic areas, as well as boat and swim in the park's three-mile-long lake, but were not yet able to camp or fish because campground areas were still under construction and the lake had not yet been stocked with fish fry by the Pennsylvania Fish Commission.

A new toboggan slide was installed during the winter of 1963.

In 1968, three hundred and fifty new camping sites for tents and trailers were added at a cost of $626,591. An old stone farmhouse was razed, and a new registration structure, seven washhouses and a series of new roads were also built as part of the project, and new water and sewer lines were installed.

A new series of nature education programs for children and adults was launched in the spring of 1969.

In 1980, the National Handicapped Camp-O-Thon was held at Gifford Pinchot State Park from August 13 to 17. Hosted by the Bureau of State Parks and the Pennsylvania Recreation and Park Society, Inc., the event was supported by a grant from the Pennsylvania Developmental Disabilities Planning Council, which funded accessibility modifications to buildings and the provision of medical services and program supplies to enable children and adults with disabilities to participate more fully in using the park.

State park officials also added cross-country skiing as a winter amenity in 1980. Birdwatching had also become a popular pursuit at the park by this time.

== Amenities ==
The park is located on the site of farm fields and wooded hillsides. The central 340-acre (140 ha) Pinchot Lake is an important recreation site featuring a designated swim area on an artificial beach, boat launch with rentals and tours, and prime bass fishing. Surrounding the lake are campsites that accommodate tents and trailers, as well as yurts and cabins. Two 18-hole disc golf courses and volleyball courts are nearby the picnic areas for day use. There are several trails that pass through the park, including the Mason-Dixon Trail. Environmental education programs are provided at the park and a dedicated Environmental Learning Center is open on weekends in the summer for exhibit visitors. Additionally, an electric vehicle charging station has been installed for guests.

Gallery

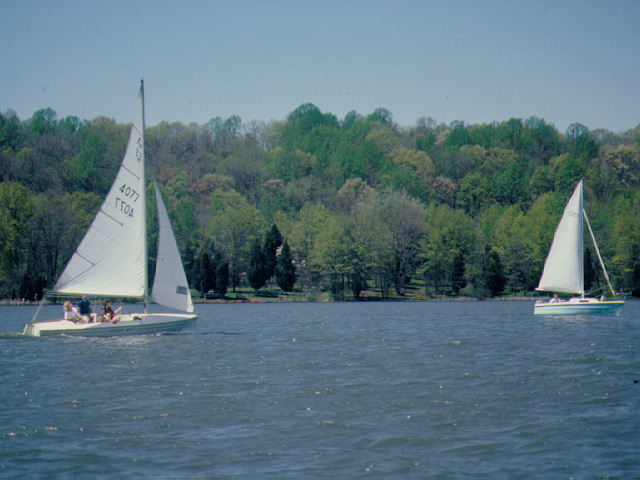
Sailboats on the lake.

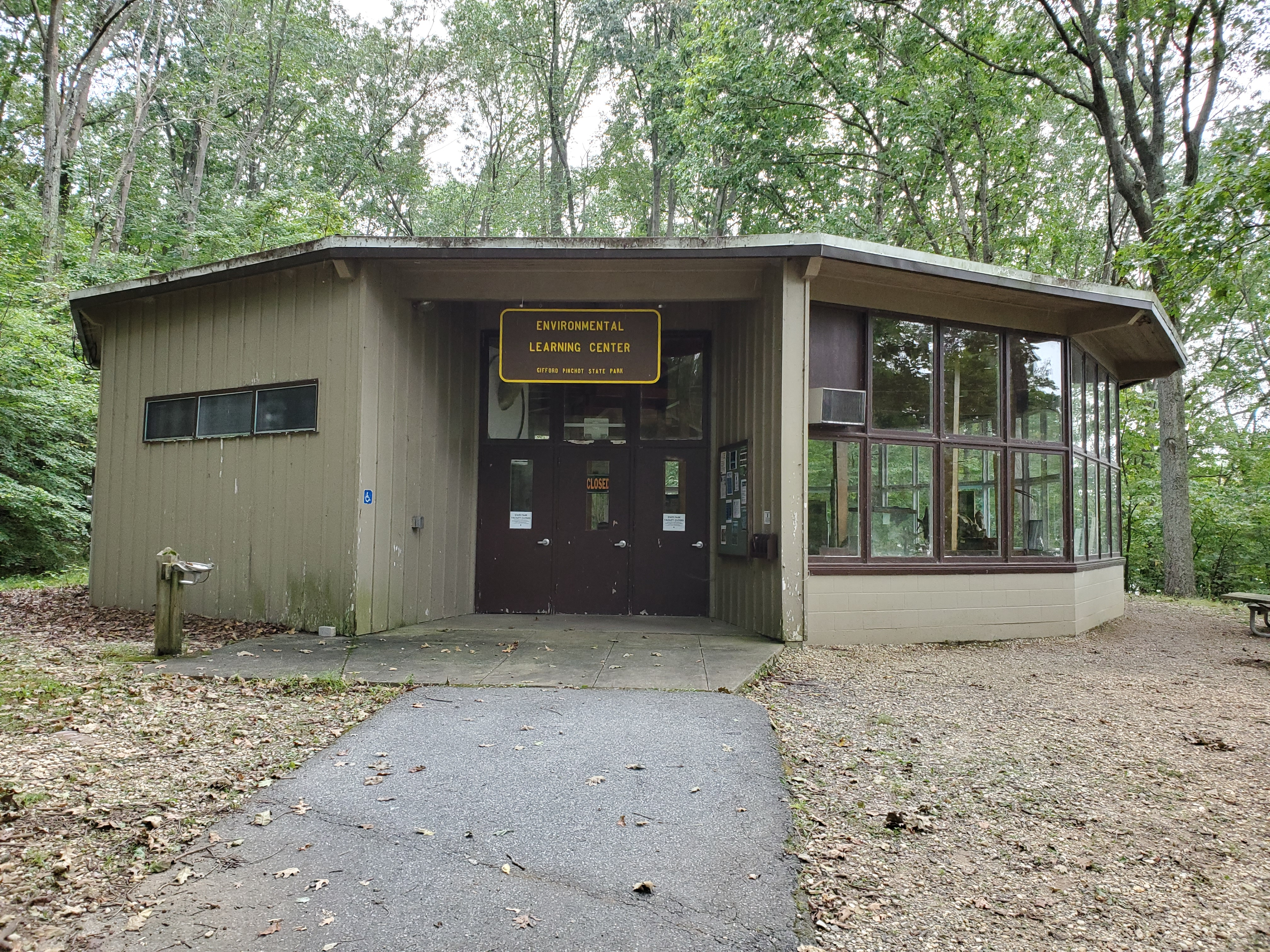
The Environmental Learning Center.

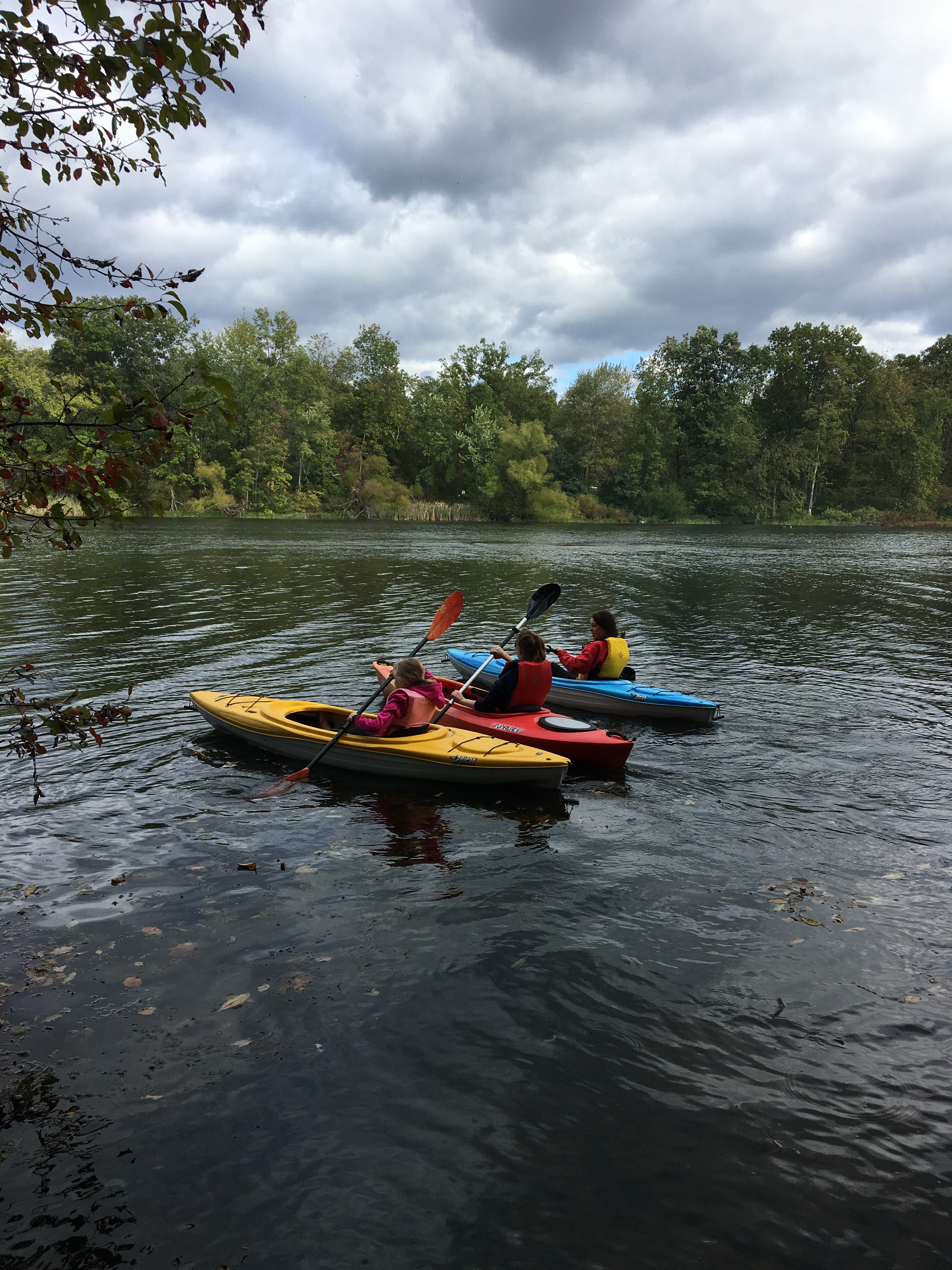
Kayaking is popular on the lake and kayaks can be rented on-site.

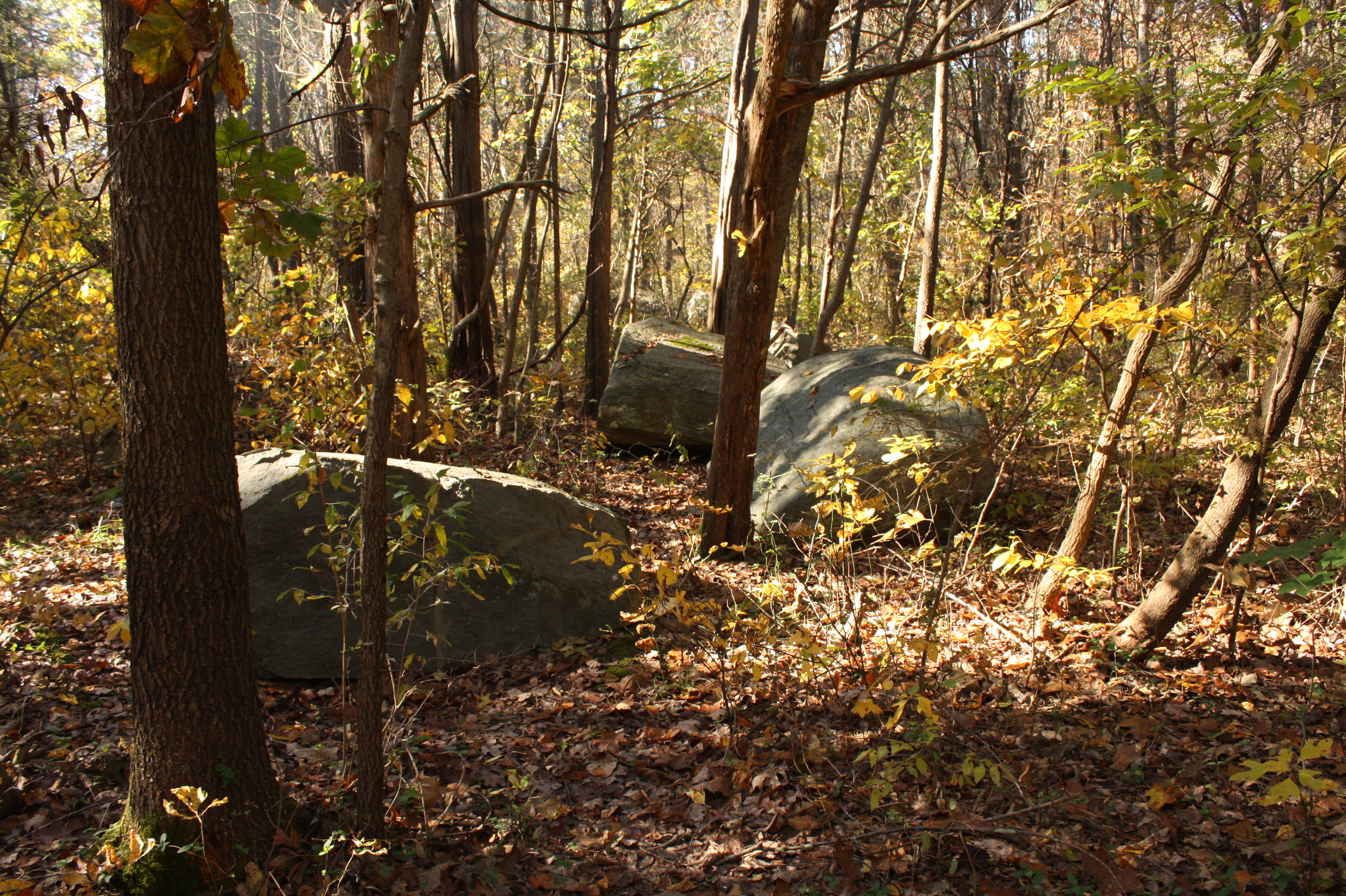
Boulders of diabase are common.

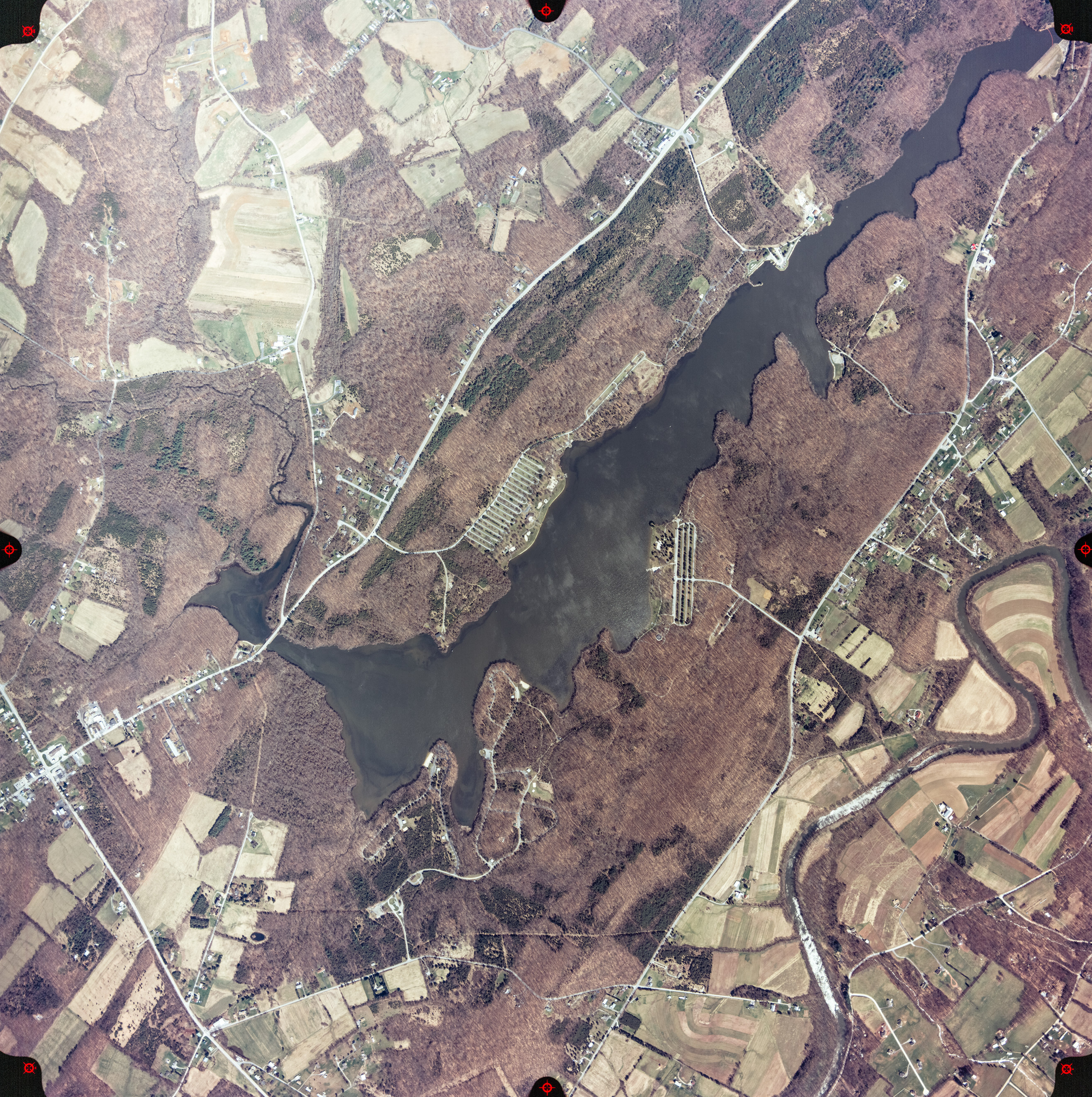
Air photo of the park in 2003
