= Theodore Solomons Trail =

Hiking trail in California, United States

- Length: 271.3 mi (436.6 km)
- Location: California, United States
- Trailheads: Glacier Point trailhead, Yosemite; Horseshoe Meadow
- Use: backpacking, hiking, trail running
- Difficulty: Moderate to strenuous
- Sights: Yosemite Valley, Sierra Nevada
- Hazards: Snowmelt, icy slopes early season, altitude

The Theodore Solomons Trail is a long-distance trail in the Sierra Nevada mountain range of California, passing through Yosemite, Kings Canyon, and Sequoia National Parks, and the Sierra National Forest. From the northern terminus at Glacier Point in Yosemite and the southern terminus located at Horseshoe Meadow, the trail's official length is 271.3 miles (436.6 km). For almost all of its length, the trail is in the Middle Sierra backcountry and wilderness areas.

The trail was developed by Dennis R. Gagnon in 1974 as a lower elevation alternative to the popular John Muir Trail, which it runs largely parallel to. The trail was named for the explorer Theodore Solomons.

== See also ==
- Ecology of the Sierra Nevada
- Long-distance trails in the United States
- Sierra High Route
