= Hayduke Trail =

Backpacking trail in Utah and Arizona

Coordinates: 38°N 111°W

- Length: 812 miles (1,307 km)
- Use: Hiking
- Elevation gain/loss: 38,128 metres (125,092 ft)
- Website: http://www.hayduketrail.org/

The Hayduke Trail is an 812-mile (1,307 km) backpacking route across southern Utah and northern Arizona, United States. It begins in Arches National Park near Moab, Utah, before heading through the Needles district of Canyonlands National Park, Capitol Reef National Park, Bryce Canyon National Park, the Grand Canyon National Park, and Zion National Park.

This highly strenuous wilderness route is exclusively on public land and travels ridgelines, drainages, existing foot and game trails, dirt roads, and rivers. The highest point is Mount Ellen in the Henry Mountains at 11,419 feet (3,481 m) above sea level to a low in the Grand Canyon of 1,800 feet (550 m).

The official site for the trail warns:

Because of the extremely challenging and dangerous nature of this route, you must be a very experienced desert backpacker in peak physical condition before attempting any section of the Hayduke Trail! Thru-hikers beware! The Hayduke Trail traverses intensely rugged terrain, is largely off-trail, is not signed and ranges in elevation from 1,800 feet in the Grand Canyon to 11,419 atop Mt. Ellen's South Summit!

The Hayduke Trail was named after George Washington Hayduke, a character from Edward Abbey's The Monkey Wrench Gang. It was created by Mike Coronella and Joe Mitchell, both of Utah, as the combination of several treks including a 94-day expedition in 1998 and a 101-day journey in 2000.

The Hayduke Trail: a Guide to the Backcountry Hiking Trail on the Colorado Plateau was published by the University of Utah Press in 2005.

The trail is unmaintained, as opposed to official trails such as the Appalachian Trail or the Pacific Crest Trail. However, the National Park Service is aware of the Hayduke Trail, as the NPS website references the trail by name on the Capitol Reef and Bryce Canyon backpacking pages.

== See also ==
- Long-distance trails in the United States
