= Middle Creek Wildlife Management Area =

Wildlife Management Area in Pennsylvania

Coordinates: 40°16′16″N 76°15′00″W

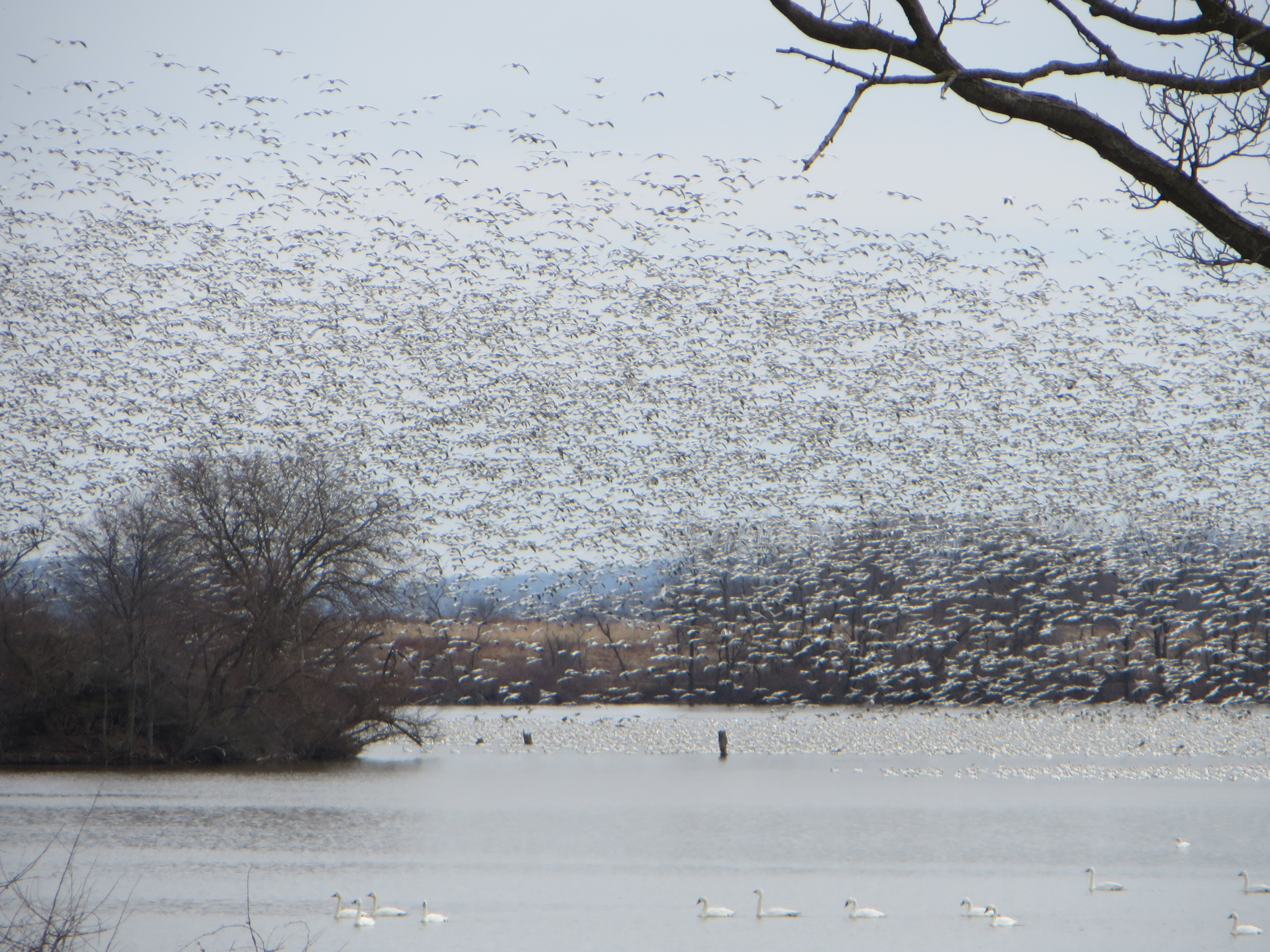
Snow geese and tundra swans at the Middle Creek Wildlife Management Area, March 2016

The Middle Creek Wildlife Management Area is a 6,000-acre (24 km^{2}) Wildlife Management Area located in Lancaster and Lebanon counties, Pennsylvania. It is managed by the Pennsylvania Game Commission.

The area lakes seasonally get up to 200,000 migrating snow geese. The largest of the lakes was created by a dam built in the early 1970s, and covers 360 acres (150 ha). The Horse-Shoe Trail goes through the area just south of the main impoundment dam.
