= Platte Canyon =

Canyon in Colorado, United States

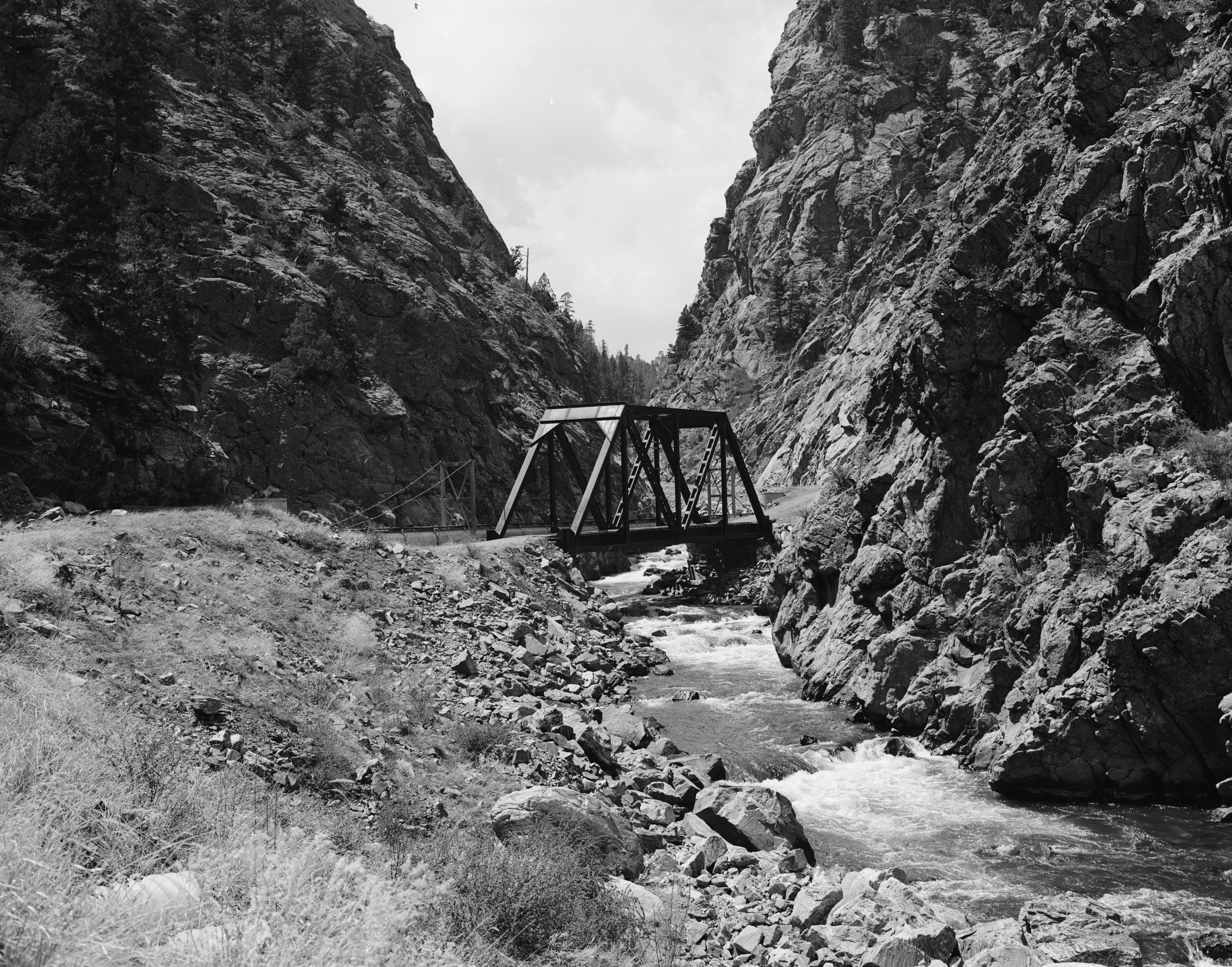
- The South Platte River in Platte Canyon, Colorado, ca. 1978.
- Floor elevation: 5,509 ft (1,679 m)

Geography
- Location: Colorado
- Coordinates: 39°24′29.19″N 105°10′16.02″W GNIS
- Mountain range: Rocky Mountains
- River: South Platte River
- Interactive map of Platte Canyon

The Platte Canyon is a deep, narrow, scenic gorge on the South Platte River in the Rocky Mountains of Colorado. The canyon is southwest of Denver in Douglas County The canyon is at the entrance to the mountains, where the South Platte emerges through the Rampart Range through the hogbacks onto Eastern Plains. The lower narrow section is sometimes called Waterton Canyon, referring to Waterton, Colorado.

== Geography ==
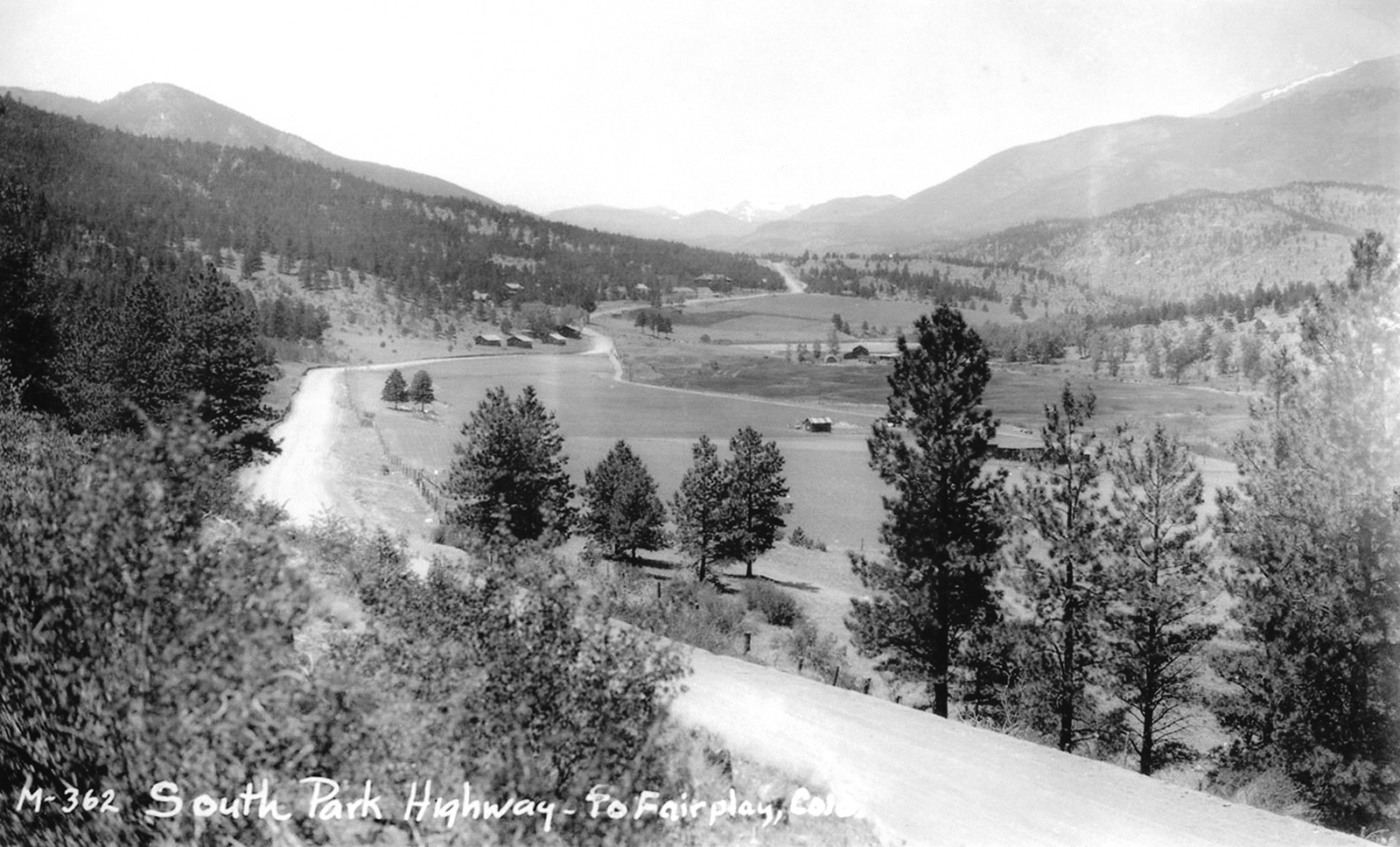
The South Park Highway cut through the Platte Canyon in the early 1900s. (Park County Local History Digital Archive)

The term Platte Canyon is used varyingly to apply to the entire section of the South Platte and the North Fork South Platte in the mountains between South Park and the eastern plains. It also is often applied to the communities along the North Fork near Bailey. The narrowest part of the canyon is a remote and roadless gorge (Waterton Canyon) -- it is neither, having a dirt road wide enough for two vehicles ans is close to highway C470:and the city of Littleton--approximately 8 miles (13 km) long, at its lower extremity between the hamlet of South Platte and Kassler, where it emerges from the mountains. In this section, the canyon has walls that rise approximately 1,000 feet (300 m) from the river bed. The river drops from an elevation of approximately 6100 ft at South Platte at the head of the gorge to approximately 5,500 feet (1,700 m) at the canyon mouth. In this area is a diversion dam that backs up water in the South Platte River, allowing some of it to be sent down the High Line Canal.

== Railroad ==
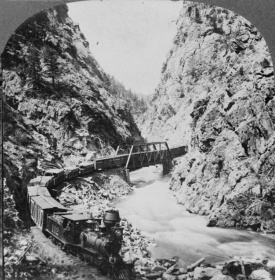
Railroad in Platte Canyon, Colorado ~ 1923

In the middle and late 1870s, the Denver, South Park and Pacific Railroad constructed the first railroad through the canyon and through the valley of the North Fork to South Park and eventually to Leadville and Gunnison. The line was initially a narrow gauge, and was later acquired by the Colorado and Southern Railway. Service on the line was terminated in 1937.

== Potential dam ==
In the late 1920s, the Denver Board of Water Commissioners proposed building a dam to inundate the canyon, but the request was turned down by the Public Utilities Commission. A 1.7 miles (2.7 km) section of Waterton Canyon was inundated by the Strontia Springs Reservoir, completed in 1983 as part of the Foothills Project for water diversion.
