= Warrior Trail =

Footpath in the United States

- Length: 67 mi (108 km)
- Location: Greene County, Pennsylvania, Marshall County, West Virginia, US
- Use: Hiking
- Elevation change: Moderate
- Difficulty: Moderate
- Season: Year-round
- Hazards: Rattlesnakes, mosquitoes, ticks

The Warrior Trail is an approximately 67-mile (108 km) historical path and hiking route in southwestern Pennsylvania and the Northern Pandhandle region of West Virginia.

== History and route ==
The Warrior Trail roughly follows an old Native American route that dates back at least 5,000 years and is one of the oldest known footpaths in the United States. The route was used by the peoples of southwestern Pennsylvania to obtain products originating in central Ohio, and the original route continued into that state after a crossing of the Ohio River near the present Moundsville, West Virginia. The Warrior Trail has been noted for its resemblance to a European pastoral hike as opposed to the rugged forested footpaths common in the northeastern United States.

Walking westbound, the route begins near Greensboro, Pennsylvania at a public park alongside the Monongahela River, and follows mostly high ground through rural Greene County, with no stream crossings and many pastoral vistas. There are three dilapidated shelters located at roughly equal intervals along the Pennsylvania segment.

The route is only partially blazed and signed, and the Warrior Trail is largely considered to be an item of historical interest rather than a fully developed hiking trail. Most of the route is on rural roads, with occasional segments of footpath, most of which cross private land. About 12 miles west of Greensboro, the route uses a road overpass at Interstate 79, and a short distance later there is a dangerous crossing of US Route 19. At approximately 47 miles the route crosses the state line into West Virginia, and continues for approximately another 20 miles across similar terrain in Marshall County, ending near the Ohio River just south of Moundsville.
