= Corvallis to the Sea Trail =

Long-distance hiking trail

Corvallis to the Sea Trail is a 60-mile (97 km) hiking and cycling trail in Western Oregon (United States) that links the Willamette Valley to the Pacific Ocean. It offers a maintained public right-of-way for non-motorized recreational transit from Corvallis to Ona Beach. The complete trail opened officially in August 2021. It crosses a patchwork of public and private land. Roughly half of the trail's length exists within Siuslaw National Forest.

The project to establish the trail had more than 40,000 volunteer hours and $20,000 in donations.

The trail creation effort began in 1974, but failed due to difficulties with various private land owner agreements. In 2004 the nonprofit C2C Trail Partnership was founded. It was able to work successfully with Siuslaw National Forest officials and eventually all adjacent land owners.
