= Holtwood Environmental Preserve =

Environment

Coordinates: 39.834°N 76.318°W

Holtwood Environmental Preserve is a protected area owned by PPL in southeastern Pennsylvania. It covers over 5,000 acres (2,000 ha) near the Holtwood Dam on the Susquehanna River in Lancaster and York Counties, and includes 200 acres (81 ha) of mesophytic old-growth forest including eastern hemlock, chestnut oak, and umbrella magnolia along the Otter Creek gorge. Visitor activities include camping, boating, and hiking. It is a nesting site for bald eagles and ospreys. The Preserve contains the Shenks Ferry Wildlife Preserve, the Indian Steps Museum of Native American Artifacts, and the Lock 12 Historic Area.

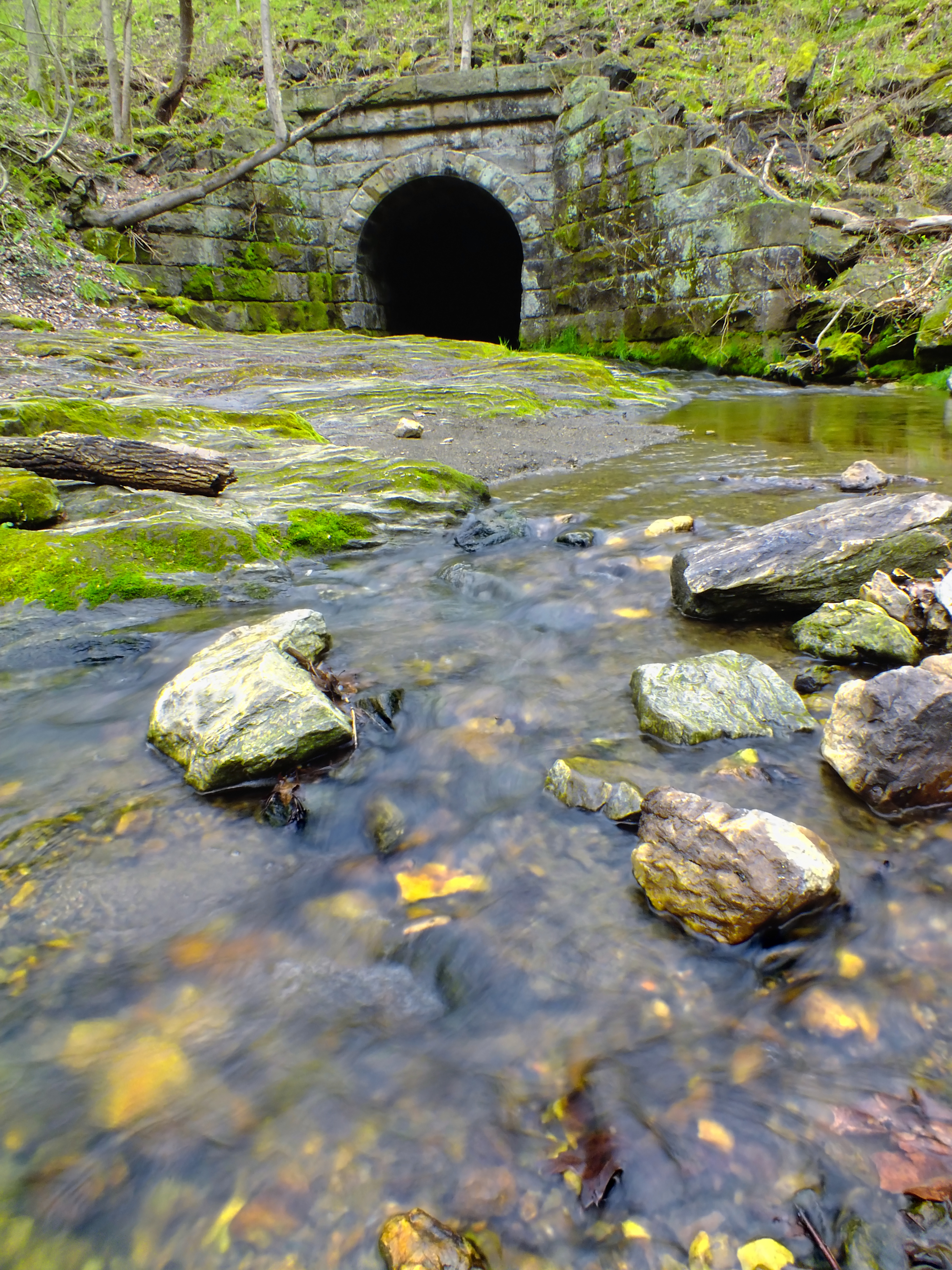
Grubb Run within the preserve
