= Horse-Shoe Trail =

Long-distance hiking trail in the United States

Coordinates: 40°15′16″N 76°17′05″W

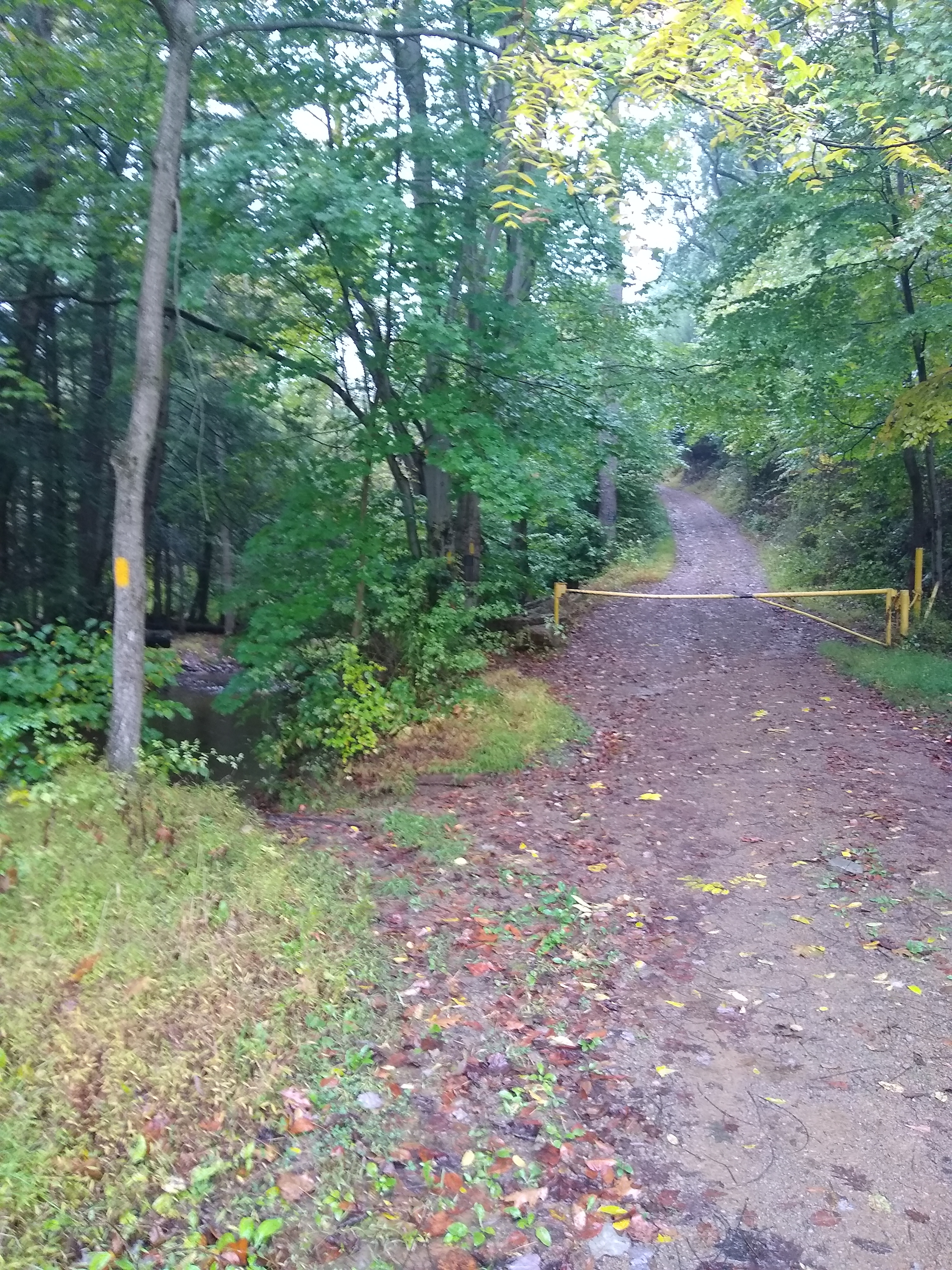
- The Horse-Shoe Trail (the narrow footpath at left) alongside Manada Creek, Dauphin County
- Length: 140 mi (230 km)
- Location: Chester County, Berks County, Lancaster County, Lebanon County, and Dauphin County, Pennsylvania, US
- Trailheads: Valley Forge National Historical Park, Appalachian Trail
- Use: Hiking, horse riding
- Elevation change: Moderate
- Difficulty: Moderate to strenuous (western half), easy to moderate (eastern half)
- Season: Year-round
- Hazards: Uneven and wet terrain, rattlesnakes, mosquitoes, ticks

The Horse-Shoe Trail is a 140-mile (230 km) hiking and horseback riding trail in southeastern Pennsylvania, United States. It begins at Valley Forge National Park and ends at a junction with the Appalachian Trail near Harrisburg. Most of the trail is in an agricultural region with gently rolling topography, where it generally follows rural roads and old country lanes, but the western end is much more mountainous and rugged. A 17-mile segment of the trail in Chester and Berks counties has been designated as a National Recreation Trail.

== History ==
The Horse-Shoe Trail Club was founded in 1935 with the goal of building a trail to connect the Philadelphia region in southeastern Pennsylvania with the Appalachian Trail to the west. The Horse-Shoe Trail was christened in 1947 and was routed to take users through farmlands and historic monuments throughout the southeastern portion of the state, particularly sites associated with the Revolutionary War. The route passes through many tracts of private property, a few small towns, some State Game Lands, and various state and county parks. Primitive camping is prohibited along most of the route. The Horse-Shoe Trail is under perennial threat due to the changing wishes of rural landowners, and encroaching development around its eastern end in the Philadelphia area.

== Route ==
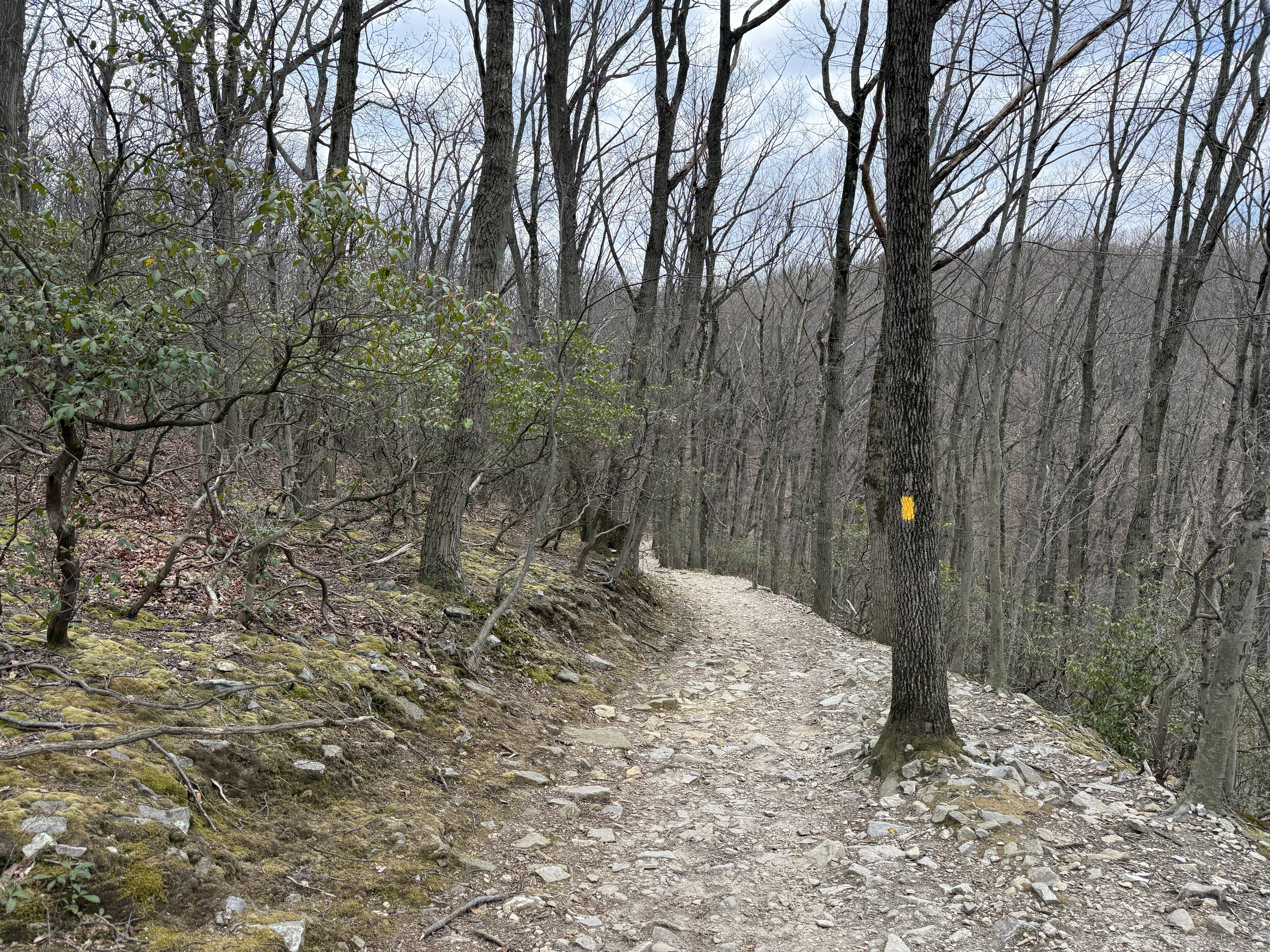
Horse-Shoe Trail in Valley Forge National Historical Park

The Horse-Shoe Trail is traditionally described in the westbound direction. It begins in Valley Forge National Park and heads west, traversing historic battlefields from the Revolutionary War. After leaving the national park, the route follows a variety of rural roads, with some wooded and undeveloped segments. In northern Chester County, the trail passes the Wharton Esherick Museum. It subsequently winds through the Hopewell Big Woods and Welkinweir arboretum, and later reaches the Hopewell Furnace National Historic Site. After entering Berks County, the trail follows a meandering route through French Creek State Park. After utilizing a rural road's overpass to cross Interstate 176, the trail proceeds through scenic farming areas in southern Berks County and northern Lancaster County with relatively little road walking. In this area it also passes through Middle Creek Wildlife Management Area.

Just after crossing US 322 near Brickerville, the Horse-Shoe Trail reaches a junction with the Conestoga Trail System at Upper Hopewell Forge Wildlife Sanctuary and a memorial to local pioneer Peter Grubb. The Horse-Shoe Trail then passes into the ridge and valley region and experiences its first truly rugged terrain as it ascends and descends a ridge along the border into Lebanon County. The trail then descends into another farming district and continues to the northwest on various rights-of-way, old country lanes, and occasional road segments. After entering Dauphin County, the trail passes through a heavily developed suburban area just east of Hershey and crosses US 422. To the northwest of Hershey, the trail mostly follows roads until reaching large wooded areas near Pennsylvania Route 443.

Beyond PA 443, the Horse-Shoe Trail traverses undeveloped areas within the Fort Indiantown Gap military base. For its final 16 miles, the trail transforms noticeably into a rugged backpacking route that is typical for central Pennsylvania, with very rocky ascents and descents of Second Mountain and Sharp Mountain. In this area, the trail passes through State Game Lands No. 211. The Horse-Shoe Trail ends at a junction with the Appalachian Trail in Dauphin County, about 3.3 miles east of that trail's nearest road crossing at Pennsylvania Route 325.
