= Mason–Dixon Trail =

Trail in Pennsylvania, Maryland, and Delaware

Coordinates: 39.53899°N 75.66730°W

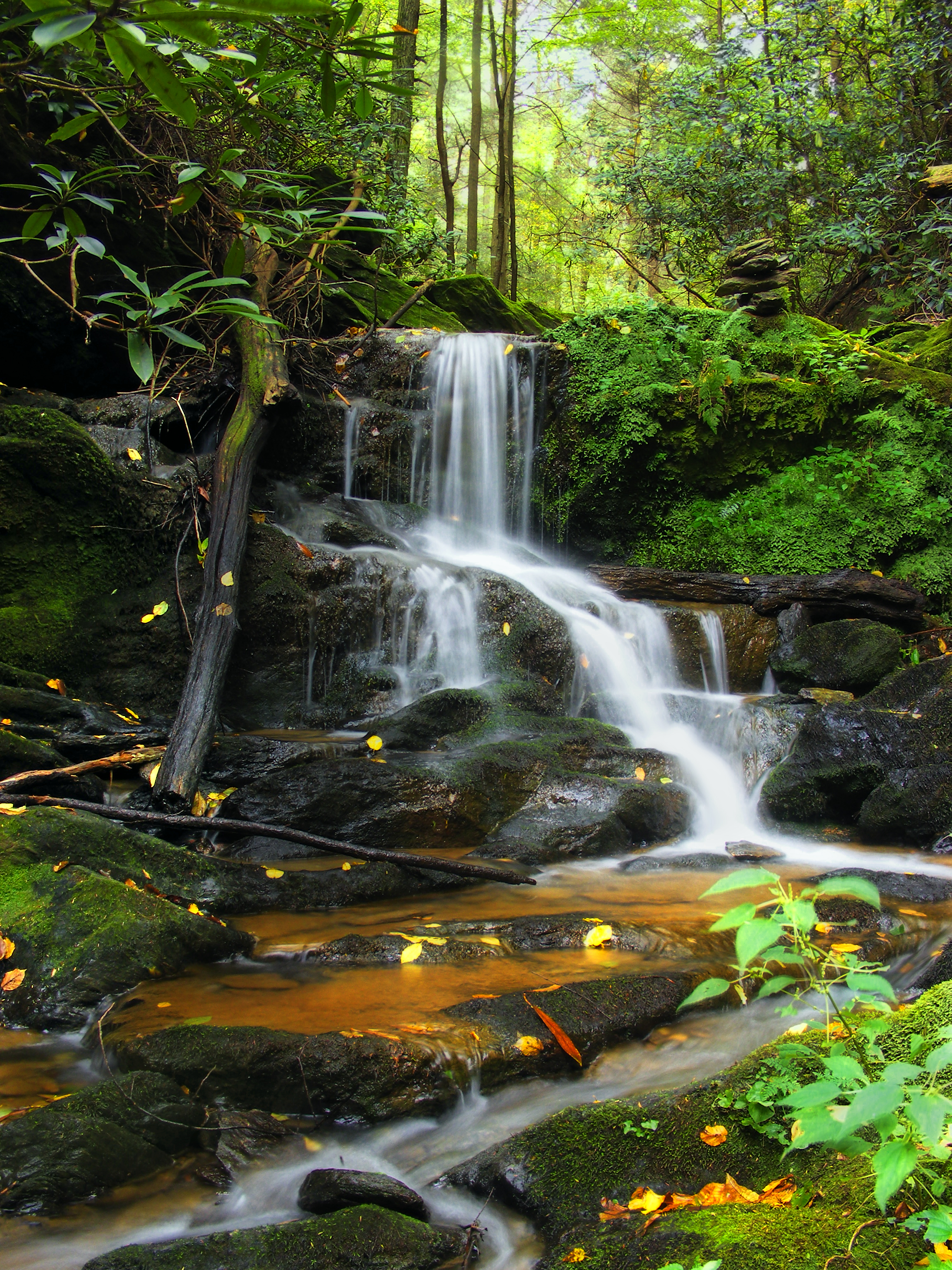
- Upper Mill Creek Falls as seen from the Mason–Dixon Trail in York County, Pennsylvania (2009)
- Length: 193 mi (311 km)
- Location: Pennsylvania, Maryland, and Delaware; US
- Designation: National Recreation Trail
- Trailheads: Appalachian Trail, Chadds Ford, Pennsylvania
- Use: Hiking
- Elevation change: Moderate
- Difficulty: Moderate
- Season: Year-round
- Hazards: Road walking, mosquitoes, ticks

The Mason–Dixon Trail is a 193-mile (311 km) hiking trail that begins at the Appalachian Trail in south-central Pennsylvania, continues through northeastern Maryland and northern Delaware, and re-enters Pennsylvania shortly before ending at Chadds Ford. It is named for the historic Mason–Dixon line, which it crosses twice. About one-third of the route follows roads through rural areas, but the rest is on traditional footpaths. The trail also traverses many tracts of private land, at which passage for hikers has been arranged with owners. This results in occasional relocations. The trail takes hikers through a variety of rural and semi-urban landscapes, with most of the route in Pennsylvania featuring farmlands and forested areas, and most of the route in Maryland and Delaware featuring historic sites and small towns.

== Route ==
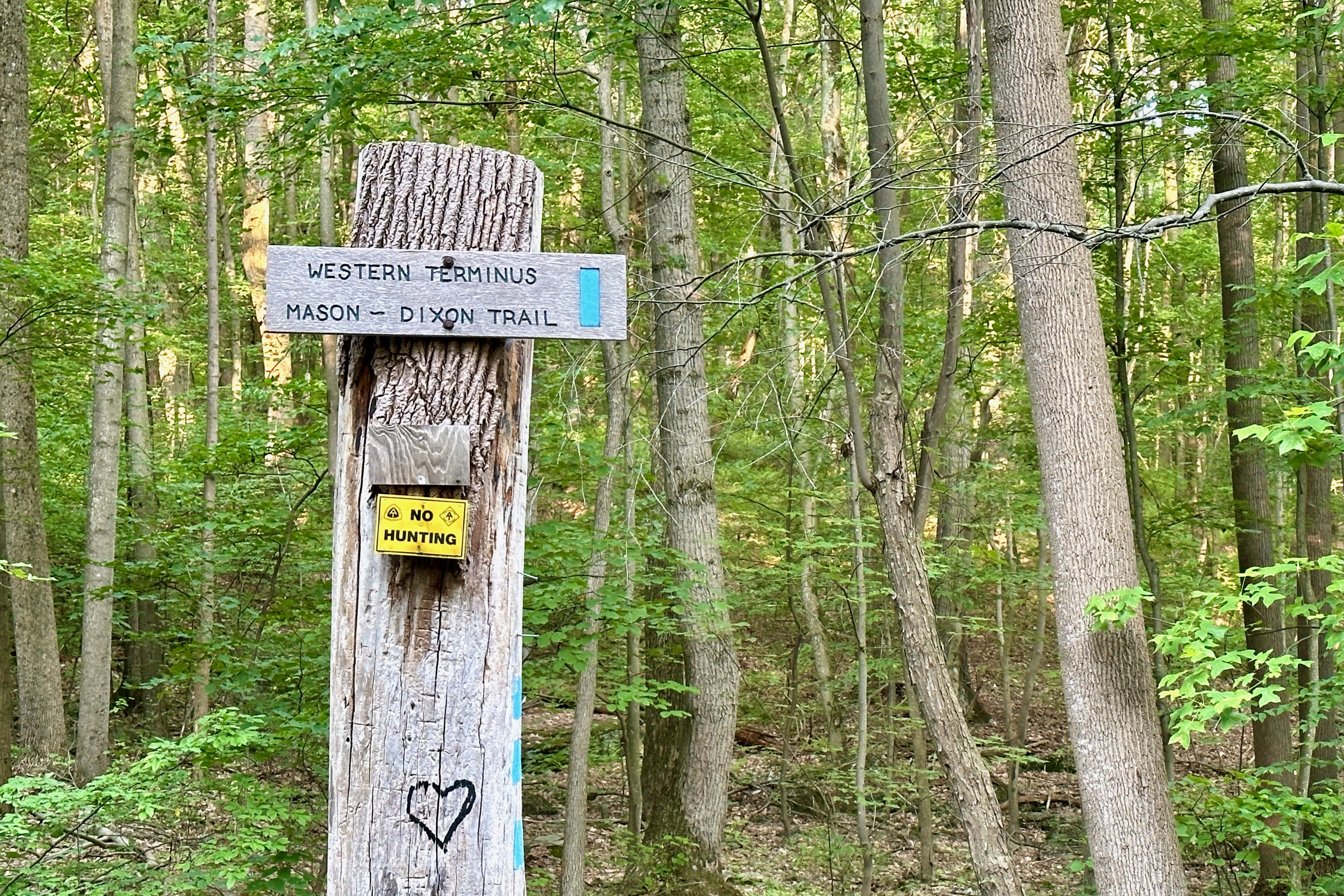
Western terminus at Whisky Spring

The Mason–Dixon Trail begins near Boiling Springs, Pennsylvania, at a junction with the Appalachian Trail at Whisky Spring on South Mountain. Heading east, the Mason–Dixon Trail soon descends into an agricultural area and passes through Gifford Pinchot State Park. Except for the park, in this general area the trail mostly follows rural roads. It briefly follows Pennsylvania Route 297 over Interstate 83 and through the village of Strinestown, and continues on rural roads to an escarpment above the Susquehanna River.

The trail then travels primarily to the southeast, parallel to the right bank of the Susquehanna. It passes near the Codorus Forge and Furnace Historic District, then follows another series of roads under US 30 and through the town of Wrightsville. The 30-mile section of the trail that follows the lower Susquehanna River Gorge from Wrightsville to the Norman Wood bridge was designated a National Recreation Trail in 2010. After two walks along Pennsylvania Route 624, the trail reaches the top of the Susquehanna River Gorge and continues mostly alongside the gorge for a considerable distance into Maryland. Just south of Holtwood Dam, the trail reaches a junction with the Conestoga Trail System at a parking area for Susquehanna and Tidewater Canal Lock 12.

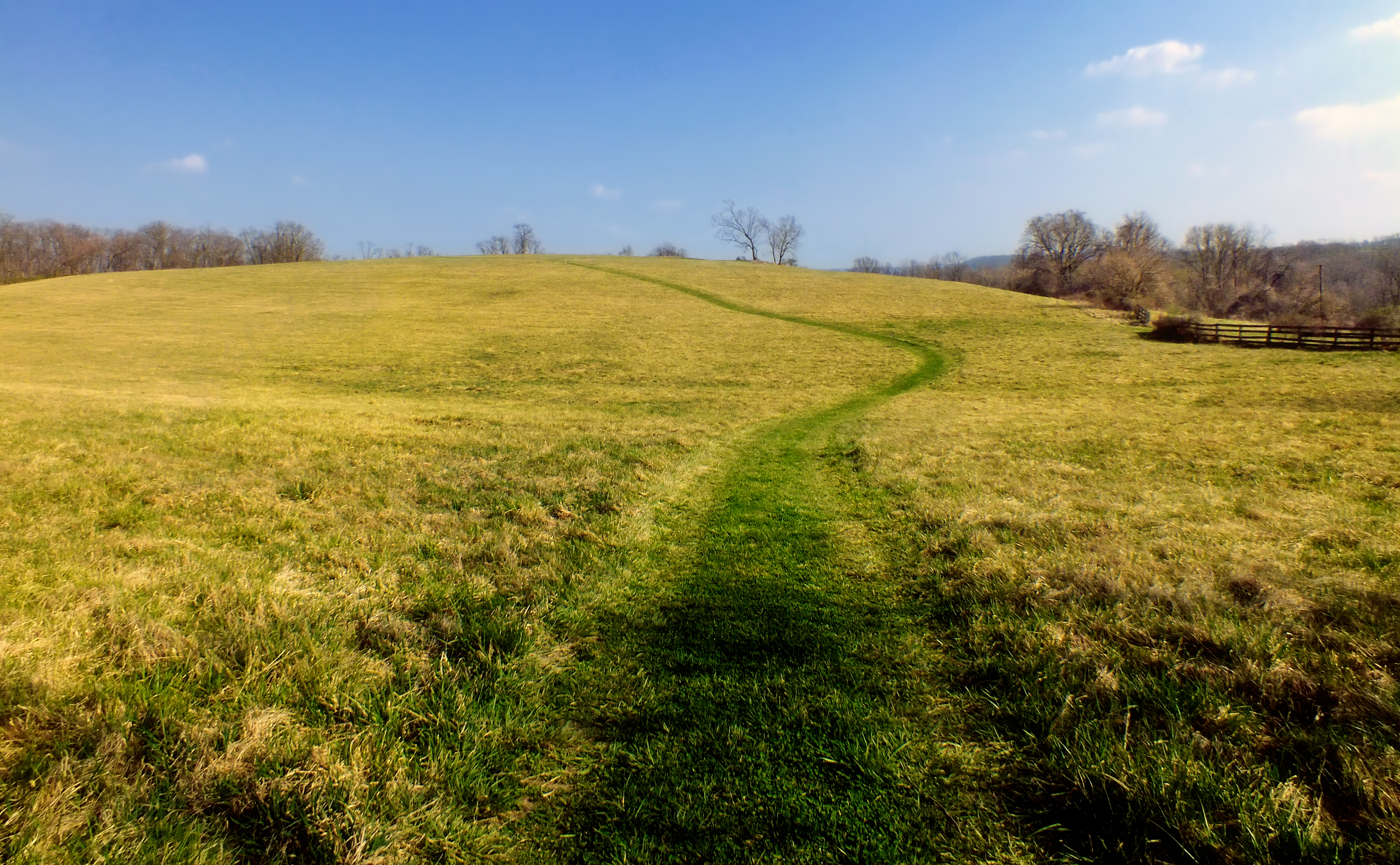
The Mason–Dixon Trail in York County, Pennsylvania.

The Mason–Dixon Trail continues to generally follow the Susquehanna, except for a trip inland at Muddy Creek and its substantial side gorge, with a brief walk along Pennsylvania Route 74 near the village of Castle Fin. The trail then returns to the Susquehanna and crosses the border into Maryland at about 115 miles from its western terminus.

In Maryland, the trail continues to follow the right bank of the Susquehanna, nearly to its outlet at the Chesapeake Bay, passing through Susquehanna State Park along the way. At Havre de Grace, the trail crosses the Susquehanna via US 40 and now heads to the east via various rural roads and occasional footpaths through Cecil County. A few miles after walking through the village of North East, there is a longer sojourn on footpaths through Elk Neck State Forest. The trail then follows urban and suburban streets toward and through Elkton, and then crosses the border into Delaware. (Note: The route description for Maryland and Delaware is gleaned from a map available at Fastest Known Time.)

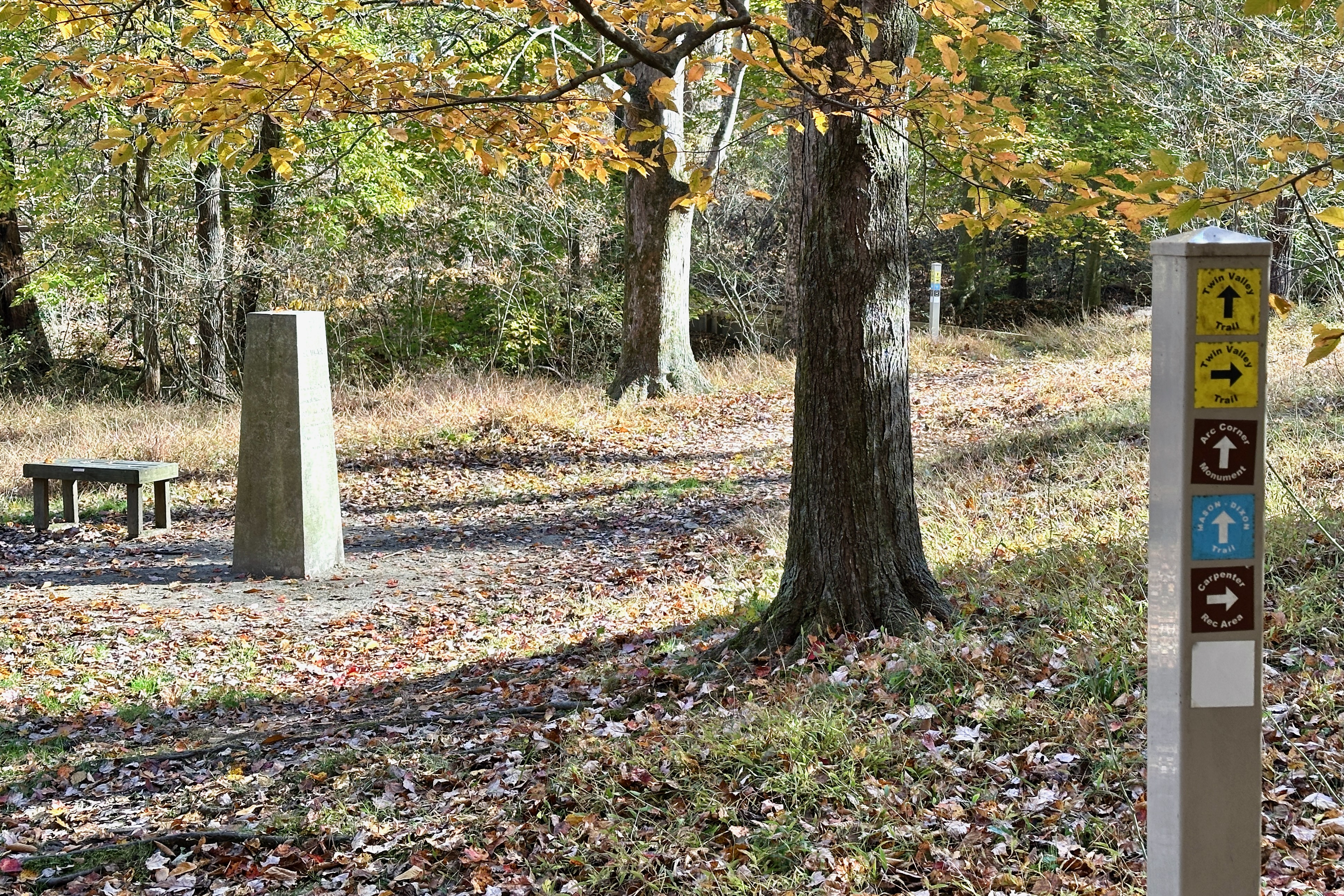
The Mason–Dixon Trail passing the Arc Corner Monument in the Delaware Wedge

The Mason–Dixon Trail then turns north and follows various roads in the Newark area, with segments through several public parks. The trail follows a lengthy and meandering route through scenic areas in White Clay Creek State Park in the Delaware Wedge area. The trail crosses the border into Pennsylvania and follows footpaths in and around White Clay Creek Preserve and undeveloped areas in southern Chester County. The trail passes back into Delaware for a walk along various roads in the Hockessin area, followed by a brief segment through Auburn Valley State Park. The trail then crosses the border into Pennsylvania yet again, following footpaths through Stateline Woods Preserve, followed by various rural roads until it ends in a small wooded area off of US 1, just west of Chadds Ford. (Note: The route description for Chester County in Pennsylvania is gleaned from the same map at Fastest Known Time.)

== See also ==
- Mason–Dixon line
