= Uwharrie Trail =

Hiking trail in North Carolina, United States

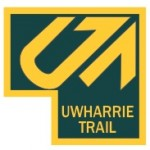
- Early logo of the Uwharrie Trail Club.
- Length: 40 mi (64 km)
- Location: Uwharrie Mountains, Uwharrie National Forest, Randolph County, Montgomery County, North Carolina, United States
- Trailheads: Tot Hill, Joe Moffitt- Thayer Rd., Jumping Off Rock, NC 109, NC 24/27
- Use: Hiking
- Highest point: King Mountain, 1,020 ft (310 m)
- Lowest point: near Big Island Creek, 384 ft (117 m)

The Uwharrie Trail is a hiking trail located in the Uwharrie Mountains in central North Carolina. The original Uwharrie Trail was an approximately 40-mile (80.5-km) long hiking trail that was completed in 1975. The trail began at the Asheboro Regional airport near Tot Hill Farm road and ended at NC 24-27 in Montgomery County near Troy, NC. It was once fragmented south of the Birkhead Wilderness to Jumpin Off Rock Trailhead on Flint Hill Rd.

The 20.5-mile (33-km) Uwharrie National Recreation Trail is contained inside the Uwharrie National Forest and comprises the southern portion of the Uwharrie Trail from Jumpin' Off Rock Trail Head to NC 24/27.

A northern portion of the original trail passed through what is now the Birkhead Mountains Wilderness and is now called The Birkhead Mountain Trail as it no longer connects to the Uwharrie Trail.

Current Status

Three gaps existed from High Pine Church Rd. to Jumpin Off Rock Trailhead. One additional gap exists north of High Pine Church Rd. to the southern Birkhead Wilderness boundary. Volunteers, The LandTrust for Central NC, Forest Service and others have been working since 1998 to reconnect this 11-mile section of trail and return the trail to its historic length.

An 8.5-mile section between Jumpin' Off Rock and High Pine Church Rd., including the new Walkers Creek Trailhead on High Pine Church Road, has been completed and opened to the public in the spring of 2021. A new trailhead opened in 2013 on Thayer Rd. at the base of Little Long Mountain. The trailhead was developed by The Landtrust for Central North Carolina and named for Scout leader and trail pioneer Joe Moffitt in 2013.

The remaining gap in the original Uwharrie Trail is from High Pine Church Rd. north to the southern boundary of the Birkhead Mountains Wilderness through the Strieby Community.

== History ==
Northern Section History- Tot Hill (airport) to Jumpin Off Rock

The northern Uwharrie Trail was started in the late 1960s by Joe Moffitt, who was at the time the Scoutmaster for a local Boy Scout troop in Asheboro, North Carolina. As a Scoutmaster, Mr. Moffitt sought a local 50-mile (80.5-km) hiking trail for his scouts to earn their 50 Miler award. At the time the nearest such trail was located further west in the Appalachian Mountains.

Moffitt cobbled together a trail from Tot Hill Road, through the Birkhead, to Flint Hill Road at Jumping Off Rock. There were numerous gaps in public ownership of the route. These included Tot Hill, Strieby community and church, High Pine Church Rd., King Mountain, Little Long and Long Mountains. Over the years land changed hands and access went away in many cases. Some sections of the route were not even on Forest Service maps making access difficult.

Southern Section History- Jumpin Off Rock to NC 24-27

In 1972 under the direction of District Ranger, Robert Carey, the Forest Service and conservation corps volunteers scouted and built the Uwharrie and Dutchmans Creek trail. The two make a figure 8 between Yates Place Camp and NC 24-27

Original Route

The original Uwharrie Trail was a culmination of efforts of Joe Moffitt working in the north and District Ranger Robert Strider working in the South. Together their efforts led to a connection at Jumpin Off Rock trailhead on Flint Hill Road and a completed 40 mile trail in 1975.

== Terrain and Geology ==
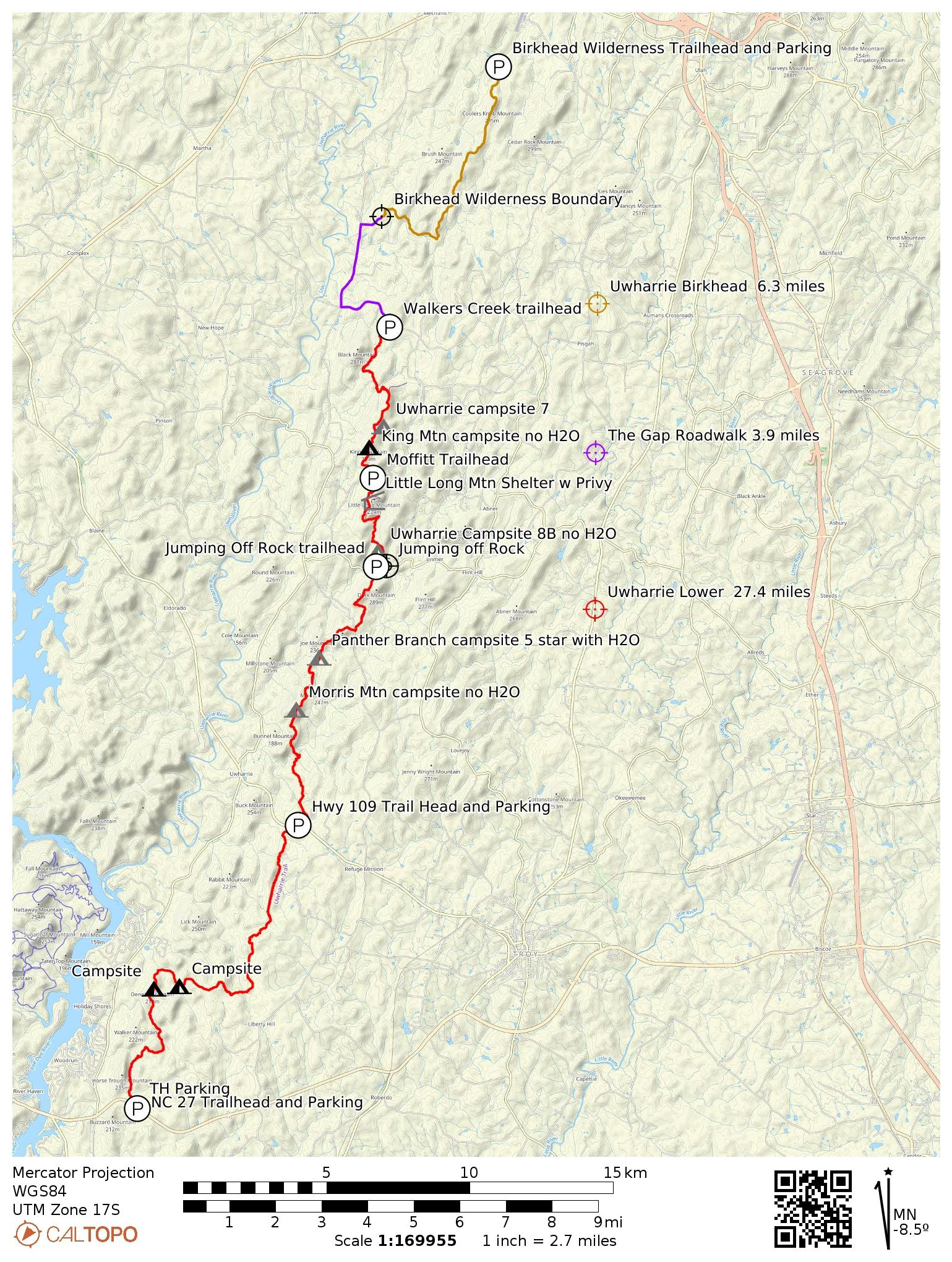
Map
