= Mechanicsville =

Mechanicsville is the name of several localities in North America.

== Canada ==
- Mechanicsville (Ottawa), a neighborhood in Ottawa, Ontario

== United States ==
- Mechanicsville, Connecticut, census-designated place in Windham County
- Mechanicsville, Delaware
- Mechanicsville (Atlanta), Georgia, a neighborhood
- Mechanicsville (Gwinnett County, Georgia), an unincorporated community
- Mechanicsville, Indiana
- Mechanicsville, Iowa
- Mechanicsville, Maryland
- Mechanicsville, Missouri
- Mechanicsville, Hunterdon County, New Jersey
- Mechanicsville, Middlesex County, New Jersey
- Mechanicsville, Monmouth County, New Jersey
- Mechanicville, New York
- Mechanicsville, Pennsylvania (disambiguation) (multiple)
- Mechanicsville, South Carolina
- Mechanicsville, Knoxville, Tennessee, a neighborhood
- Mechanicsville, Virginia (multiple)

== See also ==
- Mechanicsburg (disambiguation)
