= White Clay Creek Preserve =

State park in Chester County, Pennsylvania

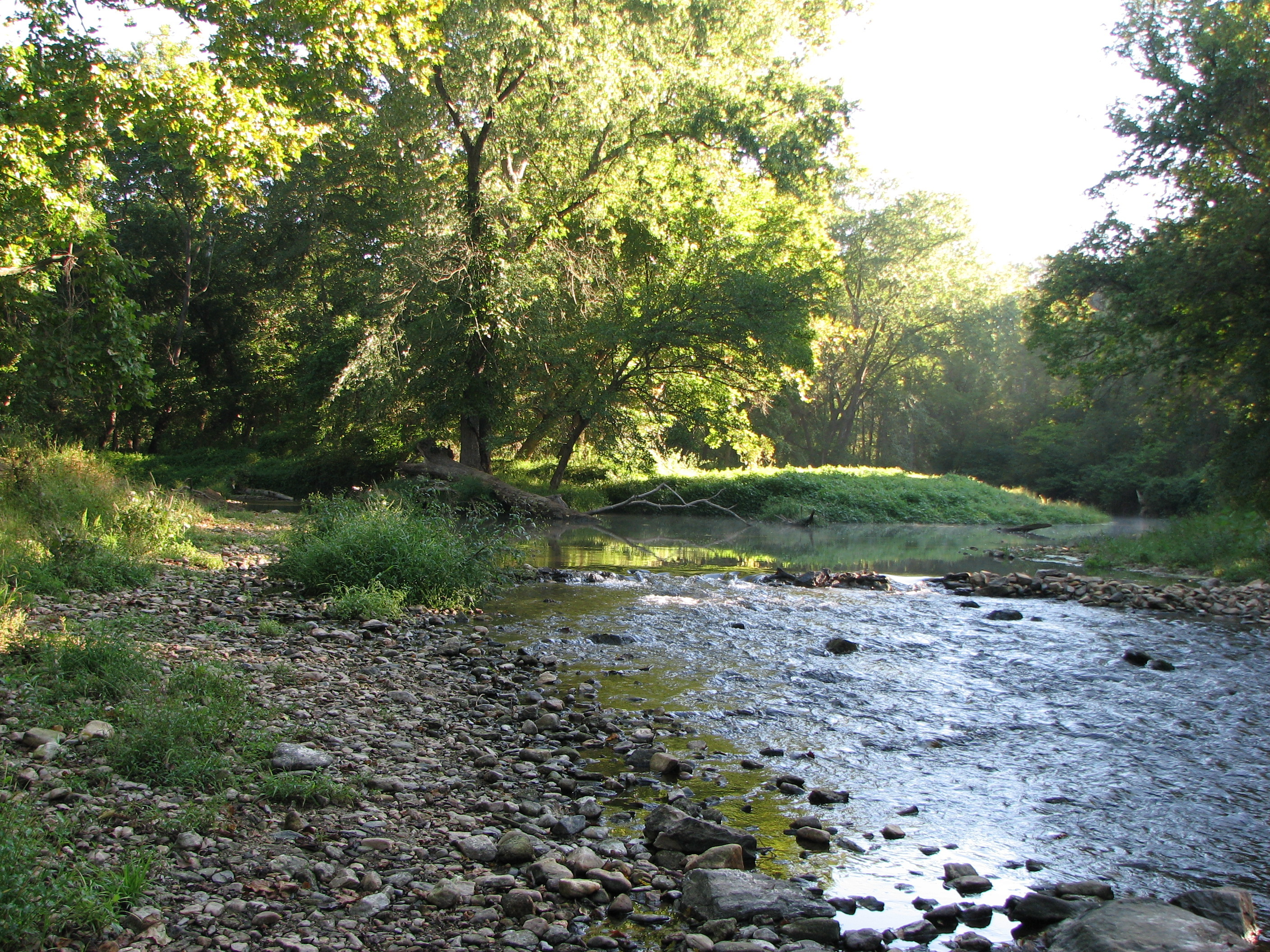
- Confluence of the East and Middle Branches White Clay Creek

- Location within Pennsylvania Location within the United States
- Interactive map of White Clay Creek Preserve
- Location: London Britain Township, Chester County, Pennsylvania, United States
- Coordinates: 39°44′48″N 75°46′27″W
- Area: 1,388 acres (562 ha)
- Elevation: 253 feet (77 m)
- Established: 1984
- Administrator: Pennsylvania Department of Conservation and Natural Resources
- Website: Official website
- Pennsylvania State Parks

White Clay Creek Preserve is a 3,050-acre (1,230 ha) Pennsylvania state park along the valley of White Clay Creek in London Britain Township in Chester County, Pennsylvania in the United States. The park was donated by the DuPont Company in 1984 for the purpose of "preserving the diverse and unique plant and animal species, and the rich cultural heritage of the area". DuPont also donated an additional 528 acres (214 ha) for the adjoining White Clay Creek State Park to the state of Delaware. White Clay Creek Preserve is 3 miles (4.8 km) north of Newark, Delaware on Pennsylvania Route 896.

The preserve is supported by the Friends of White Clay Creek Preserve.

== History ==
=== Opasiskunk ===
The land on which White Clay Creek Preserve is located was originally sold to William Penn by Lenape Chief Kekelappen in 1683. Historians believe that Chief Kekelappen may have lived in Opasiskunk, an Indian town that was at the confluence of the east and middle branches of White Clay Creek. This town was quite large and covered several acres. Archeologists have found evidence that Opasiskunk was inhabited from the Archaic Period until the early 18th century.

=== Colonial times ===
There are several buildings from the early colonial era still standing in the vicinity of White Clay Creek Preserve. The Yeatman Mill House was once the hub of a prosperous milling and agriculture complex during the 18th and 19th centuries. The London Tract Baptist Meetinghouse was built in 1729. It is at the intersection of Sharpless and London Tract roads. Many of the area's earliest settlers are buried in the cemetery of the church.

=== Mason–Dixon Line ===
White Clay Creek Preserve borders the Mason–Dixon line and Twelve-Mile Circle at the Pennsylvania border with Delaware and Maryland. The line was established to end a protracted boundary dispute between the British colonies of Maryland and Pennsylvania, in 1750. Monuments marking points along the border line and arc can be seen at White Clay Creek Preserve along the Tri-State Trail.

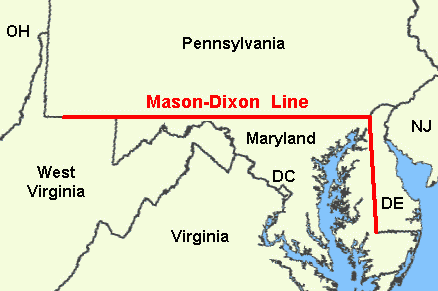
The original Mason–Dixon line

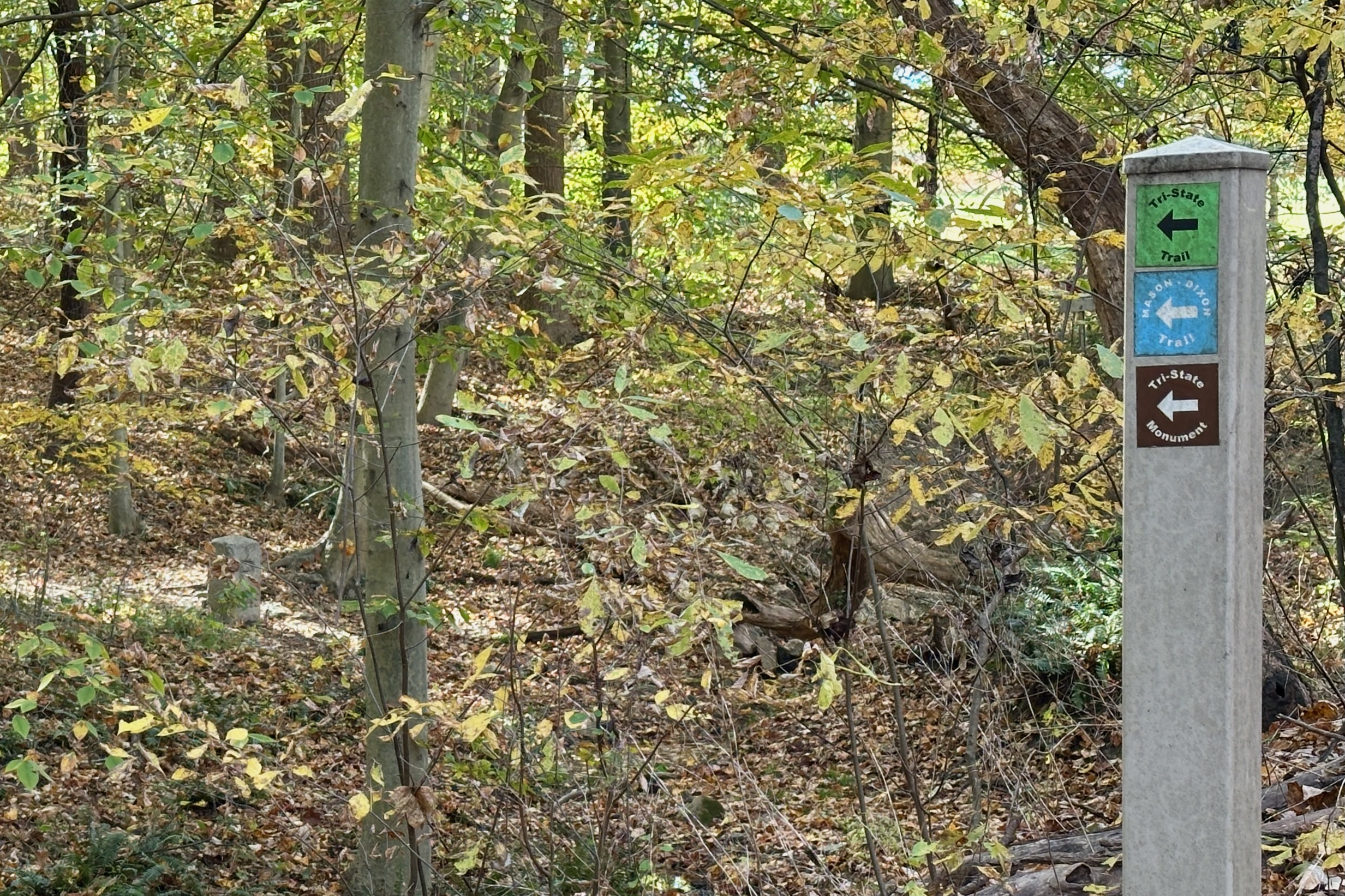
Trail at the Tri-State Monument

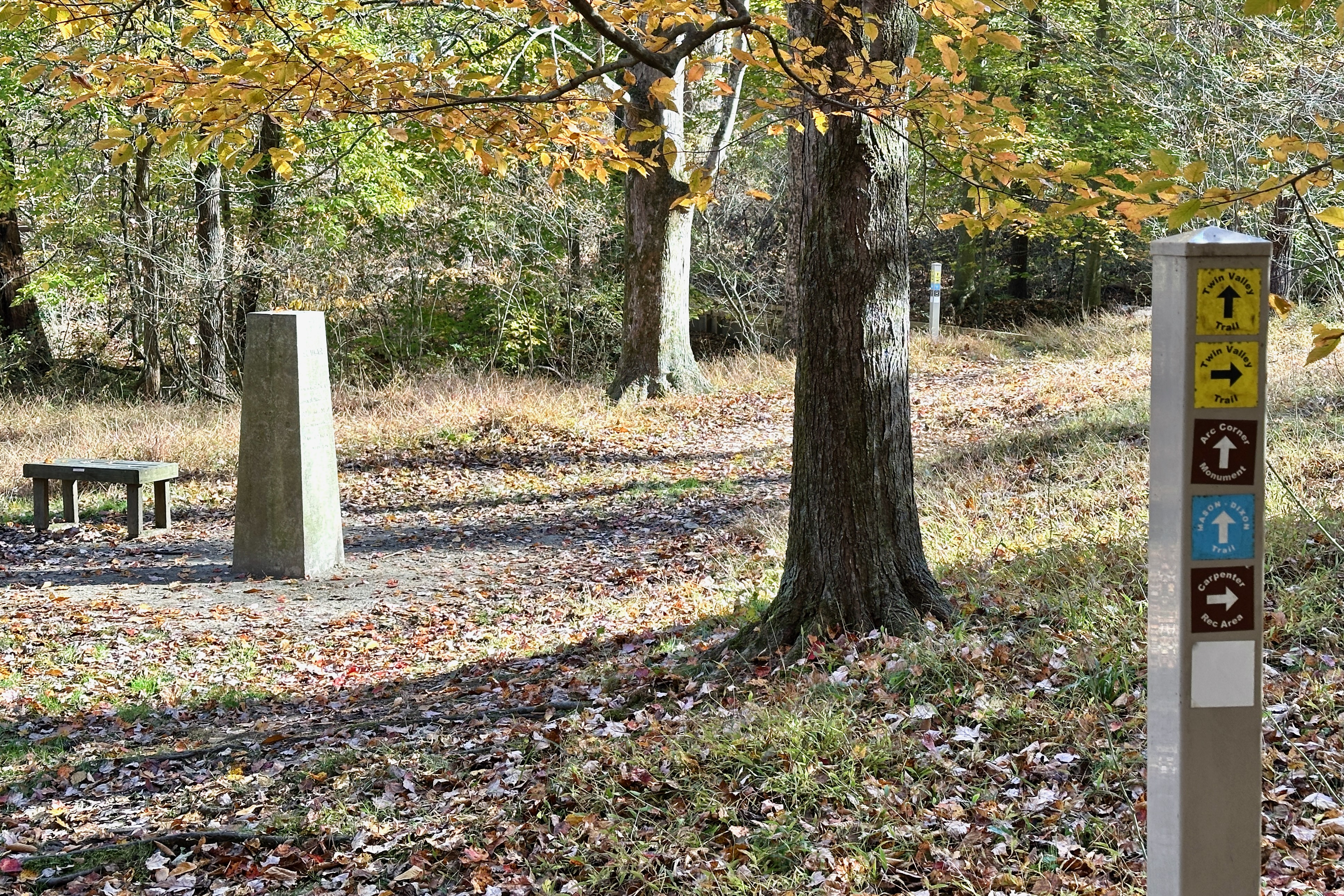
Trail at the Arc Corner Monument

== Recreation ==
White Clay Creek Preserve is the only state park in Pennsylvania designated as a preserve. This designation has kept development to a minimum.

- Hunting - The park is open to white-tailed deer hunting only, on about 1,220 acres (494 ha).
- Fishing - White Clay Creek is stocked with trout several times a year by the Pennsylvania Fish and Boat Commission. The middle branch and east branch of the creek are also open to fishing.
- Hiking - A 3 miles (4.8 km) hiking trail runs the length of the northern part of the park and connects with trails in White Clay Creek State Park in Delaware.
- Cycling - There are two trails, Peltier and New Peltier trails, that are designated for biking. Roads in and surrounding the park are also open to biking.
- Horseback riding - There is an 8 miles (13 km) trail for recreational horseback riding at White Clay Creek Preserve.
- Cross-country skiing - All trails and fields of the park are open to cross-country skiing during the winter months.

== Big Elk Creek Section ==
The trail map of the Preserve (revised as of Sept. 28, 2010) includes an insert showing a "Big Elk Creek Section," which lies a few miles west of the main area of the Preserve. The Section, covering about 739 acres of unbroken open space, was acquired by the Commonwealth of Pennsylvania on January 28, 2010, from property owned by George W. Strawbridge, Jr. It is managed by the staff of White Clay Creek Preserve and owned by the Pennsylvania Department of Conservation and Natural resources. A recent (i.e. 2013) webpage from Franklin County refers to this area as "Big Elk Preserve." Further acquisition of an additional 978 acres was finalized in 2020. The Big Elk Creek Section is bordered on the south by the boundary line with Maryland, and on the north by Strickersville Road, and lies in Elk Township, Chester County, Pennsylvania (west of Big Elk Creek) and Franklin Township, Chester County, Pennsylvania (east). The western and eastern borders of the Big Elk Creek Section run up against private properties, as do some portions near the southern edge of Strickersville Road. Although various trails run from the edge of the fields into the forests of the Big Elk Creek Section, the insert on the trail map for White Clay Creek Preserve as yet shows only elevation, main creeks, and roads, not trails, forests, or fields. A few forest trails, as well as fields and forests, are contiguous with those of Fair Hill Natural Resources Management Area, Maryland.

The Big Elk Creek Section has a free parking area off of Strickersville Road (east of Augustin Lane—latitude 39.730962, longitude -75.835785). The sign at this parking area reads thus:

"The acquisition of this land as a public site was made possible by The Conservation Fund with financial assistance from: Mt. Cuba Center, Inc., the Pennsylvania Department of Conservation and Natural Resources, Bureau of Recreation and Conservation, Growing Greener 2 Bond Fund, the Commonwealth of Pennsylvania Capital Project - DGS 192-41, Preservation Partnership Program, Commissioners of Chester County, Pennsylvania, Carol Aichele, Terence Farrell, Kathi Cozzone."
