= White Clay Creek State Park =

State park in Delaware, United States

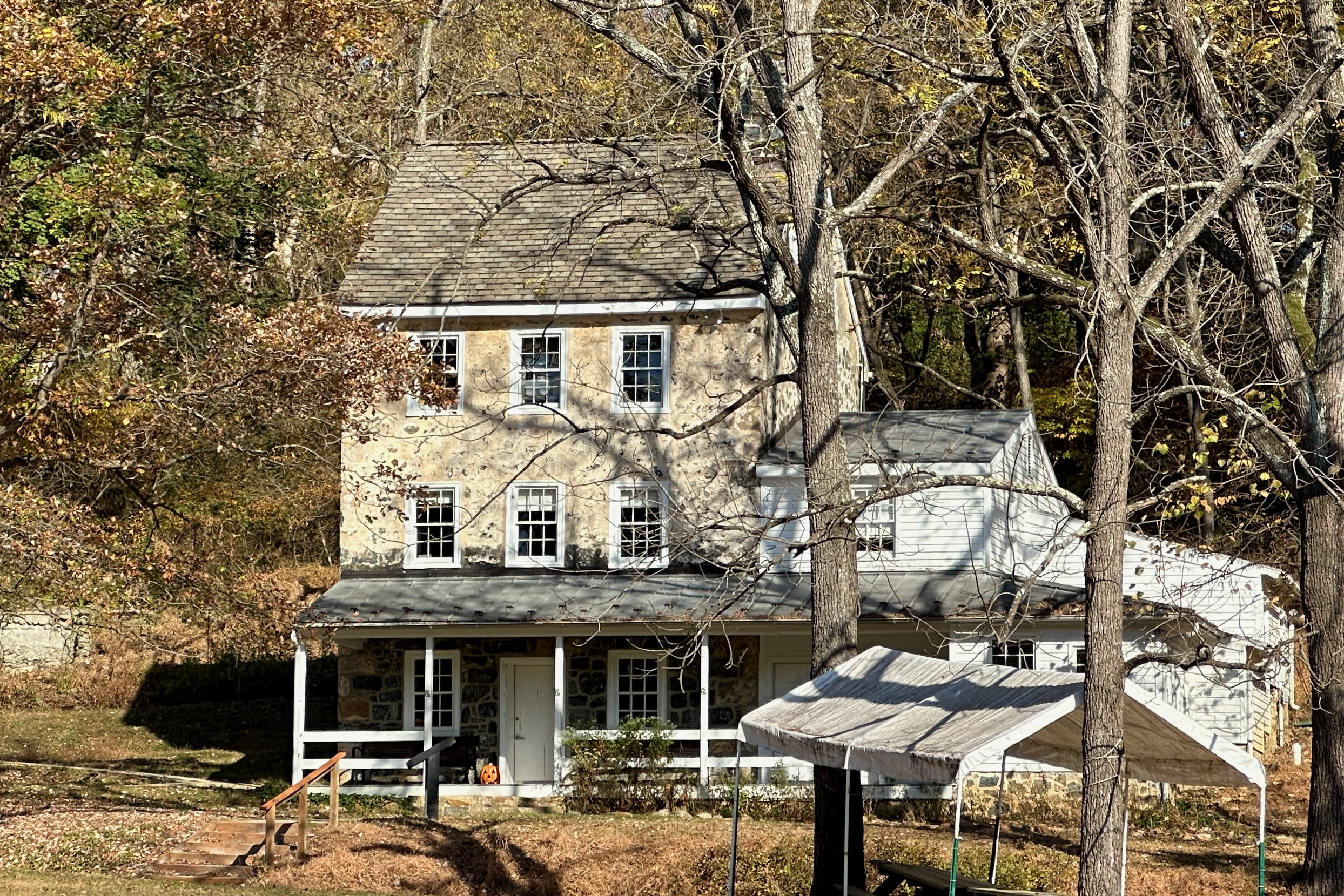
- Chambers House nature center in White Clay Creek State Park

- Location within Delaware Location within the United States
- Location: New Castle County, Delaware, United States
- Coordinates: 39°44′10″N 75°45′44″W
- Area: 3,559.31 acres (1,440.40 ha)
- Elevation: 108 ft (33 m)
- Established: 1968
- Administrator: Delaware Department of Natural Resources and Environmental Control
- Website: Official website

White Clay Creek State Park is a state park in the U.S. state of Delaware along White Clay Creek in New Castle County, near Newark. North of the park is Pennsylvania's White Clay Creek Preserve; the two were originally operated as bi-state parks to jointly protect the creek. White Clay Creek is federally protected as part of the National Park Service's National Wild and Scenic Rivers System.

The 3,559-acre (1,440 ha) White Clay Creek State Park offers 40 miles (64 km) of nature and fitness trails which are open to hiking and mountain biking. The park also preserves a number of historic structures and operates a nature center.

== History ==
After World War II, concerns over potential future water shortages in northern Delaware led to proposals to dam the White Clay Creek and flood the surrounding valley to create a reservoir. The Pennsylvania Railroad began purchasing land near the creek toward that end.

In 1956, DuPont purchased the Pennsylvania Railroad Company land and began acquiring additional land in the valley to prevent further residential development. By the early 1960s, the dam proposal had begun moving forward, generating strong community opposition in both states. The opposition was led by local citizens and groups such as the United Automobile Workers union and the Sierra Club, who were concerned about the environmental impact as well as the loss of scenic and recreational open space. The non-profit White Clay Watershed Association was formed in 1965, with the aim of building opposition to the dam.

White Clay Creek State Park was established in 1968 as a small recreational park. Encouraged by conservationists throughout the early 1970s, the state purchased over 150 acres (61 ha) of additional adjoining tracts of land to expand the park and protect more land, and in 1975 the park was renamed as Walter S. Carpenter Jr. State Park in honor of DuPont's former president and chairman. By the mid-1970s, support for the dam had diminished.

With the dam proposal moribund, the National Park Service encouraged DuPont to donate the land to Delaware and Pennsylvania to form joint park. Delaware Senator Joe Biden negotiated with DuPont and the states to facilitate the donation. DuPont donated 1,234 acres to Pennsylvania and 528 acres to Delaware to form the bi-state White Clay Creek Preserve.

In 1988, the heirs of S. Hallock du Pont announced they were planning to sell off 850 of the estate's 2,000 acres, which had been held in trust for future generations. Seeking to limit the loss of open space, Governor Michael Castle began the purchase of 321 acres of the land which would connect Walter Carpenter State Park and the White Clay Creek Preserve to the Middle Run Valley Natural Area, a county-run park. In signing the agreement, Castle stated, "This is clearly more than just the land bridge we have been talking about. This means this section of northern Delaware will be protected against overdevelopment." The purchase was completed in the early 1990s, and in 1995, Walter S. Carpenter Jr. State Park, the Delaware portion of the White Clay Creek Preserve, and the du Pont estate lands were joined together and renamed White Clay Creek State Park.

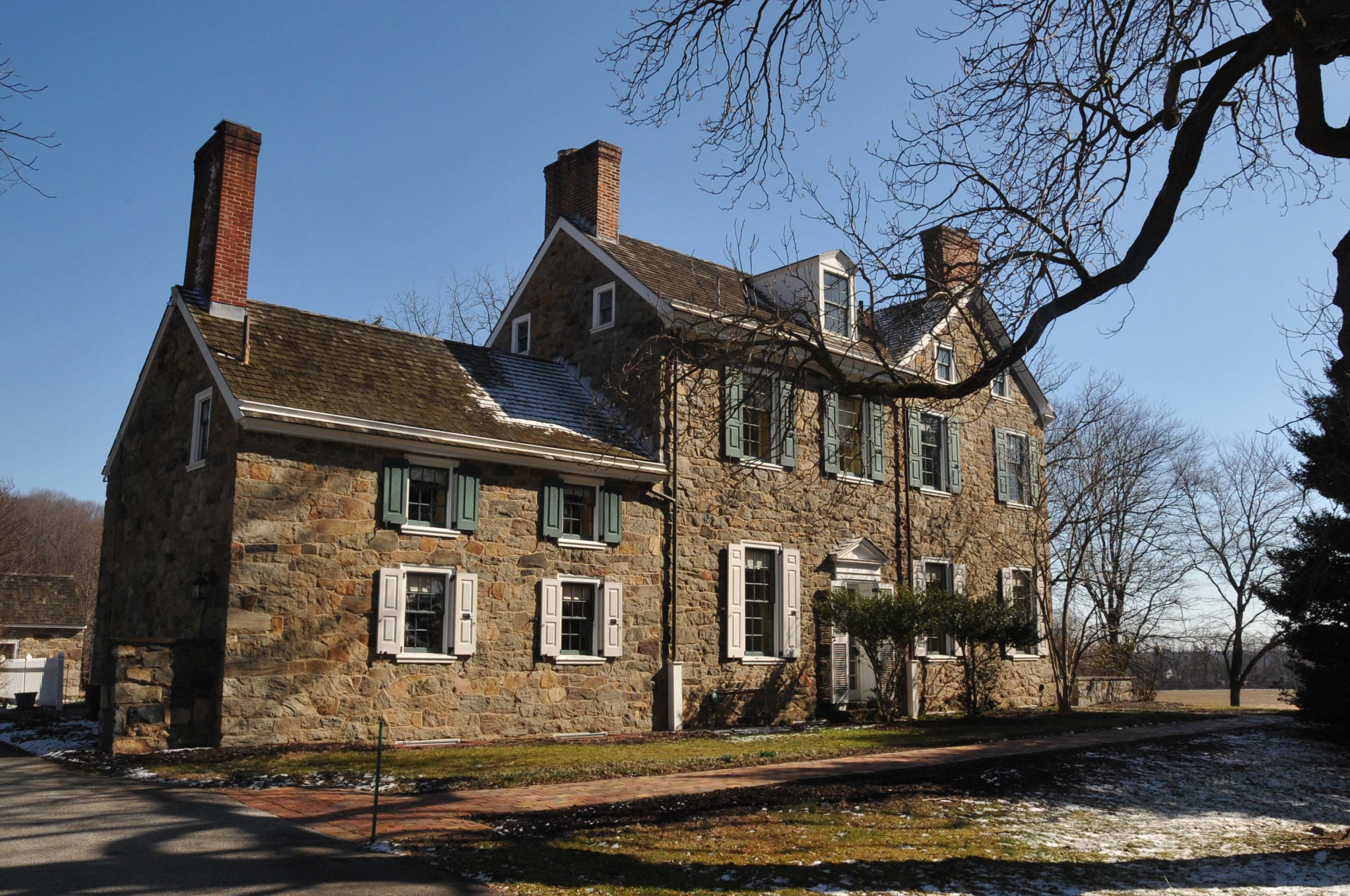
Judge Morris house

In 1998, the state purchased an additional 500 acres of land in the form of the Judge Hugh M. Morris Estate, bordering the Middle Run Valley Natural Area. The purchase brought the park's total size to over 3,000 acres.

In 2000, Congress included the White Clay Creek in the National Park Service's National Wild and Scenic River program. This was the first instance of an entire watershed being so designated as opposed to portions of a river. The designation increases the level of protection on the lands in the valley.

== Mason–Dixon Line ==
Portions of the Mason–Dixon line run through White Clay Creek State Park and the park preserves several historic resources associated with the line. The starting point of the survey, called the "post mark'd west," is located on Bryan's Field within the park. Charles Mason wrote that, "...the point 15 miles South of the Southernmost Point of the City of Philadelphia is situated in Mill Creek Hundred in the County of Newcastle, in a Plantation belonging to Mr. Alexander Bryan." The spot is marked by a monument donated by S. Hallock du Pont in 1952 and can be found along the Bryan's Field trail. The Arc Corner surveyed by Mason and Dixon is also within the park and is marked by a monument erected in 1892. The Tri-State Trail connects White Clay Creek State Park to the 1849 Tri-State Monument, where the borders of Delaware, Pennsylvania, and Maryland meet. The Mason-Dixon Trail enters the park along a trail from the White Clay Creek Preserve and passes through the preserve on its way towards Newark.

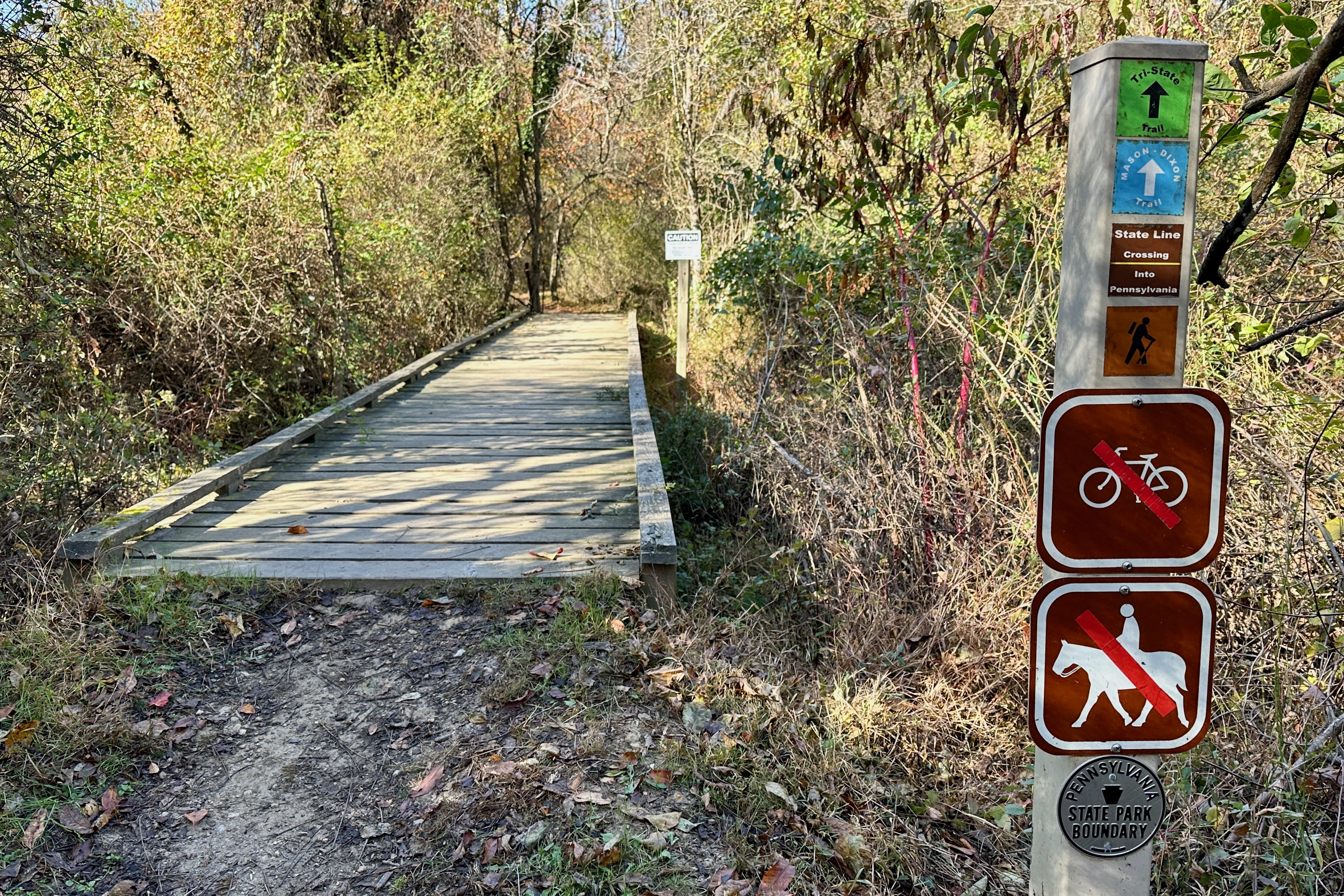
Trail entering Pennsylvania from the park

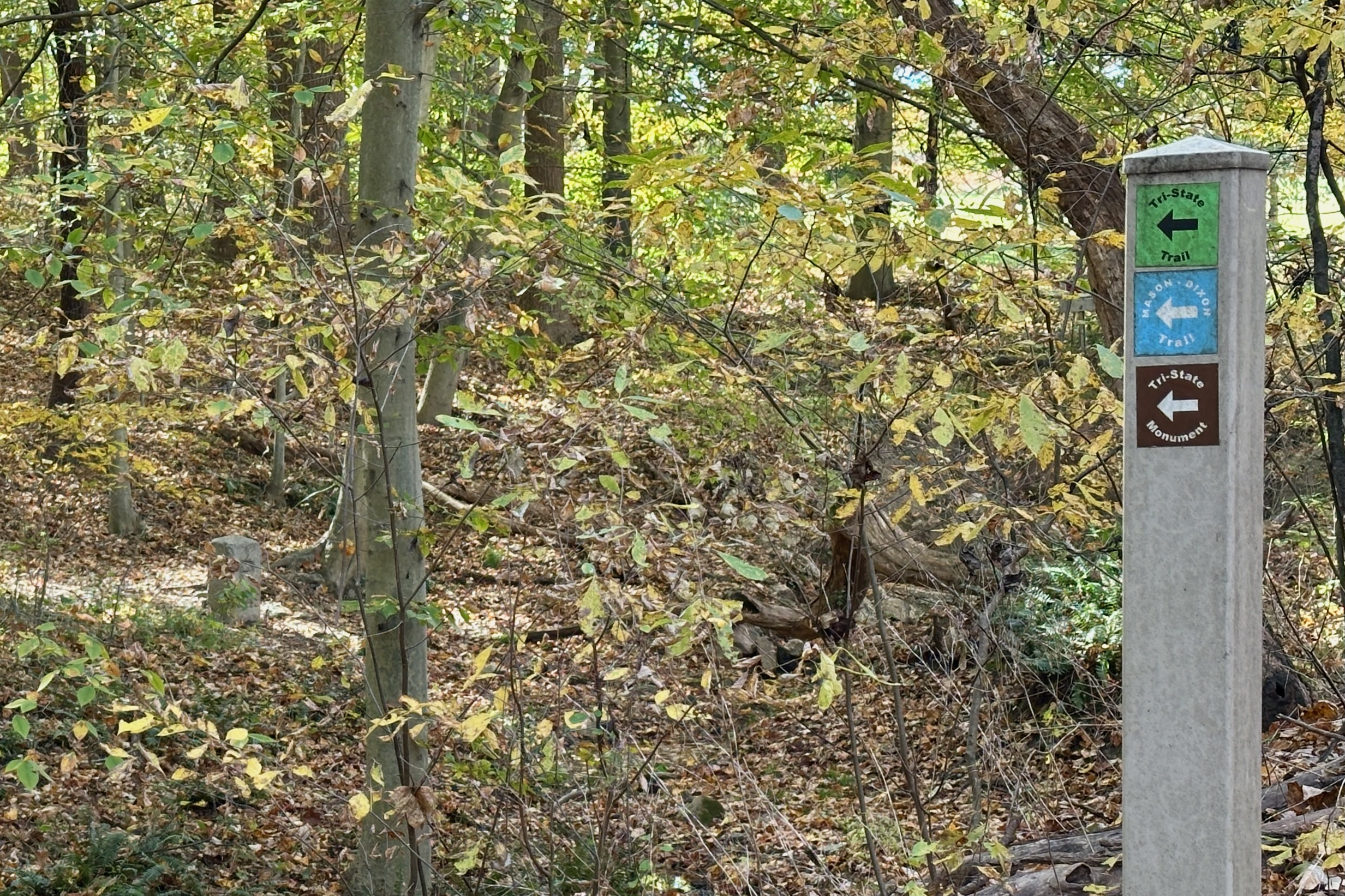
Trail at the Tri-State Monument

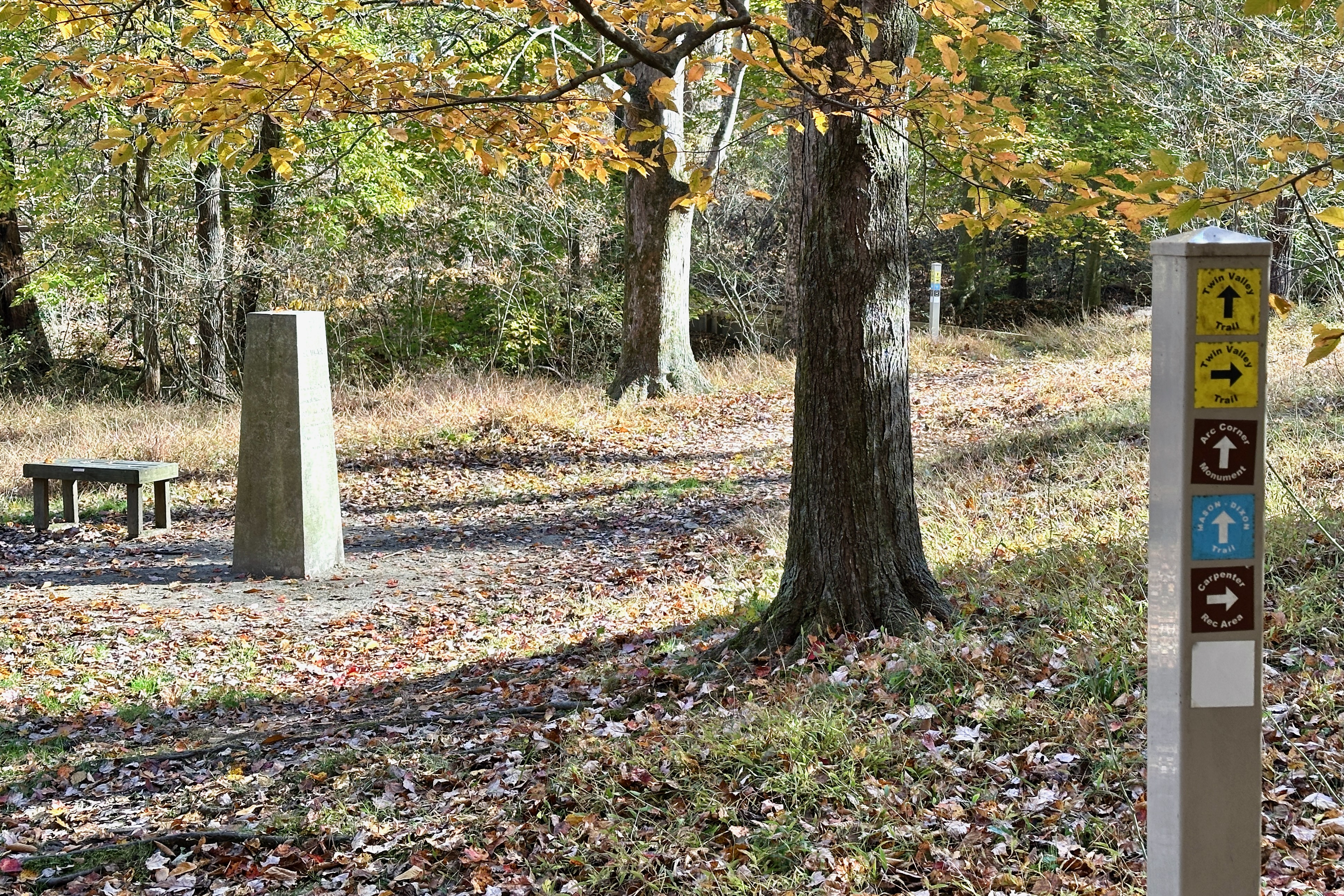
Trail at the Arc Corner Monument

== Ecology ==
The park is part of the Northeastern coastal forests ecoregion.
