= Penn–Calvert boundary dispute =

Long-running legal conflict

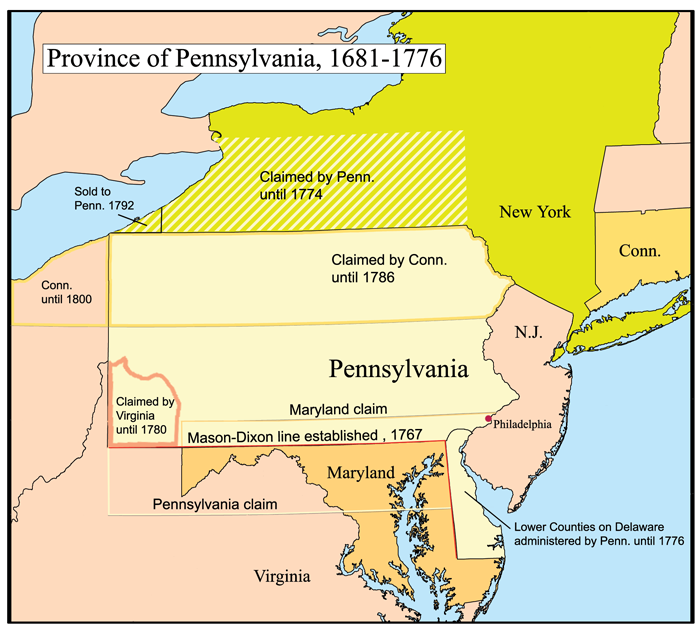
Map of the Province of Pennsylvania and surrounding colonies; the overlapping Pennsylvania and Maryland land claims can be seen to the south, with the conflict-resolving Mason–Dixon line running through their center.

The Penn–Calvert boundary dispute (also known as Penn vs. Baltimore) was a long-running legal conflict between William Penn and his heirs on one side, and Charles Calvert, 3rd Baron Baltimore and his heirs on the other side. The overlapping nature of their charters of land in Colonial America required numerous attempts at mediation, surveying, and intervention by the king and courts of England to ultimately be resolved. Subsequent questions over these charters have also been adjudicated by American arbitrators and the Supreme Court of the United States. The boundary dispute shaped the eventual borders of five U.S. states: Pennsylvania, Maryland, Delaware, New Jersey, and West Virginia.

== Background ==
In 1629, Samuel Godin and Samuel Blommaert sent agents of the Dutch West India Company to negotiate with the local Nanticoke tribe to purchase land on Cape Henlopen near present-day Lewes, Delaware. With the support of New Netherland's colonial leadership at New Amsterdam, a new colony named Zwaanendael was established on the purchased land in 1631 by David Pietersz de Vries. The colony proved to be very short-lived, as conflicts with the Nanticoke led to it being wiped out within a year. A second attempt at establishing a colony at that location in 1632 was soon abandoned.

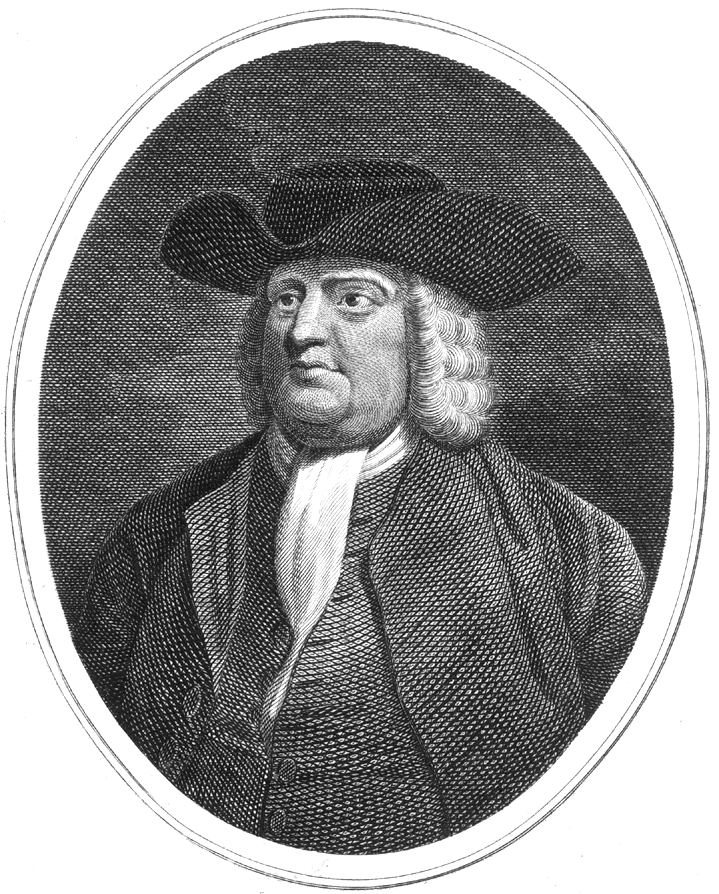
William Penn, Proprietor of Pennsylvania

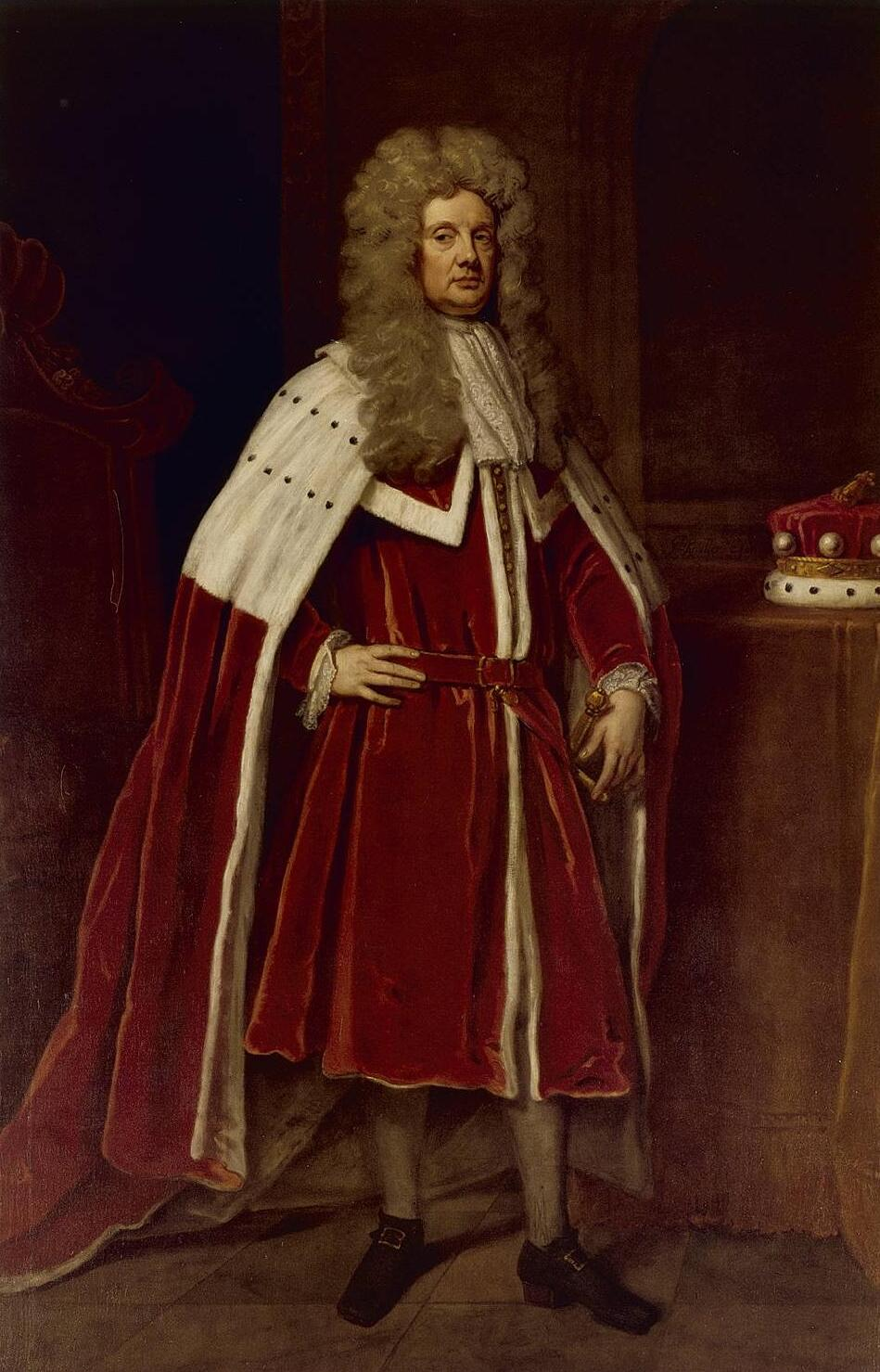
Charles Calvert, 3rd Baron Baltimore, Proprietor of Maryland

On June 20, 1632, King Charles I granted Cecil Calvert, 2nd Baron Baltimore a charter for land along the Chesapeake Bay. The northern boundary of the charter was the 40th parallel, and the eastern boundary was the Delaware Bay and the Atlantic Ocean. However, the charter only granted the Calverts the right to "uncultivated" lands. The colonists arrived in Maryland in 1634, but made no attempts at surveying the northern border or colonizing the area along the Delaware Bay.

The colony of New Sweden was established north of the Delaware Bay, at Fort Christina near present-day Wilmington, Delaware, in 1638. Viewing this as an incursion into their territory, the Dutch in 1651 established a new outpost, Fort Casimir at present-day New Castle, Delaware, south of Fort Christina. The Swedes conquered Fort Casimir in 1654, but Peter Stuyvesant, the Director-General of New Netherland, retaliated and in 1655, he both took back Fort Casmir and conquered Fort Christina. Stuyvesant renamed Fort Casimir as New Amstel, and placed a deputy there to oversee the entire region, reporting back to Stuyvesant at New Amsterdam.

The English objected to the colonization attempts of both Sweden and the Netherlands and Maryland sent a delegate to New Amstel in 1659 protesting their presence on land granted to Lord Baltimore. However, it was not until 1664 when the English would formally act against their colonial rivals. That year King Charles II granted his brother James, the Duke of York, all the land between the Connecticut and Delaware Rivers. Fort Amsterdam was captured on September 8, 1664, and Stuyvesant formally surrendered the territories of New Netherland the next day. The colonial outposts along the Delaware Bay surrendered as well soon after, and New Amstel was renamed New Castle by the English—though it was still governed by a deputy reporting to New Amsterdam, now named New York after the Duke, even though the Duke had not received a charter from the king for these lands.

In 1681, William Penn was granted a charter for Pennsylvania by Charles II. Lord Baltimore (now Cecil's son, Charles Calvert) did not object to the grant, as long as Penn's land was north of Maryland's northern border, the 40th parallel. In addition, James was allowed to retain the lands around New Castle that he had won through conquest, as Charles carved out a Twelve-Mile Circle around New Castle. Penn, who desired ocean access for his colony, convinced James to lease these lands to him as well, and so in August 1682, the Duke of York granted Penn the Twelve Mile Circle around New Castle as well as the lands south, to Cape Henlopen. Though James had deeded these lands to Penn, James himself did not formally receive a charter to the Delaware lands until March 22, 1683.

Penn sailed to the colonies and, in May 1683, he met with Calvert in New Castle. The two men disagreed on how the boundaries should be determined, including where the southern boundary of Pennsylvania should be and how the size of the Twelve Mile Circle should be judged. This meeting marked the beginning of the long legal dispute.

== History of the boundary dispute ==
Penn wanted his new colony to have access to the Chesapeake Bay, while Calvert was adamant that the 40th parallel should serve as the southernmost border of Pennsylvania and he insisted the lands on the Delaware Bay were included in the original 1632 charter for Maryland. Because the two could not agree, Penn decided to go to court. Both Penn and Calvert returned to England to participate in the case. By this time, the Duke of York had ascended to the throne as James II. Penn thought his chances in court were good, as he and James were friends and allies. He invoked the Zwaanendael Colony in making his case: the Maryland charter was only for "uncultivated" lands, but the Dutch had cultivated the area near the Delaware Bay by founding a colony that predated the charter. This argument had also been made by the Dutch themselves when Maryland protested the colony in 1659. This proved to be the decisive point.

The Committee for Trade and Plantations agreed that Baltimore's charter was only for uncultivated land, and the presence of Christians in the disputed territory prior to, and after, his settlement of the region meant it could not be his. On November 7, 1685, James issued a decision which called for a compromise. He ordered that the land between the Chesapeake and Delaware Bays be divided in half, with a line west from Cape Henlopen intersecting with a line drawn south from the 40th parallel. James kept the northern border of Maryland at the 40th parallel. Calvert still did not have the border surveyed, however. In December, 1688, King James gave Penn a new and more defined charter for the Delaware holdings.

On July 20, 1701, the people of the Lower Counties in present-day Delaware petitioned Penn for a separate legislature and administrative officers from Pennsylvania's. Penn granted the request on August 28, and he commissioned a survey of the Twelve Mile Circle to determine the formal boundaries between Pennsylvania and the Lower Counties. Isaac Taylor of Pennsylvania and Thomas Piersons of New Castle were selected as the surveyors. They began their survey at a dyke in New Castle in September 1701, and ended their survey of the boundary arc in October. There were a number of errors in their survey. This was the first formal attempt to determine the boundaries created by the Twelve-Mile Circle, but far from the last.

Charles Calvert petitioned Queen Anne in 1709 to dismiss the portions of the 1683 ruling which had granted Penn land below the 40th parallel. Penn opposed Calvert's petition, and on June 23, 1710, the queen dismissed it. After the queen's ruling, both the Pennsylvania and Delaware assemblies accepted the Taylor-Piersons boundaries. This did not resolve the issue of border disputes on the ground. There were continued instances of the Maryland government granting land to Marylanders within the Delaware borders, and clashes between sheriffs in the two territories over appropriate jurisdiction. Further, the Delaware Assembly repealed its approval of the circular boundaries just one year after approving them.

Charles Calvert, the 3rd Lord Baltimore, died in 1715, and William Penn died in 1718. Benedict Calvert, 4th Baron Baltimore died just two months after his father, so the boundary dispute was carried forth by Charles Calvert, 5th Baron Baltimore on Maryland's side, and by Penn's children John, Thomas, and Richard on the Pennsylvania side.

=== The 1732 Agreement ===
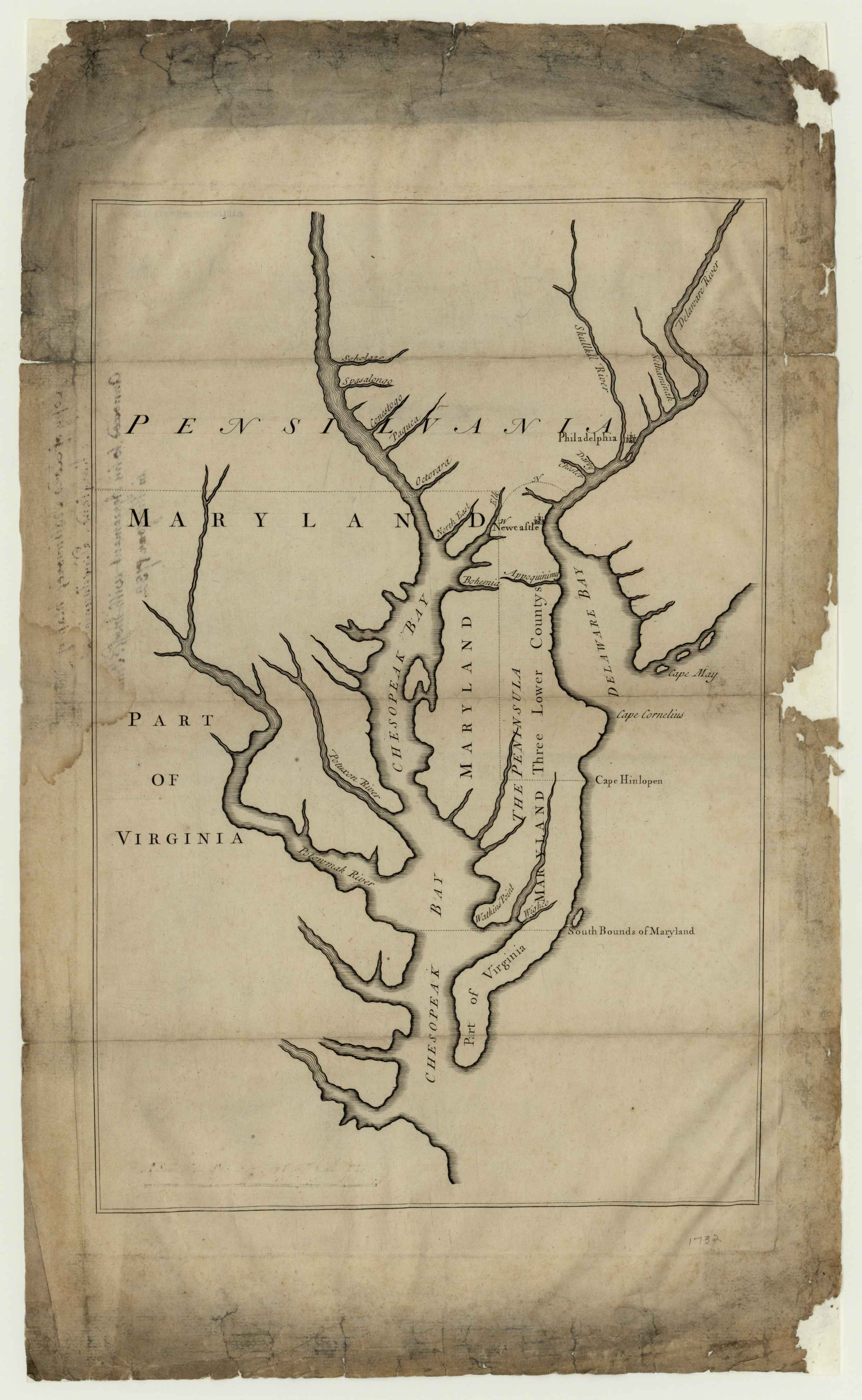
1732 map of Maryland

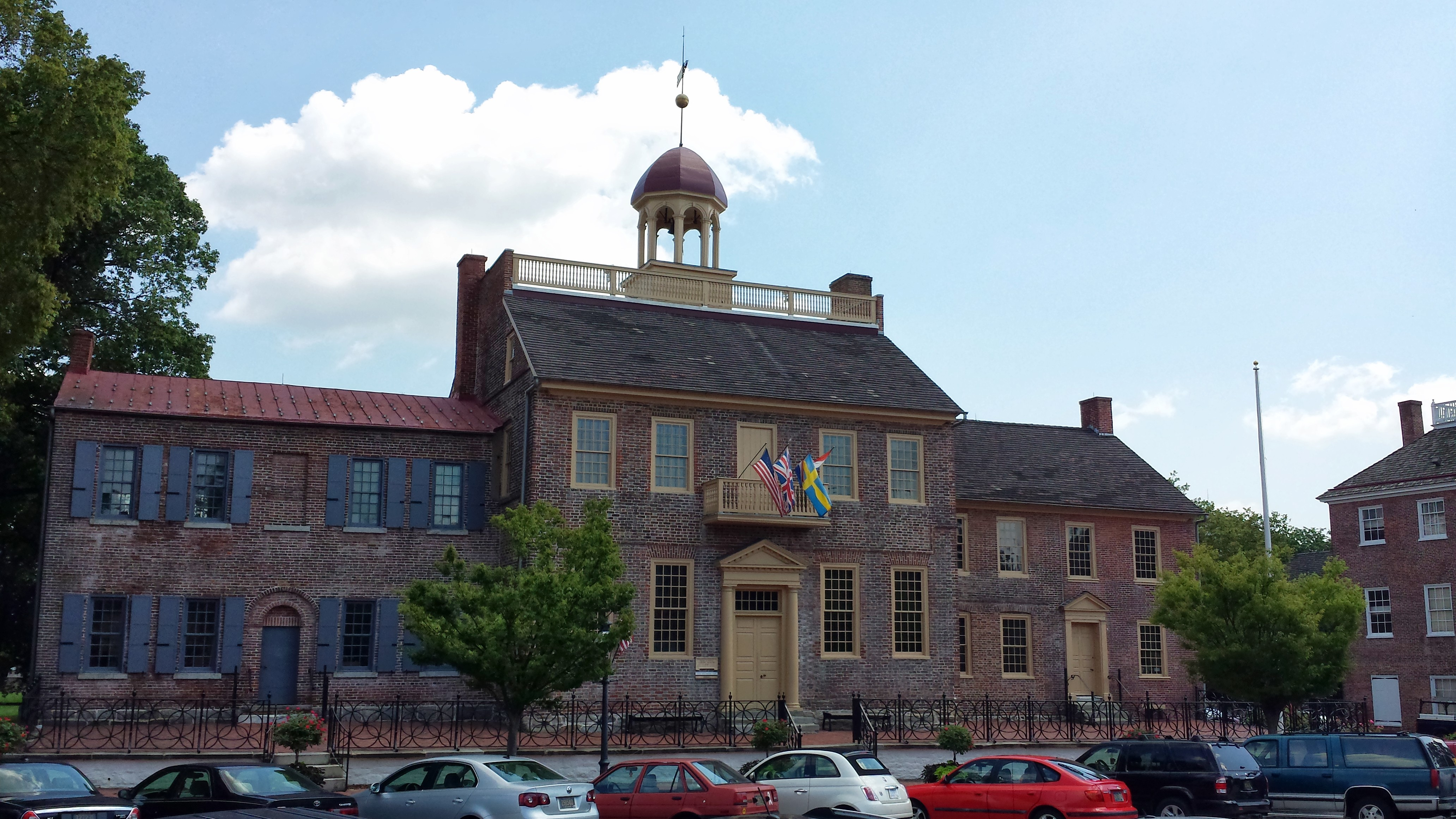
The cupola of the New Castle Court House was used as the center of the Twelve Mile Circle; the boundary Commissions met here numerous times over the years.

The discovery that the Twelve Mile Circle did not actually intersect with the 40th parallel, and that the parallel was actually north of Philadelphia, Pennsylvania's major city, precipitated further disputes over the border. Each side attempted to surreptitiously conduct one-sided surveys of the borders. In 1722, Calvert complained to the Maryland Council that the Chief Justice of Cecil County had been arrested by Pennsylvania for "running out some lines" in the forest; Maryland, in turn, arrested Isaac Taylor, the surveyor who had earlier worked on the circle, for an incursion into Maryland territory. Conflicts between settlers such as Cresap's War and questions surrounding to which proprietor they owed taxes prompted both sides to desire a settlement. In 1731, Calvert petitioned King George II to force the Penns to agree to a formal demarcation of the boundaries. The matter was referred to the Committee for Trade and Plantations once more. Calvert insisted the boundary should remain the 40th parallel, while the Penns argued it should be placed 20 miles south of Philadelphia.

The King and Committee convinced the two sides to come to another compromise. On May 10, 1732, Calvert and the Penns signed an Article of Agreement which reaffirmed much of the 1685 ruling, but adjusted Pennsylvania's southern boundary below the 40th parallel. The agreement stated that the peninsula would be divided by a line running west from Cape Henlopen to the middle of the peninsula, and from that middle point a line would be drawn north to a point tangent to the Twelve Mile Circle. From the tangent point, a line would be drawn along the circle until it was due north of the tangent point, at which point it would go due north again until it was intersected by an east-west line which would be placed 15 miles south of Philadelphia. The map included in the agreement, however, incorrectly labeled Fenwick Island, Delaware as Cape Henlopen. That point was 19 miles south of the actual Cape Henlopen.

The Articles of Agreement also created a new Commission to oversee the implementation of the boundary agreement and the placing of monuments to formally mark the borders. Each party appointed 7 members to the Commission, which was to be led by the governors of the two colonies. The Pennsylvania Commissioners included Governor Patrick Gordon, Isaac Norris, Samuel Preston, James Logan, and Andrew Hamilton. The Maryland Commissioners included Governor Samuel Ogle, former Governor Charles Calvert, and Benjamin Tasker, Sr.

The Commission held its first meeting in Chestertown, Maryland. They subsequently met four times at New Castle's Court House, once in Joppa, Maryland, and once in Philadelphia. The Commission could not agree on several points of contention related to the Twelve Mile Circle. First, the Maryland Commissioners insisted that a circle must have a center point and they were not empowered to determine what the center point was. Second, the Maryland Commissioners insisted the circle should have a circumference of 12 miles, while the Pennsylvania Commissioners insisted it should have a radius of 12 miles. Lord Baltimore had also discovered the mapping error that resulted in Fenwick Island being used as the southernmost boundary point in the Articles of Agreement, rather than Cape Henlopen, and he protested this.

Despite being empowered to resolve the conflict, the Commissioners ultimately signed a statement saying they could not come to an accord. Following this failure, Lord Baltimore filed a new petition in the English courts, and the Penns filed a counter-petition. King George II issued a decree on May 4, 1738 barring either proprietor from making any land grants in the disputed territory, and creating temporary boundary lines.

=== The Court of Chancery suit ===
After filing their petitions in court, both sides and their agents began compiling witness depositions in Philadelphia, New Castle, and throughout Maryland. The petitions filed by Calvert and the Penns were finally addressed by the English Court of Chancery in 1750. After reviewing the colonial deeds, the agreements made by the various parties over the decades, and after hearing testimony from both sides, on May 15, 1750, Philip Yorke, 1st Earl of Hardwicke, the Lord Chancellor, ruled that the Agreement of 1732 should be binding. He ordered the appointment of new Commissioners to oversee the drawing of the boundaries. He also resolved the questions that had stopped the first round of Commissioners, determining that the center of the circle would be the center of New Castle, the circle would have a 12-mile radius, and Fenwick Island (rather than Cape Henlopen) would be used as the southern boundary as agreed upon in the 1732 agreement.

The decision in the case is reported under Penn v Lord Baltimore (1750) 1 Ves Sen 444, and has become an important judicial precedent in its own right, forming a judicial exception to the Moçambique rule. Professor Adrian Briggs of Oxford University has asserted that the judicial precedent is sufficiently important that there should be a similar eponymous rule referring to the case itself.

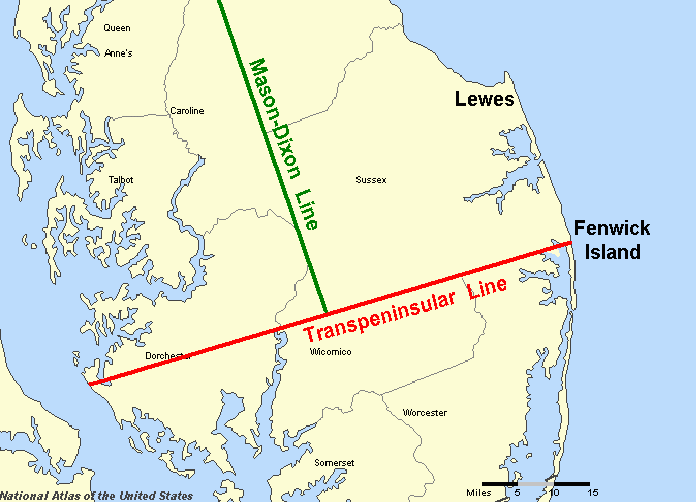
The Transpeninsular Line, the southernmost disputed boundary

The new Commission included William Allen, Benjamin Chew, Thomas Hopkinson, Rev. Richard Peters, Ryves Holt, and Tench Francis, Sr. from Pennsylvania and Delaware, and Benedict Calvert, Benjamin Tasker, Jr., George Plater, and Daniel Dulaney Sr. from Maryland. They held their first meeting in the Assembly Room of the New Castle Court House on November 14, 1750. The Commissioners proposed that the Court House should be considered the "center" of New Castle and so the 12 Mile Circle should be based around the cupola at the top of the building.

The Commissioners then hired a survey team (consisting of John Lukens and Archibald McClean from Pennsylvania, and John Riggs and Thomas Garnett from Maryland) to map the line dividing the northern half of the peninsula from the southern half, by going from Fenwick Island west. This survey was named the Transpeninsular Line. The first Transpeninsular Monument was placed at the easternmost point. The team completed the survey by June 1751.

However, the Commissioners, meeting in New Castle in October, could not agree if the westernmost point of the line should be the Chesapeake Bay or Slaughter Creek. Since the middle point could not be determined without agreement on the western point, the survey could not be completed. They also disagreed if the measurements for the Twelve Mile Circle should be taken on the ground, which would incorporate hills and valleys (thus making the circle smaller and giving more land to Calvert), or if they should be measured in a straight level (making the radius a full twelve miles and giving more land to the Penns). The Commissioners referred the issues to Lord Hardwicke. Hardwicke ruled that the western point of the Transpeninsular Line should be the Chesapeake Bay. He also approved of the use of the New Castle Court House as the center of the Twelve Mile Circle and determined that the twelve miles should be measured on a level line.

=== Resolution ===
In 1751, Charles Calvert died. His son, Frederick Calvert, 6th Baron Baltimore, did not wish to be bound by any agreements his father had made. This froze the resolution of the boundary dispute again, and surveying efforts came to a halt. But by 1760, Calvert relented, and he entered into an agreement on July 4 which matched the 1732 agreement and the Chancellor's Decree of 1750. In November of that year, the Commissioners met in New Castle, agreed to the Transpeninsular Survey results, and placed the Middle Point marker. The southernmost boundary was finally completed.

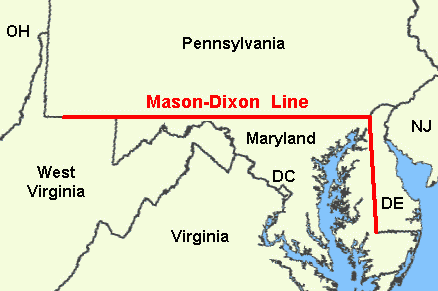
The Mason–Dixon line

In 1761, the colonial surveyors made an attempt at surveying the Twelve mile circle by laying a chain in a line from the Court House's cupola, but they were unsuccessful due their tools and bad calculations. They tried again in 1763, but the line was still off. The two parties agreed to replace the colonial surveyors with a team from England. A contract between the Penns, Baltimore, and Charles Mason and Jeremiah Dixon was signed on July 20, 1763. Mason and Dixon arrived in Philadelphia on November 15, 1763, where they met with the boundary Commissioners.

Mason and Dixon's first task was to determine the southernmost point of Philadelphia, where they built an observatory. They then proceeded 31 miles west where they set up their headquarters for the project on the Harlan Farm in Embreeville and erected a stone as a reference point. The stone is known now as the Star Gazers' Stone. After doing additional observation and surveying work, they established the east-west boundary line between Pennsylvania and Maryland. In August 1764, they ran a line from the New Castle Court House to determine the correct tangent point. From September 4–25, they surveyed the north-south line down to the Middle Point Marker.

In November, Mason and Dixon met with the Commissioners in Christiana, Delaware and the Commissioners approved their results. From December 17, 1765 – January 1, 1766, they placed monument stones under the supervision of one commissioner from each colony. In 1767, they mapped the western line as far as possible before turning back. The surveyors presented their finalized boundaries to the Commissioners at Christiana in November, 1767. They departed America on September 11, 1768.

Baltimore and the Penns petitioned King George III for approval of the Mason-Dixon boundaries on August 20, 1768. King George approved the boundaries on January 11, 1769—over eighty-five years after the beginning of the dispute. Both proprietary families subsequently lost their colonies in the American Revolution, just seven years later.

== Subsequent disputes ==
Though the legal dispute between the Penns and the Calverts ended when the king signed off on their agreed upon boundaries, and when they later lost their proprietary rights to the colonies, there have been numerous additional legal disagreements over the borders and surveying attempts. In 1820, New Jersey disputed Delaware's right to cede Pea Patch Island to the United States government since the island was primarily on the New Jersey side of the river. Secretary of War John C. Calhoun requested a legal opinion from Attorney General William Wirt, who in turn consulted with George Read, Jr. and former Attorney General Caesar A. Rodney. The two wrote a report detailing the history of the colonial deeds and the long-running struggle between the Penns and Calverts in the courts, and stated that the colonial deeds entitled Delaware to the entirety of the Delaware River within the boundaries of the Twelve-Mile Circle. After conflicting opinions from two different circuit courts on the issue, President James K. Polk intervened in 1847 and suggested an arbitrator resolve the disagreement. John Sergeant was appointed arbitrator, and in Independence Hall heard arguments from the United States (represented by Senators John M. Clayton and James A. Bayard Jr.) and a citizen of New Jersey (represented by former Secretary of War John Eaton and former Secretary of the Treasury George M. Bibb) regarding that same history of colonial deeds. Sergeant's ruling relied in part on Hardwicke's decision in Penn v. Baltimore.

New Jersey contested the circle's borders again in 1872, when Delaware arrested several New Jersey fishermen and New Jersey claimed ownership of the Delaware River up to the middle point. The issue has been adjudicated by the United States Supreme Court several times (primarily in 1877, 1934, and 2007) in cases named New Jersey v. Delaware. The extensive history of the circle and border dispute were documented by Justice Benjamin N. Cardozo in the 1934 case, where he cited the decisions by both Lord Chancellor Hardwicke and the arbitrator Sergeant.

== Legal precedent ==
As one of the earliest attempts by the courts to adjudicate boundary disputes between colonies or states in America, Penn v. Baltimore has also been relied upon as precedent for numerous other cases involving American boundary disputes, particularly Hardwicke's assertion that "long possession and enjoyment... is one of the best evidence of title to lands or districts of lands in America." The Supreme Court cited Lord Chancellor Hardwicke's legal reasoning in State of Rhode Island v. Commonwealth of Massachusetts, 37 U.S. 657 (1838), Commonwealth of Virginia v. State of Tennessee, 148 U.S. 503 (1893), State of Virginia v. State of West Virginia, 78 U.S. 39 (1870), State of Missouri v. State of Illinois, 180 U.S. 208 (1900), and State of Maryland v. State of West Virginia, 217 U.S. 1 (1910), amongst others. New York Attorney General Josiah Ogden Hoffman invoked Penn v. Baltimore in the case of New York v. Connecticut, 4 U.S. 1 (1799), which was the first case heard by the Supreme Court under its original jurisdiction authority to resolve disputes between states. In the case of Hans v. Louisiana, 134 US 1 (1890), the Court noted that while some types of lawsuits were not contemplated by the framers of the Constitution, Penn v. Baltimore "shows that some of these unusual subjects of litigation were not unknown to the courts even in colonial times."

In his opinion, Hardwicke also established the legal concept that equity judgments can be made in personam (in a court having jurisdiction over a specific person). When Lord Baltimore objected to the Court's jurisdiction over foreign soil or royal colonies, Hardwicke dismissed the objection and determined that he could indeed act since he was ruling upon a contractual agreement made in England (the 1732 Agreement), and both parties to the agreement were present before the Court and subject to its powers of contempt and sequestration. The Supreme Court has cited this view in cases such as Pennoyer v. Neff, 95 U.S. 714 (1878).

== See also ==
- Twelve-Mile Circle
- New Castle Court House Museum
- Transpeninsular Line
- Mason–Dixon line
- Fenwick Island Lighthouse
- Delaware Boundary Markers
- Mason and Dixon Survey Terminal Point
- Star Gazers' Stone
