= Mechanicsville, Pennsylvania =

Mechanicsville is the name of places in the U.S. state of Pennsylvania:

- Mechanicsville, Bucks County, Pennsylvania
- Mechanicsville, Lancaster County, Pennsylvania
- Mechanicsville, Lehigh County, Pennsylvania
- Mechanicsville, Montour County, Pennsylvania
- Mechanicsville, Schuylkill County, Pennsylvania

== See also ==
- Mechanicsville, Delaware, formerly claimed by both Pennsylvania and Delaware
