= Mechanicsburg =

Mechanicsburg may refer to:

== Places ==
In the United States:

- Mechanicsburg, Illinois
- Mechanicsburg Township, Sangamon County, Illinois
- Mechanicsburg, Boone County, Indiana
- Mechanicsburg, Henry County, Indiana
- Mechanicsburg, Ohio, in Champaign County
- Mechanicsburg, Crawford County, Ohio
- Mechanicsburg, Pennsylvania
- Mechanicsburg, Virginia
- Mechanicsburg, West Virginia

== Fiction ==
- Mechanicsburg, a fictional European city in the comic series Girl Genius

== See also ==
- Mechanicsville
