= Transpeninsular Line =

North-south border line for Delaware and Maryland

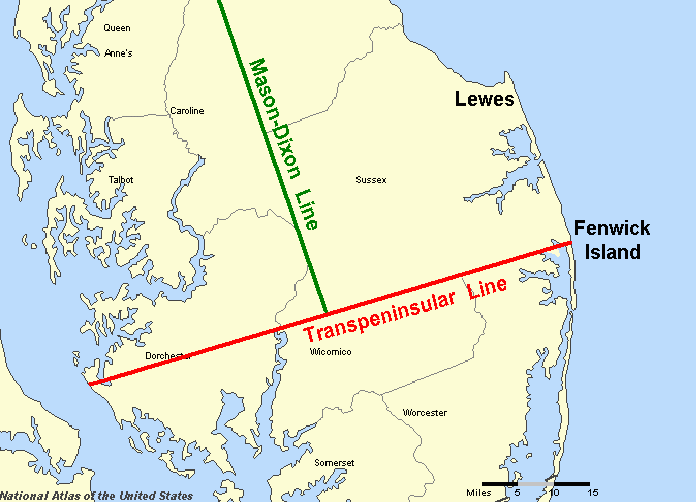
The Transpeninsular Line and the "Tangent Line" portion of the Mason–Dixon Line

The Transpeninsular Line (at approximately 38°27′ N) is a surveyed line, the eastern half of which forms the north–south border between Delaware and Maryland. The border turns roughly north from the midpoint of the line towards the Twelve-Mile Circle, which forms much of the remainder of the Delaware land border.

== Overview ==
In 1751, a line was surveyed straight across the Delmarva Peninsula beginning at what at least some early Swedish settlers called Cape Hinlopen, which was later to become the southern boundary of Delaware. This place is better known as Fenwick Island. Twenty-four miles north is another cape named Cape Henlopen near Lewes, Delaware. Various spellings of henlopen mean "entering in" or "approaching," although one authority insists it means "runaway cape." The confusion of the placement of Cape Henlopen was the crux of a long-standing dispute between the Penns (Delaware) and the Calverts (Maryland), the latter claiming the Lewes' cape should have been the start of the boundary line. A map commissioned by Charles Calvert in 1732 which showed Cape Henlopen at Fenwick Island was used to decide the matter, although the map commissioned by Calvert was based on a 1651 map by Nicholas Visscher owned by William Penn. Calvert had accepted Penn's map which depicted Cape Henlopen at approximately 38°27′ N. Calvert discovered the mistake only after he had submitted the map he had commissioned to the English court deciding the case. Calvert failed in his later attempts to have the court reject his own map. If the actual Cape Henlopen near Lewes had been used as the start of the line, Delaware would be about one thousand square miles smaller, losing over a third of its current area. In 1751 a line was surveyed from the Court-designated point on the Atlantic coast (Penn's Cape Henlopen) to the Chesapeake Bay, and in turn was used by Charles Mason and Jeremiah Dixon (of Mason–Dixon line fame) in 1763 when they were engaged to survey the north-south border between Maryland and the three southern counties of Pennsylvania, which became Delaware 13 years later).

The Transpeninsular Line splits several Delmarva communities, separating them between the two states. The best known are Delmar, Delaware, and Delmar, Maryland, which derive their name from the two states' names.

A Transpeninsular Line marker can be found near the Fenwick Island Lighthouse, at the northern boundary of Ocean City, Maryland, located on 146th Street. The midpoint Transpeninsular Line marker can be found on the north side of Route 54 about halfway between Delmar and Mardela Springs, Maryland. This marker is also the southern endpoint of the Mason–Dixon Line.

== See also ==
- Penn–Calvert Boundary Dispute
- The Wedge
- The Twelve-Mile Circle
- Mason–Dixon line
