= Mechanicsville, Missouri =

Unincorporated community in Missouri, U.S.

Coordinates: 38°41′33″N 90°47′54″W

Mechanicsville is an unincorporated community in St. Charles County, in the U.S. state of Missouri.

== History ==
A post office called Mechanicsville was established in 1871, and remained in operation until 1900. A share of the first settlers being mechanics by trade most likely caused this name to be selected for both post office and town.
