= Delaware–Maryland–Pennsylvania Tri-State Point =

Border marker

- Delaware–Maryland–Pennsylvania Tri‑State Point
- U.S. Historic district – Contributing property
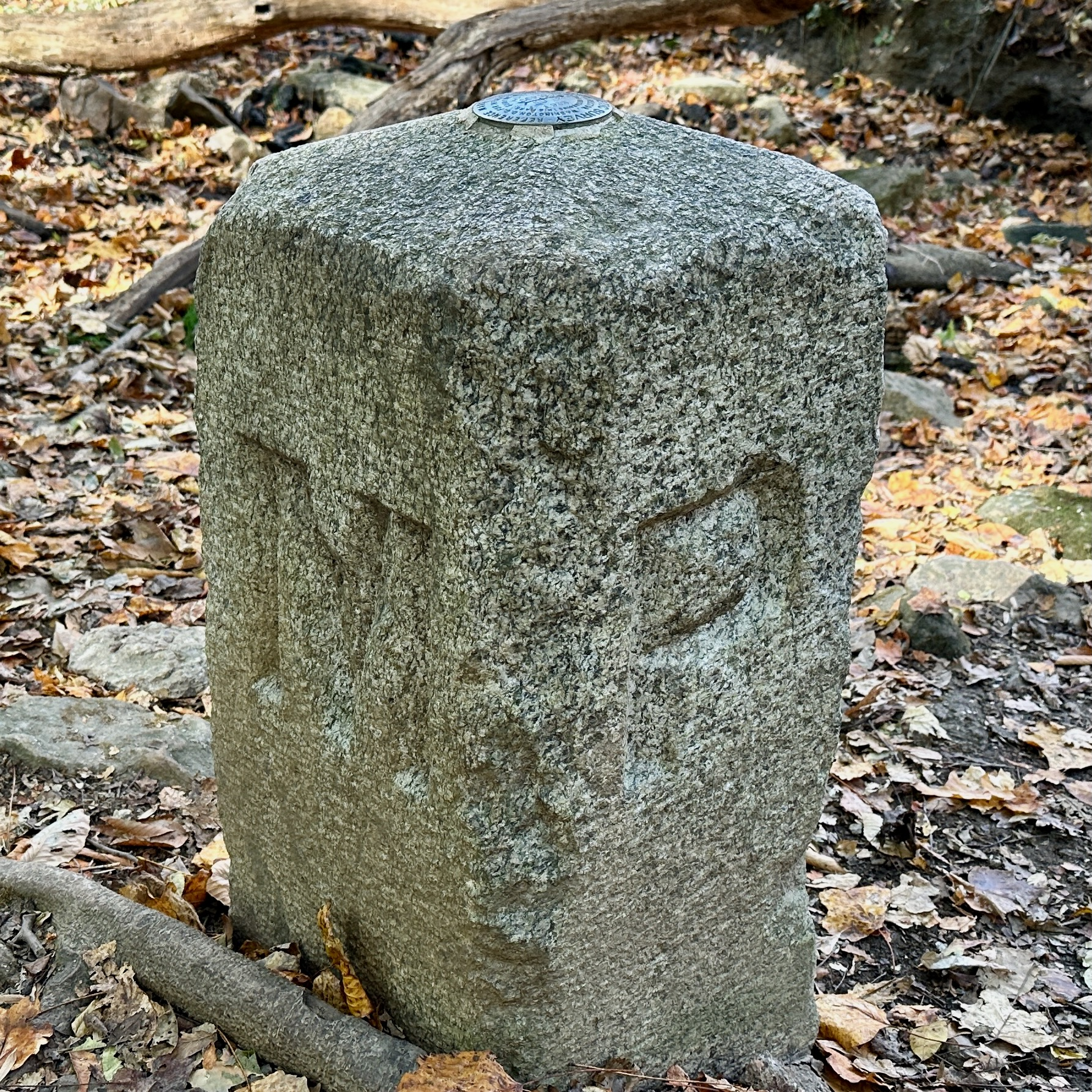
- Tri-State Monument, engraved M and P
- Interactive map of Delaware–Maryland–Pennsylvania Tri‑State Point
- Coordinates: 39°43′20″N 75°47′19″W
- Part of: Delaware Boundary Markers (ID75002101)
- Designated CP: February 18, 1975

The Delaware–Maryland–Pennsylvania Tri-State Point is the meeting of the northwestern corner of Delaware, the northeastern corner of Maryland, and the southern edge of Pennsylvania. A wooden marker was placed in 1765, by Charles Mason and Jeremiah Dixon, and was replaced with a stone marker in 1849. The tripoint site contributes to the Delaware Boundary Markers historic district, listed on the National Register of Historic Places in 1975. A trail to the marker was made in 2014–2015.

== History ==
Mason and Dixon placed a wooden marker on the tri-point on June 6, 1765. It was replaced in 1849 by a stone marker. At one point, the marker went missing, so Lt. Col. James Duncan Graham, of the U.S. Corps of Topographical Engineers, was sent out to replace it. He located the marker, but replaced it in the wrong location. In 1892, W.C. Hodgkins was sent to resurvey the area, and he fixed the location of the marker. He also set the Arc Corner Monument, part of the resolution of the Delaware Wedge.

=== Tri-State Trail ===
The marker was hard to access, as it was on private land. In December 2011, Pennsylvania bought the land on the Pennsylvania side of the marker, while the Delaware and Maryland sides remained as private lands. A plan for a four mile trail to the marker, the Tri-State Trail, progressed in 2012 and 2013. The Northern Trail, or Phase 1, was finished in 2014, and the Southern Trail, or Phase 2, was finished in 2015.

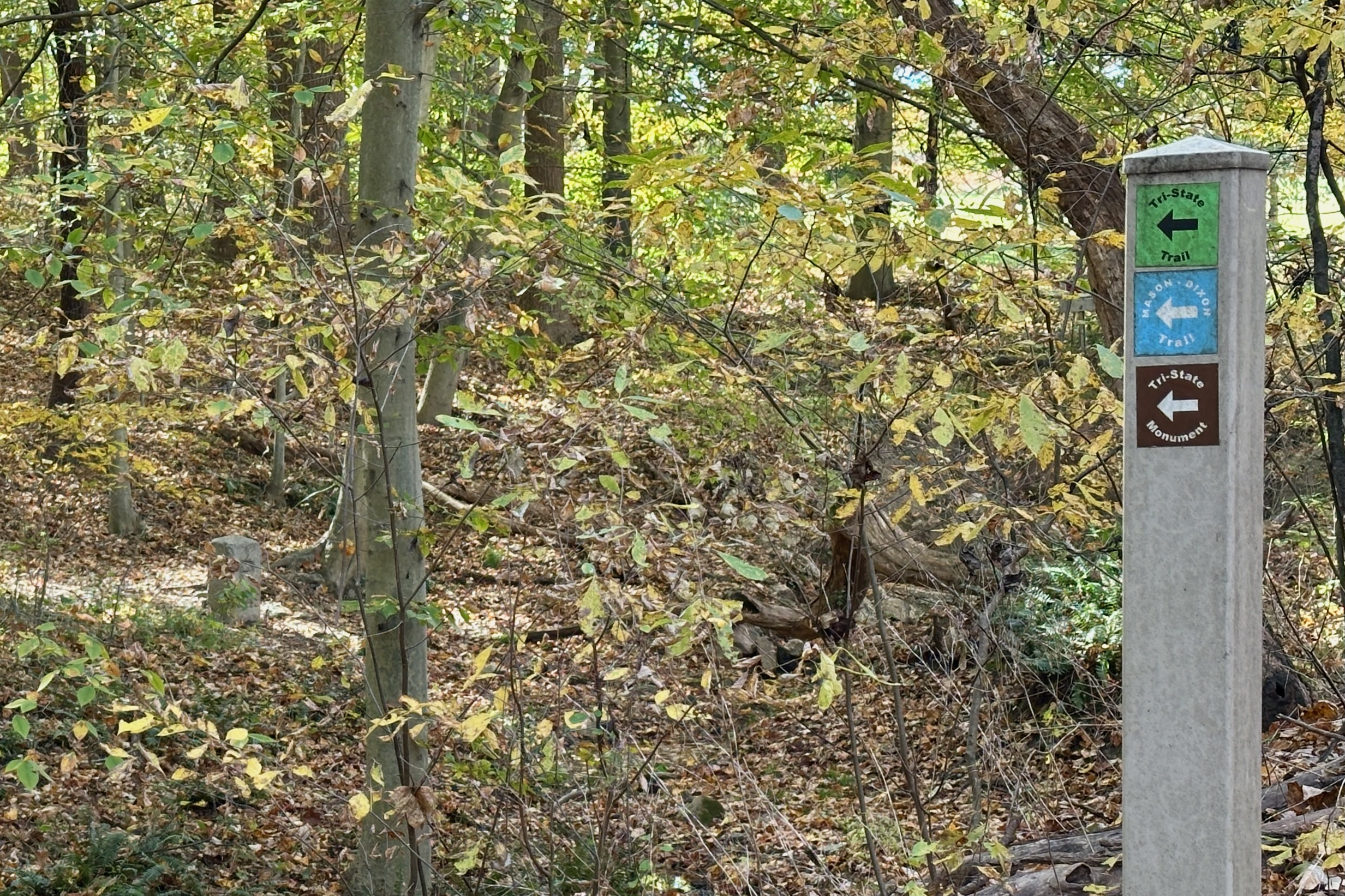
Trail at the Tri-State Monument

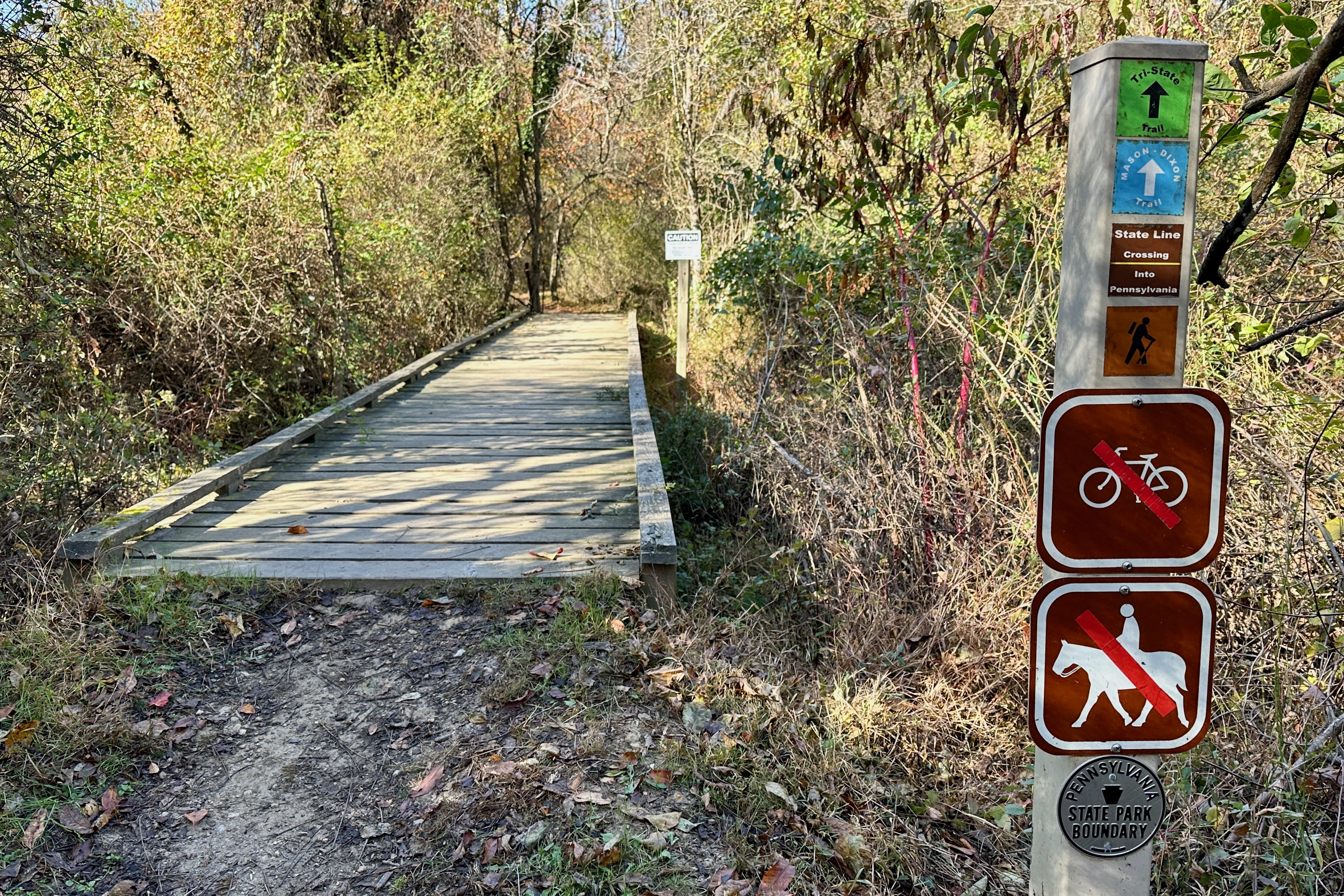
Trail entering Pennsylvania from White Clay Creek State Park in Maryland

== See also ==
- List of tripoints of U.S. states
