= Mechanicsville, Delaware =

Unincorporated community in Delaware, United States

- Unincorporated community
- Location within Delaware
- Coordinates: 39°43′01″N 75°47′01″W
- Country: United States
- State: Delaware
- County: New Castle
- Elevation: 292 ft (89 m)
- Time zone: UTC-5 (Eastern (EST))
  - Summer (DST): UTC-4 (EDT)
- Area code: 302
- GNIS feature ID: 214295

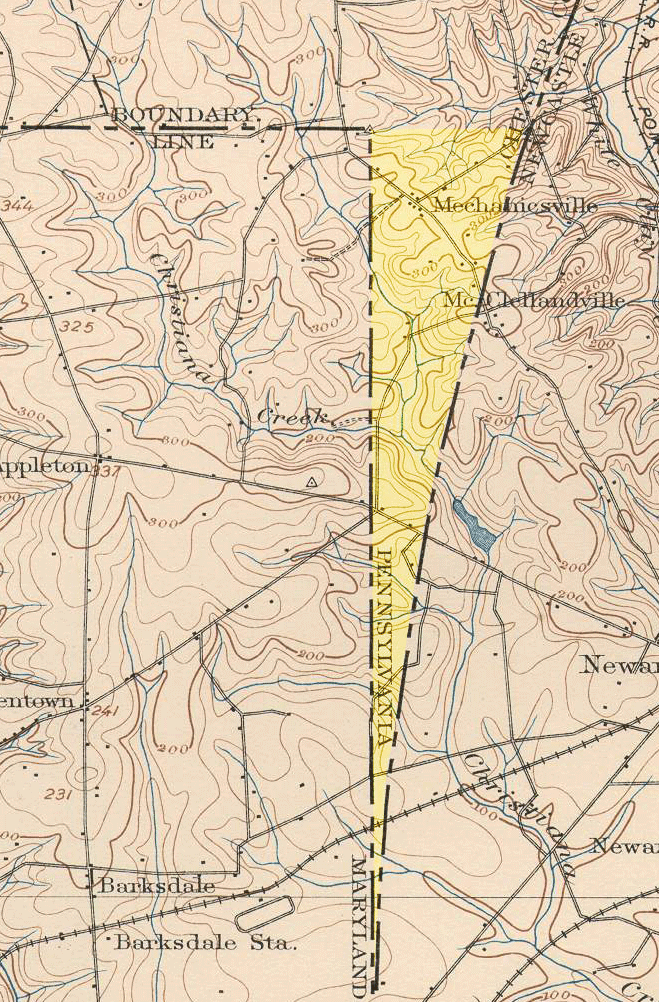
Mechanicsville in The Wedge. This 1898 map places Mechanicsville in Pennsylvania.

Mechanicsville is an unincorporated community in New Castle County, Delaware, United States.

The community is located in "The Wedge", a geometric oddity arising out of ambiguity in the 18th-century border dispute settlement between the Penns and Calverts in the British North American colonies. Until 1921, Mechanicsville was claimed by both Pennsylvania and Delaware. A resolution allocated Mechanicsville and The Wedge to Delaware, which owns it today.

== Education ==
Previously Mechanicsville was in the Newark School District.
