= Twelve-Mile Circle =

U.S. boundary between Pennsylvania and Delaware

Coordinates: 39°39′35″N 75°33′49″W

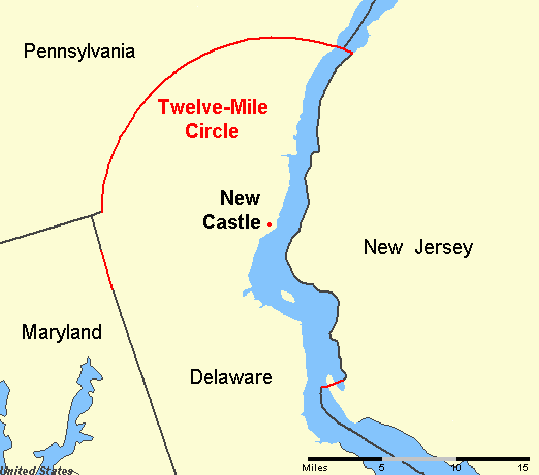
The Twelve-Mile Circle

Diagram of the Twelve-Mile Circle, the Mason-Dixon Line, and The Wedge. The diagram shows the survey lines involved in the disputes, not current borders.

The Twelve-Mile Circle is an approximately circular arc that forms most of the boundary between Delaware and Pennsylvania. It is a combination of different circular arcs that have been feathered together.

It is nominally a circle with a variable radius of approximately 12 miles (19 km) centered in the town of New Castle, Delaware. In 1750, the center of the circle was fixed at the cupola of the courthouse in New Castle. The Twelve-Mile Circle continues into the Delaware River. A small portion of the circle, known as the "Arc Line," forms part of the Mason–Dixon line in the United States that separates Delaware and Maryland. Two other small portions, although not actually demarcated until 1934, form parts of the boundary between the states of Delaware and New Jersey. The Twelve-Mile Circle is one of few circular territorial boundaries in the United States, along with some cities in the South, such as Plains, Georgia, and state boundaries defined by circles of latitude.

Its existence dates back to 1681, when King Charles II granted a deed to William Penn north of the already chartered Maryland. Charles created an exception, consisting of 12 miles around New Castle and extending down the peninsula, since these lands were held by the Duke of York, who had won them in conquest from the Dutch colonists. Later, on August 24, 1682, the Duke granted these lands to Penn as well, giving him:

All that the Towne of Newcastle otherwise called Delaware and the fort therein or thereunto belonging scituate lying and being between Maryland and New Jersey in America. And all that Tract of land lying within the Compasse or Circle of twelve miles about the said Towne Scituate lying and being upon the River Delaware and all islands in the said River of Delaware and the said River and Soyle thereof lying North of the Southernmost part of the said Circle of twelve miles about the said Towne. And all that Tract of Land upon Delaware River and Bay beginning twelve miles South from the said Towne of Newcastle otherwise called Delaware and extending South to Cape Lopen [Henlopen].

The boundaries of the circle were the focal point of the 80-year Penn–Calvert boundary dispute.

The fact that the circle extends into the Delaware River makes for an unusual territorial possession; within the 12-mile circle, all the Delaware River to the low-tide mark on the east (New Jersey) side is territory of the state of Delaware, leaving the river - and bridges - in sole possession of Delaware. Most territorial boundaries that follow watercourses split the water course between the two territories by one of two methods, either by the median line of the watercourse (the Grotian Method, after Hugo Grotius) or, more often, the center of the main flow channel, or thalweg (the lowest point in the stream channel). A similar condition exists between the states of Vermont and New Hampshire.

New Jersey has often disputed this claim, as the rest of its territorial boundaries along the Delaware River are determined by the midline and thalweg methods. In 1813, Delaware's legislature passed an act deeding Pea Patch Island to the United States government, and in 1820 New Jersey disputed that they owned the island since it was primarily on the New Jersey side of the river. Attorney General William Wirt sided with Delaware. In the 1840s, the Pea Patch Island disagreement led to two conflicting circuit court decisions—the circuit of Delaware ruling that the entirety of the river (and its islands) belonged to Delaware, and the circuit in New Jersey ruling that the island had belonged to New Jersey, which had deeded it to Dr. Henry Gale, a citizen of New Jersey. At the recommendation of President James K. Polk, the parties agreed to arbitration, which resulted in a confirmation of Delaware's claim.

The arbitration did not ultimately resolve the dispute, and it has been brought to the Supreme Court of the United States on several occasions (all titled New Jersey v. Delaware), most notably in 1907, 1934, 1935, and 2008. The court's opinion for the 1934 case contained an extensive history of the claims to this territory, and the 1935 opinion enjoined New Jersey and Delaware from ever disputing their jurisdictions again.

Regardless of the Supreme Court's admonition to the two states against further litigation on this subject, they were back before the court as late as November 2005, when New Jersey's desire to approve plans by BP to build a liquefied natural gas terminal along the New Jersey shore of the Delaware River fell afoul of Delaware's Coastal Zone Act. The court on January 23, 2006, appointed a special master to study the border dispute, and on March 21, 2008, it upheld his report, which largely supported Delaware's authority. Meanwhile, the Delaware House of Representatives considered a (symbolic) bill to call out the National Guard to safeguard the state's interests, while New Jersey legislators made comments about the battleship New Jersey, moored upriver from the site.

== Surveying the Circle ==
There are persistent rumors that David Rittenhouse, the famous astronomer and instrument-maker of Pennsylvania, surveyed the circle around New Castle, but this is likely not correct. The circle was first laid out by surveyors named Taylor and Pierson in 1701. The 1813 "Memoirs of the life of David Rittenhouse" by William Barton surmises that Rittenhouse was involved in such a survey in 1763, based on a letter in which Rittenhouse mentions being paid "for my attendance at New Castle," but there is no clear record of what, exactly, Rittenhouse was paid for. His biographer, Brooke Hindle, guessed that Rittenhouse assisted with latitude or longitude calculations.

== See also ==
- Delaware Wedge
- Killcohook National Wildlife Refuge
- Mason–Dixon line
- Penn–Calvert Boundary Dispute
- Transpeninsular Line
