= West Virginia-Pennsylvania Sinclair Cornerstone =

- U.S. National Register of Historic Places
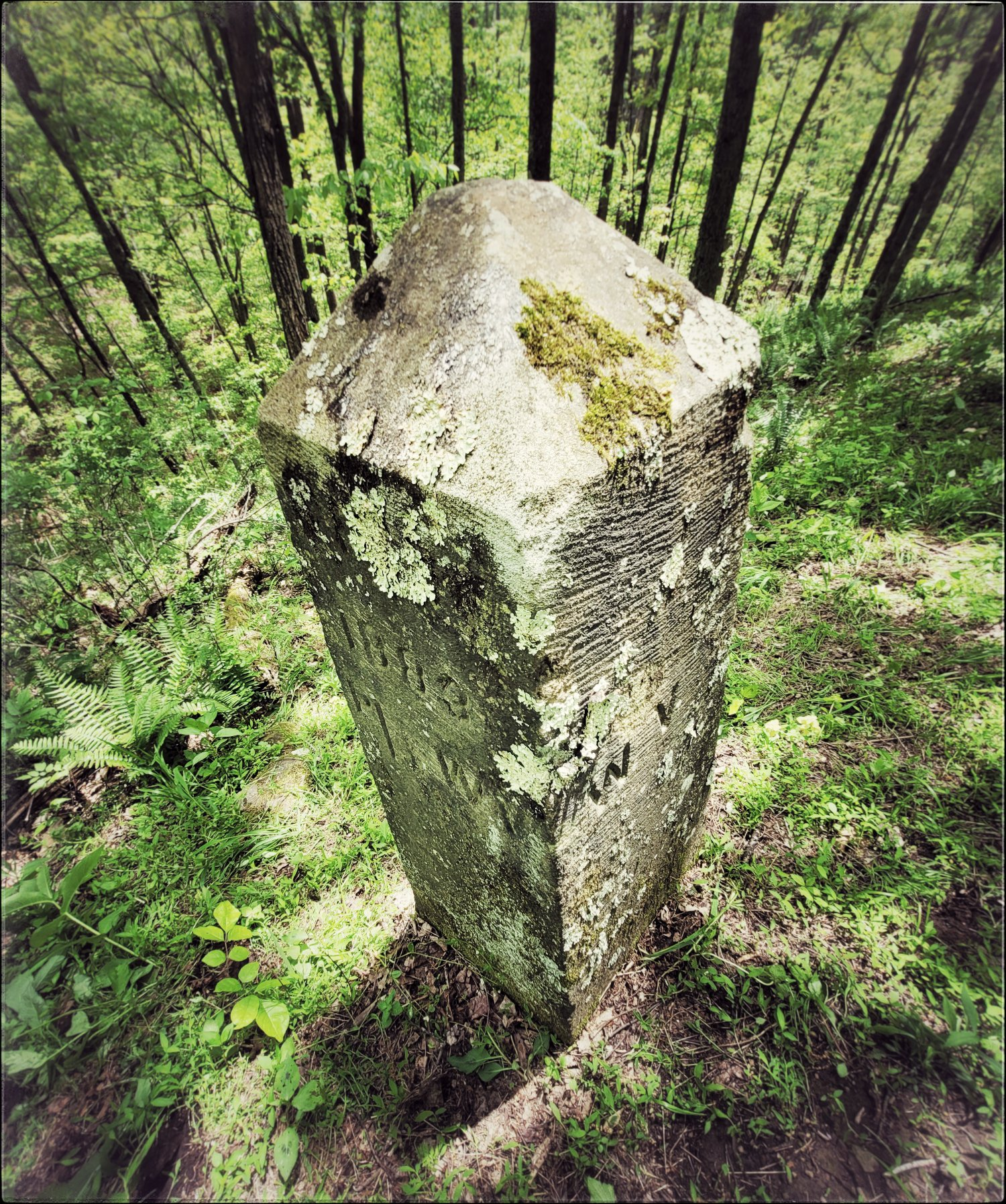
- The West Virginia-Pennsylvania Sinclair Cornerstone in 2025

- Location within West Virginia Location within the United States
- Coordinates: 39°43′18″N 80°31′06″W
- Built: 1883
- NRHP reference No.: 100012202
- Added to NRHP: September 5, 2025

The West Virginia-Pennsylvania Sinclair Cornerstone is a historic marker located along the border of Marshall and Wetzel counties. Located on a remote, wooded hillside near the boundary between West Virginia and Pennsylvania, it identifies the point at which West Virginia's northern panhandle begins, and serves as the western terminus of the Mason–Dixon Line and the southern end of the Ellicott Line, which forms Pennsylvania's western boundary.

Surveyor Andrew Ellicott passed through the area in 1784 while extending the Mason–Dixon line, following the halt of Charles Mason and Jeremiah Dixon's survey in 1767. The present obelisk, dated 1883, replaces an earlier cairn set during Ellicott's work. The establishment of the Ellicott Line helped resolve boundary disputes between Virginia and Pennsylvania, clarifying territorial claims in the Ohio River region and contributing to the eventual shape of West Virginia's northern panhandle.

The marker was listed on the National Register of Historic Places in 2025.

== See also ==
- Mason and Dixon Survey Terminal Point
- National Register of Historic Places listings in Marshall County, West Virginia
