= Archibald McClean =

Archibald McClean (26 October 1736 – 30 April 1786) was an American surveyor.

He was born to an Irish immigrant family in Gettysburg, Pennsylvania. His career began in 1760 when he entered the employ of Thomas Penn, William Penn, and Frederick, Lord Baltimore.

== Mason-Dixon Line ==
McClean relocated to Philadelphia in 1761 where the Penn heirs commissioned him to re-adjust the boundaries of the three lower counties of Pennsylvania and their Maryland borderline. Alongside his colleagues, the project successfully established a middle point between the various territories. From there on he became one of the leading surveyors in the region and chief associate of Charles Mason and Jeremiah Dixon. Beginning in 1763, McClean, along with six of his brothers, Mason, Dixon, and a number of native guides and interpreters began surveying what would become the Mason-Dixon Line. During this time, McClean became Deputy Surveyor for Western York County and thereby moved his residence from Philadelphia to York. In 1774 he is believed to have joined David Rittenhouse in surveying the line between New York and Pennsylvania.

He was elected as a member to the American Philosophical Society in 1772.

== Revolutionary War ==
A dedicated patriot, he was a member of the first Committee of Safety of York County, the first Assembly, and many offices of trust. During the Revolutionary War, when the Continental Congress relocated to York from 1777 to 1778, McClean's residence served as the de facto treasury, all while his daughter Mary tended to ill soldiers, for which she earned a vote of thanks from Congress. McClean died in York, Pennsylvania. He is buried at the Lower Marsh Creek Presbyterian Cemetery in Gettysburg.
