= John Dixon (engineer) =

English railway civil engineer

John Dixon (c.1795–1865) was an English railway civil engineer, and was the Stockton and Darlington Railway's Chief Civil Engineer between 1842 and 1865.

== History ==
John Dixon started work as a bank clerk and in 1821, at the age of 26, assisted George and Robert Stephenson to survey the Stockton and Darlington Railway. Dixon became one of the two Resident Engineers when George was later awarded the post of Engineer. Dixon is listed as an assistant engineer when the company of George Stephenson & Son was formed to survey and build railways at the end of 1824. He assisted George building the Liverpool and Manchester Railway and was at the Rainhill Trials, and wrote a letter, which still exists, describing the event to his brother James. He was an engineer for the Grand Junction Railway, and returned to Darlington become Chief Civil Engineer to the Stockton and Darlington Railway between 1842 and 1865.

John Dixon was the great nephew of Jeremiah Dixon, who with Charles Mason set the Mason–Dixon line that separates Northeastern from Southern United States. He died in Darlington, aged 68, on 10 October 1865.

The John Dixon responsible for transporting Cleopatra's Needle to England was the nephew of this man. He was born on 2 January 1835 and died in Croydon on 28 December 1891.
