= Mason and Dixon Survey Terminal Point =

- U.S. National Register of Historic Places
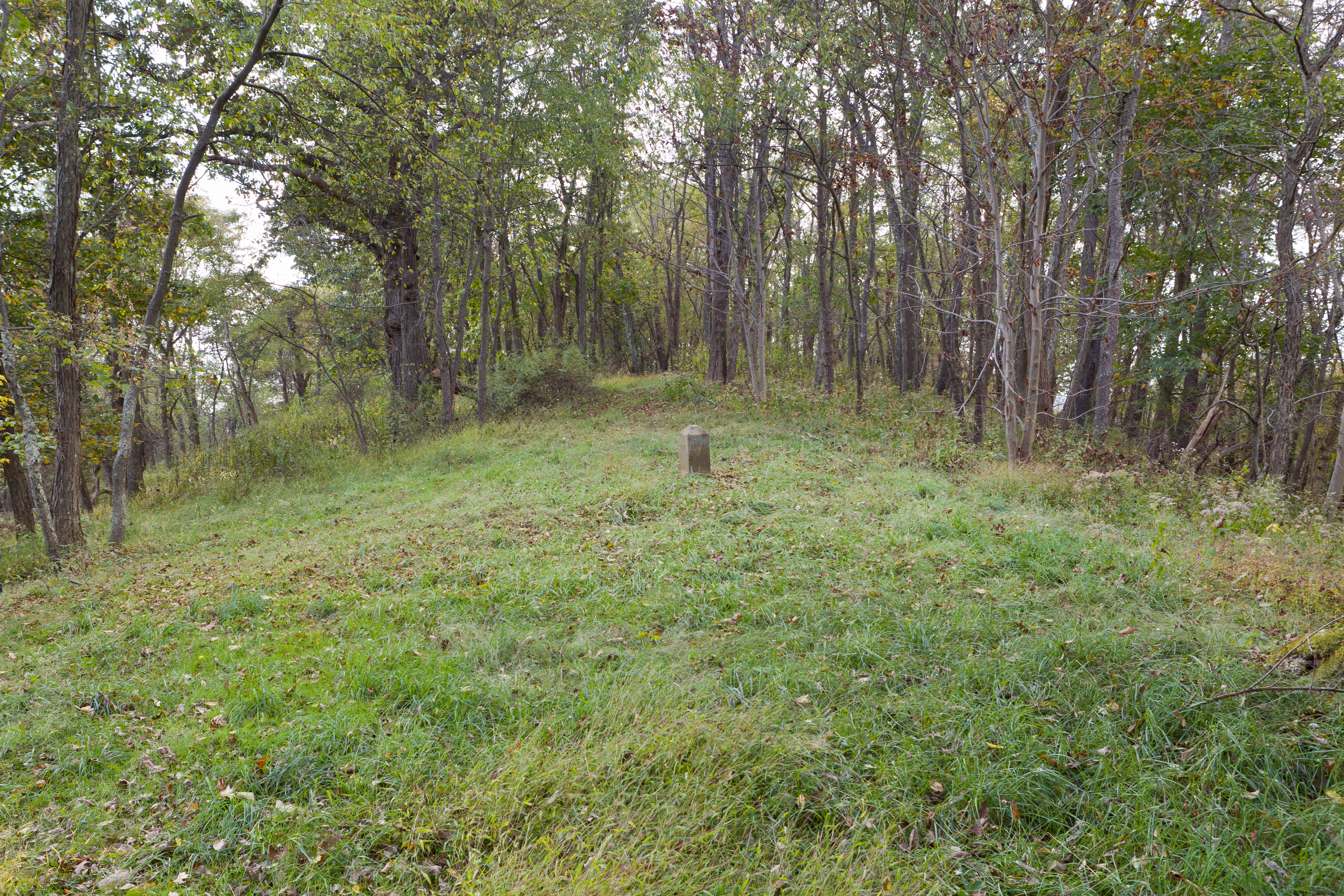

- Location within West Virginia Location within the United States
- Location: 2.25 mi (3.62 km) northeast of Pentress on County Route 39, near Pentress, West Virginia
- Coordinates: 39°43′16″N 80°7′7″W
- Area: 0 acres (0 ha)
- Built: 1883
- NRHP reference No.: 73001922
- Added to NRHP: June 25, 1973

Mason and Dixon Survey Terminal Point is a historic marker located near Core, West Virginia, and Mount Morris, Pennsylvania, United States. Located on the boundary between Monongalia County, West Virginia, and Greene County, Pennsylvania, it identifies the terminal station established by Charles Mason and Jeremiah Dixon on Brown's Hill, the westernmost point of the survey by Mason and Dixon, preserved as part of Mason-Dixon Historical Park.The surveyors took astronomical observations and on October 19, 1767, finally established the point on Brown's Hill. Mason and Dixon stopped here and not at the westernmost point of Pennsylvania because their Native American guides told the surveyors they would not proceed one step further. This was due in part to them just crossing the Catawba Trail. In 1883 Cephas H. Sinclair placed the current stone atop Brown's Hill in the mound left by Charles Mason and Jeremiah Dixon in 1767. This stone marks the westernmost point reached by Mason and Dixon in delineating the common boundaries of Pennsylvania, Maryland, Delaware, and Virginia (now West Virginia), and known as the Mason–Dixon line.

It was listed on the National Register of Historic Places in 1973.

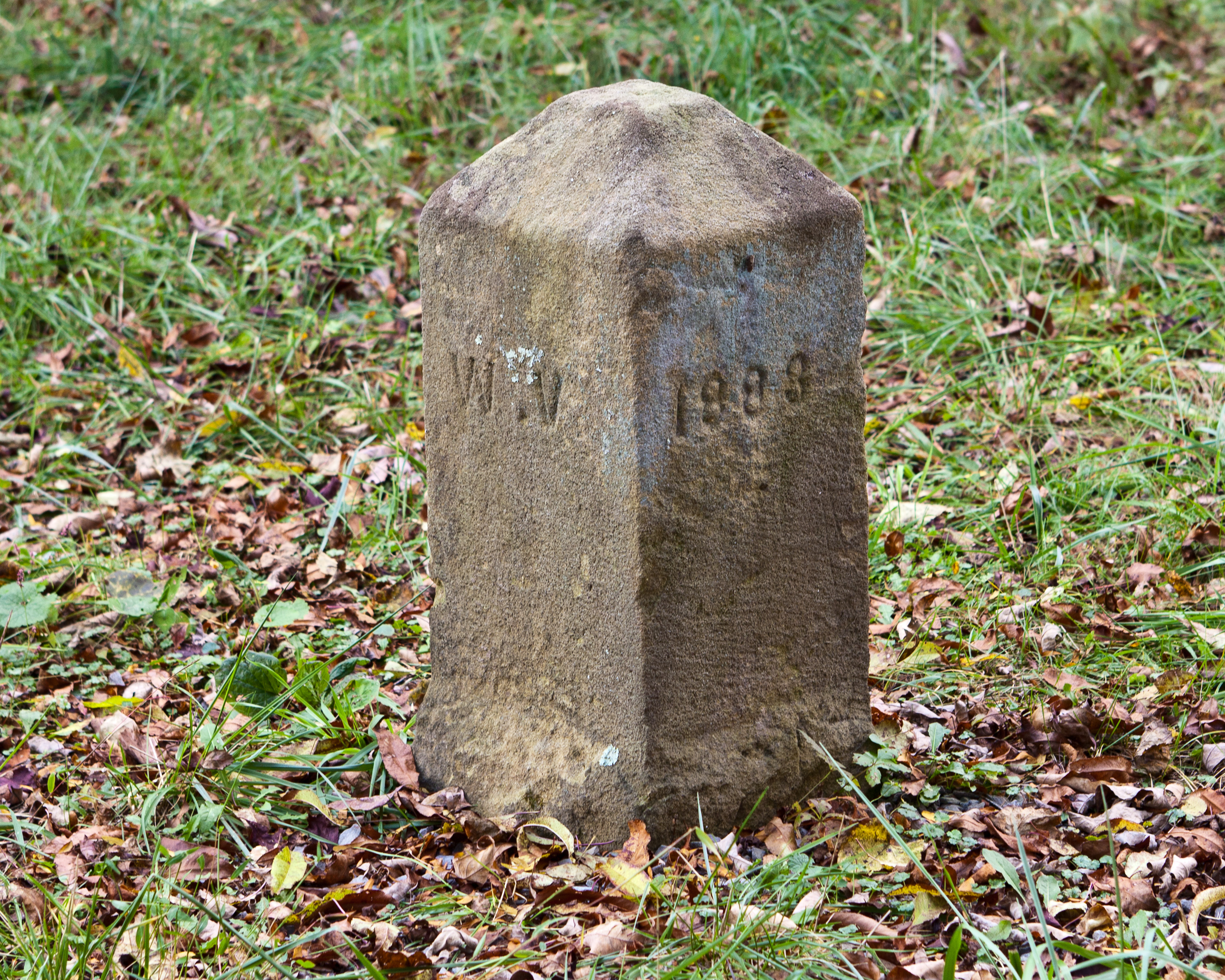
West Virginia Marker Face

== See also ==
- Star Gazers' Stone
- West Virginia-Pennsylvania Sinclair Cornerstone
