= George Dixon (Cockfield Canal) =

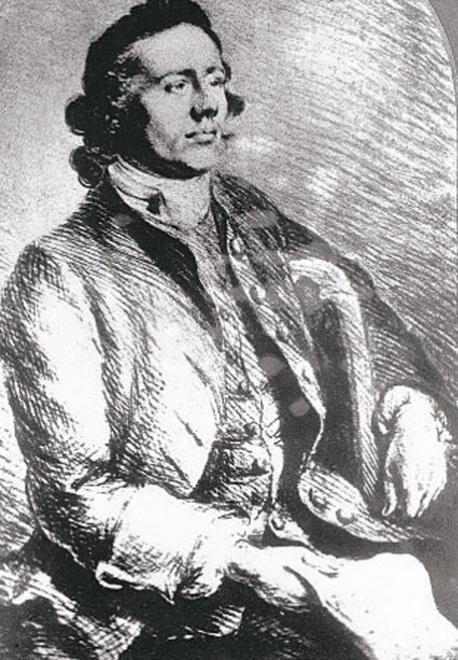
Self portrait George Dixon

George Robertus Dixon (18 November 1731 Bishop Auckland - 29 September 1785 Cockfield, County Durham), was a chemist, mathematician, engraver, china-painter, engineer, geologist and coal mine operator, who helped pioneer the use of coal gas in heating and gas lighting - one of his gas experiments leading to the destruction of his own house.

Dixon was one of the seven children of Mary Hunter of Newcastle and her husband, Sir George Fenwick Dixon (1701 - 1755), an affluent coal-mine owner. Dixon was also the elder brother of Jeremiah Dixon, who helped survey the Mason–Dixon line in the United States in 1767.

In the same year, with a view to easier transporting of local coal, Dixon and other colliery operators, excavated a stretch of canal on Cockfield Fell, hoping eventually to join the River Tees at Barnard Castle or to reach the sea, and dispense with the time-consuming practice of hauling coal over 40 miles (64 km) to the nearest port - he leased a colliery on Cockfield Fell, from Sir Henry Vane, 2nd Earl of Darlington of Raby Castle, where coal and iron had been worked since medieval times. The large cost and factions with conflicting interests ensured the failure of this ambitious canal scheme, but the idea did give rise in time, and with the aid of Edward Pease, to the Stockton and Darlington Railway, which served the same purpose of transporting coal, though passengers were not carried until September 1825.

The coal on Cockfield Fell eventually ran out, the last pits closing in 1962. As a result, the Haggerleases branch (formerly the Butterknowle branch) was closed by British Railways in September 1963. The station at Cockfield Fell still stands as a private house. The closure of the Darlington - Barnard Castle - Middleton line in 1965 signalled the death rattle of a once-thriving transportation network.

Dixon married Sarah Raylton (20 August 1732 – 18 April 1796), the daughter of innkeeper John Raylton and Barbara Dixon, on 13 September 1753. They had eight children: Mary, George, George (infant deaths often led to the same name's being used for the next child), Jeremiah, John, Thomas, Sarah and Elizabeth. The name 'Raylton' cropped up again with his great-grandson Sir Raylton Dixon, the prominent Victorian shipbuilder.
