= David Rittenhouse =

American astronomer (1732–1796)

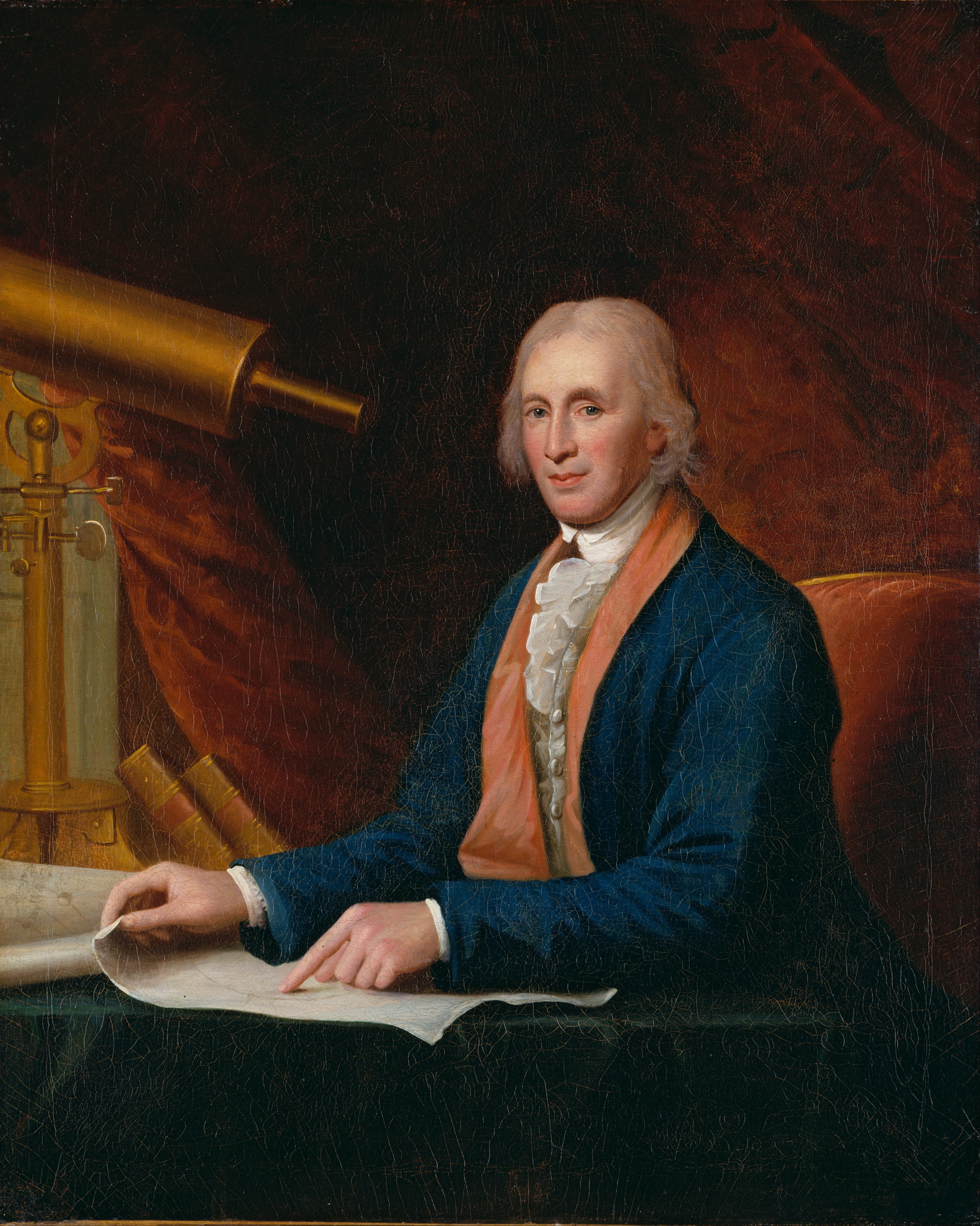
- Portrait by Charles Willson Peale, 1796
- Born: April 8, 1732; Philadelphia, Pennsylvania, British America
- Died: June 26, 1796 (aged 64); Philadelphia, Pennsylvania, U.S.
- Resting place: Laurel Hill Cemetery, Philadelphia, Pennsylvania, U.S.
- Occupations: Astronomer; Inventor; Mathematician

David Rittenhouse (April 8, 1732 – June 26, 1796) was an American astronomer, inventor, clockmaker, mathematician, surveyor, scientific instrument craftsman, and public official. Rittenhouse was a member of the American Philosophical Society and the first director of the United States Mint.

== Early life and education ==
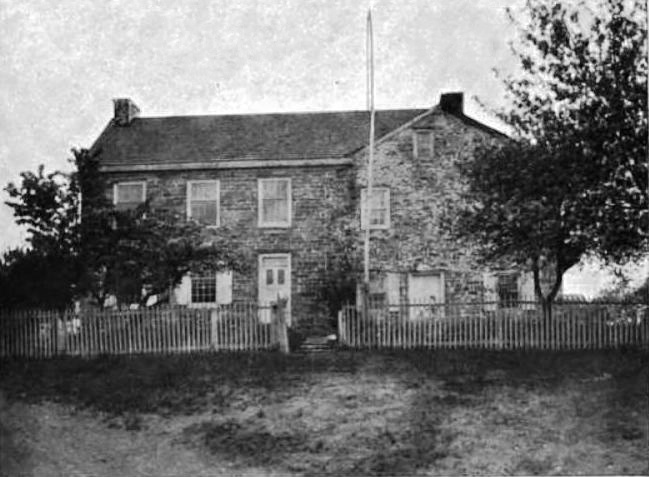
Rittenhouse's home as it appeared in c. 1919; from this lawn, in 1769, Rittenhouse observed the transit of Venus.

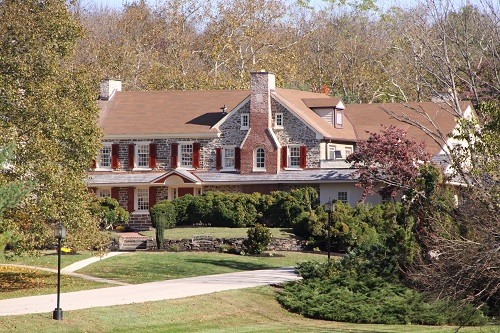
Valley Forge Medical Center and Hospital

Rittenhouse was born on April 8, 1732, in Rittenhousetown, in Germantown, along Paper Mill Run, a small tributary of the Wissahickon Creek. His great-grandfather, who was born in the Rhineland, emigrated to Pennsylvania in 1688.

When his uncle, William Rittenhouse, died, David inherited his uncle's carpentry tools and instructional books. At a young age, David showed a high level of intelligence by creating a working scale model of his great-grandfather William Rittenhouse's paper mill. He built other scale models in his youth, like a working waterwheel. David never attended elementary school—he was self-taught from his family's books, and he showed great ability in science and mathematics. When David was 13 years of age, he had mastered Isaac Newton's laws of motion and gravity.

== Career ==
At roughly age 17, David constructed a clock with wooden gears.

At the age of 19, he opened a scientific instrument shop on his father's farm, which is now the site of Valley Forge Medical Center and Hospital, located in East Norriton Township, Pennsylvania. His skill with instruments, particularly clocks, led him to construct two orreries to scale models of the Solar System, the first for The College of New Jersey, now Princeton University, and the second for the College of Philadelphia, now the University of Pennsylvania.

Rittenhouse was prevailed upon to construct the second orrery by his friend, the Reverend William Smith, the first provost of the College of Philadelphia, who was upset that he would deliver such a device to a college located in the rural area of New Jersey, rather than in Philadelphia, which was seeking to be one of the important centers of the 18th century enlightenment and for the study of "natural philosophy" such as astronomy. Both of these orreries still exist, with each held by its original recipient: one in the library of the University of Pennsylvania and the other at Peyton Hall of Princeton University.

=== Clubs and societies ===
Astronomers who had been studying the planet Venus chose Rittenhouse to study the transit path of Venus in 1769 and its atmosphere. Rittenhouse was the perfect person to study the mysterious planet, as he had a personal observatory on his family farm. "His telescope, which he made himself, utilized grating intervals and spider threads on the focus of the telescope." His telescope is similar to some modern-day telescopes. Rittenhouse served on the American Astronomical Society, and this was another factor in being chosen to study Venus. Throughout his life, he had the honour of serving on multiple clubs and committees.

In 1768, Rittenhouse was elected to membership in the American Philosophical Society. He served as librarian, secretary, and after Benjamin Franklin died in 1790, he became vice president then served as president of the society until 1796. He was elected a Fellow of the American Academy of Arts and Sciences in 1782.

Another one of his interests was the Royal Society of London of which he was a member. It was rare for an American to be a member of this exclusive British society.

In 1786, Rittenhouse built a new Georgian-style house on the corner of 4th and Arch streets in Philadelphia, next to an octagonal observatory he had already built. At this house, he maintained a Wednesday evening salon meeting with Benjamin Franklin, Francis Hopkinson, Pierre Eugene du Simitiere, and others. Thomas Jefferson wrote that he would rather attend one of these meetings "than spend a whole week in Paris."

== Family ==
Rittenhouse was married twice. He married Eleanor Coulston on February 20, 1766, and they had two daughters: Elizabeth (born 1767) and Ester (born 1769). Eleanor died on February 23, 1771, at age 35, from complications during the birth of their third baby, who died at birth.

David married his second wife, Hannah Jacobs, in late 1772. They had an unnamed baby, who died at birth in late 1773. Hannah survived David by more than three years, dying in late 1799.

David's grandson, the son of Ester, was named David Rittenhouse Waters.

== Notable contributions to the United States ==
David Rittenhouse made several breakthroughs that were important to the United States. During the first part of his career, he was a surveyor for Great Britain, and later served in the Pennsylvania government. His 1763–1764 survey of the Delaware–Pennsylvania border was a 12-mile (19 km) circle about the Court House in New Castle, Delaware, to define the northern border of Delaware. Rittenhouse's work was so precise and well-documented that it was incorporated without modification into Charles Mason and Jeremiah Dixon's survey of the Pennsylvania–Maryland border.

Later, Rittenhouse helped establish the boundaries of several other states and commonwealths, both before and after the Declaration of Independence, including those between New Jersey, New York, and Pennsylvania. In 1763, Mason and Dixon began surveying the Pennsylvania–Maryland border, but their work was interrupted in 1767. In 1784, Rittenhouse and Andrew Ellicott completed this survey of the Mason–Dixon line to the southwest corner of Pennsylvania. When Rittenhouse's work as a surveyor ended, he resumed his scientific interests.

=== Transit of Venus ===
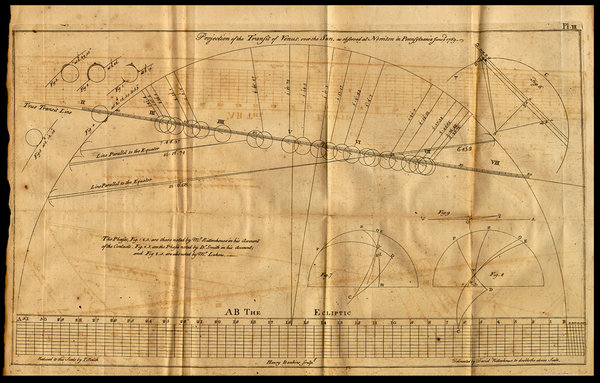
A diagram from Rittenhouse's observations of the 1769 transit of Venus

In 1768, the same year that he became a member of the American Philosophical Society, Rittenhouse announced plans to observe a pending transit of Venus across the Sun from several locations. The American Philosophical Society persuaded the legislature to grant £100 towards the purchase of new telescopes, and members volunteered to staff half of the 22 telescope stations when the event arrived.

The transit of Venus occurred on June 3, 1769. Rittenhouse's great excitement at observing the infrequently occurring transit of Venus (for which he had prepared for a year) resulted in his fainting during the observation. In addition to the work involved in the preparations, he had also been ill the week before the transit. Lying on his back beneath the telescope, trained at the afternoon sun, he regained consciousness after a few minutes and continued his observations. His account of the transit, published in the American Philosophical Society's Transactions, does not mention his fainting, though it is otherwise meticulous and well-documented.

Rittenhouse used the observations to calculate the distance from Earth to the Sun to be 93 million miles. (This is the approximate average distance between Earth and the Sun.) European scientists hailed the published report of the transit, and Rittenhouse would correspond with famous contemporary astronomers, such as Jérôme Lalande and Franz Xaver von Zach.

=== Orrery ===
In 1770, Rittenhouse completed an advanced orrery; that is, a mechanical model of the Solar System. In recognition of the achievement, the College of New Jersey granted Rittenhouse an honorary degree. The college then acquired ownership of the orrery. Rittenhouse made a new, more advanced model, which remained in Philadelphia. The State of Pennsylvania paid Rittenhouse £300 as a tribute for his achievement. One of Rittenhouse's hands or helpers with the project was Henry Voigt, the clockmaker and Chief Coiner under Rittenhouse at the mint. Voigt later repaired the orrery in 1806 and was an earlier co-inventor of the first practical steamboat with John Fitch.

=== United States Mint ===
David Rittenhouse was treasurer of Pennsylvania from 1777 to 1789, and with these skills and the help of George Washington, he became the first director of the United States Mint.

On April 2, 1792, the United States Mint opened its doors, but would not produce coins for almost four months. Rittenhouse believed that a coin's design reflected a country's sophistication and culture. The first coins were made from flatware that was provided by George Washington on the morning of July 30, 1792. The coins were hand-struck by Rittenhouse to test the new equipment and were given to Washington as a token of appreciation for his contributions to making the United States Mint a reality. The coin design had not been approved by Congress. Large-scale coin production did not begin until 1793. Rittenhouse resigned from the Mint on June 30, 1795, due to poor health. In 1871, Congress approved a commemorative medal in his honor.

=== Additional contributions ===
In 1781 Rittenhouse became the first American to sight Uranus.

In 1785, Rittenhouse made perhaps the first diffraction grating using 50 hairs between two finely threaded screws, with an approximate spacing of about 100 lines per inch. This was roughly the same technique that Joseph von Fraunhofer used in 1821 for his wire diffraction grating.

== Notable events ==
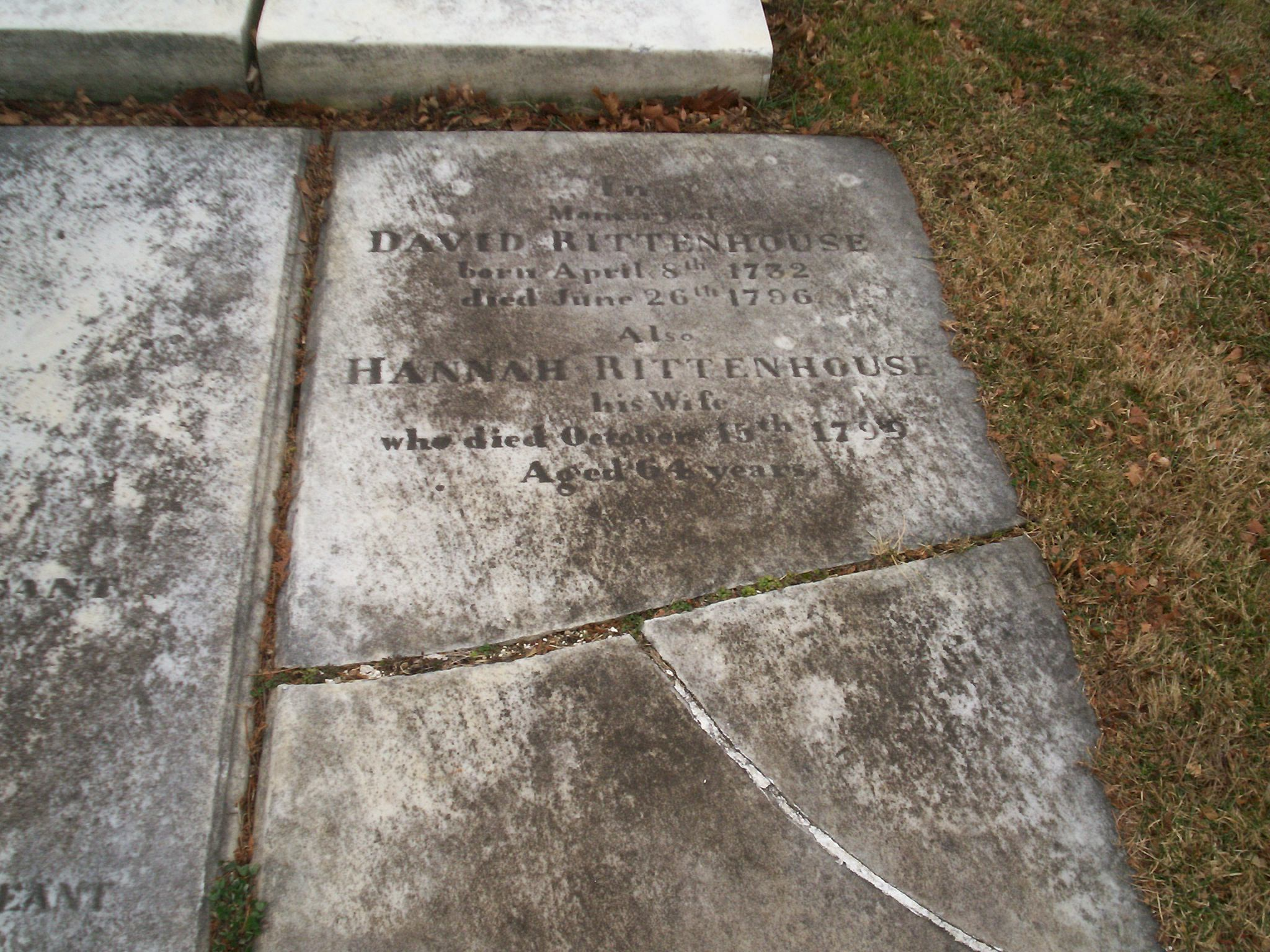
Grave of David Rittenhouse at Laurel Hill Cemetery in Philadelphia

Other notable events in Rittenhouse's life include:

- 1763–1764 Worked on the boundary survey of Pennsylvania and Maryland
- 1767 Granted an honorary master's degree from the College of Philadelphia (later University of Pennsylvania)
- 1769 Observed the transit of Venus; discovered the atmosphere of Venus (independently of M. Lomonosov who observed it during the previous transit in 1761)
- 1770 Came to Philadelphia
- 1775 Engineer of the Committee of Safety
- 1779–1782 Professor of Astronomy in the University of the State of Pennsylvania, now known simply as the University of Pennsylvania
  - 1780–1782 Vice-provost
  - 1782–1796 Trustee
- 1779–1787 Treasurer of Pennsylvania
- 1784 Completed the survey of the Mason–Dixon line
- 1791–1796 President of the American Philosophical Society
- 1792–1795 First Director of the United States Mint
- 1793 He was a founder of the Democratic-Republican Societies in Philadelphia.

== Jefferson's Notes on Virginia ==
In his book Notes on the State of Virginia, Thomas Jefferson listed Rittenhouse alongside Benjamin Franklin and George Washington as examples of New World genius when disputing French naturalist Georges-Louis Leclerc, Comte de Buffon's claim that the environment and climate of North America had stunted the intellect of peoples living there both native and European.

== Tributes to David Rittenhouse ==
- Rittenhouse Crater is a lunar crater named for David Rittenhouse.
- Rittenhouse Square is one of the main parks in the center of Philadelphia, and is one of William Penn's original squares in Philadelphia. In 1825, after being called 'Southwest Square' (because of its location in the original city plan), it was renamed in honor of David Rittenhouse.
- To the west of Rittenhouse Square, on Walnut Street, the University of Pennsylvania houses its Physics and Mathematics departments in the David Rittenhouse Laboratory.
- David Rittenhouse Junior High School, Norristown, Pennsylvania; listed on the National Register of Historic Places in 1996.
- Rittenhouse's nephew and American Philosophical Society member William Barton published a biography, Memoirs of the life of David Rittenhouse.

== In popular culture ==
A fictionalized version of David Rittenhouse, portrayed by Armin Shimerman, appeared in the tenth episode of the first season of the NBC television series Timeless (2016–2018). The series reimagines Rittenhouse as the founder of a sinister secret society bearing his name.

== See also ==
- Franklin stove

== Sources ==
- Keim, Kevin; Keim, Peter (2007). A Grand Old Flag. A History of the United States through Its Flags. New York City: Dorling Kindersley Ltd. ISBN 978-0-7566-2847-5.

Political offices
Preceded by new office	Treasurer of Pennsylvania; 1777–1789	Succeeded by Christian Febiger
Government offices
Preceded by New title	1st Director of the United States Mint; 1792–1795	Succeeded by Henry William de Saussure
