= Cockfield, County Durham =

Village in County Durham, England

Coordinates: 54.61292°N 1.80616°W

Cockfield
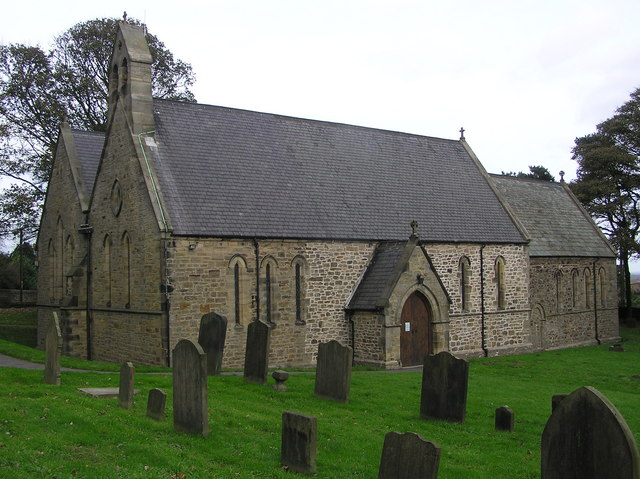
- St Mary the Virgin church, Cockfield

- Location within County Durham
- Population: 1,531 (2011)
- OS grid reference: NZ126242
- Unitary authority: County Durham
- Ceremonial county: Durham
- Region: North East
- Country: England
- Sovereign state: United Kingdom
- Post town: Bishop Auckland
- Postcode district: DL13
- Dialling code: 01388
- Police: Durham
- Fire: County Durham and Darlington
- Ambulance: North East
- UK Parliament: Bishop Auckland

Cockfield is a village on the edge of Teesdale, County Durham, England. It is situated 8 miles to the south-west of Bishop Auckland, 15 miles (24 km) north-west of Darlington and 40 miles (64 km) south-west of Newcastle upon Tyne. Remains found on Cockfield Fell suggest there was a settlement in the area during the Iron Age. The parish church, dedicated to St Mary the Virgin, probably dates from the late 12th century.

Coal mining began in the area in the medieval period. When the South West Durham coalfield was opened in the 19th and 20th centuries the population of the village grew significantly. The last coal mine closed in 1962.

== Notable residents ==
One of the more illustrious families to hail from Cockfield was the Martindale family.

• George Dixon (1731–1785) George Dixon was someone who owned coal mines and was a keen inventor, he was probably the first to use coal gas for illumination. George Dixon died in Cockfield on 29 September 1785 at the age of 53

• Jeremiah Dixon (1733–1779) the brother of George Dixon, Jeremiah Dixon was an astronomer, went to America with Charles Mason in 1763 to survey the boundaries of Maryland and Pennsylvania thereby creating the 'Mason–Dixon line'. Jeremiah Dixon died unmarried in Cockfield on 22 January 1779 at the age of 45

- John White (3 January 1826 – 13 January 1891) Famed ethnographer of New Zealand Maori published "The Ancient History of the Maori". Other notable achievements are his work as an interpreter of Te Reo Maori to Governor Grey during the New Zealand Land Wars. He also, published other novels based in Maori fiction and cultural custom.
- Brian Fletcher (18 May 1947 – 11 January 2017)[1] was an English jockey known for riding the horse Red Rum to win the Grand National in 1973 and 1974 and for second place in 1975. He first won the Grand National at the age of 20, in 1968 riding Red Alligator. Fletcher was born and brought up in Cockfield, County Durham. He later farmed sheep and bred Welsh Cobs on a 36-acre (150,000 m2) farm in Carmarthenshire, Wales.[10] After his move to Wales, Fletcher took part in Harness Racing, winning driving Hendre Harrier in September 2004 at Ammanford[11] and was occasionally invited as VIP to racing meets in the UK.[12]

== Local amenities ==
=== Public houses ===
There are three public houses in the village, the Queen's Head, the King's Head, and the Cockfield Working Men's Club.

=== Shops ===
There are two shops in the village of Cockfield, a Co-operative and a newsagents. The village also has a Pharmacy, which contains the Post Office. There is also a Chinese takeaway and a takeaway sandwich shop.

=== Schools ===
The local primary school is Cockfield County Primary School.

=== Churches ===
The two churches that can be found in Cockfield are the CofE Church of Saint Mary the Virgin and the Cockfield Methodist Church.

=== Transport ===
Whilst Cockfield once had a railway, this was closed to passengers in 1958, before its complete closure in 1962. It is now served by bus services from Arriva North East, Weardale Travel and Hodgsons with links to Darlington, Bishop Auckland, Barnard Castle, Durham (number 6) and the retail park at Tindale crescent.

== Cockfield Fell ==
Cockfield Fell is described as "one of the most important early industrial landscapes in Britain". In addition to four Iron Age (or Romano-British) settlement enclosures, there is evidence within the landscape of early coal mines (the Bishop of Durham licensed mining here at least as early as 1303), medieval agricultural field patterns, centuries of quarrying activity, a railway line established in the 1830s and several earlier tramways. All together, Cockfield Fell constitutes England's largest Scheduled Ancient Monument, described as 'an incomparable association of field monuments relating to the Iron settlement history and industrial evolution of a northern English County'. One reason for its preservation - unusual for a lowland fell - is that it was not subject to enclosure in the 18th or 19th century, perhaps due to its highly industrialised past.
