= David Rittenhouse Laboratory =

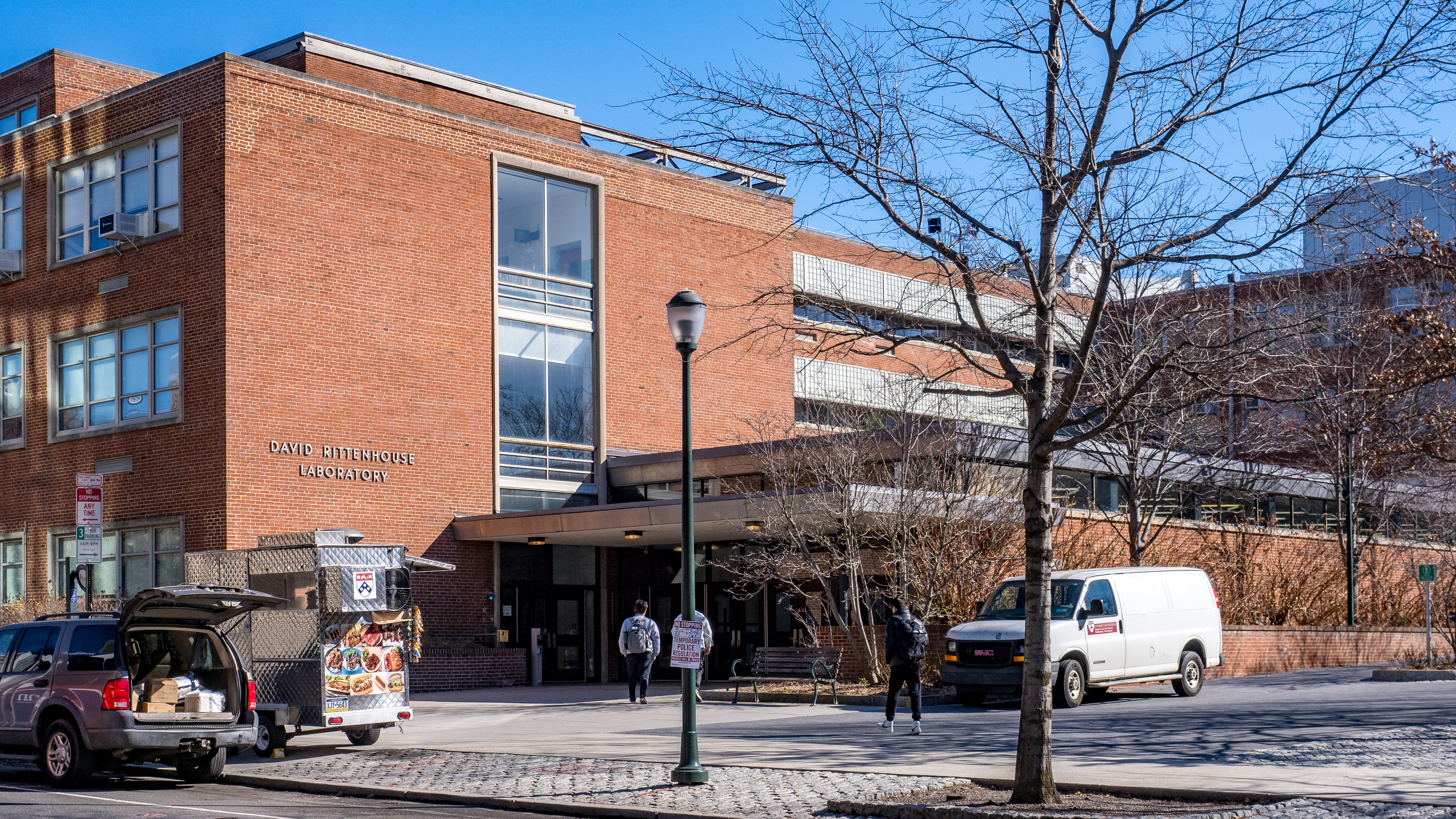
- Exterior, ca. 2024
- Former names: Physical Science Building

General information
- Type: Academic, research
- Location: University City, 209 South 33rd Street; Philadelphia, Pennsylvania
- Coordinates: 39.9521°N 75.1895°W
- Named for: David Rittenhouse
- Opened: September 1954
- Renovated: 1967
- Owner: University of Pennsylvania

Technical details
- Floor count: 6
- Floor area: 243,484 square feet (22,620.4 m^{2})
- Lifts/elevators: 2

Design and construction
- Architects: James R. Edmonds, Jr.

Renovating team
- Architect: Van Alan

The David Rittenhouse Laboratory (DRL) is an academic and research building at the University of Pennsylvania in Philadelphia, Pennsylvania, USA. The building is named for David Rittenhouse, a notable American astronomer and Penn professor of the 18th century and the president of the American Philosophical Society.

DRL is the home of two departments of the University of Pennsylvania: the Physics and Astronomy Department and the Mathematics Department. Many other disciplines also hold classes in the building due to its ample lecture space. Because of this, the building is one of the most heavily used at the university. There is also an observatory on the roof that is accessible to astronomy students.

The three-story portion of the building was constructed in 1954. The four-story addition was built in 1967. Partial funding for the building came from the General Authority of Pennsylvania, which has a seal displayed on the first floor of the building. The architect for the original structure was James R. Edmonds, Jr. though the addition was designed by Van Alan. There are stylistic differences between the two parts of the structure – for example, the windows of the 1967 section on the Walnut Street facade are fashioned in the shape of the rounded-edge television monitors of the time.

In February 2019, a group of faculty, graduate students, post-doctoral fellows, and staff petitioned the administration to fix the recurring maintenance problems (e.g., water dripping from leaks in the ceilings, HVAC problems including poor temperature control, etc.) that occur in the building. In November 2023, The Daily Pennsylvanian reported that the DRL is included in part of a 600 million renovation planned over the next several years.
