= Rittenhouse (crater) =

Crater on the Moon

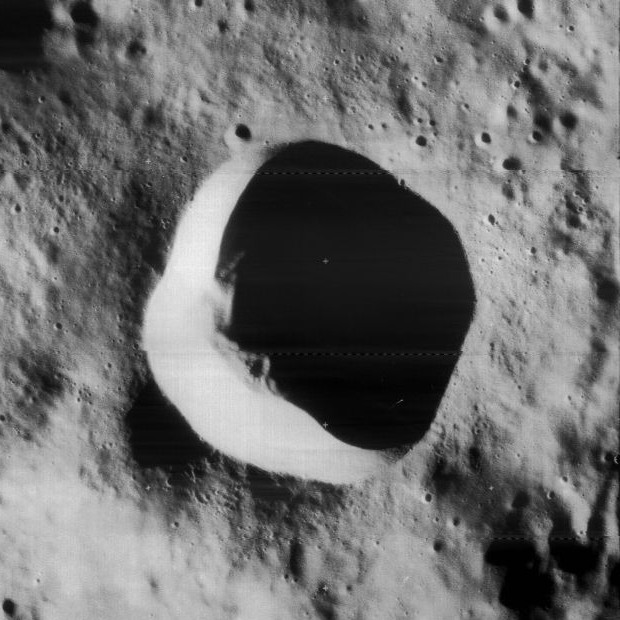
- Lunar Orbiter 4 image
- Coordinates: 74.5°S 106.5°E
- Diameter: 27.50 km (17.09 mi)
- Depth: 3.15 km (1.96 mi)
- Colongitude: 255° at sunrise
- Eponym: David Rittenhouse

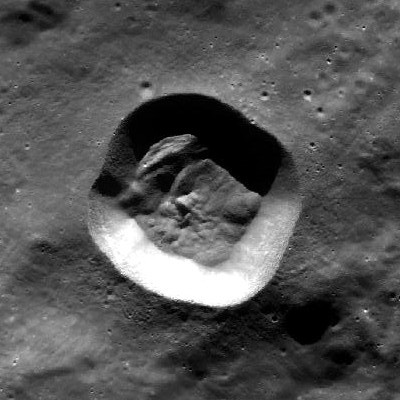
LRO mosaic

Rittenhouse is a small lunar impact crater that is located in the southern part of the Moon's far side. It lies amidst the western outer ramparts of the immense walled plain called Schrödinger. To the west is the prominent crater Hale, just visible from the Earth along the lunar limb.

This is a rounded but not quite circular formation, with a slightly boxy appearance. The rim edge is sharply defined and has received little wear from minor impacts. The inner wall is almost featureless, sloping smoothly down to the rugged and irregular interior.

This crater is named after American inventor, astronomer, and mathematician David Rittenhouse (1732-1796). Its designation was formally adopted by the International Astronomical Union in 1970.
