= David Rittenhouse Junior High School =

- U.S. National Register of Historic Places
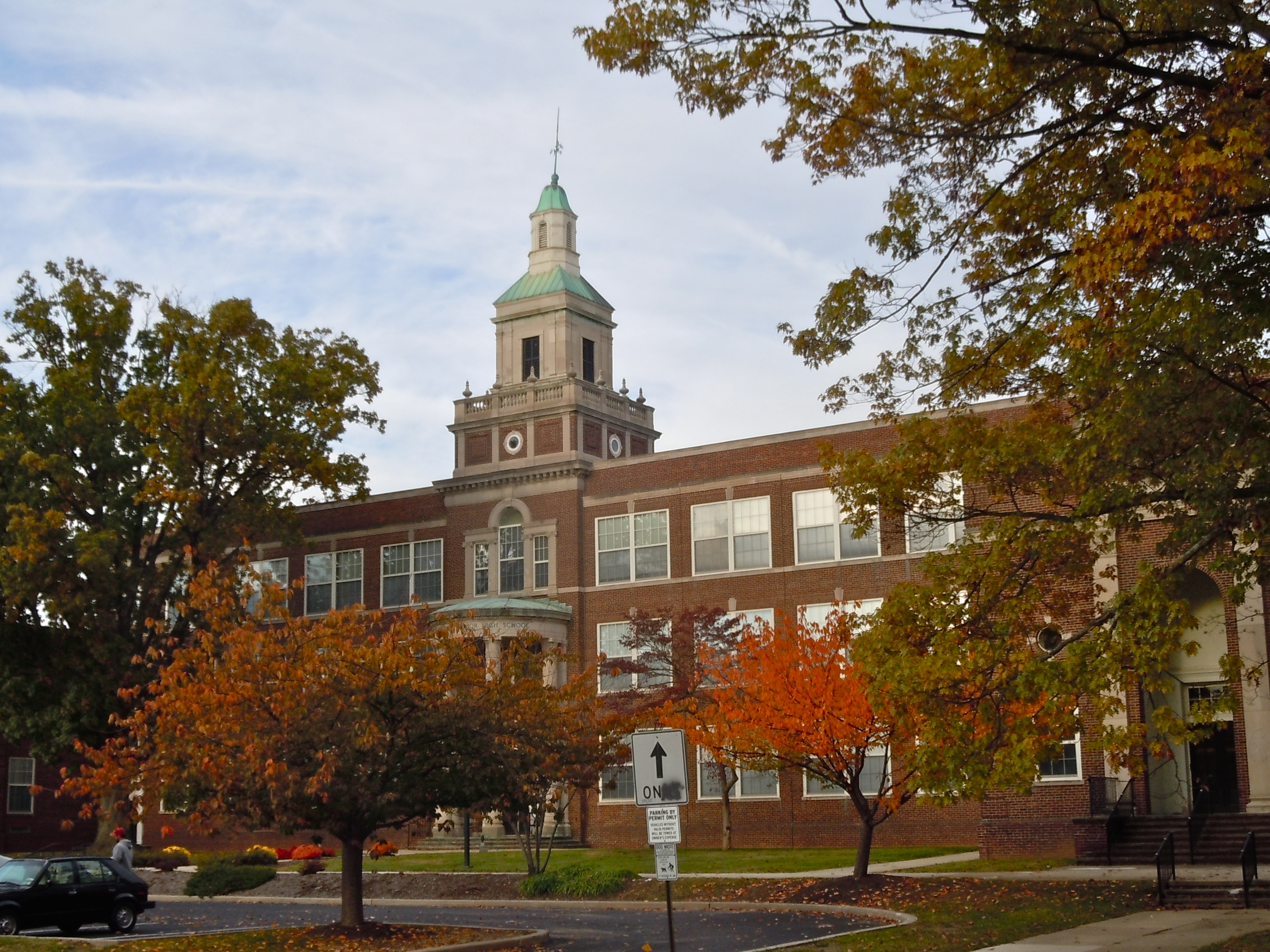
- Rittenhouse School, November 2011

- Location within Pennsylvania Location within the United States
- Location: 1705 Locust St., Norristown, Pennsylvania
- Coordinates: 40°07′46″N 75°19′52″W
- Area: 2.2 acres (0.89 ha)
- Built: 1928
- Built by: Ritter & Shay; Kelly, P.H., Co., Inc.
- Architectural style: Colonial Revival
- NRHP reference No.: 96000717
- Added to NRHP: June 28, 1996

David Rittenhouse Junior High School is a historic junior high school building located at Norristown, Montgomery County, Pennsylvania. It was built in 1928, and is a "T"-plan building in the Colonial Revival style. It is a three-story, red brick building with limestone trim and detailing. It features an ornate, two-story, semi-circular entrance portico, palladian window, and limestone clad tower. The school closed in June 1981. It was named for David Rittenhouse (1732–1796).

It was added to the National Register of Historic Places in 1996.
