= Jeremiah Dixon =

English surveyor and astronomer (1733–1779)

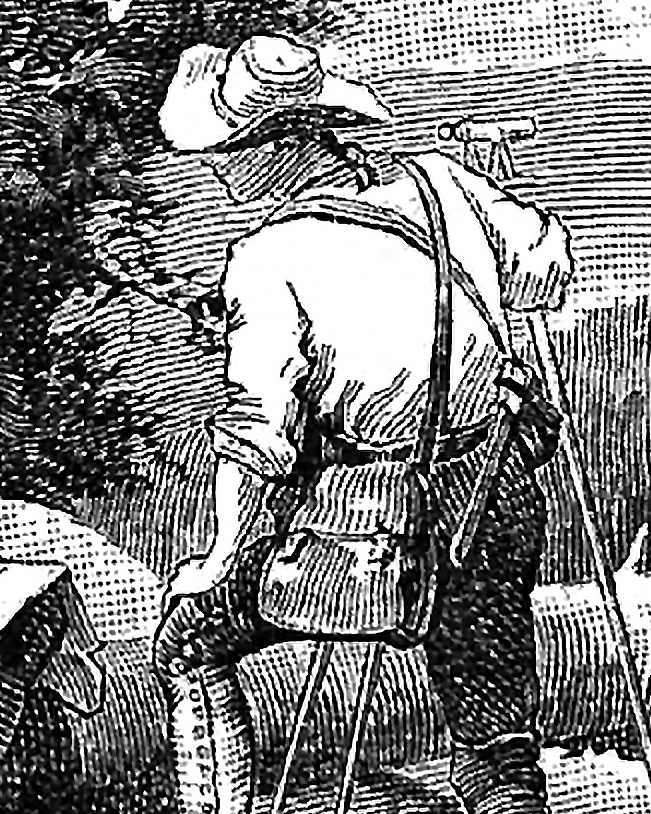
- 1910 artist's impression of Dixon surveying the Mason–Dixon line
- Born: 27 October 1733; Cockfield, County Durham, England
- Died: 22 January 1779 (aged 45); Cockfield, County Durham, England
- Known for: Mason–Dixon line
- Scientific career
- Fields: Astronomy, surveying

Jeremiah Dixon (27 October 1733 – 22 January 1779) was an English surveyor and astronomer best known for surveying the Mason–Dixon line with Charles Mason from 1763 to 1767. The Line came to mark the borders between Maryland, Pennsylvania and Delaware. Dixon's name may be the origin for the nickname Dixie used in reference to the Southern United States.

== Early life and education ==
Dixon was born on 27 October 1733 at his grandparents' home at Henknowle near Bishop Auckland, County Durham. This date is often misidentified as it was written '27th day of the VIII month' in the Quaker style, for whom the first month of the year was March. He was then taken to the family home at Garden House in Cockfield, where he was brought up. Together with his elder brother George he was educated at John Kipling's school in Barnard Castle, where he became interested in surveying and mathematics. His father owned coal pits on Cockfield Fell and a lead mine in upper Teesdale. Given his scientific interests, Dixon may well have known the eminent intellectuals of south Durham, the mathematician William Emerson of Hurworth (who, it seems, may have himself taught John Kipling), the scientific instrument maker John Bird of Bishop Auckland and the astronomer Thomas Wright of Byers Green.

== 1761 Transit of Venus ==
In 1760, Dixon was recommended to the Royal Society to assist Charles Mason, a suggestion probably made by John Bird who, although not a member of the Royal Society, knew many of the Fellows through making instruments for them. The Royal Society duly gave Mason and Dixon the job of observing the transit of Venus from Sumatra. Their passage to Sumatra on HMS Seahorse was delayed, however, first by weather, and then by an attack on 10 January 1761 in the English Channel by the French frigate Grand, which caused their return to Plymouth for repairs and re-manning the crew. As a result, too much time had been lost, so they landed instead at the Cape of Good Hope where they observed the transit on 6 June. They then crossed on the East India Company ship Mercury to the South Atlantic island of St Helena, where Nevil Maskelyne, soon to become Astronomer Royal, had also been making observations. As it happened, his results were compromised by poor weather, whereas Mason and Dixon had obtained very good results.

Dixon returned to the Cape in December with the clock Maskelyne had been using, to work on experiments with gravity, while Mason continued with similar experiments on St Helena. They returned from St Helena on two East India Company ships travelling in convoy, Mason on HMS Prince Edward under Captain Robert Haldane, Dixon on HMS Falmouth, under Captain James Dale, sailing from St Helena on 27 January 1762. They were required by the Royal Society to keep a journal of the trip, focusing on navigation, which Mason did; that document is now in the library of Pennsylvania State University in Philadelphia.

== Mason–Dixon line ==
Dixon and Mason signed an agreement in 1763 with the proprietors of Pennsylvania and Maryland, Thomas Penn and Frederick Calvert, sixth Baron Baltimore, respectively, on 4 August 1763 to assist with resolving a boundary dispute between the two provinces. They arrived in Philadelphia on 15 November 1763 and began work immediately. First they re-surveyed the southern branch of the border on the Delmarva Peninsula, as the border was required to be a tangent line to touch an arc 12 miles (19 km) from Newcastle, a complex surveying problem. They then ran the west line, to reach 260 miles along the latitude of 39° 43' 20", being 15 miles (24 km) south of Philadelphia. After 233 miles (375 km) they were forced to abandon the task as they met an Indian warpath, which their native American guides refused to cross. The survey was consequently not completed until late 1767, following which they stayed on to measure a degree of Earth's meridian on the Delmarva Peninsula in Maryland, on behalf of the Royal Society. The Mason-Dixon Line later became a focal point for the American Civil War (1861–1865).

One anecdote reveals Jeremiah Dixon's Quaker-inspired views:

He happened upon a slave driver mercilessly beating a poor black woman and exclaimed: 'Thou must not do that!'. 'You be damned! Mind your own business,' came the reply. 'If thou doesn't desist, I'll thrash thee!'

Tall and powerful, Jeremiah seized the slave-driver's whip and gave him a sound thrashing. When he returned to Cockfield, the whip came too, and became one of his family's treasured possessions.

While still in America, Dixon and Mason also made a number of gravity measurements with the same regulator (clock) that Dixon had used with Maskelyne in 1761. Before returning to England in 1768, they were both admitted to the American Society for Promoting Useful Knowledge, in Philadelphia.

== 1769 Transit ==
Again at the behest of the Royal Society, Dixon sailed to Norway aboard HMS Emerald in 1769 with William Bayly to observe the second transit of Venus (these events always occur in couplets, 8 years apart). On arrival, the two split up, with Dixon at Hammerfest Island and Bayly at North Cape, in order to minimize the possibility of inclement weather obstructing their measurements. In fact, cloud cover meant that Dixon saw almost nothing, though he did see an eclipse the next day. Simultaneously, the Royal Society had sent Charles Mason to County Cavan in Ireland.

== Other work ==
Apart from these missions abroad, Dixon was, throughout his life a surveyor, mostly working for the Vane family, the Lords Barnard, at Raby Castle. The archives there hold more than a dozen of his maps. He also worked for other clients such as the Bishop of Durham, the Lanchester Enclosure Commissioners and the Surtees family. Apart from being an expert surveyor, he was also a very skilled artist, as is demonstrated by the beautiful cartouches on his maps. His early interest in scientific matters is illustrated by pages of his teenage notebook that have survived, one showing a Newcomen engine.

== Dixon family of Cockfield ==
The earliest recorded ancestor of Jeremiah Dixon was Ralph Dixon, who died at Raby in 1651. There are frequent claims that the family originated in Westmorland, and that they were connected with the Dixons of Ramshaw Hall. However, there is no evidence for these claims, and Dixon is a common name in north-east England.

Jeremiah's great-uncle, George Dixon, was seneschal to Gilbert Vane, Second Baron Barnard at Raby Castle. He is claimed to have refused to bring Lord Barnard more wine, if he drank excessively. He also addressed his lordship in the familiar Quaker style, using 'thee' and 'thou'. Bemused by this curiosity, Baron Barnard's guests bet £200 that George would not address his master so familiarly. Summoned to the table, but then ignored, George did eventually ask 'Pray, what did thou want of me?' and the bet was duly won. A portrait was subsequently painted of George, 'An Israelite indeed, in whom there is no guile', with a quote from Horace: 'responsare cupidinibus contemnere honores fortis; & in seipso totes teres atque rotundus' ('who has the strength to resist his appetites and to contemn honours, who is wholly self-contained).

Jeremiah's father, George Dixon (1701-1755) had held a licence to mine lead at Hunter's Moss in upper Teesdale. This possession — probably very lucrative — was on Harwood Common, near Crookburn Beck, some 30 km up the dale from Raby. The licence was surrendered by his son George (1732-1785) after his death. George senior also developed coal mines (bell pits) on Cockfield Fell near Bishop Auckland, a business his same son George expanded, and he built Garden House in Cockfield, one of the most notable houses in the village. He married Mary Hunter, a native of Newcastle, said to be 'the cleverest woman' ever to marry into the Dixon family. They had eight children, including engineer and inventor George Dixon and his younger brother Jeremiah.

Jeremiah's great-nephew John Dixon (1796-1865) worked on the Stockton & Darlington railway with George Stephenson, first as a surveyor, then as a civil engineer. John Dixon's three nephews were also notable: shipbuilding magnate and Mayor of Middlesbrough Sir Raylton Dixon (1828-1901); engineer John Dixon (1835-1891), who transported Cleopatra's Needle from Egypt to London in 1877 and erected it on The Victoria Embankment; and Waynman Dixon (1844-1930), who was an engineer and Egyptologist at Giza, and later Honorary Consul to Japan.

== Death and legacy ==
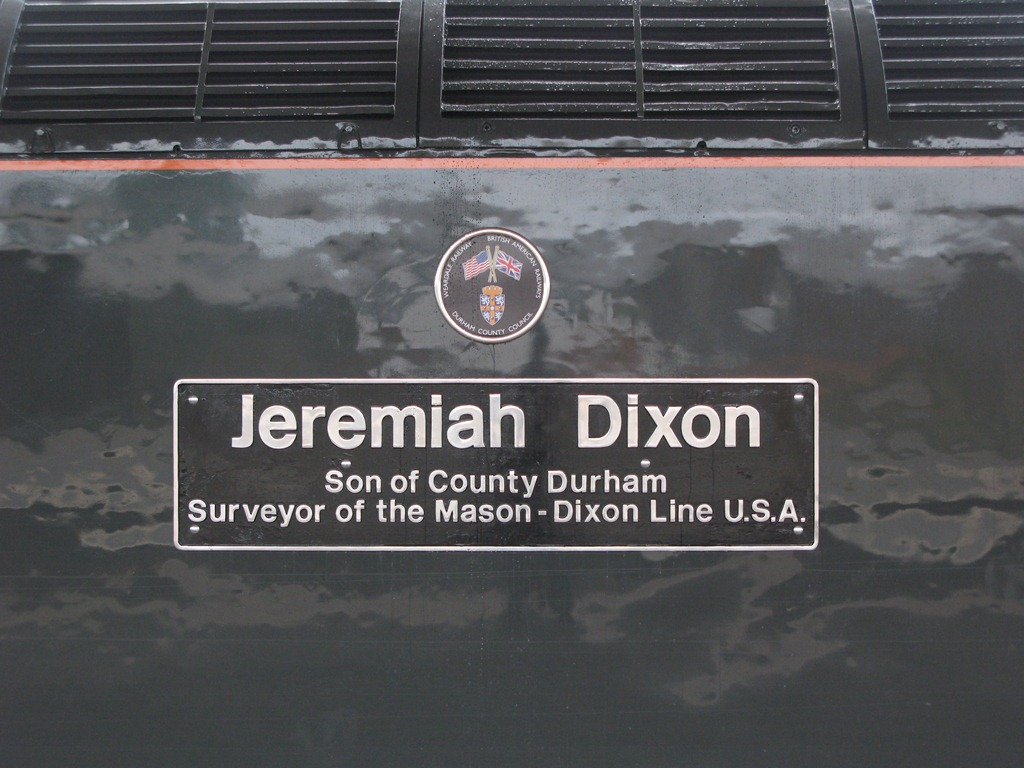
Nameplate of Devon and Cornwall Railway's 56312 Jeremiah Dixon

Jeremiah Dixon died unmarried in Cockfield on 22 January 1779, at the age of 45, and was buried in an unmarked grave in the Quaker burial ground in Staindrop. Although he was acknowledged as a Quaker, he had been known to violate rules by wearing a long red coat, sometimes claimed to be a military uniform, or one from the Royal Woolwich Academy, either of which actually seems very unlikely, and for drinking to excess, for which he was disowned by the Quakers.

In his will, Dixon bequeathed a large part of his not-inconsiderable fortune to Margaret Bland, the Dixon family housekeeper, on behalf of her infant daughters Mary and Elizabeth. It is not known why, or what connection there was; however, Elizabeth was baptised as the 'specious child' of her mother, with no father named.

Dixon's nephew, John Dixon, came into possession of the 'common theodolite' or circumferenter that Jeremiah had used, an instrument made by George Adams. John's grandson, Edward, donated it to the Royal Geographical Society in 1915, who lent it to the Science Museum on long-term loan in 1978.

As to a claim sometimes made that Jeremiah Dixon knew, and even was a friend of, Captain James Cook, this seems highly unlikely. He probably knew of Cook's exploits, but the date on which it is proposed that they actually met in 1775 is unlikely to be correct, as Cook was out of the country for most of that year.

Dixon's name is probably the origin for the nickname Dixie, used in reference to the Southern United States, with references to 'Dixon's Land' from 1835.

Dixon is one of the two title characters of Thomas Pynchon's 1997 novel Mason & Dixon. The song Sailing to Philadelphia from Mark Knopfler's album of the same name, also refers to Mason and Dixon, and was inspired by Pynchon's book. An exhibition about the life and work of Jeremiah Dixon was mounted at the Bowes Museum in Barnard Castle in England in 2013. Titled Jeremiah Dixon: Scientist, Surveyor and Stargazer, it ran from 27 April to 6 October. In September 2013, a locomotive operating on the Weardale Railway in County Durham was named after Jeremiah Dixon. That locomotive now operates in the Willesden area of northwest London.

== See also ==
- Star Gazers' Stone
