= HMS Falmouth (1752) =

Ship of the line of the Royal Navy

History

Great Britain
- Name: Falmouth
- Namesake: Falmouth
- Ordered: 15 November 1745
- Builder: Woolwich Dockyard
- Launched: 7 December 1752
- Fate: Abandoned, Batavia, on 16 January 1765

General characteristics
- Class & type: 1745 Establishment 50-gun fourth rate ship of the line
- Tons burthen: 1,04657/94 (bm)
- Length: 144 ft (43.9 m) (gundeck)
- Beam: 41 ft 2 in (12.5 m)
- Depth of hold: 17 ft 8 in (5.4 m)
- Sail plan: Full-rigged ship
- Complement: 350
- Armament: 50 guns: Gundeck: 22 × 24-pounder guns; Upper gundeck: 22 × 12-pounder guns; Quarterdeck: 4 × 6-pounder guns; Forecastle: 2 × 6-pounder guns

HMS Falmouth was a 50-gun fourth rate ship of the line built for the Royal Navy during the 1750s. She participated in the Seven Years' War and was badly damaged during the Battle of Manila in 1762 and was abandoned as unseaworthy in the East Indies in 1765.

== Description ==
Falmouth had a length at the gundeck of 144 feet (43.9 m) and 116 feet 1 inch (35.4 m) at the keel. She had a beam of 41 feet 2 inches (12.5 m) and a depth of hold of 17 feet 8 inches (5.4 m). The ship's tonnage was 1,046 57/94 tons burthen. Her armament consisted of twenty-two 24-pounder guns on the lower gundeck and twenty-two 12-pounder guns on the upper deck. On the quarterdeck were four 6-pounder guns with another pair on the forecastle. The ship had a crew of 350 officers and ratings.

== Construction and career ==
Falmouth was the fourth ship in the Royal Navy to be named after the eponymous port. Built to the 1745 Establishment design, the ship was ordered on 15 November 1745. She was laid down on 22 August 1746 at Woolwich Dockyard under the direction of Master Shipwright Thomas Fellowes, and was launched on 7 December 1752. Falmouth commissioned two weeks later and cost £19,974 to build In service during the Seven Years' War against France, Falmouth was at sea off the English coast in February 1758 when she encountered and captured a French merchantman laden with sugar, indigo and coffee.

Falmouth was abandoned in Batavia, Dutch East Indies (nowadays Indonesia) on 16 January 1765 after suffering serious battle damage during the Battle of Manila in 1762.
