= Charles Mason =

English astronomer and surveyor (1728–1786)

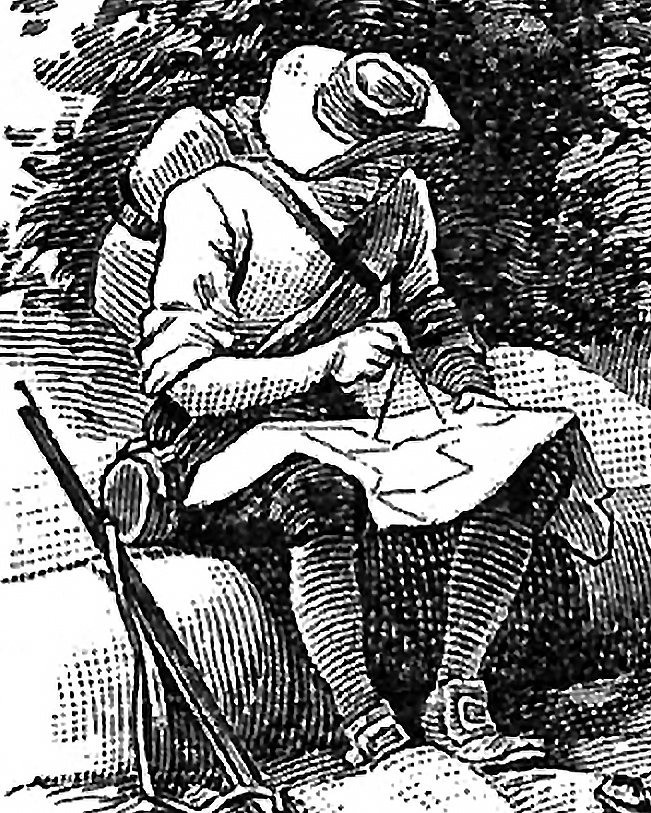
- 1910 artist's impression of Mason surveying the Mason–Dixon line
- Born: 25 April 1728; Oakridge, Gloucestershire, England
- Died: 25 October 1786 (aged 58); Philadelphia, Pennsylvania, U.S.
- Resting place: Christ Church Burial Ground, Philadelphia
- Known for: Mason–Dixon line
- Scientific career
- Fields: Astronomy, surveying

Charles Mason (25 April 1728 – 25 October 1786) was an English surveyor and astronomer who is best known for surveying the Mason–Dixon line with Jeremiah Dixon from 1763 to 1767. The line came to mark the borders between Maryland, Pennsylvania and Delaware.

== Early career ==
Mason's early career was spent at the Royal Greenwich Observatory near London. He served as assistant astronomer from 1756 to 1760 under the Reverend James Bradley, the third Astronomer Royal.

While employed at the Greenwich Observatory, Mason became familiar with Professor Tobias Mayer's Tables of the Moon. The Lunar Tables were designed to solve the problem of determining longitude at sea, a challenge that frustrated scientists and navigators for decades. Mason worked throughout his life to perfect the Lunar Tables as a method of improving navigation at sea. In 1787, Mason's work was recognised, and he was awarded £750 (not the full prize of £10,000 to £20,000) by the Board of Longitude for his work on perfecting the Tables, that £750 being equal to £101,842 today.

== 1761 transit of Venus ==
In 1761, Mason was assigned to travel to the island of Sumatra by the Royal Society to observe the transit of Venus as part of an international effort to record data that would enable scientists to determine the distance from the Earth to the Sun. Mason was joined by Jeremiah Dixon, a surveyor and amateur astronomer from Cockfield in the County of Durham. Their passage to Sumatra on HMS Seahorse was delayed, however, first by weather, and then by an attack on 10 January 1761 in the English Channel by a French frigate, the Grand, which caused their return to Plymouth for repairs and re-manning the crew. As a result, too much time had been lost, so they landed instead at the Dutch Cape Colony at the Cape of Good Hope where they observed the transit on 6 June. They then crossed on the East India Company ship Mercury to the South Atlantic island of St Helena, where Nevil Maskelyne, soon to become Astronomer Royal, had also been making observations. As it happened, his results were compromised by poor weather, whereas Mason and Dixon had obtained very good results.

Dixon returned to the Cape in December with the clock Maskelyne had been using, to work on experiments with gravity, while Mason continued with similar experiments on St Helena. They returned from St Helena on two East India Company ships travelling in convoy, Mason on HMS Prince Edward under Captain Robert Haldane, Dixon on HMS Falmouth, under Captain James Dale, sailing from St Helena on 27 January 1762. They were required by the Royal Society to keep a journal of the trip, focusing on navigation, which Mason did; that document is now in the library of Pennsylvania State University in Philadelphia.

== The Mason–Dixon line survey ==
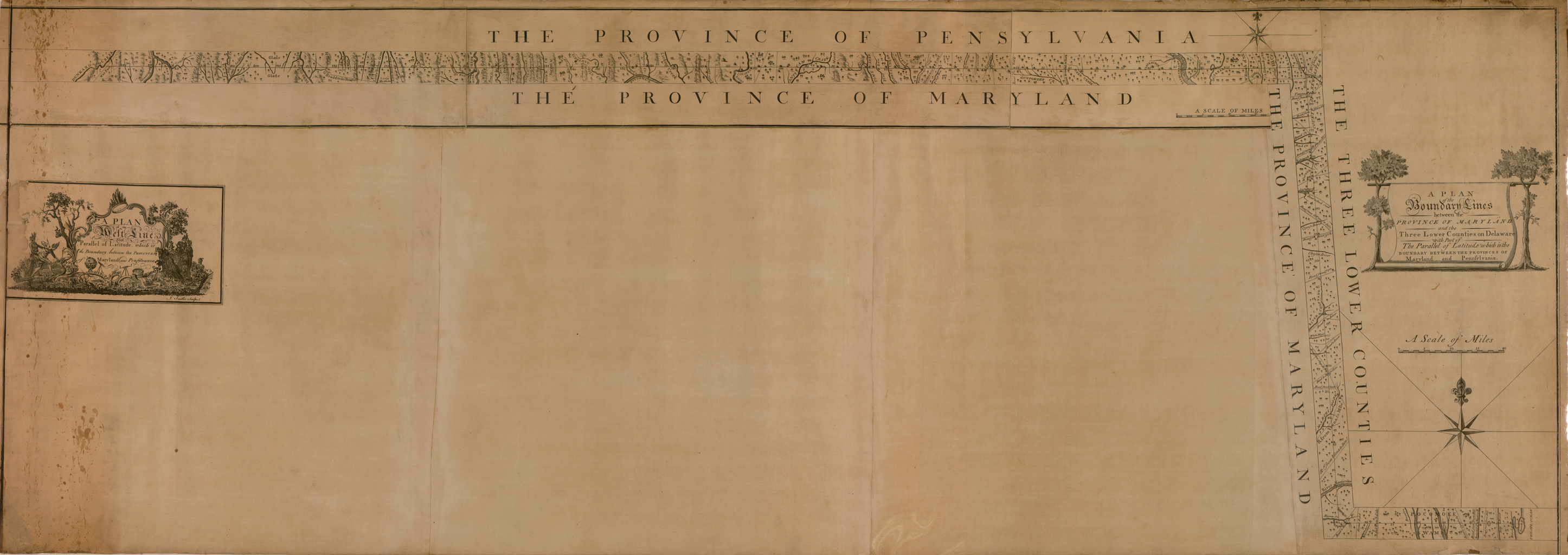
A Plan of the West Line or Parallel of Latitude by Charles Mason, 1768

From November 1763 to 1768, Mason and Jeremiah Dixon established the boundary line between the American provinces of Pennsylvania and Maryland. Colonial surveyors had been unable to establish the boundary accurately due to their poor training and inadequate scientific instruments. Mason and Dixon, accompanied by a large party of assistants, established three important boundaries: (1) the south boundary line of Pennsylvania separating it from Maryland and Virginia; (2) the west boundary of the three lower counties of Pennsylvania (now Delaware) separating it from Maryland; and (3) the south boundary of the three lower counties. The pair also conducted a number of experiments for the Royal Society such as measuring a degree of latitude. Mason's journal provides the most complete record of the survey and its progress. The journal includes his astronomical observations and personal notes about the American frontier environment and his experiences in colonial America.

Mason and Dixon failed to measure the entire length of the south boundary of Pennsylvania as determined by its charter. In the summer of 1767, the surveying party crossed the Monongahela River and the Great Catawba War Path, violating a treaty limiting the westward expansion of English settlements. Not wishing to risk inciting native hostilities, Mason and Dixon were forced to return east after making their final observations at the crest of Brown's Hill.

== Career after the Mason–Dixon line survey ==
After completing the boundary survey in the Thirteen Colonies, Mason returned to Greenwich where he continued work on Mayer's Lunar Tables. He also contributed to the Nautical Almanac, working under Nevil Maskelyne, the fifth Astronomer Royal.

On 27 September 1786, Mason wrote to Benjamin Franklin, whom he knew from his election to the American Philosophical Society in 1767 where Franklin was a founding member, informing him that he had returned to Philadelphia with his wife, seven sons, and one daughter. Mason was very ill and confined to his bed. Mason also shared with Franklin the design for an astronomical project. Mason provided no explanation for his return to the United States, and nothing more is known of Mason's proposed project.

Mason died on 25 October 1786, in Philadelphia. He was buried there in Christ Church Burial Ground.

== Posthumous recognition ==
The crater Mason on the Moon is named after him.

Mason is one of the title characters of Thomas Pynchon's 1997 novel Mason & Dixon. The song "Sailing to Philadelphia", inspired by Pynchon's book, appears on both Mark Knopfler's album of the same name and the special edition of James Taylor's October Road album; with Knopfler singing the role of Dixon and Taylor that of Mason.

Surveying organizations dedicated a memorial at his previously unmarked grave on 31 August 2013, using a Mason–Dixon line stone that was found displaced from its position.
