= Mason–Dixon line =

Surveyed border line between U.S. states of Delaware, Maryland, and Pennsylvania

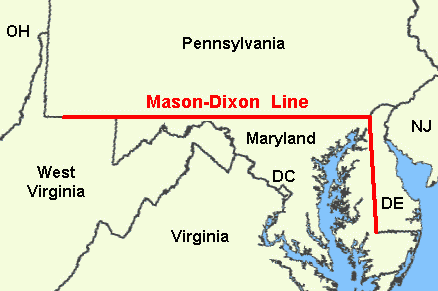
Map of the original Mason–Dixon line (in red)

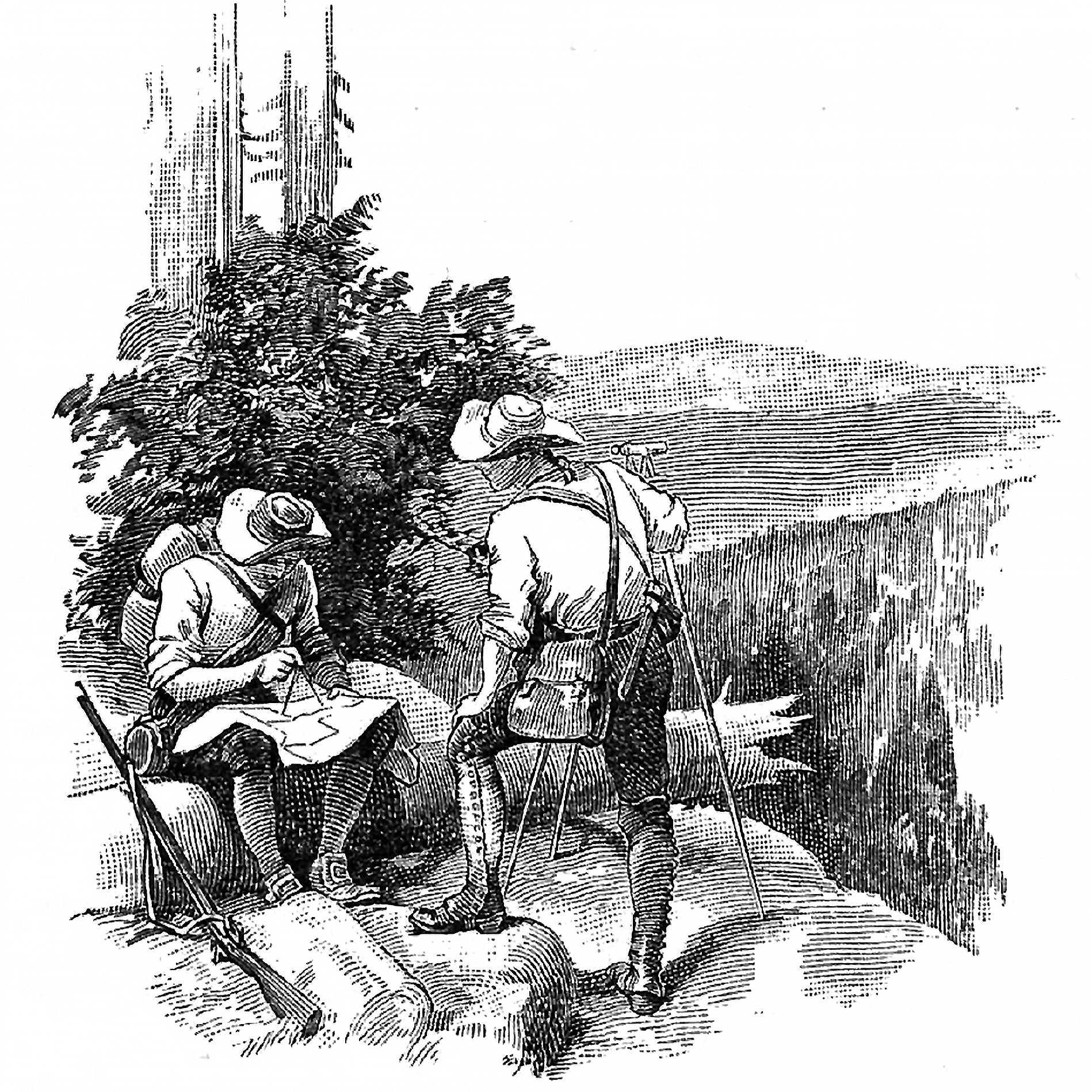
A 1910 illustration of Charles Mason and Jeremiah Dixon surveying the line

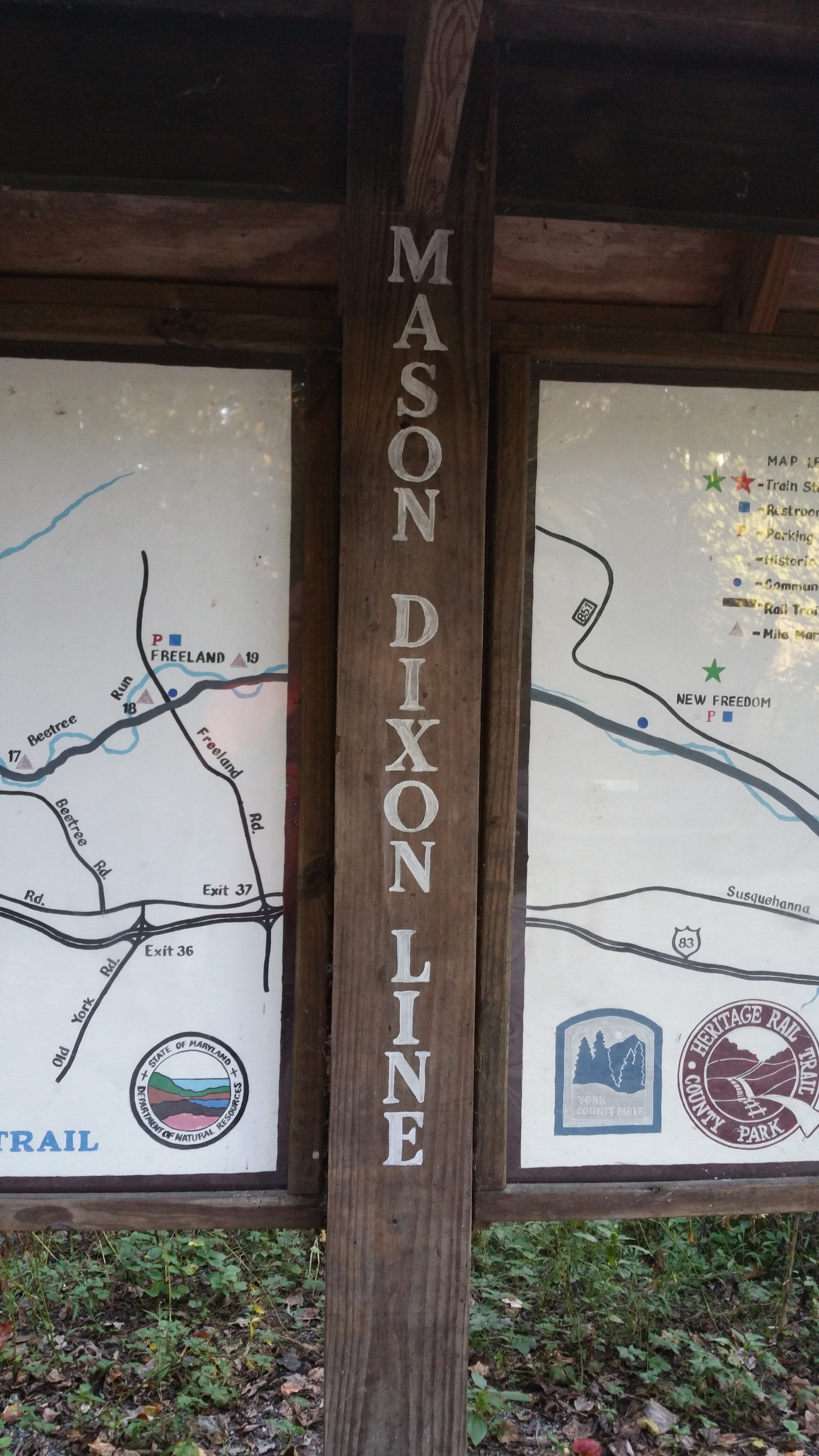
The Mason–Dixon line, where the Torrey C. Brown Rail Trail becomes the York County Heritage Trail near New Freedom, Pennsylvania

The Mason–Dixon line, sometimes referred to as Mason and Dixon's Line, is a demarcation line separating four U.S. states: Pennsylvania, Maryland, Delaware and West Virginia. It was surveyed between 1763 and 1767 by English surveyors and astronomers Charles Mason and Jeremiah Dixon as part of the resolution to Cresap's War, a border conflict involving Maryland, Pennsylvania, and Delaware (then a part of Pennsylvania) in colonial United States.

The largest portion of the Mason–Dixon line, along the southern Pennsylvania border, later became informally known as the boundary between the Southern slave states and Northern free states. This usage came to prominence during the debate around the Missouri Compromise of 1820, when drawing boundaries between slave and free territory, and resurfaced during the American Civil War, with border states also coming into play. The Confederate States of America claimed the Virginia (now West Virginia) portion of the line as part of its northern border, although it never exercised meaningful control that far north – especially after West Virginia separated from Virginia and joined the Union as a separate state in 1863. It is still used today in the figurative sense of a line that separates the Northeast and South regionally, politically, and socially.

== Background ==
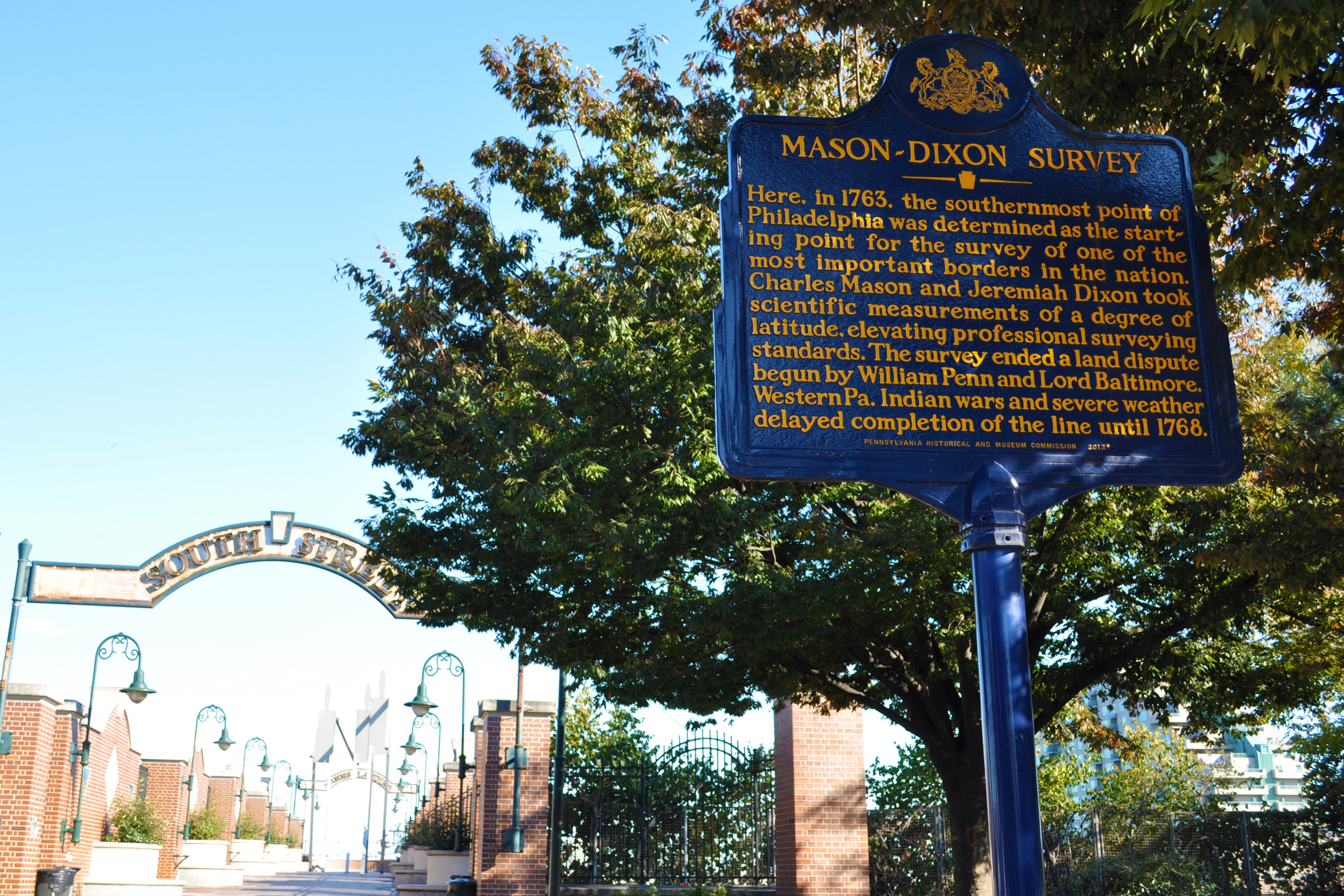
A historical marker at Front and South streets in Philadelphia, where the survey began

Maryland's charter of 1632 granted Cecil Calvert land north of the entire length of the Potomac River up to the 40th parallel. A problem arose when Charles II granted a charter for Pennsylvania in 1681. The grant defined Pennsylvania's southern border as identical to Maryland's northern border, but described it differently, as Charles relied on an inaccurate map. The terms of the grant clearly indicate that Charles II and William Penn believed the 40th parallel would intersect the Twelve-Mile Circle around New Castle, Delaware, when in fact it falls north of the original boundaries of the City of Philadelphia, the site of which Penn had already selected for his colony's capital city. Negotiations ensued after the problem was discovered in 1681. A compromise proposed by Charles II in 1682, which might have resolved the issue, was undermined by Penn receiving the additional grant of the "Three Lower Counties" along Delaware Bay, which later became the Delaware Colony, a satellite of Pennsylvania. Maryland considered these lands part of its original grant.

The conflict became more of an issue when settlement extended into the interior of the colonies. In 1732, the Proprietary Governor of Maryland, Charles Calvert, 5th Baron Baltimore, signed a provisional agreement with William Penn's sons, which drew a line somewhere in between and renounced the Calvert claim to Delaware. But later, Lord Baltimore claimed that the document he had signed did not contain the terms he had agreed to, and refused to put the agreement into effect. Beginning in the mid-1730s, violence erupted between settlers claiming various loyalties to Maryland and Pennsylvania. The border conflict would be known as Cresap's War.

Progress was made after a Court of Chancery ruling affirming the 1732 agreement, but the issue remained unresolved until Frederick Calvert, 6th Baron Baltimore ceased contesting the claims on the Maryland side and accepted the earlier agreements. Maryland's border with Delaware was to be based on the Transpeninsular Line and the Twelve-Mile Circle around New Castle. The Pennsylvania–Maryland border was defined as the line of latitude 15 miles (24 km) south of the southernmost house in Philadelphia (on what is today South Street). As part of the settlement, the Penns and Calverts commissioned the English team of Charles Mason and Jeremiah Dixon to survey the newly established boundaries between the Province of Pennsylvania, the Province of Maryland, and Delaware Colony.

In 1779, Pennsylvania and Virginia agreed "To extend Mason's and Dixon's line, due west, five degrees of longitude, to be computed from the river Delaware, for the southern boundary of Pennsylvania, and that a meridian, drawn from the western extremity thereof to the northern limit of the said state, be the western boundary of Pennsylvania for ever."

After Pennsylvania abolished slavery in 1781, the east–west part of this line and the Ohio River became a border between slave and free states, with Delaware retaining slavery until the 13th Amendment was ratified in 1865.

== Geography of the line ==
Diagram of the survey lines creating the Mason–Dixon line and The Wedge

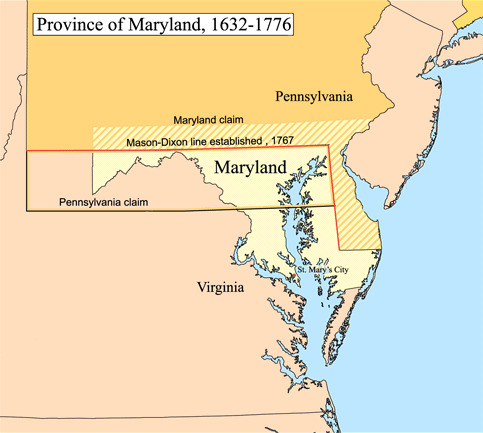
The Province of Maryland, 1632–1776

Mason and Dixon's actual survey line began to the south of Philadelphia, and extended from a benchmark east to the Delaware River and west to what was then the boundary with western Virginia.

The surveyors also fixed the boundary between Delaware and Pennsylvania and the approximately north–south portion of the boundary between Delaware and Maryland. Most of the Delaware–Pennsylvania boundary is an arc, and the Delaware–Maryland boundary does not run truly north–south because it was intended to bisect the Delmarva Peninsula rather than follow a meridian.

Mason and Dixon also confirmed the earlier survey delineating Delaware's southern boundary from the Atlantic Ocean to the "Middle Point" stone (along what is today known as the Transpeninsular Line). They proceeded nearly due north from this to the Pennsylvania border.

The Maryland–Pennsylvania boundary is an east–west line with an approximate mean latitude of 39°43′20″ N (Datum WGS 84). In reality, the east-west Mason–Dixon line is not a true straight line in the geometric sense, but is instead a polygonal chain, a series of many adjoining line segments, following a path between latitude 39°43′15″ N and 39°43′23″ N.

The surveyors also extended the boundary line 40 miles (64 km) west of Maryland's western boundary, into territory that was still in dispute between Pennsylvania and Virginia, though this was contrary to their original charter. Mason and Dixon's survey was finished on October 19, 1767, about 31 miles (50 km) east of what is now Pennsylvania's southwest corner. Where the surveyors finished their survey became known as the Mason and Dixon Survey Terminal Point.

In 1774, commissioners from Pennsylvania and Virginia met to negotiate their boundary, which at the time involved Pennsylvania's southern border west of Maryland and its entire western border. Both sides agreed that Pennsylvania's grant made its western border a tracing of the course of the Delaware River, displaced five degrees (approximately 265 miles) to the west. And both sides thought this would place Fort Pitt in Virginia territory (in fact it would not have). With that in mind, the governor of Pennsylvania argued that, despite the agreement reached with Maryland, Pennsylvania's southern border west of Maryland was still the 39th parallel, about 50 miles (80 km) south of the Mason–Dixon line. Negotiations continued for five years, with a series of proposed lines. In the end, a compromise was reached: the Mason–Dixon line would be extended west to a point five degrees west of the Delaware River. To compensate Pennsylvania for the claimed territory lost, its western boundary would be run due north rather than copying the course of the Delaware River.

The Mason–Dixon line was marked by stones every mile 1 mile (1.6 km) and "crownstones" every 5 miles (8.0 km), using stone shipped from England. The Maryland side says "(M)" and the Delaware and Pennsylvania sides say "(P)". Crownstones included both coats of arms.

Many of the original stones are still visible, resting on public land and protected by iron cages; a number have gone missing or were buried. There exists an interactive map of each currently found stone.

The actual locations of the stones may differ a few hundred feet east or west from the exact positions where Mason and Dixon intended to place them, still, the line drawn from stone to stone forms the legal boundary.

The lines have been resurveyed several times over the centuries without substantive changes to Mason's and Dixon's work, and additional benchmarks and survey markers were placed where necessary.

== History ==
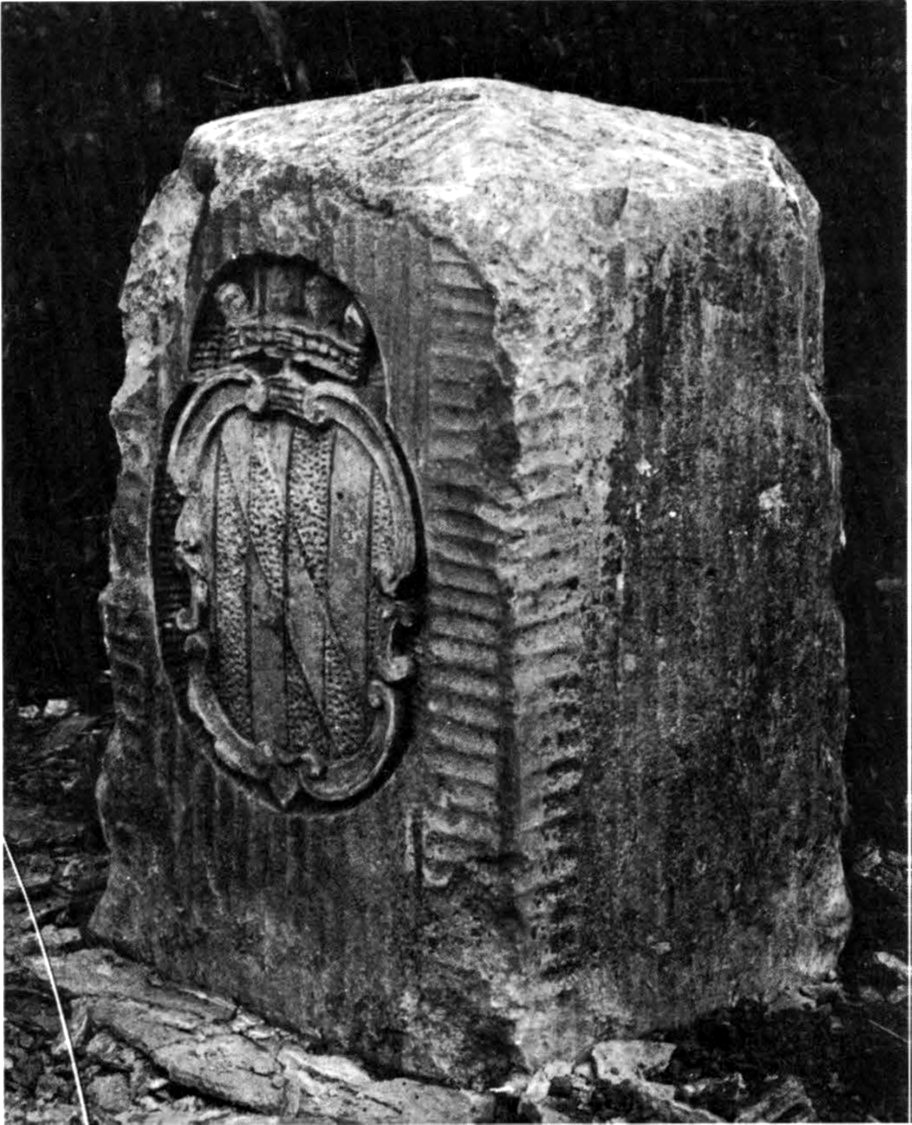
A crownstone boundary monument on the Mason–Dixon line; these markers were originally placed at every 5th mile (8.0 km) along the line, ornamented with family coats of arms facing the state they represented. The coat of arms of Maryland's founding Calvert family is shown; on the other side, are the arms of William Penn, who founded the Province of Pennsylvania

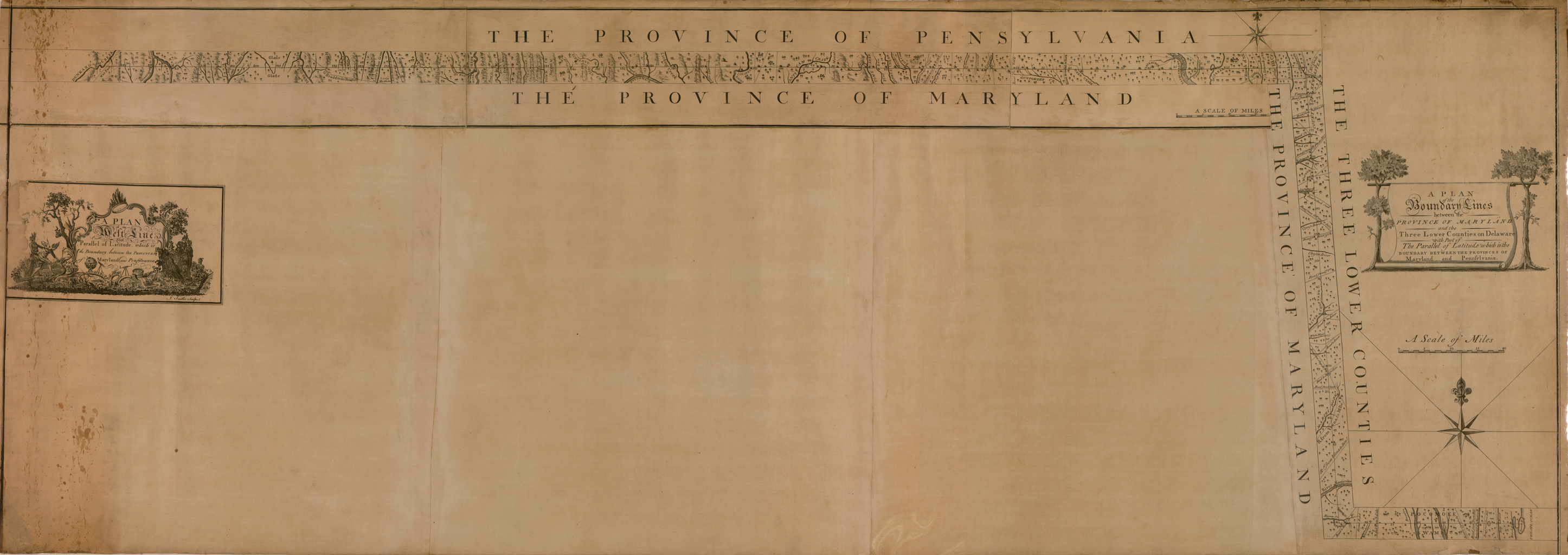
"A Plan of the West Line or Parallel of Latitude" by Charles Mason, published in 1768

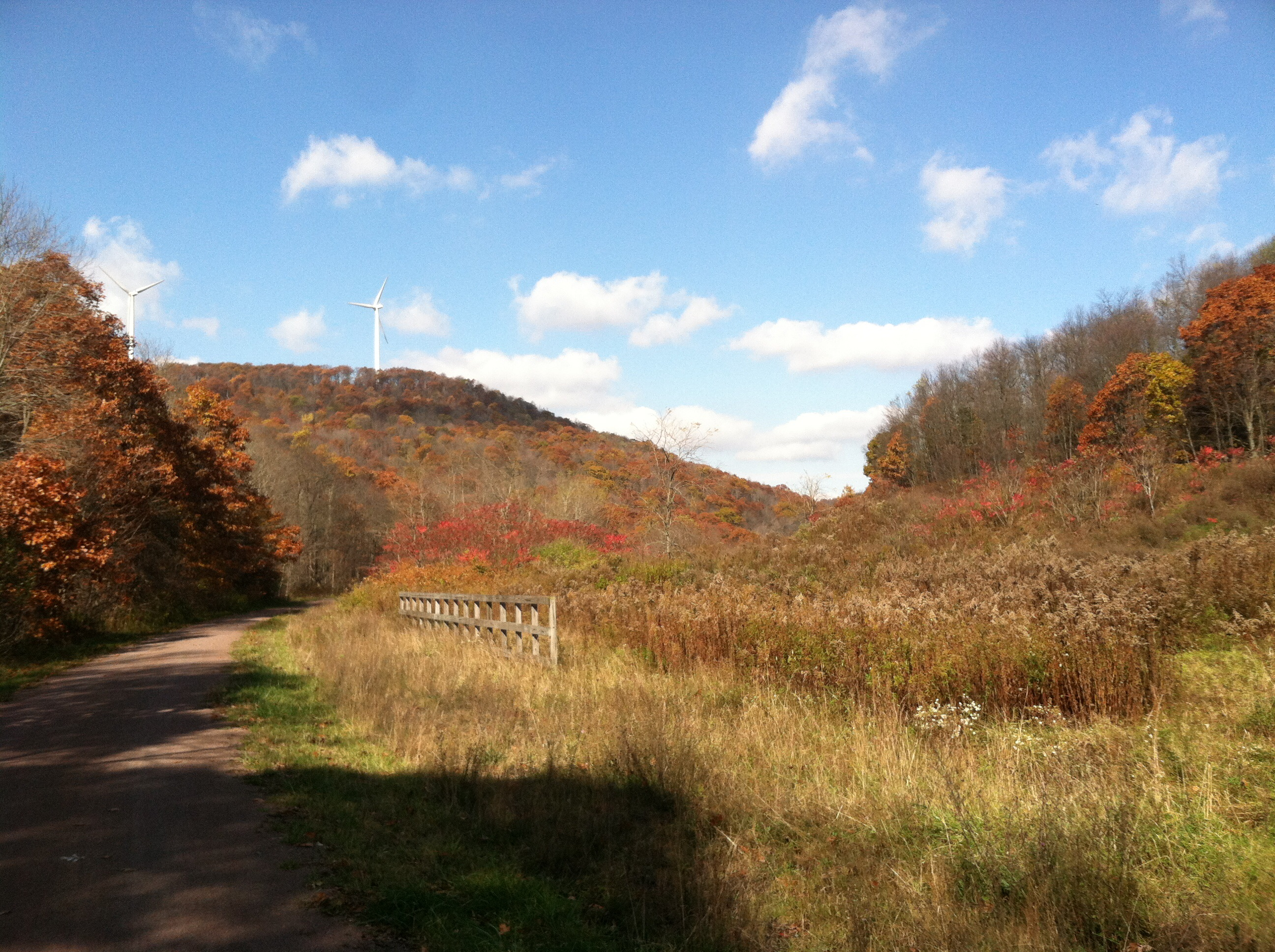
The Mason–Dixon Trail

The line was established to end a boundary dispute between the British colonies of Maryland and Pennsylvania/Delaware. Maryland had been granted the territory north of the Potomac River up to the 40th parallel. Pennsylvania's grant defined the colony's southern boundary as following a 12-mile (radius) circle (19 km) counter-clockwise from the Delaware River until it hit "the beginning of the fortieth degree of Northern latitude." From there the boundary was to follow the 40th parallel due west for five degrees of longitude. But the 40th parallel does not, in fact, intersect the 12-mile circle, instead lying significantly farther north. Thus Pennsylvania's southern boundary as defined in its charter was contradictory and unclear. The most serious problem was that the Maryland claim would put Philadelphia, the largest city in Pennsylvania, in Maryland.

The dispute was peacefully resolved in 1767 when the boundary was fixed as follows:

- Between Pennsylvania and Maryland:
  - The parallel (latitude line) 15 miles (24 km) south of the then southernmost point in Philadelphia, measured to be at about 39°43′ N and agreed upon as the Maryland–Pennsylvania line.
- Between Delaware and Maryland:
  - The existing east–west transpeninsular line from the Atlantic Ocean to the Chesapeake Bay, as far as its midpoint from the Atlantic.
  - A 12-mile (radius) circle (12 mi (19 km)) around the city of New Castle, Delaware.
  - A "tangent line" connecting the midpoint of the transpeninsular line to the western side of the 12-mile circle.
  - A "north line" along the meridian (line of longitude) from the tangent point to the Maryland-Pennsylvania border.
  - Should any land within the 12-mile circle fall west of the north line, it would remain part of Delaware. (This was indeed the case, and this border is the "arc line".)

The disputants engaged an expert British team, astronomer Charles Mason and surveyor Jeremiah Dixon, to survey what became known as the Mason–Dixon line. It cost the Calverts of Maryland and the Penns of Pennsylvania £3,512 9/ – (equivalent to £505,009 in 2025) to have 244 miles (393 km) surveyed with such accuracy. To them the money was well spent, for in a new country there was no other way of establishing ownership. The Mason–Dixon Trail stretches on or near Pennsylvania's border with Delaware and Maryland and is a popular attraction to tourists.

The Mason–Dixon line is made up of four segments corresponding to the terms of the settlement:

- the tangent line
- the north line
- the arc line
- the 39°43′ N parallel

The most difficult task was fixing the tangent line, as they had to confirm the accuracy of the transpeninsular line midpoint and the 12-mile circle, determine the tangent point along the circle, and then actually survey and monument the border. They then surveyed the north and arc lines. They did this work between 1763 and 1767. This actually left a small wedge of land in dispute between Delaware and Pennsylvania until 1921.

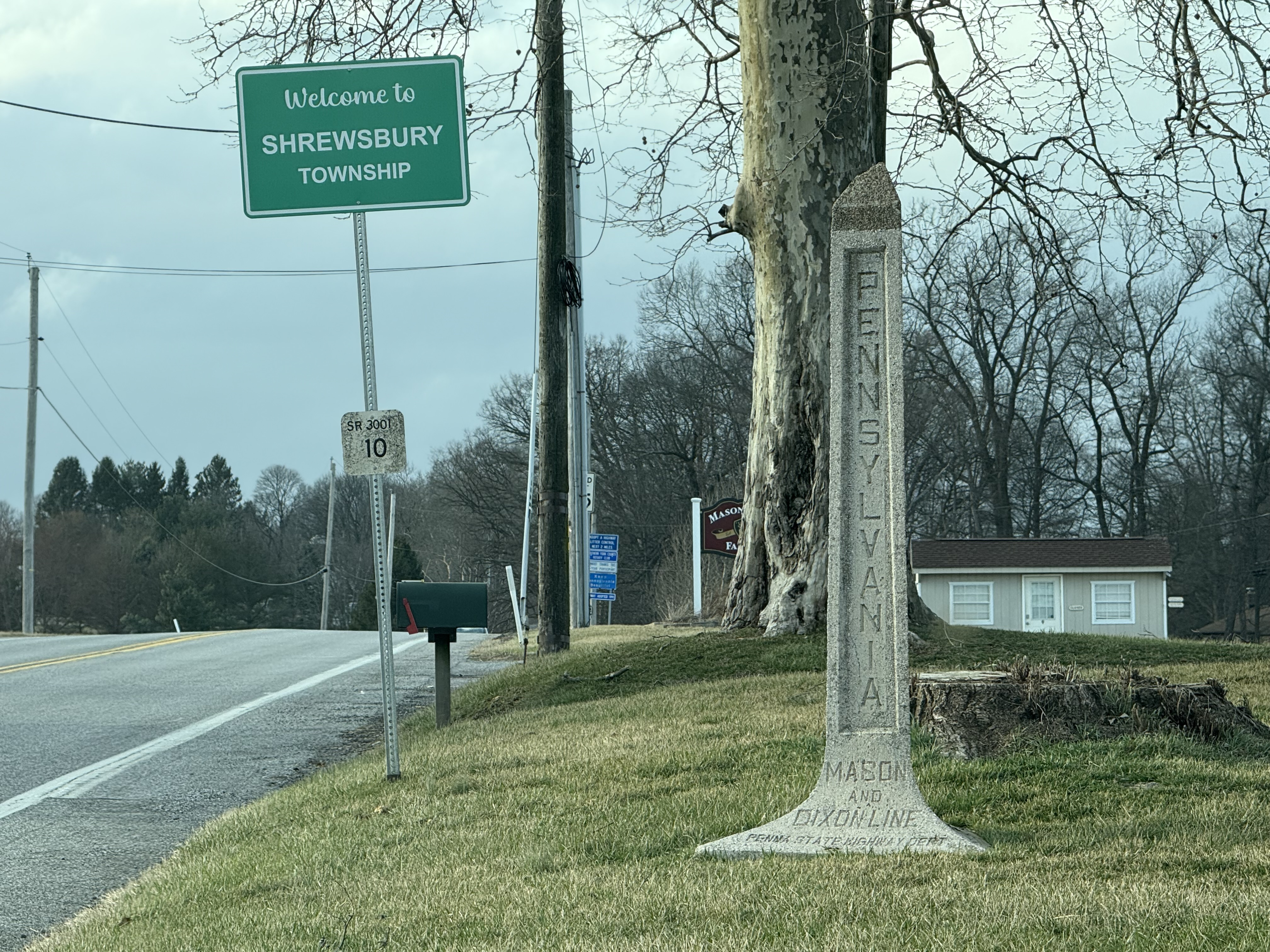
A Mason–Dixon Line boundary marker around Shrewsbury Township, York County

In April 1765, Mason and Dixon began their survey of the more famous Maryland–Pennsylvania line. They were commissioned to run it for a distance of five degrees of longitude west from the Delaware River, fixing the western boundary of Pennsylvania. However, in October 1767, at Dunkard Creek near Mount Morris, Pennsylvania, nearly 244 miles (393 km) west of the Delaware, their Iroquois guides refused to go any further, having reached the border of their lands with the Lenape, with whom they were engaged in hostilities. As a result, the group was forced to quit, and on October 11, they made their final observations, 233 miles (375 km) from their starting point.

In 1784, surveyors David Rittenhouse and Andrew Ellicott and their crew completed the survey of the Mason–Dixon line to the southwest corner of Pennsylvania, five degrees from the Delaware River. (Note: Four surveyors were appointed by each of the states: Virginia appointed Dr. James Madison, Robert Andrews, John Page, and Andrew Ellicott, Pennsylvania appointed Dr. John Ewing (provost of University of Penn.), John Lukens (surveyor general of Penn.), Thomas Hutchins, and David Rittenhouse. Andrews and Ellicott completed the west end of the line for Virginia, while Hutchins and Ewing did so for Pennsylvania.) Other surveyors continued west to the Ohio River. The section of the line between the southwestern corner of Pennsylvania and the river is the county line between Marshall and Wetzel counties, West Virginia.

As the 20th century moved along and modern roadways came to northeastern Maryland and Delaware, the old boundary line was noted by construction crews, newspaper columnists, and the traveling public. When contractors started working on a section of Route 40, a modern dual highway between Elkton and Glasgow, they discovered a time and weather battered original Mason Dixon Marker. It was relocated to north side of the highway and when the governors of Delaware and Maryland dedicated the highway on June 26, 1941, newspaper reporters took note of the ancient old relic.

Although greatly mangled by traffic in the second half of the twentieth century, it still stands today. But long before bulldozers and other heavy equipment started moving earth for the dual highway before World War II, there were concerns about the preservation of this monument. In 1885, the Cecil Democrat reported that after 119-years, the stone on the road from Elkton to Glasgow had "yielded to the action of the elements and fell over." The editor urged the Cecil County Commissioners, Commissioner of the Land Office, Governor or some public minded citizen to preserve this "old time-honored, moss-covered relic of a generation, which has passed away ... "

On November 14, 1963, during the bicentennial of the Mason–Dixon line, U.S. President John F. Kennedy opened a newly completed section of Interstate 95 where it crossed the Maryland–Delaware border. After the president, flanked by the governors of Delaware and Maryland, cut a ribbon opening the Interstate, they moved to the grassy median strip where a replica Mason and Dixon Marker had been placed for the bicentennial. There President Kennedy and the governors unveiled a limestone replica. It was one of his last public appearances before his assassination in Dallas, Texas 8 days later on the 22nd. The Delaware Turnpike and the Maryland portion of the new road were later designated as the John F. Kennedy Memorial Highway.

The Mason–Dixon line has been resurveyed three times: in 1849, 1900, and in the 1960s.

In 2020, 30 volunteers, at the behest of the Maryland Geological Survey, started a project to locate and document the 226 remaining Mason–Dixon Line stones, which were placed every mile in the 18th century to mark the border between Pennsylvania and Maryland. The stones are historically significant because they represent one of the first geodetic surveys ever conducted in North America. The volunteers hope to get the stones listed on the National Register of Historic Places, which will help to preserve them for future generations. By 2023, the volunteers found 218 of the often-hidden 500-pound limestone stone markers quarried in England.

In October 2026, Brunk Auctions in Asheville, North Carolina, put an original, hand-drawn map of the Mason-Dixon Line up for auction, with an estimated price of $800,000 to $1.2 million. Publisher Malcolm S. Forbes had bought the map for $360,000 in 1982.

== Systematic errors and experiments to weigh the Earth ==
Mason and Dixon achieved a high level of accuracy in the survey due to the work of Nevil Maskelyne, some of whose instruments they used. There was keen interest in their work and much communication between the surveyors, Maskelyne and other members of the British Scientific establishment in the Royal Society in Britain, notably Henry Cavendish.

During such survey work, it is normal to survey from point to point along the line and then survey back to the starting point, where if there were no errors the origin and re-surveyed position would coincide. Normally the return errors would be random – i.e. the return survey errors compared to the intermediate points back to the start point would be spatially randomly distributed around the start point. Mason and Dixon found that there were larger than expected systematic errors, i.e. non-random errors, that led the return survey consistently being in one direction away from the starting point.

When this information got back to the Royal Society members, Henry Cavendish realised that this may have been due to the gravitational pull of the Allegheny Mountains deflecting the theodolite plumb-bobs and spirit levels toward them to the west. Maskelyne then proposed measuring the gravitational force causing this deflection induced by the pull of a nearby mountain upon a plumb-bob in 1772 and sent Mason (who had returned to Britain) on a site survey through central England and Scotland to find a suitable location during the summer of 1773. Mason selected Schiehallion at which to conduct what became known as the Schiehallion experiment, which was carried out primarily by Maskelyne and determined the density of the Scottish mountain. Several years later Cavendish used a very sensitive torsion balance to carry out the Cavendish experiment and determine the average density of Earth.

== In culture ==
=== Name ===
It is unlikely that Mason and Dixon ever heard the phrase "Mason–Dixon line". The official report on the survey, issued in 1768, did not even mention their names. While the term was used occasionally in the decades following the survey, it came into popular use during congressional debates on the Missouri Compromise named "Mason and Dixon's line" as part of the boundary between slave territory and free territory.

=== Symbolism ===
In popular usage to people from the United States, the Mason–Dixon line symbolizes a cultural boundary between the North and the South (Dixie), and in this context the Ohio River is sometimes viewed as a western extension of the Mason–Dixon line. Originally "Mason and Dixon's Line" simply referred to the border between Pennsylvania (including "the Delaware Counties") and Maryland. However, it has been used metaphorically to describe the entire boundary between slave and free states during the 19th-century. After Pennsylvania abolished slavery, it served as a demarcation line for the legality of slavery. Technically, that demarcation did not extend beyond Pennsylvania where Virginia, Maryland, and Delaware, all slave states, lay south or east of the boundary. Also lying north and east of the boundary was New Jersey, where slavery was formally abolished in 1846, but former slaves continued to be "apprenticed" to their masters until the passage of the Thirteenth Amendment to the United States Constitution in 1865.

The Missouri Compromise line (Parallel 36°30′ north) had a much clearer geographic connection to slavery in the United States leading up to the Civil War.

=== In popular culture ===
Popular culture contains a multitude of references to the Mason–Dixon line as a general geographic division, or character names evoking it, although a minority of those specifically relate to the line itself.

==== Cartoons ====
- The line makes several appearances in the 1953 Bugs Bunny cartoon "Southern Fried Rabbit". The line separates the drought-affected North from which the "Yankee" Bugs leaves in search of carrots in the green lands of the "Dixie" South, the latter being guarded by Yosemite Sam, who thinks the Civil War is still ongoing.

==== Literature ====
- Mason & Dixon (1997) is the title of a novel by American author Thomas Pynchon. The novel meanders widely through the lives of Mason and Dixon, traditional American history, and other themes such as hollow earth theory, geomancy, deism, and – perhaps – alien abduction.

==== Music ====
- The 1918 song, "Rock-a-Bye Your Baby with a Dixie Melody", written by Jean Schwartz, Sam M. Lewis, and Joe Young, popularized by Al Jolson, includes the lyric "Just hang my cradle, Mammy mine/ Right on that Mason–Dixon Line".
- A small group of musicians from Paul Whiteman's orchestra led by C melody saxophonist Frank Trumbauer and including Bix Beiderbecke recorded two sides for Columbia on May 15, 1929, titled, "Alabammy Snow" and "What A Day!" under the pseudonym, "Mason–Dixon Orchestra". It is probable that they chose this pseudonym because the catalog number of the record would be 1861-D, 1861 being the year that the American Civil War began.
- The lyric "First to cross the Mason–Dixon line" featured in the opening verse of the song "I've Done it Again" (composers Marianne Faithfull / Barry Reynolds) on Grace Jones' 1981 album Nightclubbing.
- The 1955 song, "Hey, Porter", by Johnny Cash makes reference to the Mason–Dixon line in the line, "How much longer will it be 'til we cross that Mason–Dixon line?"
- In their 1999 song Maria, the band Rage Against the Machine refers to the "new line of Mason-Dixon" to metaphorically represent the division between the exploiter and the exploited, highlighting the commodification of labor and the harsh realities for immigrants.
- From the 2000 album Sailing to Philadelphia by British singer-songwriter and guitarist Mark Knopfler, the title track (also featuring James Taylor) is about the two English surveyors Charles Mason and Jeremiah Dixon travelling to Philadelphia to survey the Mason–Dixon line; the lyrics draw from Mason & Dixon by Thomas Pynchon, a novel about their relationship.
- Sonic Youth's "Paper Cup Exit" from the album Sonic Nurse (2004) has the line "Touch down on the new Mason–Dixon line" (sung by Lee Ranaldo)
- Dan Seals sang "Mason Dixon Line" and the song symbolically references the line.
- GZA references the Mason–Dixon Line in the closing words of his feature verse on Raekwon's song "Guillotine (Swords)" from his debut 1995 album Only Built 4 Cuban Linx.
- Tom Lehrer references the Mason–Dixon line in his song "I Wanna Go Back to Dixie".
- Lady Antebellum's eponymous album has a song "Home Is Where The Heart Is", which contains the line "It's just south of the Mason–Dixon line".
- The 1916 song "Are You from Dixie ('Cause I'm from Dixie Too)" originally recorded by Billy Murray contains the lyrics "If you're from Alabama, Tennessee, or Caroline. Any place below the Mason–Dixon line. Then you're from Dixie."
- Brad Paisley, LL Cool J, and Lee Thomas Miller's controversial 2013 song "Accidental Racist" uses the Mason–Dixon line as a metaphor for north–south, black/white, and other cultural (dysfunctional) relations: "Oh, Dixieland/The relationship between the Mason–Dixon needs some fixin'"
- David Allan Coe sings about the Mason–Dixon line in "I Still Sing the Old Songs".
- Connie Smith sings about the Mason–Dixon Line in "Cincinnati, Ohio", with lyrics by Bill Anderson.
- The 1983 song Dixieland Delight by country singer Ronnie Rogers and recorded by American country music band Alabama references the Mason–Dixon Line multiple times throughout the song.
- Mason Dixon is the name of a country music band (1979-1993).
- The 2022 song, "Before" which is included in the album Nicole, written by NIKI includes the lyric "While you stay just fine and feel alive south of the Mason–Dixon line".
- In Kathy Mattea's 1986 song "Leaving West Virginia", she is leaving her home state for California in search of success, but indicates that "I'll surely leave my heart below the Mason–Dixon line".
- The 2008 song "Ruby and Carlos" by James McMurtry from the album Just Us Kids opens with the lines "Ruby said you're getting us in of world of hurt, Down below the Mason–Dumbass line the food gets worse"
- The 1980 song "Southern Girl" by Maze featuring Frankie Beverly from the album Joy and Pain, the second verse starts "Below the Mason–Dixon line, down there where the girls are fine."
- The 2025 song "Brunette" by Tucker Wetmore, the chorus states "North side of the Mason-Dixon."
- The 2025 song "Live From the South" by Ernest, the chorus ends "Down here on the south side of that Mason-Dixon line," and refers to the area south of the line as "Dixieland," which can be an inference to the 1983 song "Dixieland Delight."

==== Sports ====
- In the regional baseball rivalry between the Boston Red Sox and New York Yankees, the theoretical border that separates population centers that are majority-Red Sox fans from majority-Yankees fans in Connecticut is sometimes called the "Munson–Nixon Line", in a (somewhat parodic) reference to the Mason–Dixon line. Credited to Steve Rushin of Sports Illustrated, the line is named for famed Yankee catcher Thurman Munson and Red Sox right fielder Trot Nixon. In the book The Nine Nations of North America, this line is mentioned (but not named) as the true marker of whether a given location in Connecticut is socially part of New England or the rust belt region the author calls The Foundry. This line has moved over the years, but it's still there.
- In the 2006 American sports drama Rocky Balboa, the antagonist portrayed by real-life professional boxer Antonio Tarver was named Mason "The Line" Dixon.

== See also ==
- West Virginia-Pennsylvania Sinclair Cornerstone
- Parallel 36°30′ north, or the Missouri Compromise line
- Collins–Valentine line, the boundary between the province of Quebec and the states of New York and Vermont
- Delaware Boundary Markers
- Penn–Calvert boundary dispute
- Mason and Dixon Survey Terminal Point
- Star Gazers' Stone
- Tofu Curtain
- 49th parallel north
- Weißwurstäquator, a similar border line in Germany between the Northern and Southern areas of the country.
