= Thomas H. Atherton =

American architect (1884–1978)

- Born: Thomas Henry Atherton Jr. January 16, 1884; Wilkes–Barre, Pennsylvania, U.S.
- Died: February 1, 1978 (aged 94); Wilkes–Barre, Pennsylvania, U.S.
- Education: Princeton University Massachusetts Institute of Technology Ecole de Beaux Arts
- Occupation: Architect
- Practice: Carrère and Hastings Townsend & Fleming; Lacy & Atherton Lacy, Atherton & Davis
- Buildings: Carlisle Armory East Stroudsburg Armory; Kingston Armory; Mansfield Armory; Milton Armory Wellsboro Armory
- Projects: Harrisburg Military Post Market Street Bridge Pennsylvania Memorial

Thomas Henry Atherton Jr. FAIA (January 16, 1884 – February 1, 1978) was an American architect and decorated World War I officer. He designed many public buildings in New York and Pennsylvania and a war memorial in France. A number of his works, including numerous National Guard armories in eastern Pennsylvania, are listed on the U.S. National Register of Historic Places.

== Early years ==
He was born in Wilkes–Barre, Pennsylvania. He was the son of Melanie Parke and Thomas Henry Atherton, an attorney. His father was born Thomas A. Henry, but changed his name to Thomas H. Atherton in 1870 by legislative enactment, to honor his maternal uncle who paid for him to attend Princeton University.

Atherton is a direct descendant of William Henry, an armorer in the French and Indian War and Revolutionary War, who served in the Continental Congress and was a member of Benjamin Franklin's American Philosophical Society. On his paternal grandmother's side, he is a direct descendant of James Atherton.

His childhood home was located on West River Street in Wilkes–Barre. He attended the Harry Hillman Academy in Wilkes–Barre. He attended Princeton University, where he won a prize in architecture and graduated with an A.B. in 1906. He also attended the Massachusetts Institute of Technology, graduating with a B.S. in 1909. While there, he was a member of the fraternity of Delta Psi (St. Anthony Hall). Next, he studied under Gabriel Héraud in Paris at École de Beaux–Arts.

== Military ==
In 1914, Atherton enlisted in the 9th Infantry as a private. He served on the Mexican Border War from 1916 to 1917. During World War I, he served as a captain in the 109th Field Artillery Regiment. For his distinguished service in the Meuse–Argonne offensive, he received the Croix de Guerre with one palm from France, the Coix de Guerre from Belgium, and the Citation Á L'Orde de l'Armee from France In 1940, he became the commander of the 109th. He was also promoted to the rank of colonel. He retired from the military in 1941.

In 1946, Atherton helped reorganize the National Guard in the Wilkes–Barre area. In 1960, he reached the rank of brigadier general of the Pennsylvania National Guard. He served in the Pennsylvania National Guard for 27 years.

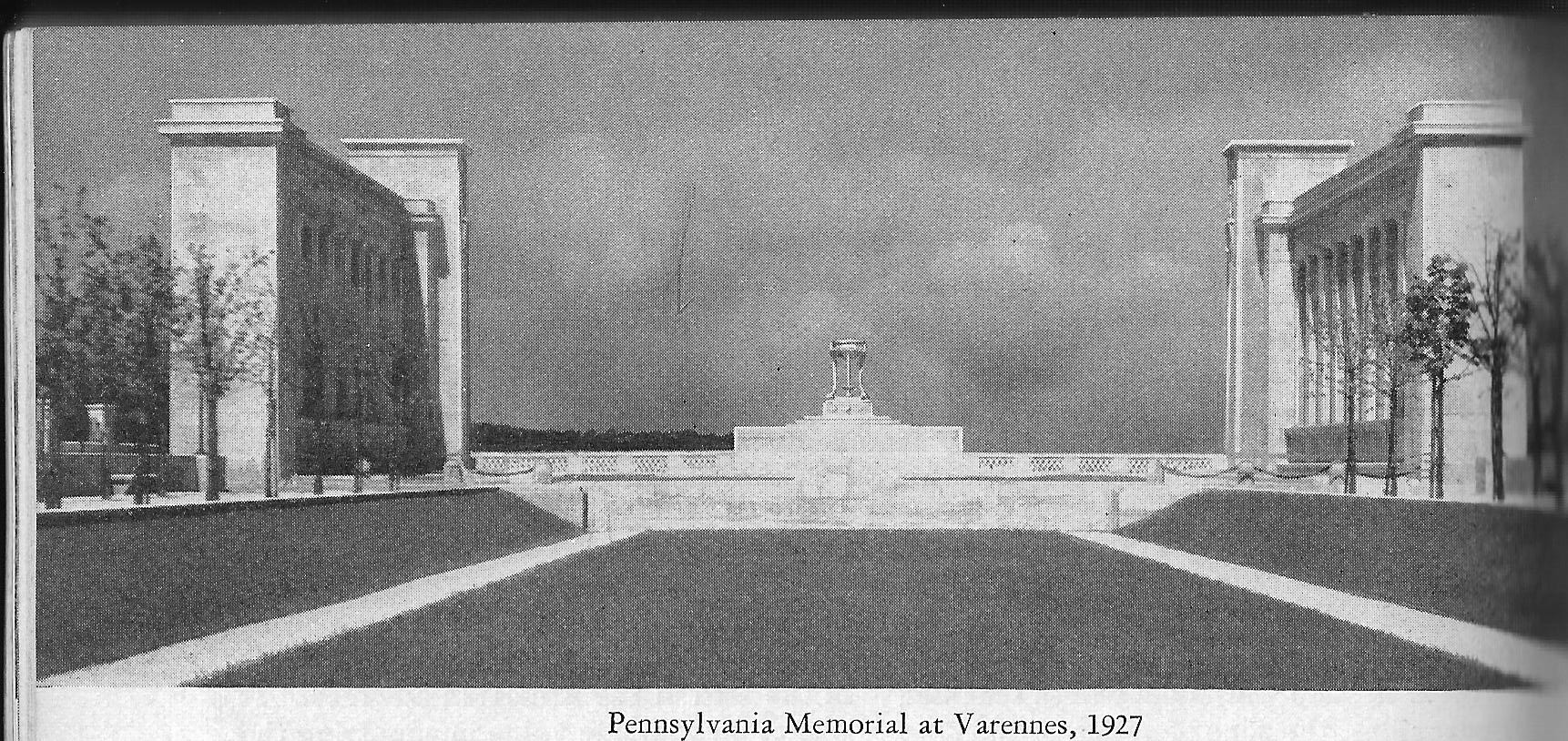
Pennsylvania Memorial, 1927

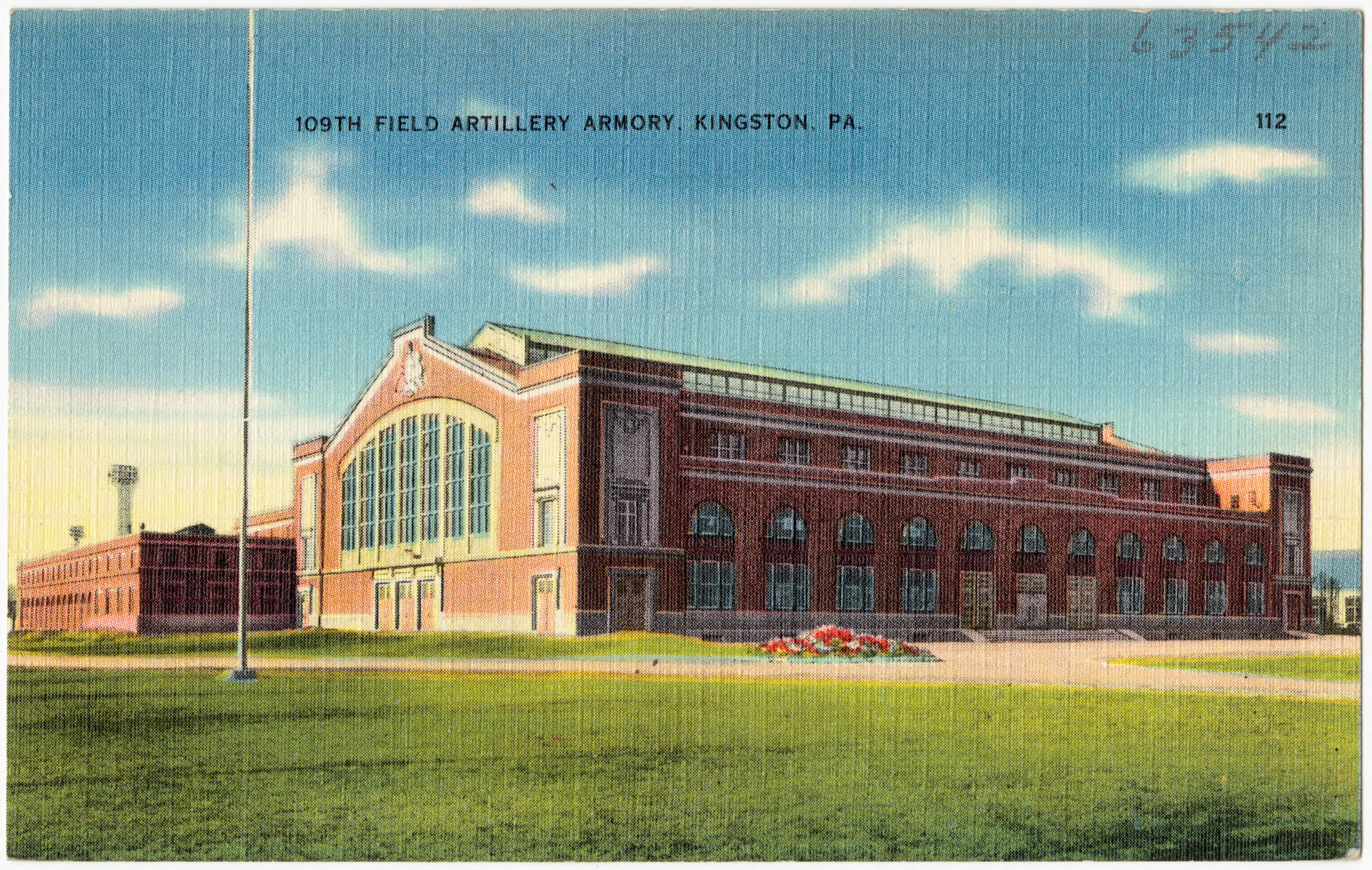
109th Field Artillery Armory

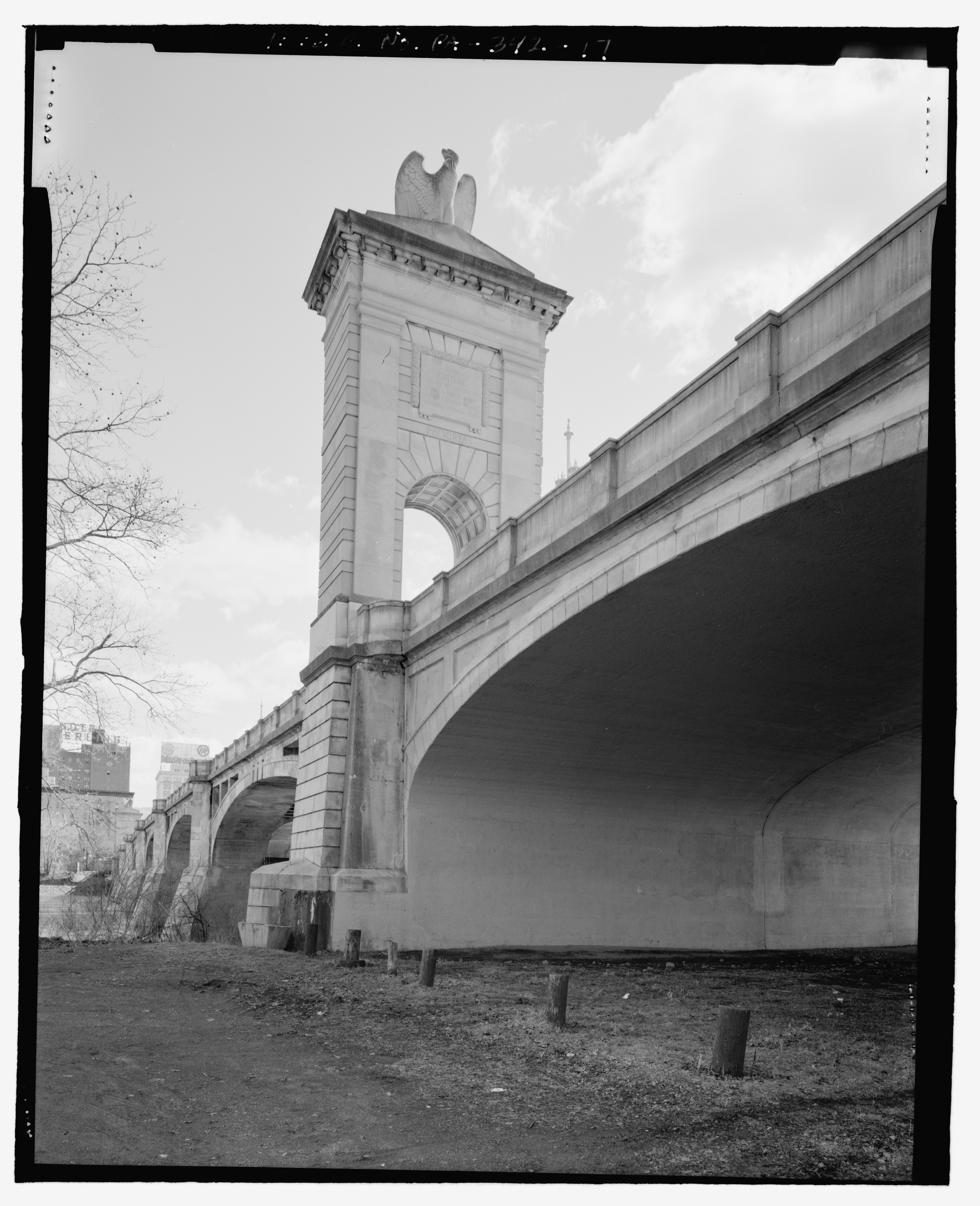
Market Street Bridge

== Career ==
From 1910 to 1911, Atherton worked in New York City as a draftsman for Carrère and Hastings. Next, he took a position at Townsend & Fleming in Buffalo, New York from 1911 to 1912.

After World War I, he returned to civilian life and worked in partnership with Philadelphia architect Paul Philippe Cret on the Pennsylvania Memorial in Varennes–en–Argonne, France. He also designed the 28th Infantry Division Memorial Shrine located in Boalsburg, Pennsylvania.

Atherton returned to Wilkes–Barre by 1922 where he had offices at 911 Coal Exchange. There, he designed the Myers Warehouses (1922), the 109th Field Artillery Armory (1923), Artillery Park (1925), the Market Street Bridge (1924–1929), and the Kirby Memorial Health Center (1929).

In 1941, he established his architectural practice in Wilkes–Barre. In 1943, Atherton expanded his solo practice into the partnership of Lacy & Atherton with L. Verne Lacy (1893-1976) In 1945, John W. Davis joined them, becoming Lacy, Atherton & Davis. Their offices were located in the Hotel Sterling Building in Wilkes–Barre. They were registered to practice in New York, North Carolina, Ohio, and Pennsylvania. He retired from the firm in 1970.

A recurring design detail in many of Atherton's residential projects, and some of his larger, non-residential projects, was the use of distinctive stone window and door surrounds. Featuring oversized lintels and sills, it usually includes an extended stone "quoin" midway between the lintel and sill. This detail, similar to one used by C.F.A Voysey, in addition to several of Atherton's early uses of roughcast stucco exteriors, leads one to believe Atherton had a knowledge and interest in Voysey's career.

== Professional affiliations ==
Atherton joined the American Institute of Architects (AIA) in 1928 and became a fellow in 1953. He was the president and secretary of the Northeastern Pennsylvania Chapter of AIA several times.

== Personal life ==
He married Mary Kidd Mish (1900–1981) in Luzerne, Pennsylvania, on February 2, 1921. Their children were, Mary Altherton, Charles Henry Atherton, and William H. Atherton. They lived in Orchard House in Wyoming, Pennsylvania.

Atherton served on the Central Registration Bureau's Advisory Committee and the Luzerne County Emergency Relief Board during the Great Depression. He was also chairman of the Luzerne County Council of Defense. In addition, he was the general campaign chair for the Community Welfare Federation, a three-term president of the Wyoming Valley Council of the Boy Scouts of America, and a member of the Wilkes–Barre Kiwanis Club.

He was interested in local and family history and was vice president of the Wyoming Historical and Geological Society, president of the Forty Fort Cemetery Association, and a member of the Jacobsburg Historical Society and the Wyoming Commemorative Association. He was a member of the American Legion, MIT Association, North Mountain Club, Princeton Alumni Association, and the St. Anthony Club of New York City. In addition, he was an elder at First Presbyterian Church in Wilke–Barre.

In 1965, he lived part-time in Hilton Head Island, South Carolina, retiring there in 1970. He moved back to Wilkes–Barre in July 1976. He died at the Veterans Administration Hospital in Wilkes–Barr in 1978 at the age of 94. He was buried in the Forty Fort Cemetery.

== Projects ==
Project	Date	Location	Status	Ref
109th Field Artillery Armory (Kingston Amory)	1923	Kingston, Pennsylvania	National Register of Historic Places	
Blackman Country House	1933	Idetown, Luzerne County, Pennsylvania		
Carlisle Armory	1931	504 Cavalry Road, Carlisle, Pennsylvania	National Register of Historic Places	
Col. Robert. Bruce Rickets estate	1913	Ganoga, Pennsylvania		
East Stroudsburg Armory	1928	271 Washington Street, East Stroudsburg, Pennsylvania	National Register of Historic Places	
First Presbyterian Church house	1932	97 South Franklin Street, Wilkes–Barre, Pennsylvania		
Harrisburg Military Post Stable 1, Building No.9	1929	14th and Calder Streets, Harrisburg, Pennsylvania	National Register of Historic Places	
Harrisburg Military Post Stables 2 and 3, Building No. 8	1930	14th and Calder Streets, Harrisburg, Pennsylvania	National Register of Historic Places	
Harrisburg Military Post Gun Shed, Building No. 4	1930	14th and Calder Streets, Harrisburg, Pennsylvania	National Register of Historic Places	
Harrisburg Military Post Stable 4, Building No. 7	1932	14th and Calder Streets, Harrisburg, Pennsylvania	National Register of Historic Places	
Harrisburg Military Post Warehouse, Building No. 3	1933	14th and Calder Streets, Harrisburg, Pennsylvania	National Register of Historic Places	
Italian Church	1922	Pittston, Pennsylvania		
Kingston Armory	1923	280 Market Street, Luzerne County, Pennsylvania	National Register of Historic Places	
Kirby Memorial Health Center	1929	Wilkes–Barre, Pennsylvania		
Mansfield Armory	1938	Smythe Park, Mansfield, Pennsylvania	National Register of Historic Places	
Market Street Bridge	1929	Wilkes–Barre, Pennsylvania	National Register of Historic Places	
Milton Armory	1922	133 Ridge Avenue Milton, Pennsylvania	National Register of Historic Places	
Myers Estate Warehouses	1922	Wilkes-Barre, Pennsylvania		
Pennsylvania Memorial	1927	Varennes-en-Argonne, France		
Pennsylvania State Hospital fire alarm and safety upgrades	1938	Nanticoke, Pennsylvania		
Pennsylvania State Hospital nurses' home	1937	Nanticoke, Pennsylvania		
Thaddeus Stevens School gymnasium and boiler house	1937	Lancaster Township, Butler County, Pennsylvania		
Wellsboro Armory	1932	2 Central Avenue, Wellsboro, Pennsylvania	National Register of Historic Places	
Wyoming Seminary Boys Dorm	1952	Kingston, Pennsylvania	National Register of Historic Places	
