= Charles Atherton =

Charles Atherton may refer to:

- Charles Atherton (civil engineer) (1805–1875), British civil engineer
- Charles G. Atherton (1804–1853), Democratic representative and senator from New Hampshire
- Charles Henry Atherton (1932–2005), American architect and secretary of the U.S. Commission of Fine Arts, 1960–2004
- Charles Humphrey Atherton (1773–1853), American lawyer, banker and politician from New Hampshire
- Charlie Atherton (Charles Morgan Herbert Atherton, 1874–1935), Major League Baseball third baseman
