= Carlisle Armory =

Carlisle Armory may refer to:

- Carlisle Armory (Carlisle, Kentucky), listed on the National Register of Historic Places in Nicholas County, Kentucky
- Carlisle Armory (Carlisle, Pennsylvania), listed on the National Register of Historic Places in Cumberland County, Pennsylvania
