= Sunbury Armory =

- U.S. National Register of Historic Places
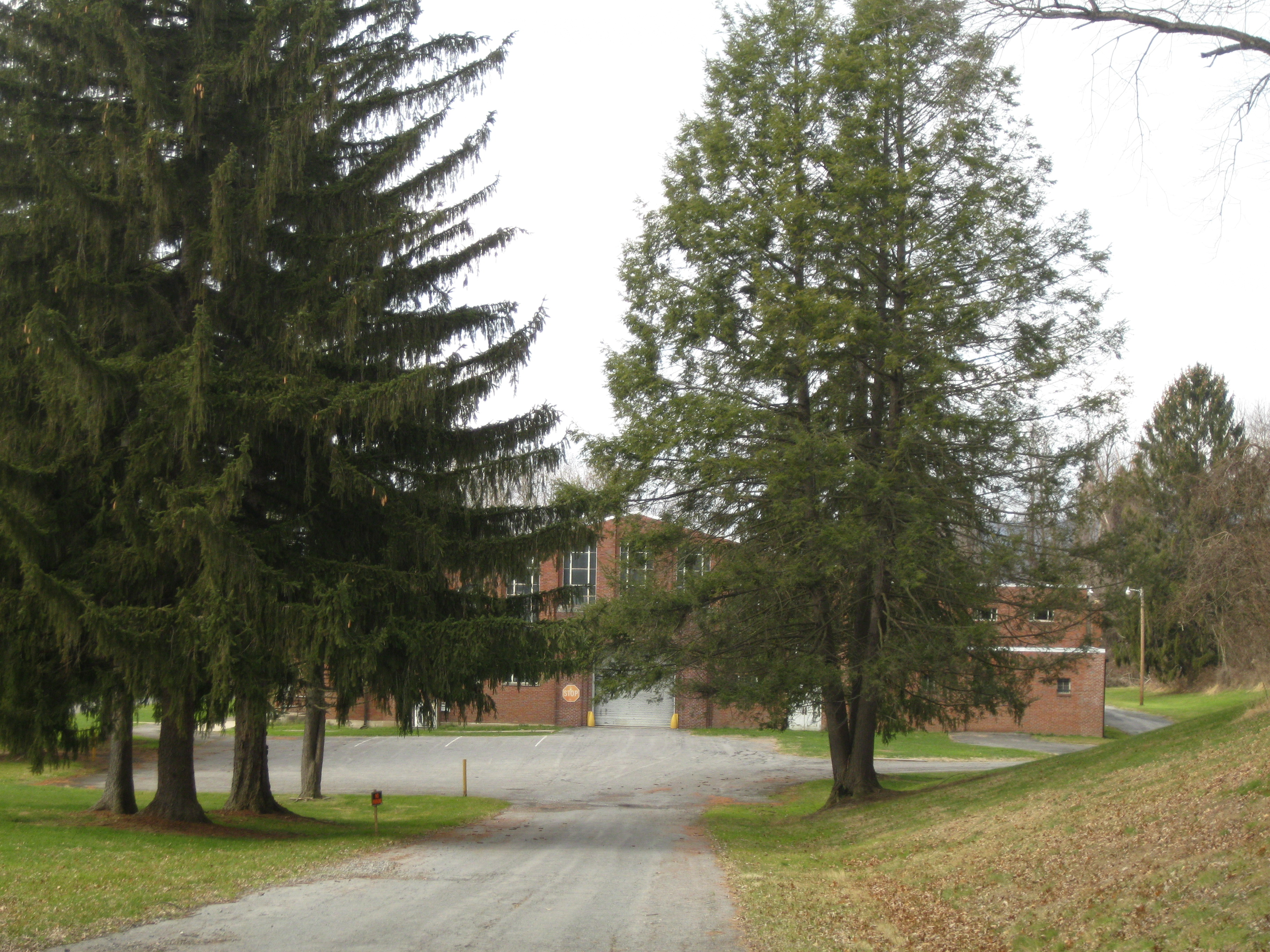
- The armory in 2012

- Location within Pennsylvania Location within the United States
- Location: Catawissa Ave., near Sunbury, Upper Augusta Township, Pennsylvania
- Coordinates: 40°52′22″N 76°46′40″W
- Area: 9.5 acres (3.8 ha)
- Built: 1938
- Architect: Davis & Rice
- Architectural style: Moderne
- MPS: Pennsylvania National Guard Armories MPS
- NRHP reference No.: 89002082
- Added to NRHP: December 22, 1989

Sunbury Armory is a historic National Guard armory located near Sunbury, in Upper Augusta Township, Northumberland County, Pennsylvania. It was built in 1938, and is a two-story, "I"-plan building consisting of an administration section, stable, and drill hall. It is constructed of concrete block with a brick veneer and executed in the Moderne style.

It was added to the National Register of Historic Places in 1989.

== See also ==
- Milton Armory: also NRHP-listed in Northumberland County
- National Register of Historic Places listings in Northumberland County, Pennsylvania
