= New Covenant Academy =

Christian school in Pennsylvania, United States

Coordinates: 41.81512°N 77.07408°W

Location
- 310 Extension Street; Mansfield, Tioga County, Pennsylvania; United States

Information
- School type: Private school
- Religious affiliation: Christianity
- Established: 1979; 47 years ago
- Interim Principal: Brian Barden
- Grades: Pre-Kindergarten - Grade 12
- Website: www.ncalions.org

New Covenant Academy (NCA) is a private Christian school for pre-Kindergarten to 12th grade. It is located in Mansfield, Pennsylvania at 310 Extension Street, Mansfield, PA 16933. Brian Barden is the interim principal.

The school was established in 1979, originally located in the building of the East West Karate school in downtown Mansfield. Its first headmaster was Brian Barden. The mission is "to provide Christ-centered academic excellence."

== Academics ==
New Covenant Academy offers education Pre-K through 12th grade. These classes are split into 3 main categories: elementary, middle school, and high school. Elementary includes grades Pre-K through 5th grade. Middle school includes 6th and 7th; high school includes grades 8th through 12th.

New Covenant Academy has an Extended Learning Center (ELC) for students who need extra help. The ELC is designed to be an extension of a child's regular classroom. NCA has core subjects such as history, science, math, bible, and English classes. Students also take art, music, and P.E. and in high school they also take Spanish (levels I, II, and III in high school) and computers. The high school is run on a modified block schedule. 1st through 3rd blocks are before lunch, while the remaining two are after lunch. Chapels, in which guest speakers provide an encouraging Christian message, are Mondays. NCA has many electives including STEM, drama, home economics, yearbook, and cooking.

== Athletics ==
New Covenant Academy has offered a variety of sports. Current sports include soccer, basketball and volleyball.

NCA plays in a New York League for most of their athletics. If numbers allow, both JV and Varsity teams are available in soccer and basketball with only Varsity teams for volleyball. Athletic teams are open to all students in Grades 6-12.

== Clubs and activities ==
Clubs and extracurricular activities vary from year to year; permanent ones include worship team, student council, and yearbook.
