= Milton Armory =

- U.S. National Register of Historic Places
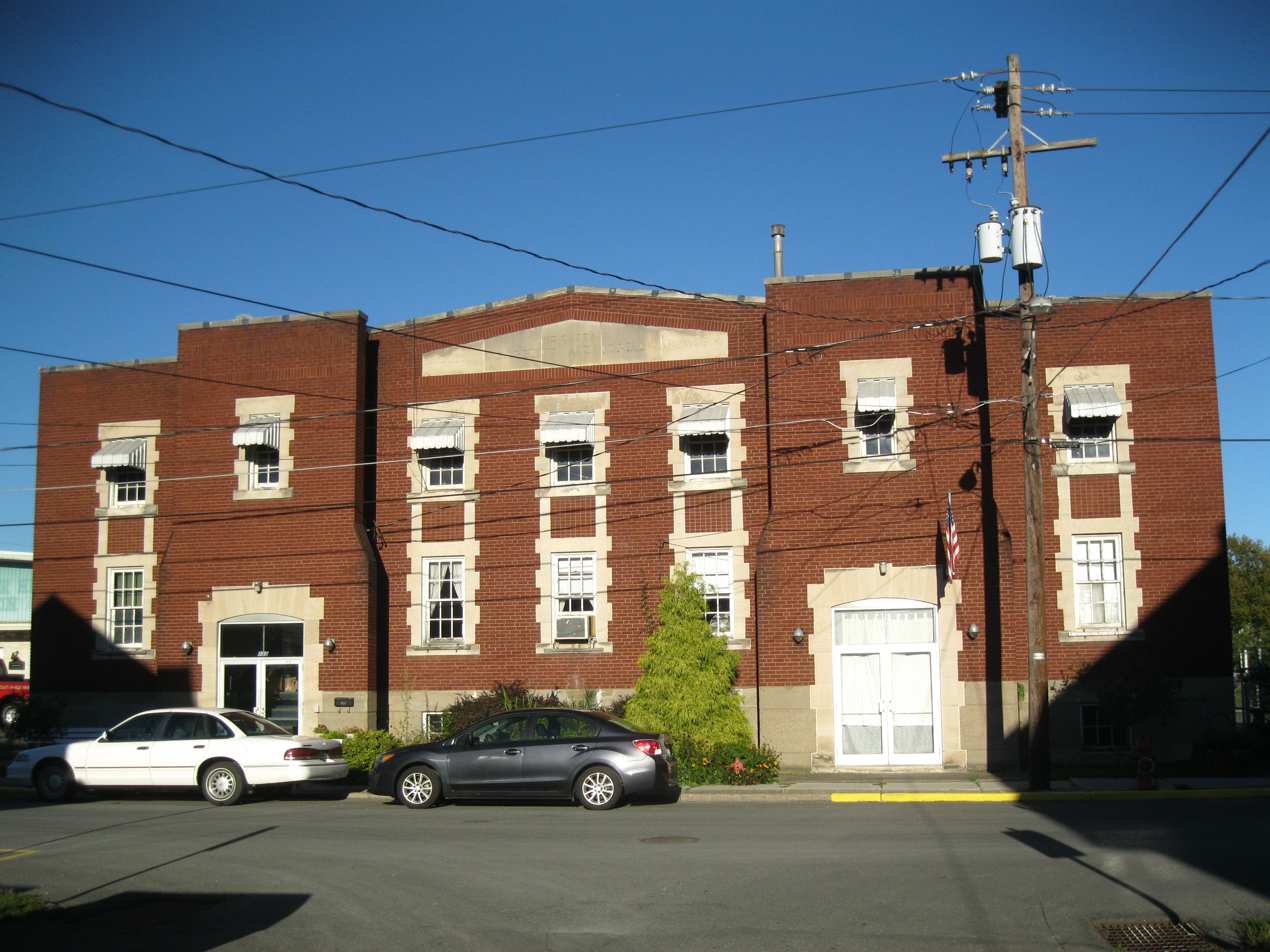
- The former armory in August 2013

- Location within Pennsylvania Location within the United States
- Location: 133 Ridge Ave., Milton, Pennsylvania
- Coordinates: 41°1′1″N 76°50′58″W
- Area: 0.5 acres (0.20 ha)
- Built: 1922, 1930
- Architect: Wilkins, W.G., Co.; Thomas H. Atherton
- Architectural style: Tudor Revival
- MPS: Pennsylvania National Guard Armories MPS
- NRHP reference No.: 91000905
- Added to NRHP: July 12, 1991

Milton Armory is a historic National Guard armory located at Milton, Northumberland County, Pennsylvania. It was designed by W.G. Wilkins Co. It was built in 1922 and expanded in 1930. It is a "T"-plan building consisting of a two-story administration building with a one-story drill hall executed in the Tudor Revival style. It is constructed of brick and sits on a concrete foundation. It features stone window and door surrounds.

It was added to the National Register of Historic Places in 1991.

== See also ==
- Sunbury Armory: also NRHP-listed in Northumberland County
- National Register of Historic Places listings in Northumberland County, Pennsylvania
