= East Stroudsburg Armory =

- U.S. National Register of Historic Places
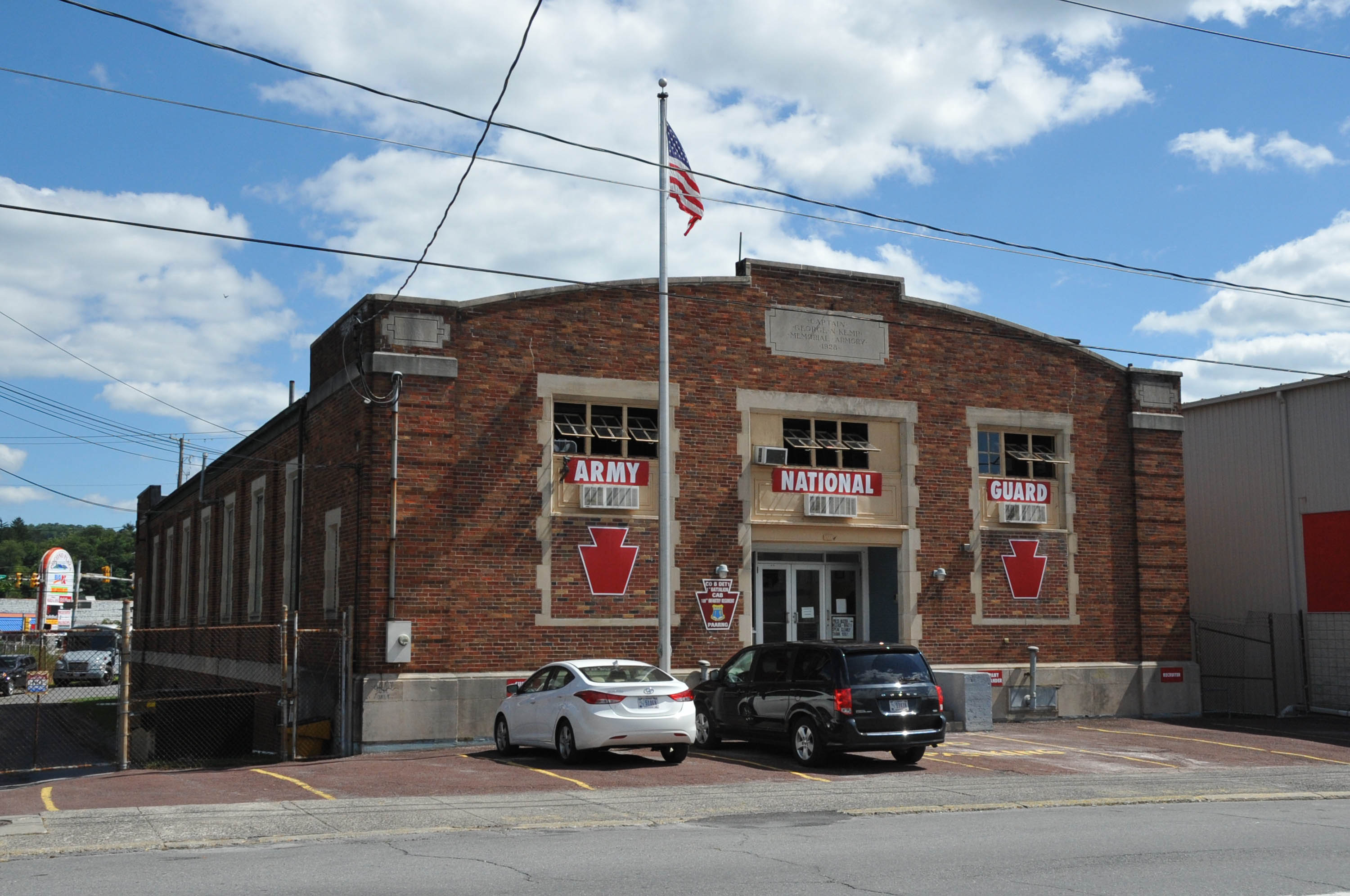
- East Stroudsburg Armory in February 2008

- Location within Pennsylvania Location within the United States
- Location: 271 Washington St., East Stroudsburg, Pennsylvania, U.S.
- Coordinates: 40°59′35″N 75°11′8″W
- Area: 0.6 acres (0.24 ha)
- Built: 1928
- Architect: Thomas H. Atherton; Horace H. Hiller
- Architectural style: Tudor Revival
- Website: www.thearmoryevents.com
- MPS: Pennsylvania National Guard Armories MPS
- NRHP reference No.: 91000510
- Added to NRHP: May 9, 1991

East Stroudsburg Armory, also known as the Captain George M. Kemp Memorial Armory, is a historic National Guard armory located at East Stroudsburg, Pennsylvania. It was built in 1928, and is a "T"-plan building consisting of a two-story administration building and attached one-story drill hall executed in the Tudor Revival style.

The armory is constructed of brick and sits on a concrete foundation. It measures approximately 56 feet by 128 feet.

It was added to the National Register of Historic Places in 1991.
