= Mansfield Armory =

- U.S. National Register of Historic Places
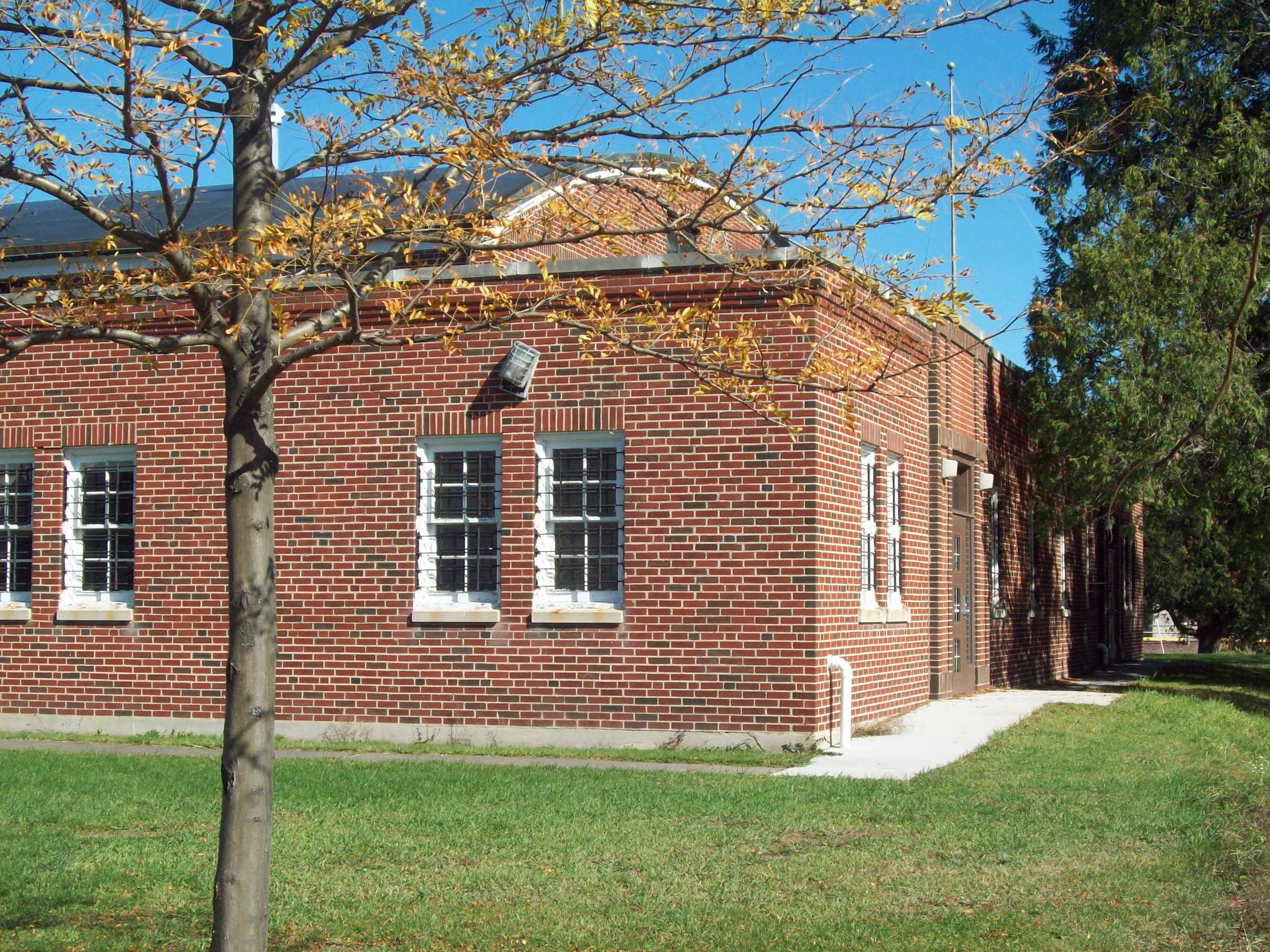
- Mansfield Armory, October 2009

- Location within Pennsylvania Location within the United States
- Interactive map showing the location of Mansfield Armory
- Location: Smythe Park, Mansfield, Pennsylvania
- Coordinates: 41°48′23″N 77°4′46″W
- Area: less than one acre
- Built: 1938
- Architect: Thomas H. Atherton
- MPS: Pennsylvania National Guard Armories MPS
- NRHP reference No.: 91000515
- Added to NRHP: May 09, 1991

Mansfield Armory, is a historic National Guard armory located in Mansfield, Pennsylvania, in Tioga County. It was built in 1938-1939 for the 108th Ambulance Company, 103rd Medical Regiment of the Pennsylvania National Guard. The utilitarian brick, 94-by-104-foot (29 by 32 m) building has a center drill hall rising above the surrounding one story section.

It was listed on the National Register of Historic Places in 1991.

== See also ==
- National Register of Historic Places listings in Tioga County, Pennsylvania
