= Arboretum de Varennes-en-Argonne =

Arboretum in Meuse, Lorraine, France

Coordinates: 49.23°N 5.03°E

The Arboretum de Varennes-en-Argonne (2.5 hectares) is a municipal arboretum located in Varennes-en-Argonne, Meuse, Lorraine, France. It is jointly managed by the town and the Office National des Forêts, contains 40 types of trees, and is open daily without charge.

== See also ==
- List of botanical gardens in France
