= Kingston Armory =

- U.S. National Register of Historic Places
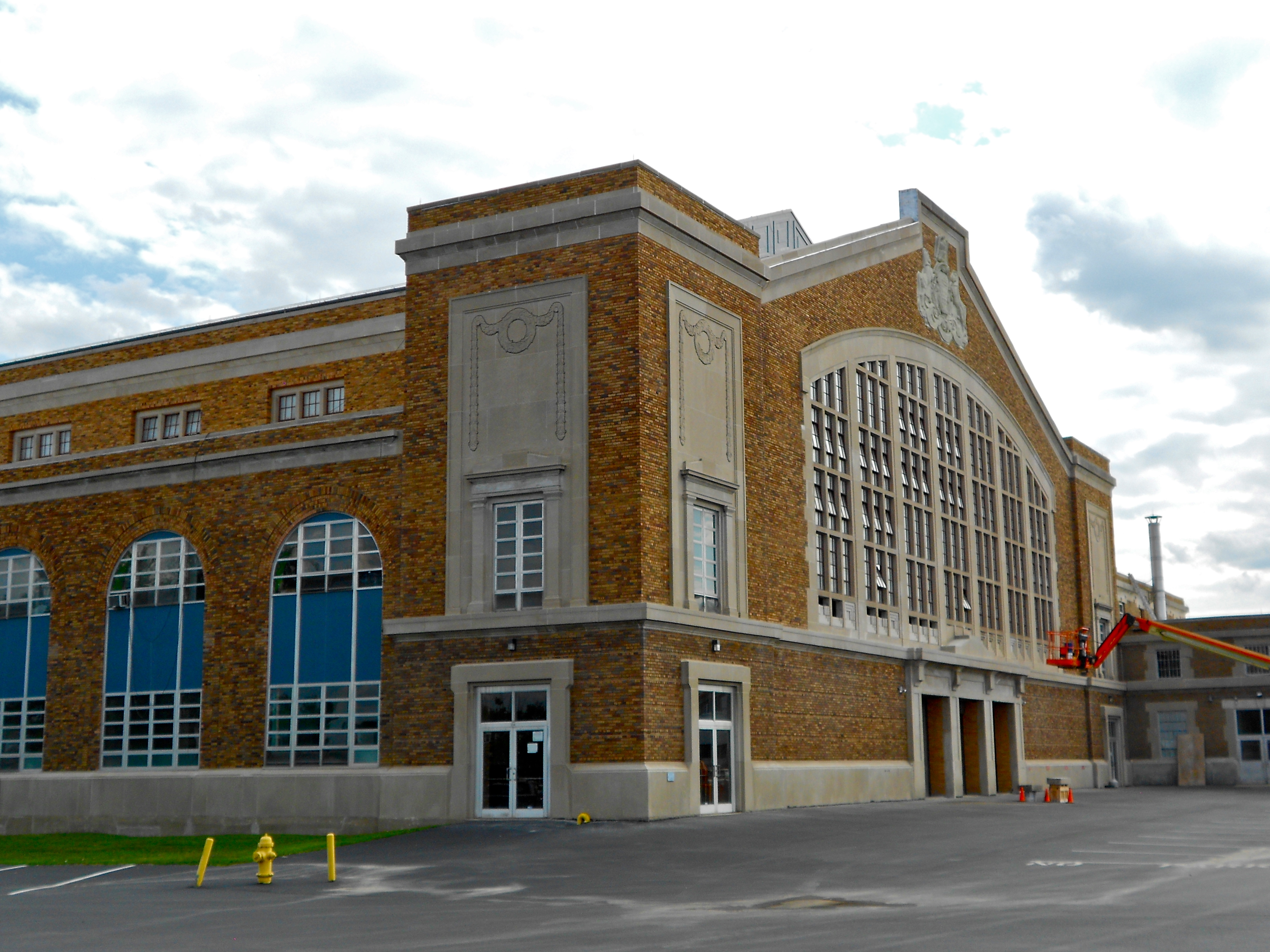
- View of the northwest corner

- Location within Pennsylvania Location within the United States
- Location: 280 Market St., Wilkes-Barre, Pennsylvania
- Coordinates: 41°15′10″N 75°53′31″W
- Area: 12 acres (4.9 ha)
- Built: 1923
- Architect: Thomas H. Atherton
- Architectural style: Classical Revival
- MPS: Pennsylvania National Guard Armories MPS
- NRHP reference No.: 89002084
- Added to NRHP: 21 December 1989

The Kingston Armory is an historic National Guard armory that is located in Wilkes-Barre, Luzerne County, Pennsylvania.

It was added to the National Register of Historic Places in 1989.

== History ==
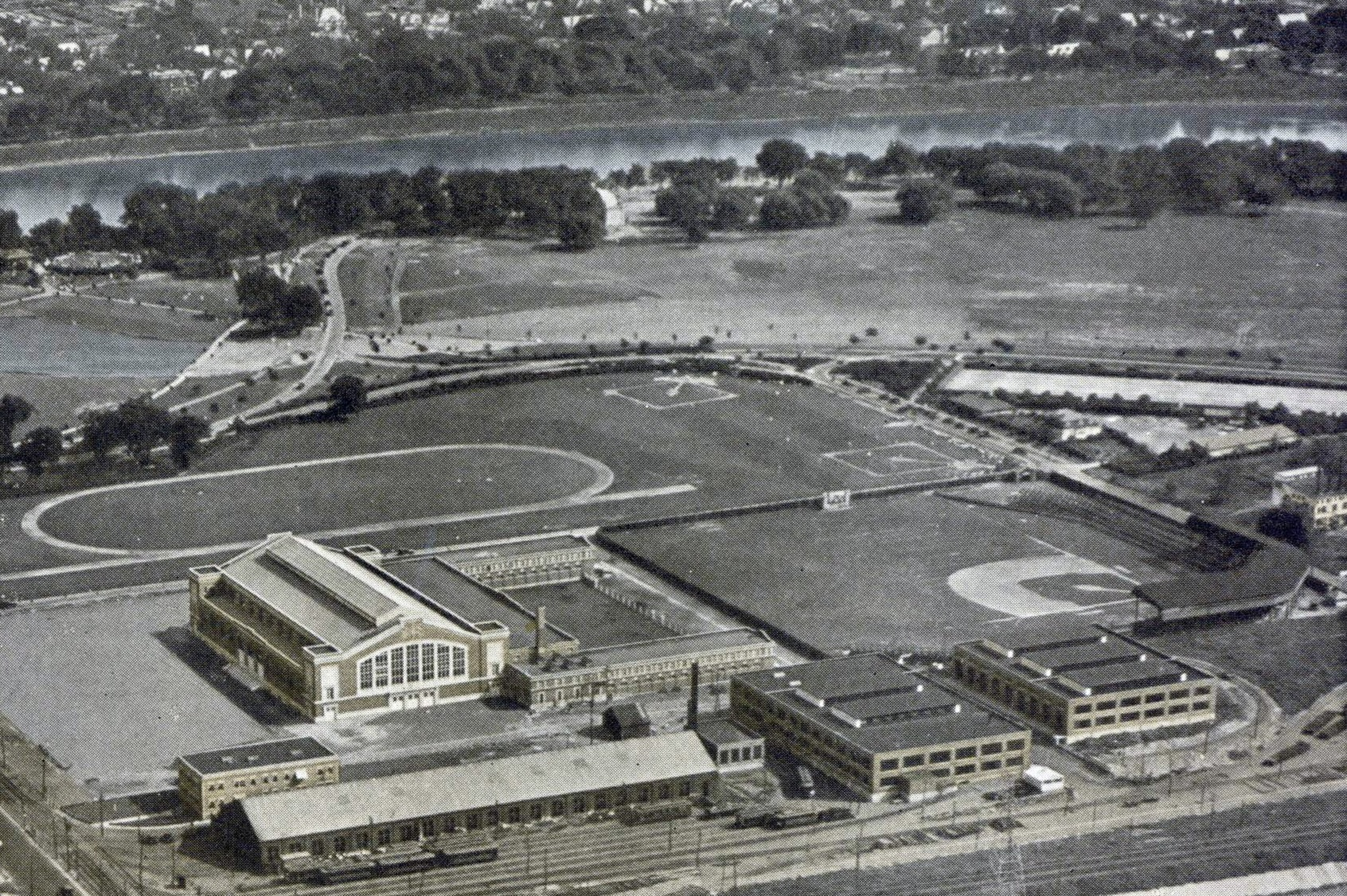
Kingston Armory and Armory Park in 1929

Built in 1923, this historic structure is a three-story, U-shaped, yellow brick building that was designed in the Classical Revival style. It measures thirteen bays by twenty bays, and includes a drill hall, classrooms, offices, storage, and stable areas.

Artillery Park was constructed adjacent to the Armory and opened in May 1925 and was the home to Wiles-Barre minor league baseball until 1955. The ballpark was also designed by architect Thomas Atherton. The Armory continues in the present day to stand beyond Artillery Park's left field wall.

On September 11, 1950, thirty-three guardsmen from the 109th Field Artillery Regiment were killed in a train accident near Coshocton, Ohio. Over the following days, the dead were moved to the Kingston Armory. Once there, the 109th Field Artillery Battalion relinquished the remains of their fellow soldiers to their families.

=== Present day ===
The Armory has been and—as of April 2023—continues to be used as a venue for a variety of events, including concerts, Irem Shrine Circuses, the annual Luzerne County Folk Festival, and specialty shows.

Concerts have included Simon & Garfunkel (April 1967) and Jefferson Airplane (November 1970). Source: Wilkes-Barre Times Leader.

== Gallery ==
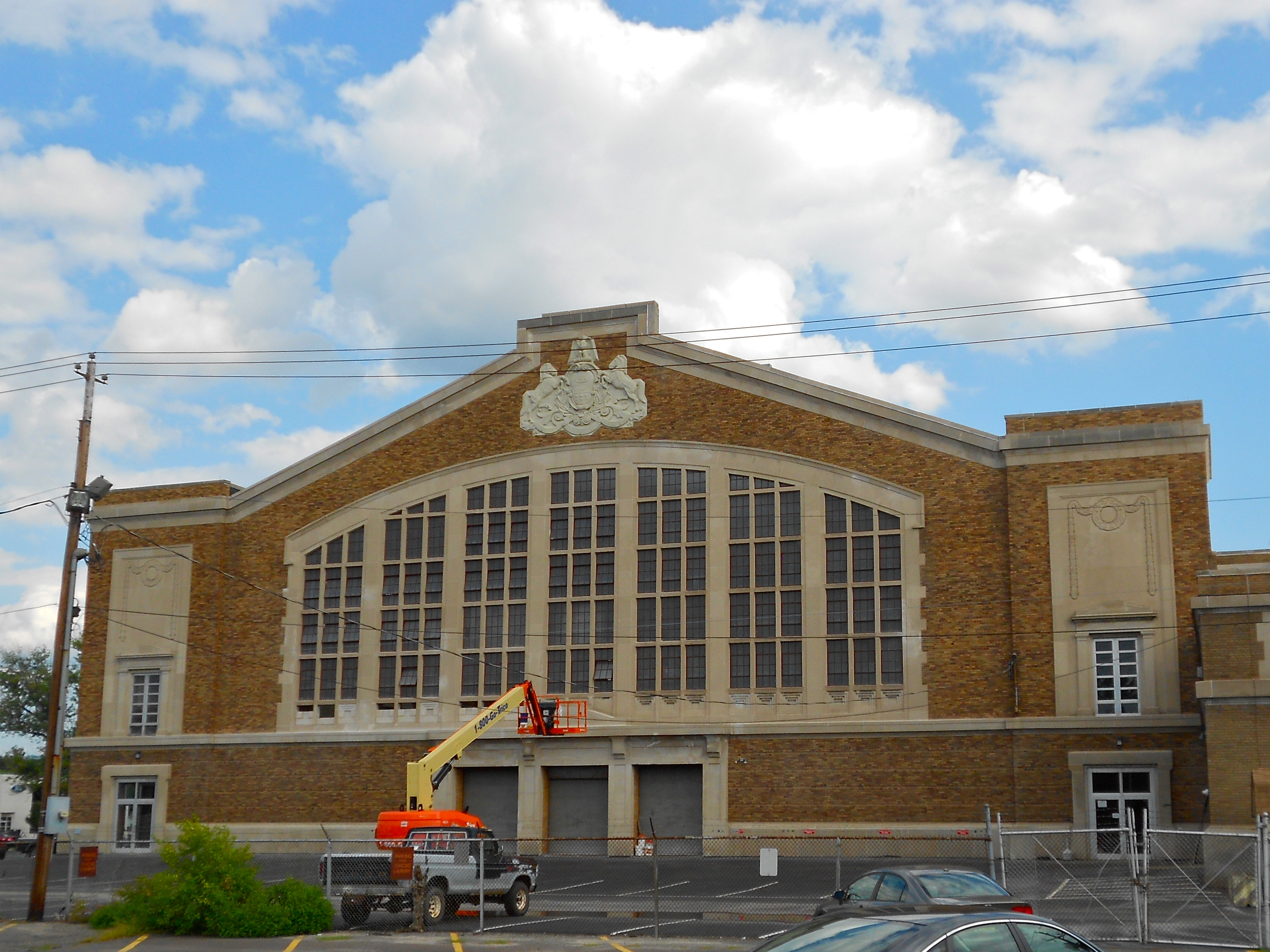
West facade

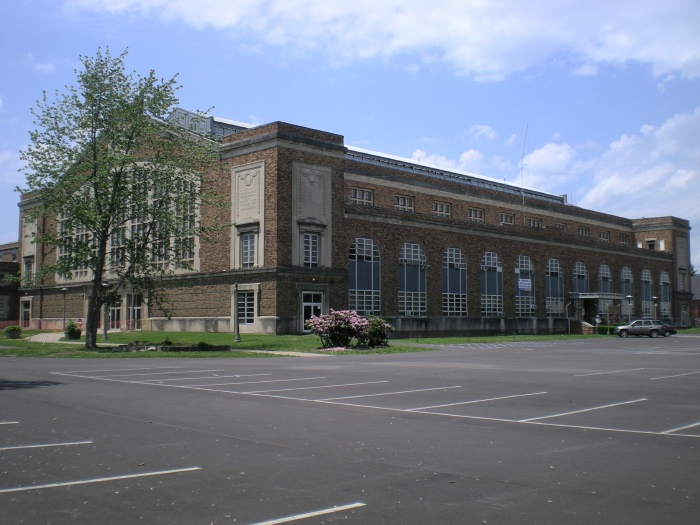
Northeast corner
