= Charles Henry Atherton =

American architect

Charles Henry Atherton (June 24, 1932 – December 3, 2005), FAIA, was an American architect and former secretary of the U.S. Commission of Fine Arts from 1960 to 2004.

== Early life ==
Atherton was born in Wilkes-Barre, Pennsylvania, on June 24, 1932, the son of Brigadier General Thomas Henry Atherton (1884–1978) and Mary Kidd Mish (1900–1981). His father was an accomplished architect whose notable works included the Pennsylvania Memorial in Varennes-en-Argonne in France.

Atherton was educated at Princeton University, receiving both an undergraduate degree in architecture in 1954 and a Master of Fine Arts in architecture in 1957.

== Career ==
After graduation he served in the U.S. Naval Civil Engineering Corps and worked as an architect for the Central Intelligence Agency for three years.

He joined the United States Commission of Fine Arts (CFA) in 1960 as Assistant Secretary and was named Secretary in 1965 after Linton Wilson’s retirement. By 1987 he was referred to in the New York Times as Executive Secretary of the CFA, a role he held until he retired on May 24, 2004.

Among the many architectural projects he worked on were the Franklin Delano Roosevelt Memorial, Lafayette Square, Washington, D.C. (opposite the White House, and the World War II Memorial, Washington, D.C.

He was a lead contributor of the CFA publication titled “Massachusetts Avenue Architecture Vol. 1, NW Washington D.C.”

== Memberships ==
Atherton was involved in numerous organizations, including the Parks and History Association, the Navy Art Foundation, the Historical Society of Washington, D.C., the Columbia Historical Society, and the National Endowment for the Arts; he served as the president of the Washington, D.C., chapter of the American Institute of Architects.

== Honors ==
- Centennial Award of the D.C. chapter of the American Institute of Architects (1993)
- The District of Columbia Mayor’s Award for Excellence in Historic Preservation (2004)
- a Committee of 100 Lifetime Achievement Award
- Fellow of the American Institute of Architects for outstanding achievement (1984)
- American Institute of Architects “Thomas Jefferson Award for Public Architecture” (2005)

There have been numerous memorial lectures held in his honor.

== Personal life ==
He married Mary Bringhurst-Davis (1939-1993) in 1967. They had two sons and a daughter.

== Death ==
He died on December 3, 2005, at the age of 73, as a result of injuries sustained when he was hit by a moving vehicle, while crossing Connecticut Avenue, Washington, D.C., near his home. His funeral was held in Washington National Cathedral. He was buried at Forty Fort Cemetery, Luzerne County, Pennsylvania.
