= Pennsylvania Memorial =

- Pennsylvania Monuments Commission
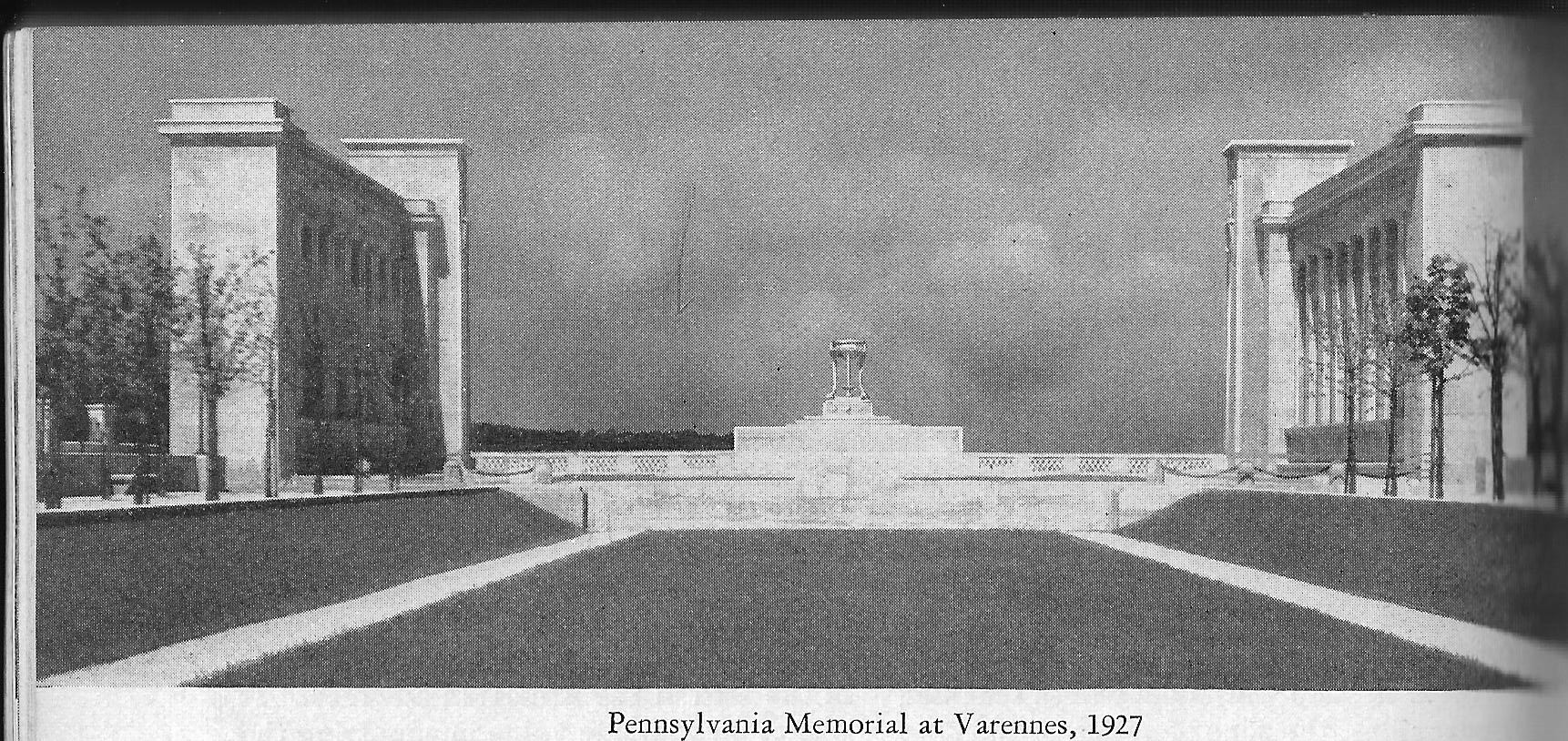
- Pennsylvania Memorial to The Great War at Varennes in 1927
- For troops from Pennsylvania who served in the Great War among whom were the liberators of Varennes 1918
- Unveiled: 1927; 98 years ago
- Location: 49°13′35″N 5°01′52″E near Varennes-en-Argonne, France
- Designed by: Paul Philippe Cret; Thomas H. Atherton
- In honor of her troops who served in the Great War among whom were the liberators of Varennes 1918 and in grateful appreciation of their service this memorial is erected by the State of Pennsylvania 1927.

The Pennsylvania Memorial is a war memorial in Varennes-en-Argonne, France dedicated to volunteers from Pennsylvania who participated in the First World War. The memorial is constructed in a Greek style and the viewing platform gives a view of the Aire valley. The memorial was designed by architects Thomas H. Atherton and Paul Philippe Cret. It was erected by the Commonwealth of Pennsylvania, via the Pennsylvania Monuments Commission, in 1927.

== Design ==
The memorial is located on the grounds of a former chateau and Saint-Gengoult de Varennes church, both destroyed between 1640-1642. The memorial is done is a neoclassical style, it is made of stone and white marble. Two peristyles on square columns surround an esplanade, in the centre of which is a pedestal with a bronze basin resting on a tripod decorated with Greek soldiers. On the basin is a quote from United States President Woodrow Wilson: "The right is more precious than peace". On the base of the basin, lions' heads have been carved. On the last columns, huge vertical swords in relief can be admired. The monument contains many sculptures reminiscent of the style of Greek monuments of antiquity.
