= Harrisburg Military Post =

- U.S. National Register of Historic Places
- U.S. Historic district
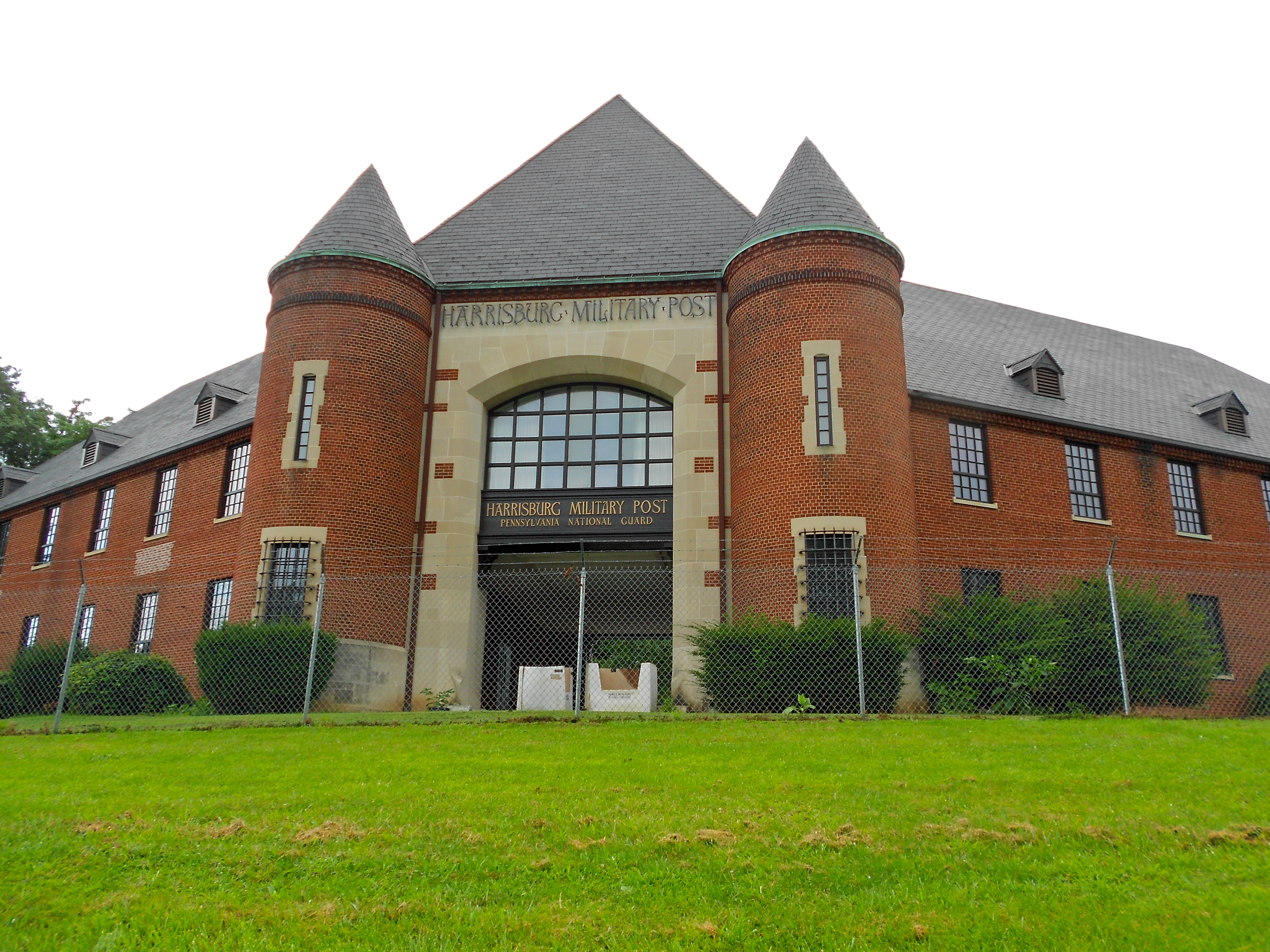
- Harrisburg Military Post, August 2013

- Location within Pennsylvania Location within the United States
- Location: Jct. of 14th and Calder Sts., Harrisburg, Pennsylvania
- Coordinates: 40°16′44″N 76°52′30″W
- Area: 28 acres (11 ha)
- Built: 1929
- Architect: Multiple
- Architectural style: Late 19th And 20th Century Revivals, Tudor Revival, Other, French Renaissance
- MPS: Pennsylvania National Guard Armories MPS
- NRHP reference No.: 91001755
- Added to NRHP: November 29, 1991

The Harrisburg Military Post is an historic National Guard armory complex and national historic district which is located in Harrisburg, Dauphin County, Pennsylvania. It serves as the headquarters for the 28th Infantry Division.

It was added to the National Register of Historic Places in 1991.

== History and architectural features ==
The complex consists of ten buildings, six of which are contributing to the historic place. The contributing buildings were built between 1929 and 1938, and are a three-story, French Renaissance-style Administration Building, which was erected in 1938, a warehouse, which was built in 1933, a Tudor Revival-style gun shed, which was built in 1930, Stable No. 4, which was built in 1932, Stable Nos. 2 and 3, which were erected in 1930, and Stable No. 1, which was built in 1929.
