= Carlisle Armory (Carlisle, Pennsylvania) =

- U.S. National Register of Historic Places
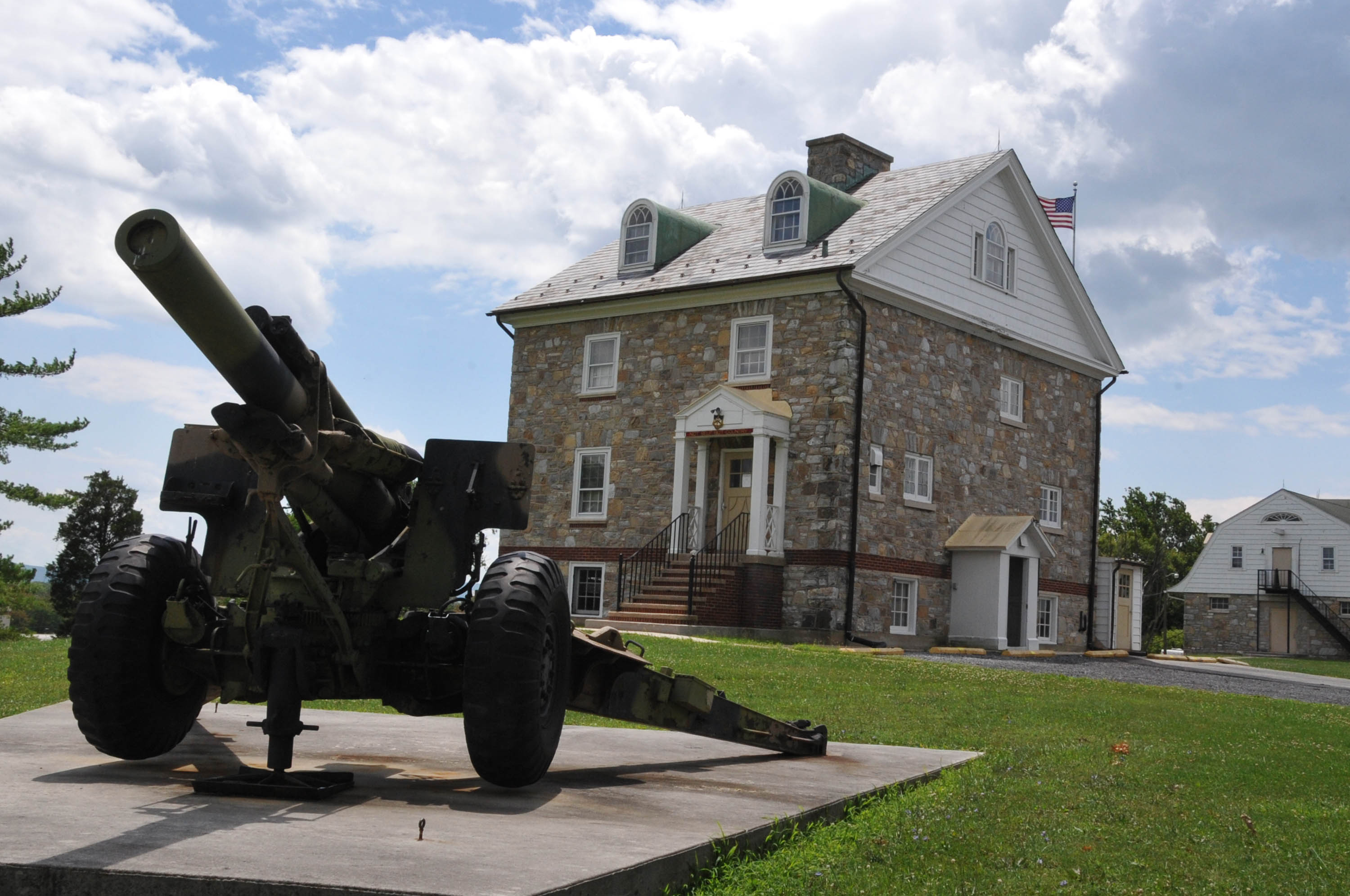

- Location within Pennsylvania Location within the United States
- Location: 504 Cavalry Rd., Carlisle, Pennsylvania
- Coordinates: 40°13′13″N 77°10′43″W
- Area: 36 acres (15 ha)
- Built: 1931
- Built by: Starford Lumber Co.
- Architect: Atherton, Thomas H.
- Architectural style: Colonial Revival
- MPS: Pennsylvania National Guard Armories MPS
- NRHP reference No.: 89002071
- Added to NRHP: December 22, 1989

Carlisle Armory is a historic National Guard armory located at Carlisle, Cumberland County, Pennsylvania. It was built in 1931, and consists of separate administration and stable buildings executed in the Colonial Revival style. It was designed by architect Thomas H. Atherton. The administration building is a two-story stone and brick building with a gable roof and two arched dormers. The side gables feature Palladian windows. The stable building is a one-story, gambrel roofed building with gable dormers. The stable building has been converted to offices, classrooms, locker rooms, and storage.

It was added to the National Register of Historic Places in 1989.
