= Varennes-en-Argonne =

- Commune
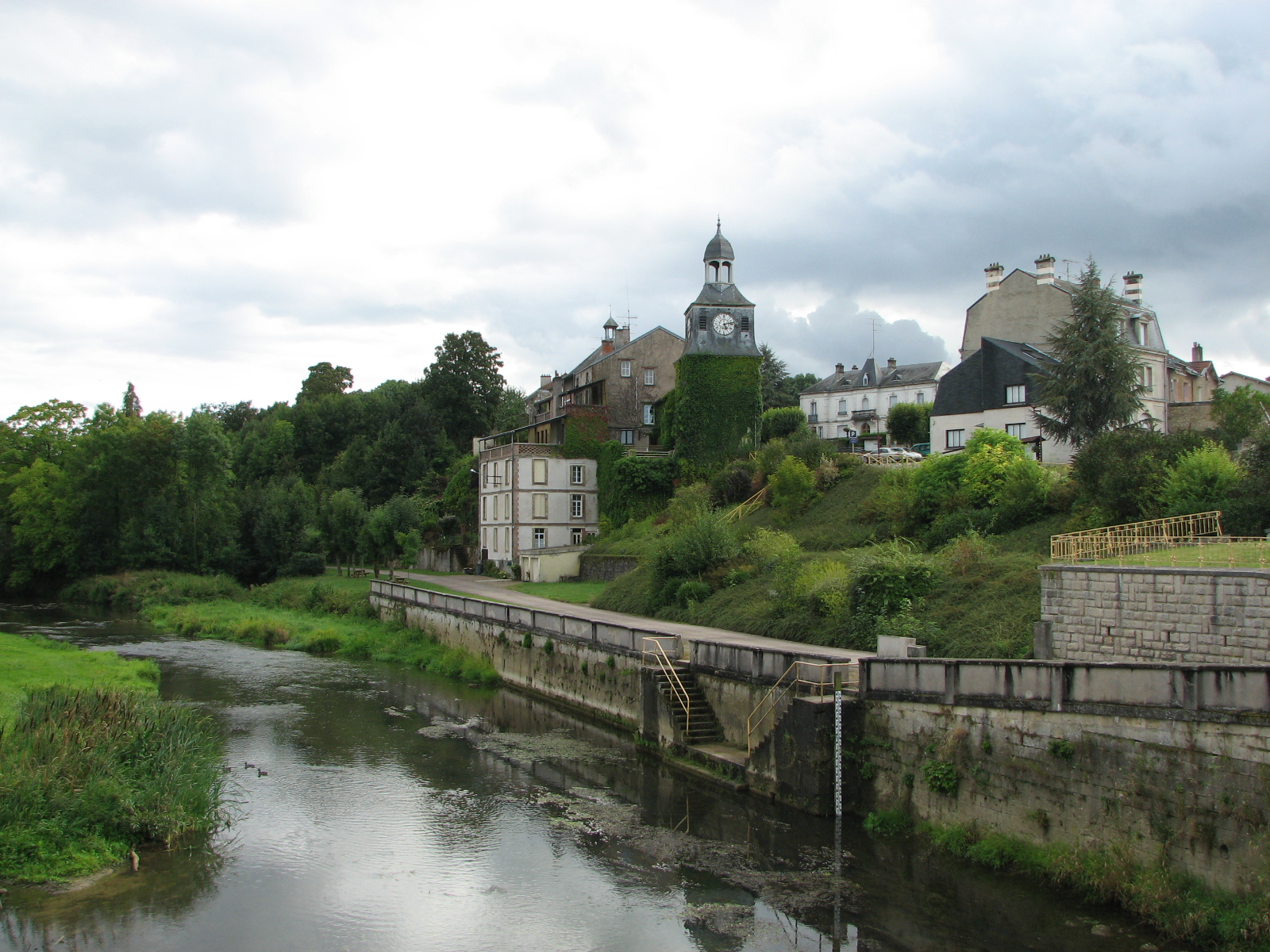
- Tower Louis XVI and the river Aire

- Coat of arms
- Location of Varennes-en-Argonne
- Location within France Location within Grand Est
- Coordinates: 49°13′37″N 5°02′06″E
- Country: France
- Region: Grand Est
- Department: Meuse
- Arrondissement: Verdun
- Canton: Clermont-en-Argonne
- Intercommunality: Argonne-Meuse

Government
  - Mayor (2020–2026): Philippe Fosseprez
- Area^{1}: 11.81 km^{2} (4.56 sq mi)
- Elevation: 195 m (640 ft)
- Highest elevation: 264 m (866 ft)
- Lowest elevation: 144 m (472 ft)
- Population (2023): 636
  - Density: 53.9/km^{2} (139/sq mi)
- Time zone: UTC+01:00 (CET)
  - Summer (DST): UTC+02:00 (CEST)
- INSEE/Postal code: 55527 /55270
- ^{1} French Land Register data, which excludes lakes, ponds, glaciers > 1 km^{2} (0.386 sq mi or 247 acres) and river estuaries.

Varennes-en-Argonne (French pronunciation: [vaʁɛn ɑ̃.n‿aʁɡɔn], literally Varennes in Argonne) or simply Varennes (German: Wöringen) is a commune in the Meuse department in the Grand Est region in Northeastern France. As of 2023, the population of the commune was 636.

== Geography ==
Varennes-en-Argonne lies on the river Aire to the northeast of Sainte-Menehould, near Verdun.

== History ==
Varennes is most notable as it was the ending point of the Flight to Varennes. In June 1791, Louis XVI and his immediate family made a dash for the nearest friendly border, that of the Austrian Netherlands in modern Belgium (Queen Marie Antoinette being a sister to Leopold II, Archduke of Austria and Holy Roman Emperor). In Varennes, Louis and his family were arrested by Jean-Baptiste Drouet, the local postmaster, who had been alerted by a message received from nearby Sainte-Menehould. It is said that at Sainte-Menehould, where the escaping party had spent the previous night, a merchant alerted the town authorities of their presence after recognizing the King's face on an Assignat as Louis tried to buy something from a shop. The royal family was returned to the Tuileries in humiliating captivity, and Louis and Marie-Antoinette were subsequently guillotined in 1793.

Located in the Zone rouge, Varennes was completely destroyed during the First World War but was reconstructed afterwards. The Pennsylvania Memorial, a monument for volunteers from 28th Division Pennsylvania in the First World War, was erected in Varennes during the Interwar period.

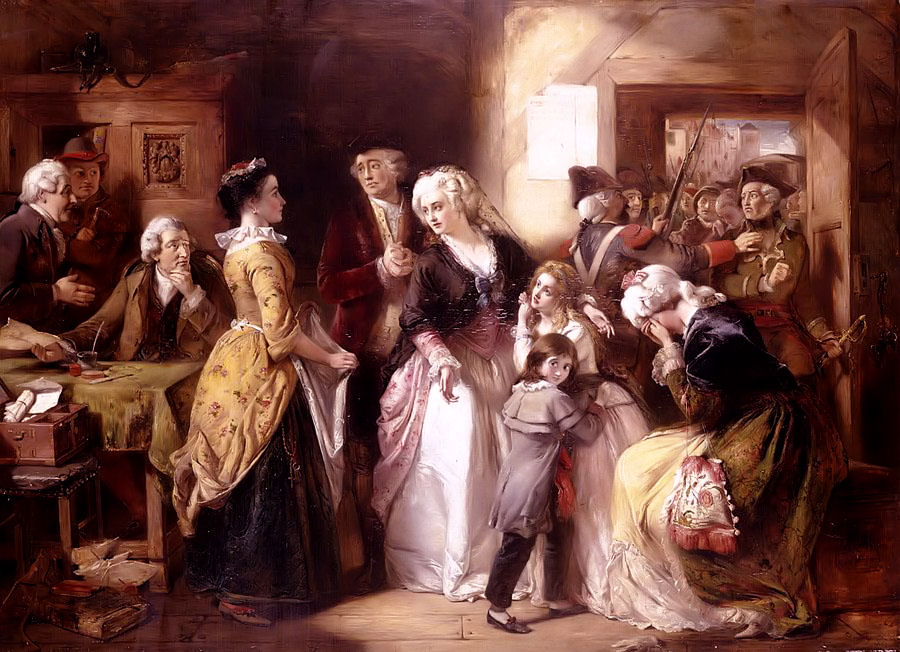
Arrest of Louis XVI and his Family in Varennes, 1791.

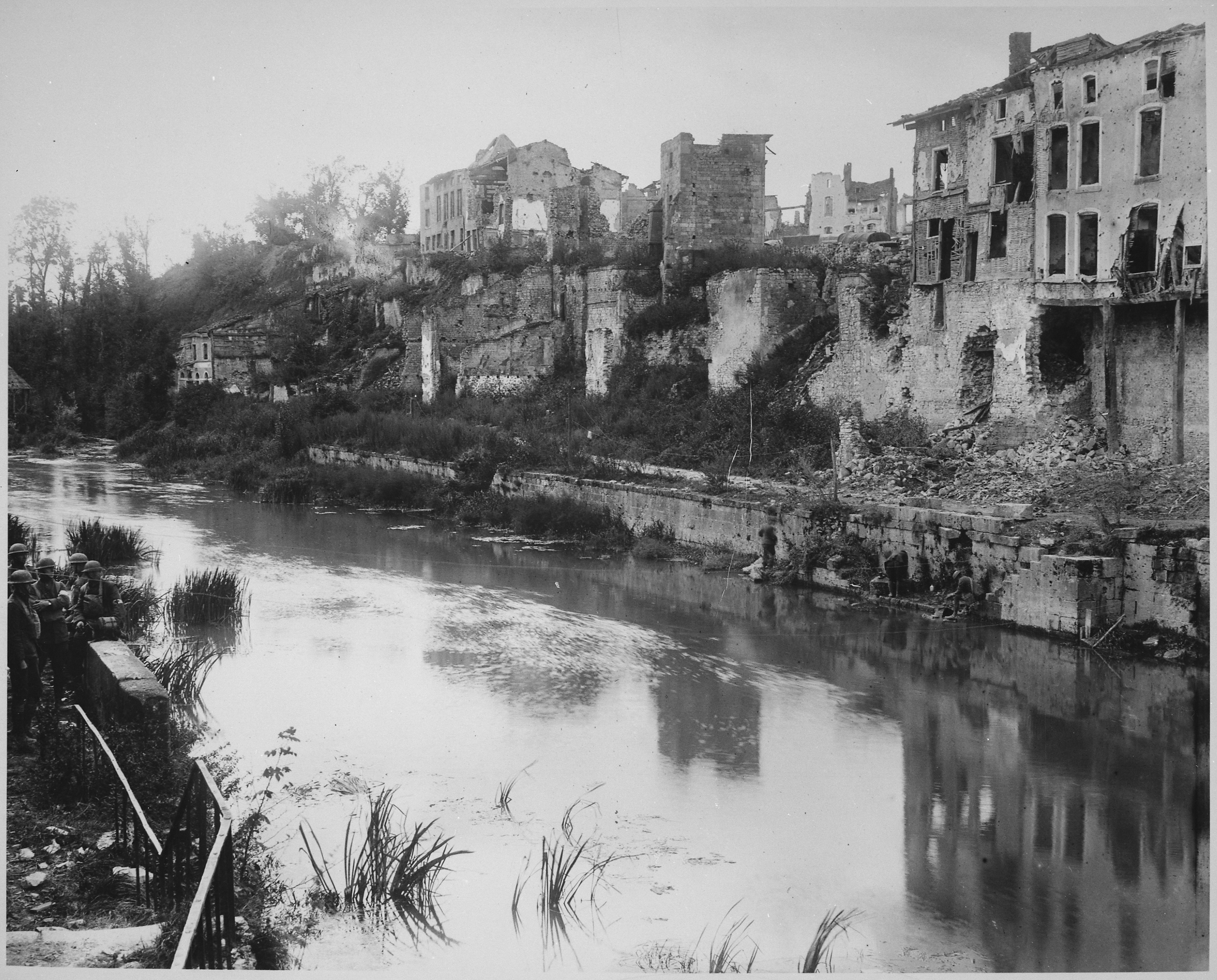
Ruins of Varennes in 1918.

== Points of interest ==
- Arboretum de Varennes-en-Argonne

== See also ==
- Communes of the Meuse department
- Flight to Varennes
