= Mansfield, Pennsylvania =

Borough in Pennsylvania, US

- Borough
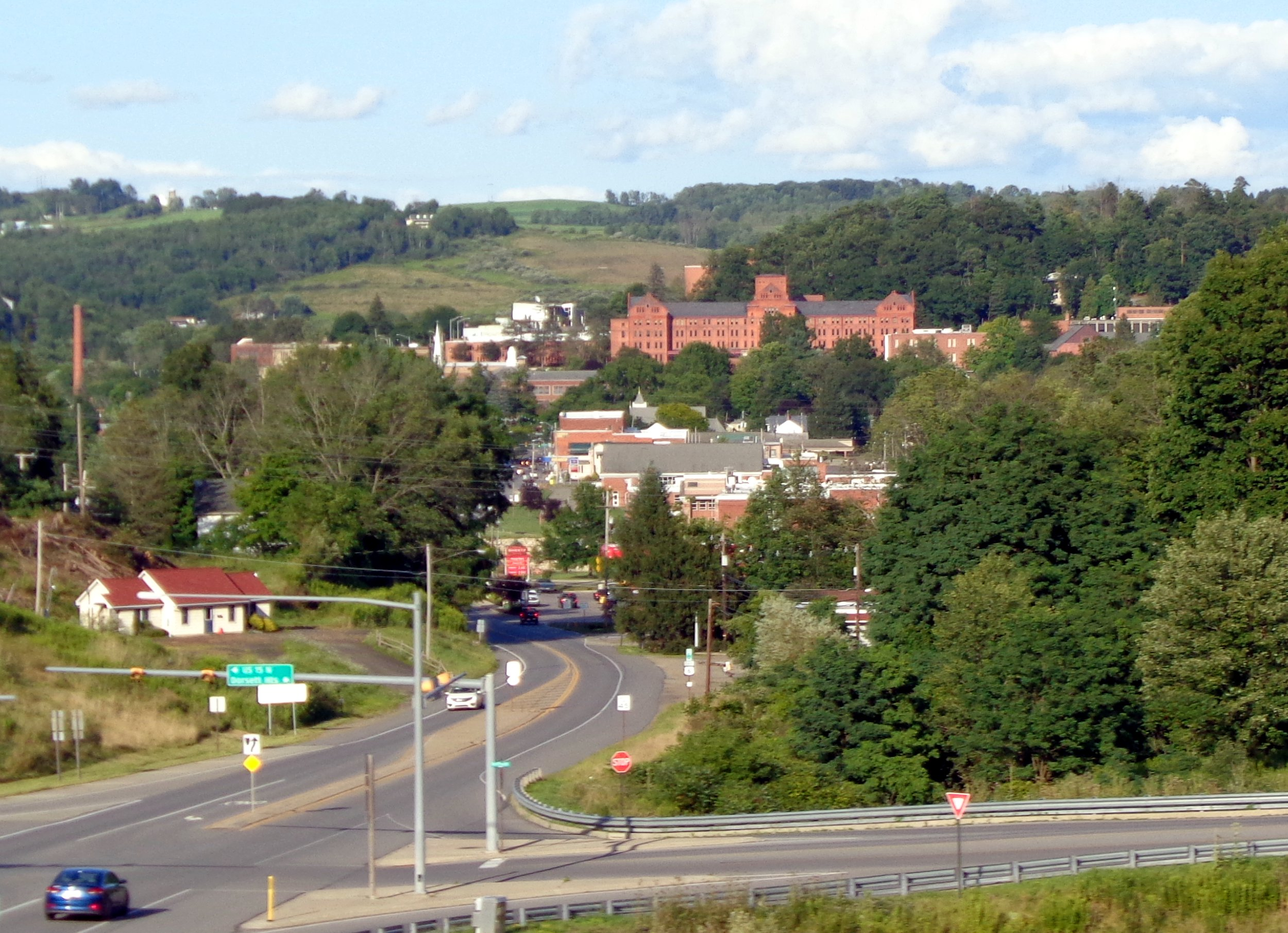
- Downtown Mansfield looking east from I-99/US-15

- Location of Mansfield in Tioga County, Pennsylvania.

- Location within the U.S. state of Pennsylvania Mansfield (the United States)
- Coordinates: 41°48′22″N 77°04′32″W
- Country: United States
- State: Pennsylvania
- County: Tioga
- Settled: 1804
- Incorporated (borough): 1857

Area
  - Total: 1.88 sq mi (4.88 km^{2})
  - Land: 1.88 sq mi (4.88 km^{2})
  - Water: 0 sq mi (0.00 km^{2})
- Elevation: 1,181 ft (360 m)

Population (2020)
  - Total: 2,839
  - Density: 1,506.8/sq mi (581.77/km^{2})
- Time zone: Eastern (EST)
  - Summer (DST): EDT
- ZIP code: 16933
- Area code: 570
- FIPS code: 42-47080
- Website: https://mansfieldborough.org/

Mansfield is a borough located in east-central Tioga County, Pennsylvania, United States, in the Tioga River valley. As of the 2020 census, Mansfield had a population of 2,839. It is situated at the intersection of U.S. Route 6 and U.S. Business Route 15, about 36 miles (58 km) southwest of Elmira, New York.

== History ==
In 1800, an English settler from Rhode Island named Asa Mann cleared a large amount of forest, and in 1804 laid out the plan for a town on this estate—Mann's field. The borough was incorporated in 1857. In the same year, the Mansfield Classical Seminary was founded, which became a state normal school in 1862 and is today Mansfield University of Pennsylvania.

Mansfield is the place where the first night football game was played under electric lights, on September 28, 1892 sponsored by the Edison Illuminating Company. The 1892 Wyoming Seminary vs. Mansfield State Normal football game is celebrated in an annual festival which celebrates the 1890s.

The number of people living here in 1900 amounted to 1,847, and in 1910, 1,654. The population was 3,411 at the 2000 census. As of 2004, the borough had an estimated population of 3,463. As of the 2010 Census, the population was 3,625.

The Mansfield Armory was listed on the National Register of Historic Places in 1991.

== Geography ==
Mansfield is located at 41°48′27″N 77°4′42″W (41.807383, -77.078409).

According to the United States Census Bureau, the borough has a total area of 1.9 square miles (4.9 km^{2}), all land.

Mansfield is surrounded by Richmond Township.

== Demographics ==
Historical population
Census	Pop.	Note	%±
1860	351		—
1870	616		75.5%
1880	1,611		161.5%
1890	1,762		9.4%
1900	1,847		4.8%
1910	1,645		−10.9%
1920	1,609		−2.2%
1930	1,755		9.1%
1940	1,880		7.1%
1950	2,657		41.3%
1960	2,678		0.8%
1970	4,114		53.6%
1980	3,322		−19.3%
1990	3,538		6.5%
2000	3,411		−3.6%
2010	3,625		6.3%
2020	2,839		−21.7%
2021 (est.)	2,840	▲	0.0%

As of the census of 2000, there were 3,411 people, 957 households, and 467 families living in the borough. The population density was 1,815.2 inhabitants per square mile (700.9/km^{2}). There were 1,012 housing units at an average density of 538.5 per square mile (207.9/km^{2}). The racial makeup of the borough was 93.35% White, 4.16% African American, 0.32% Native American, 0.76% Asian, 0.38% from other races, and 1.03% from two or more races. Hispanic or Latino of any race were 1.00% of the population.

There were 957 households, out of which 23.3% had children under the age of 18 living with them, 35.6% were married couples living together, 10.1% had a female householder with no husband present, and 51.2% were non-families. 34.8% of all households were made up of individuals, and 12.6% had someone living alone who was 65 years of age or older. The average household size was 2.21 and the average family size was 2.83.

In the borough the population was spread out, with 13.1% under the age of 18, 50.2% from 18 to 24, 15.3% from 25 to 44, 12.4% from 45 to 64, and 9.0% who were 65 years of age or older. The median age was 22 years. For every 100 females, there were 86.8 males. For every 100 females age 18 and over, there were 85.4 males.

The median income for a household in the borough was $27,500, and the median income for a family was $39,420. Males had a median income of $26,858 versus $18,693 for females. The per capita income for the borough was $11,042. About 10.0% of families and 26.7% of the population were below the poverty line, including 18.7% of those under age 18 and 10.7% of those age 65 or over.

== Education ==
- It is in the Southern Tioga School District.
- Warren L. Miller Elementary School
- Mansfield Jr./Sr. High School
- New Covenant Academy
- Mansfield University of Pennsylvania

== Notable people ==
- Charles Herman Allen (February 11, 1828 – September 11, 1904) was an American educator and academic administrator.
- Minnie M. Argetsinger (1882–1954), American Baptist missionary in China, 1919-1949
- Matt Kurzejewski, racing driver
- Tom McMillen, former professional basketball player and former congressman (D-Maryland) (1987–1993)
