= Market Street Bridge (Wilkes-Barre, Pennsylvania) =

- U.S. National Register of Historic Places
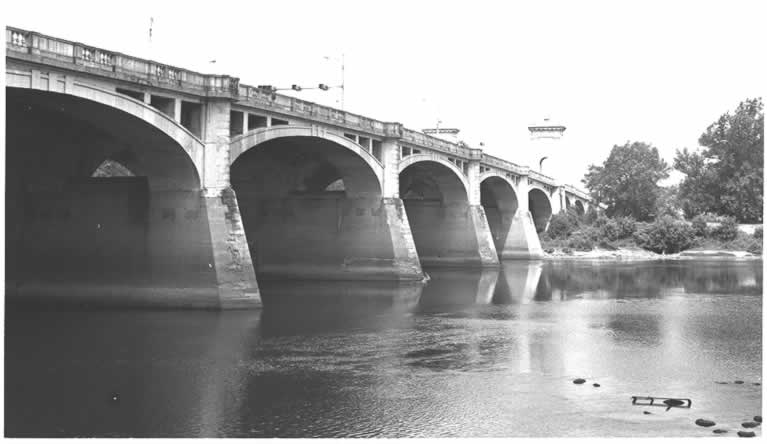
- Market Street Bridge in 1982

- Location within Pennsylvania Location within the United States
- Location: Market St./LR 11 over Susquehanna River, Kingston and Wilkes-Barre, Pennsylvania
- Coordinates: 41°14′55″N 75°53′7″W
- Area: 3 acres (1.2 ha)
- Built: 1926-1929
- Built by: Rae, Walter S.
- Architect: Carrère and Hastings
- MPS: Highway Bridges Owned by the Commonwealth of Pennsylvania, Department of Transportation TR
- NRHP reference No.: 88000873
- Added to NRHP: June 22, 1988

The Market Street Bridge is a concrete arch bridge that crosses the Susquehanna River between Kingston and Wilkes-Barre, Luzerne County, Pennsylvania.

It was listed on the National Register of Historic Places in 1988.

== History and notable features ==
This bridge was designed by the architectural firm of Carrère and Hastings with consulting engineers Benjamin H. Davis and David A. Keefe, and was built between 1926 and 1929. The bridge is 1,274.3-foot-long (388.4 m) with twelve spans, including four main spans measuring 120-foot-long (37 m) each.

The architects designed four triumphal arches (or pylons) surmounted by limestone eagles with partially spread wings, intended as a memorial to veterans of the First World War. The paired pylons, two at each side of the bridge, are connected by a classical balustrade running the full length of the bridge.

== Gallery ==
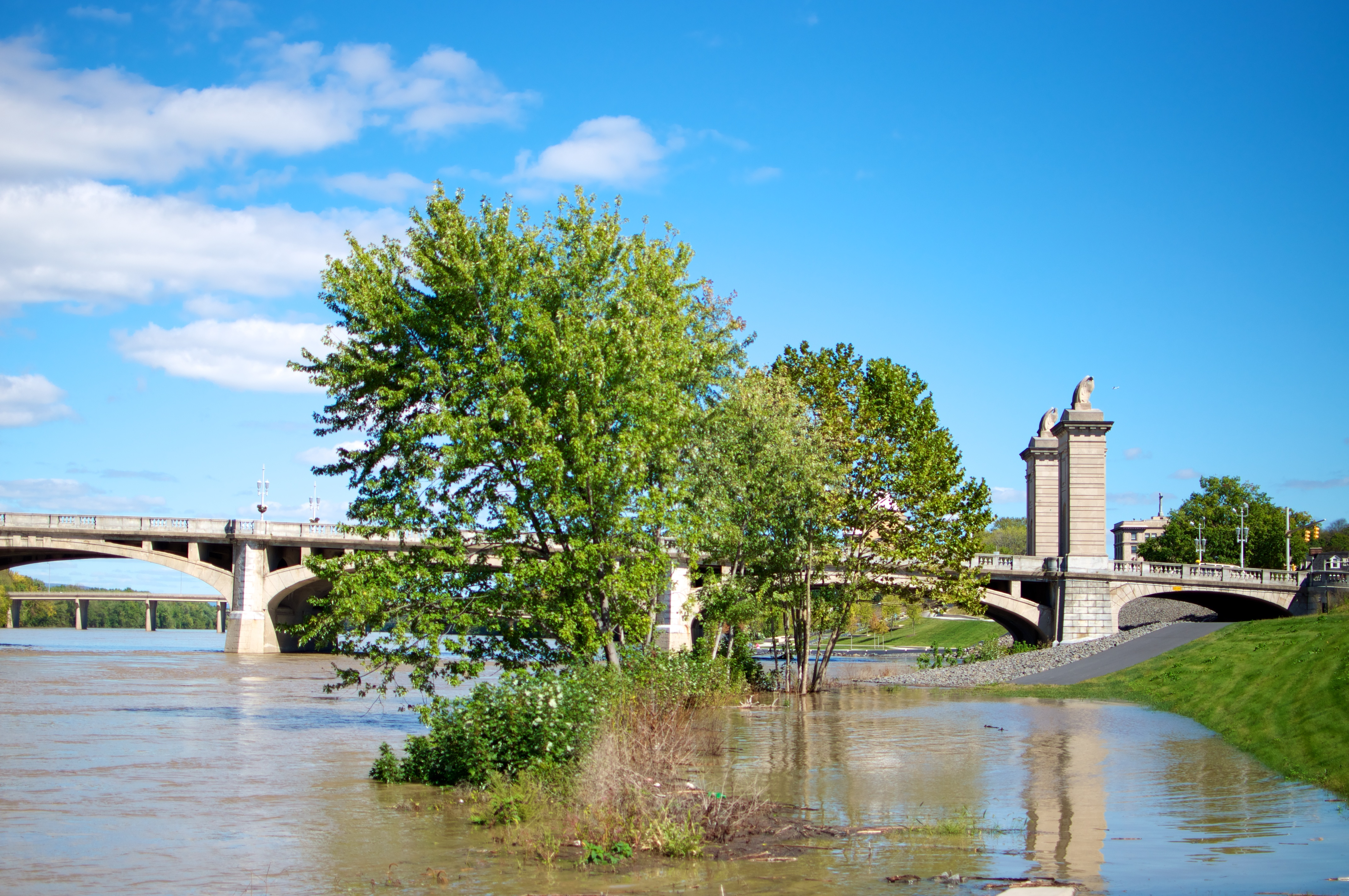
Market Street Bridge

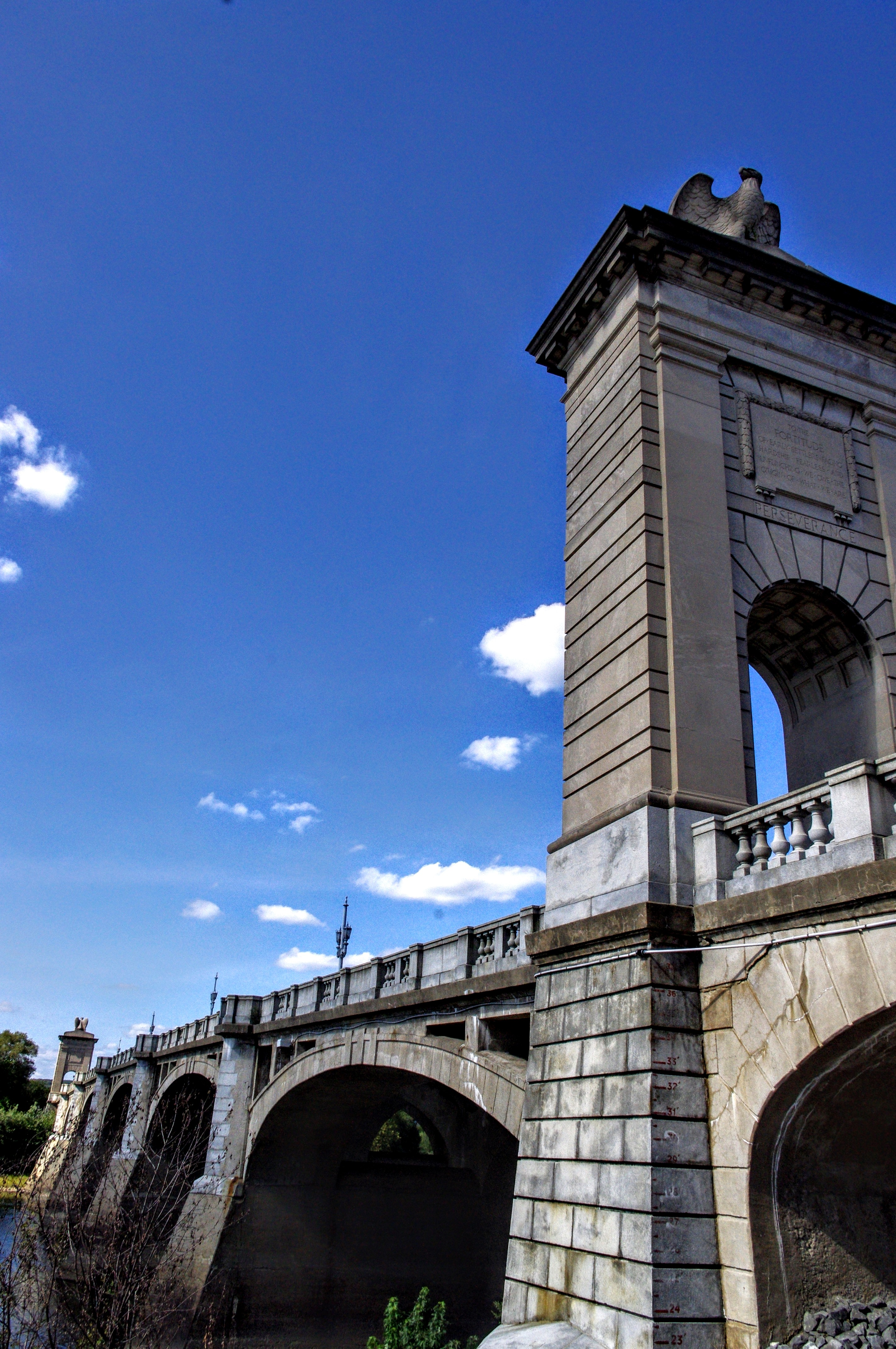
Pylon and span

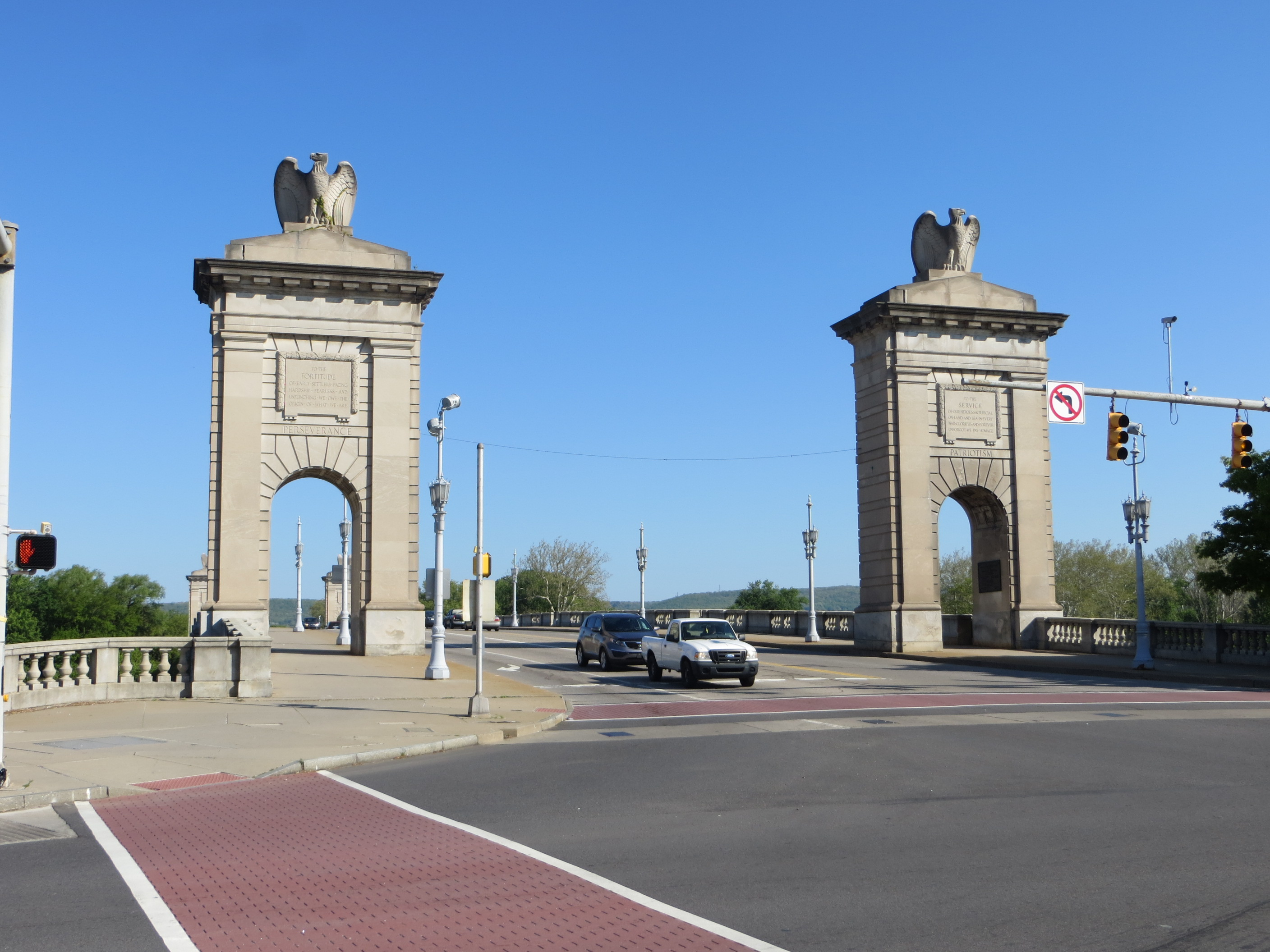
Market Street Bridge entering Wilkes-Barre

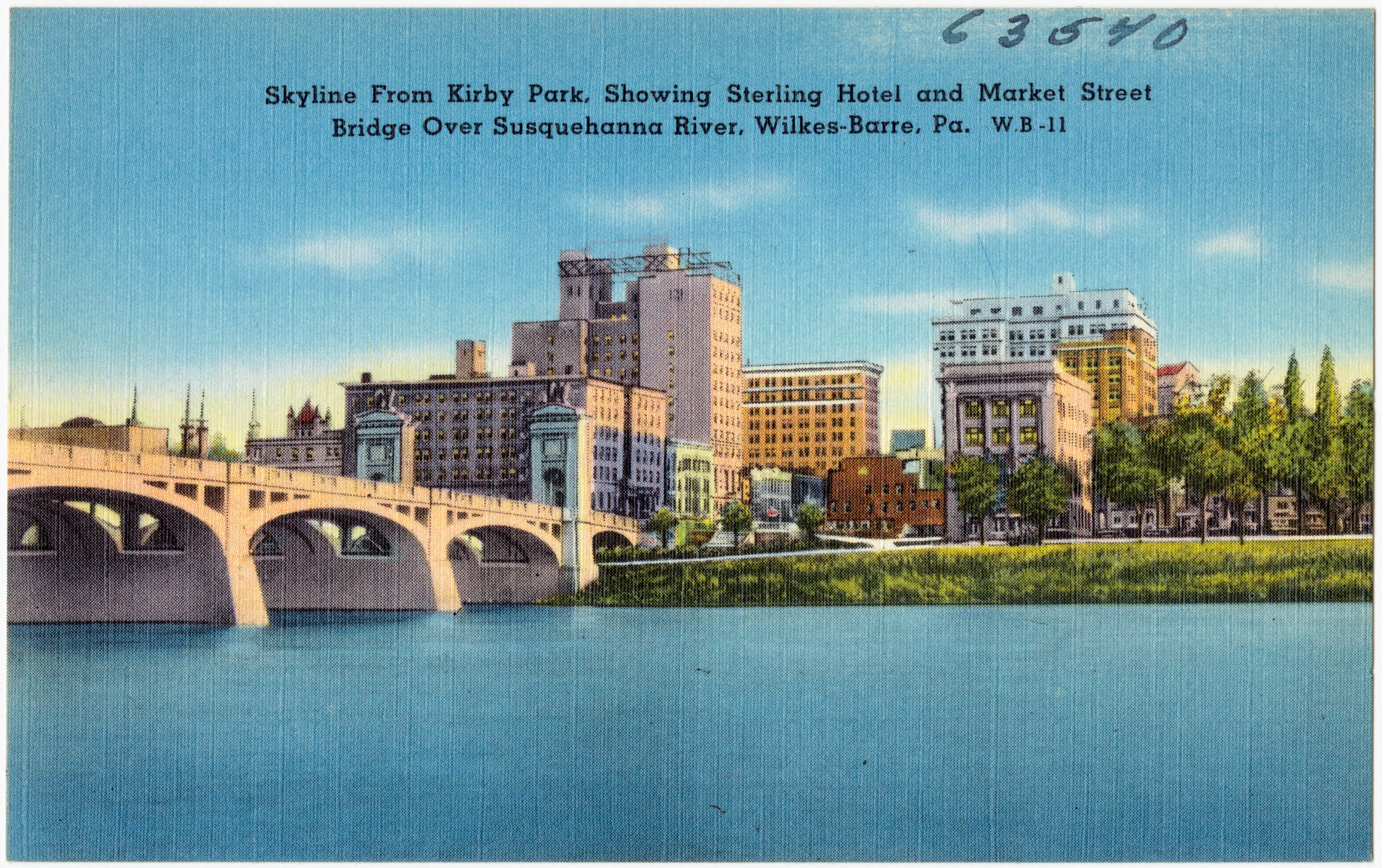
Postcard showing the bridge and Wilkes-Barre skyline

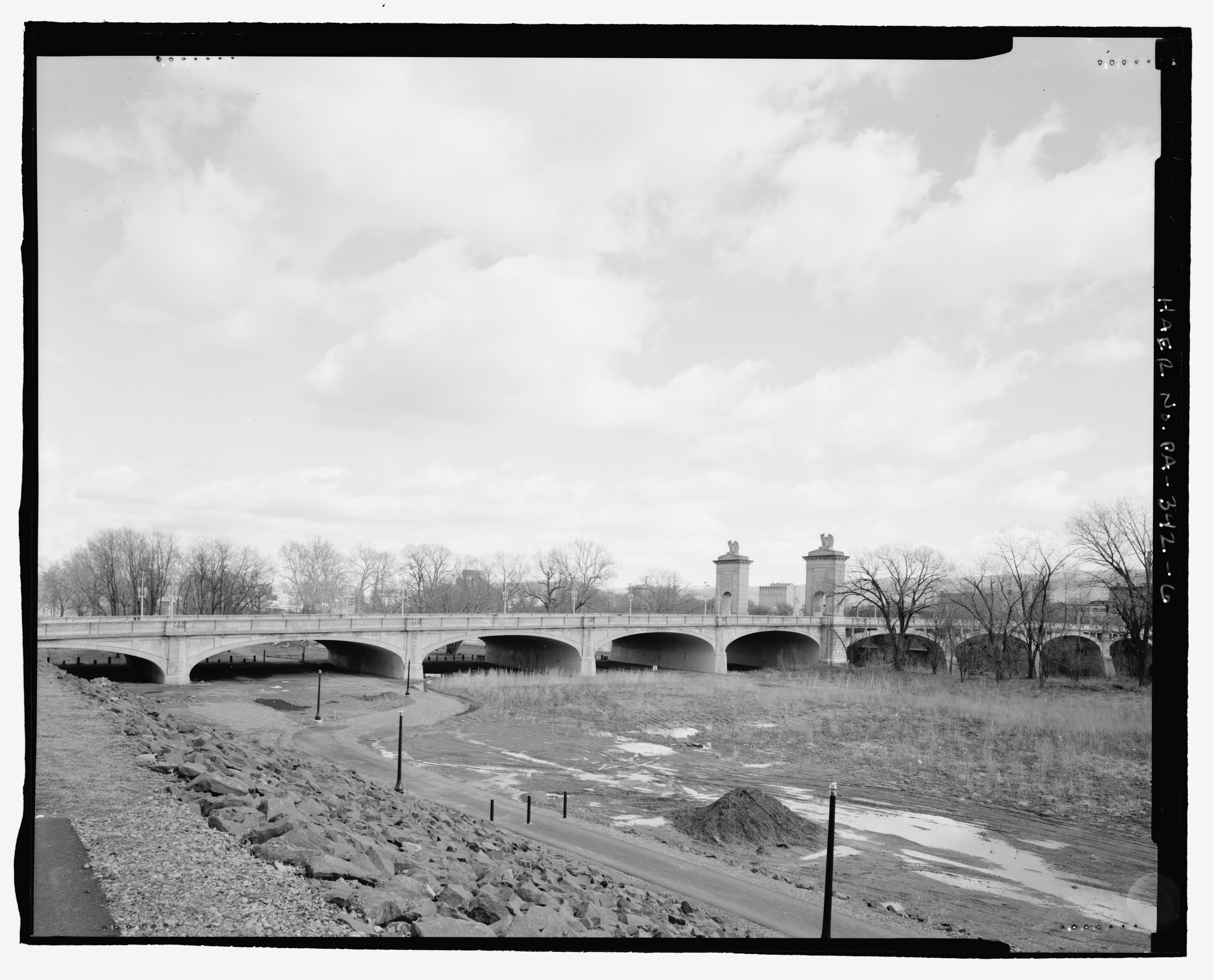
North face

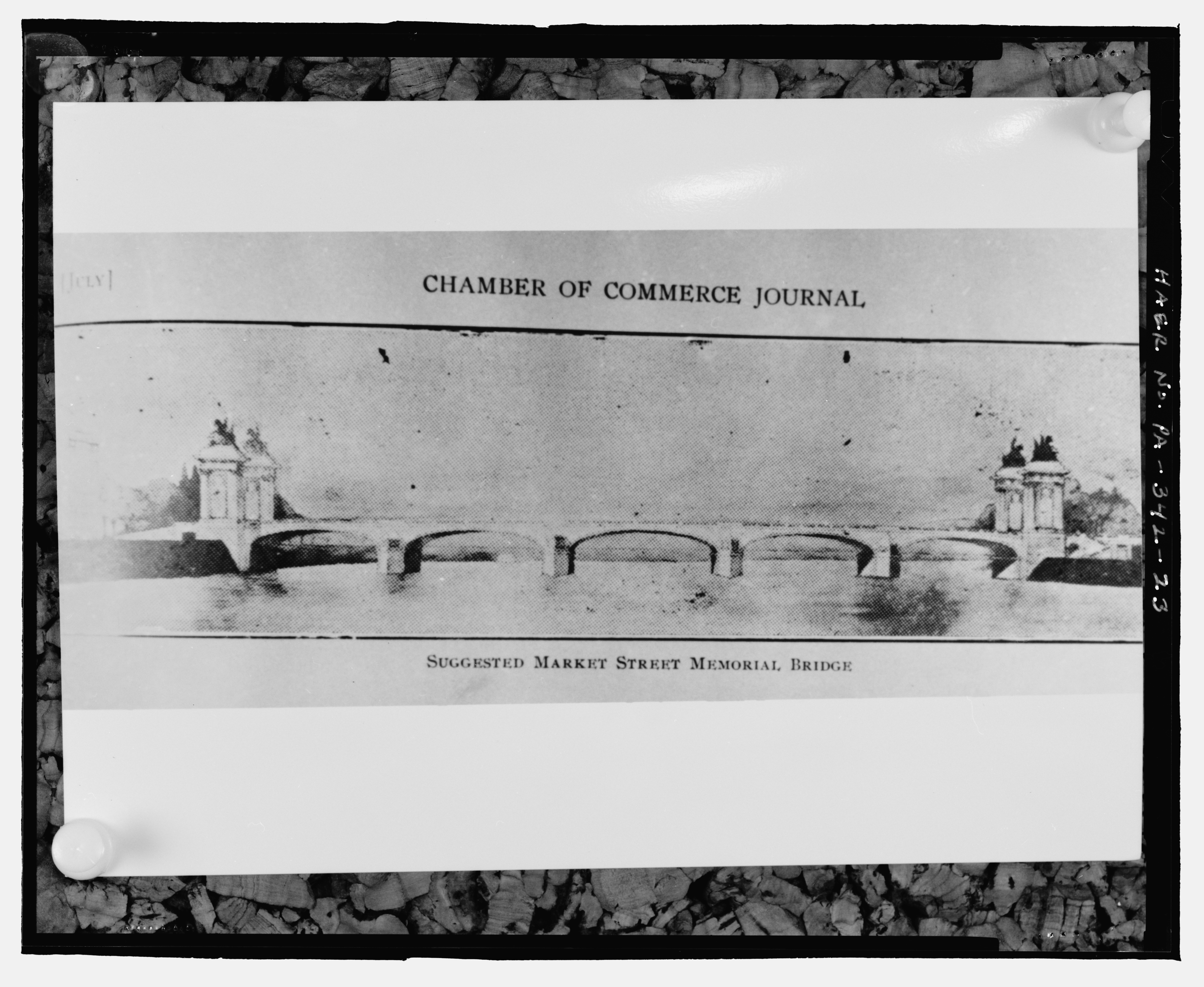
Suggested plan for the bridge

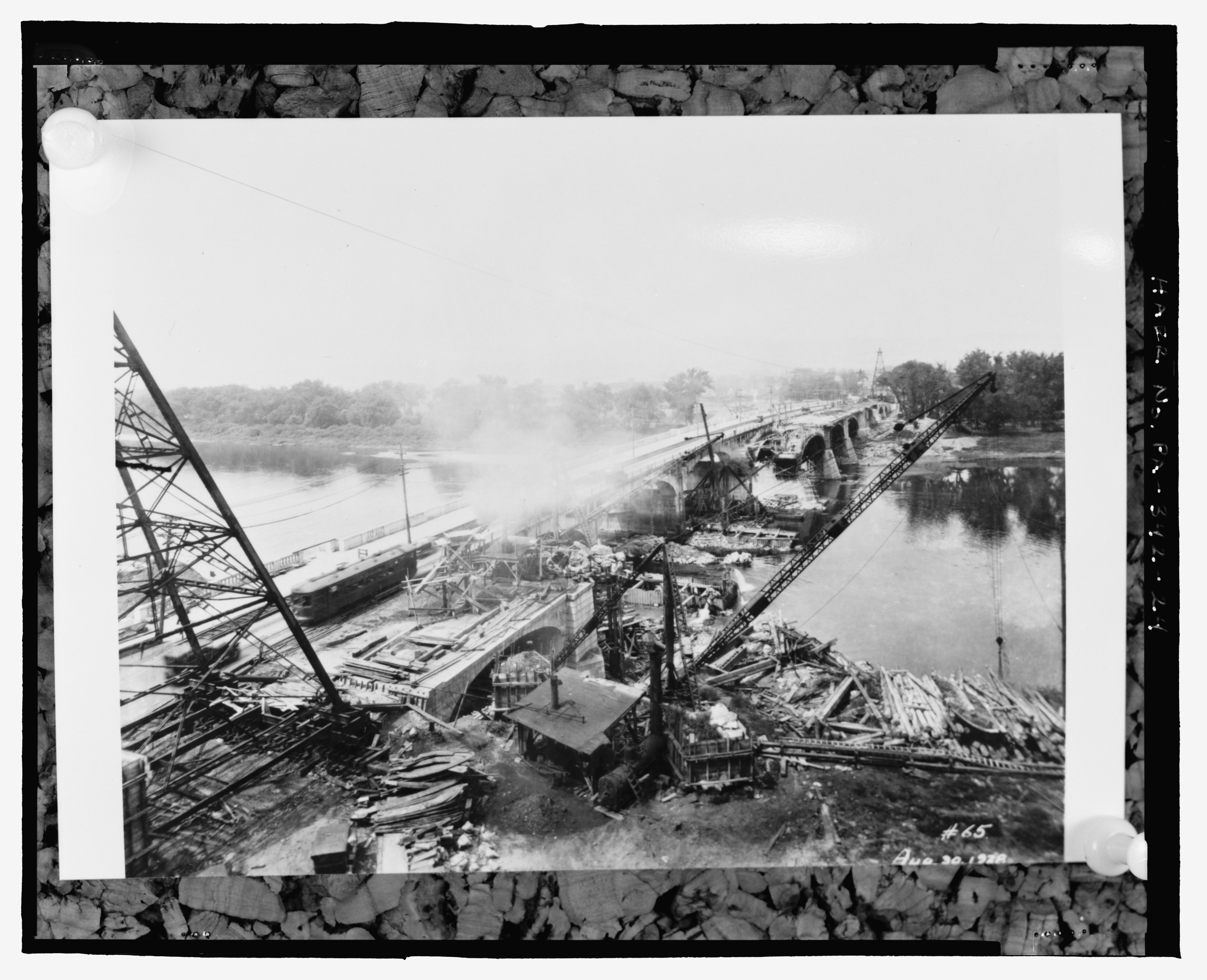
Construction

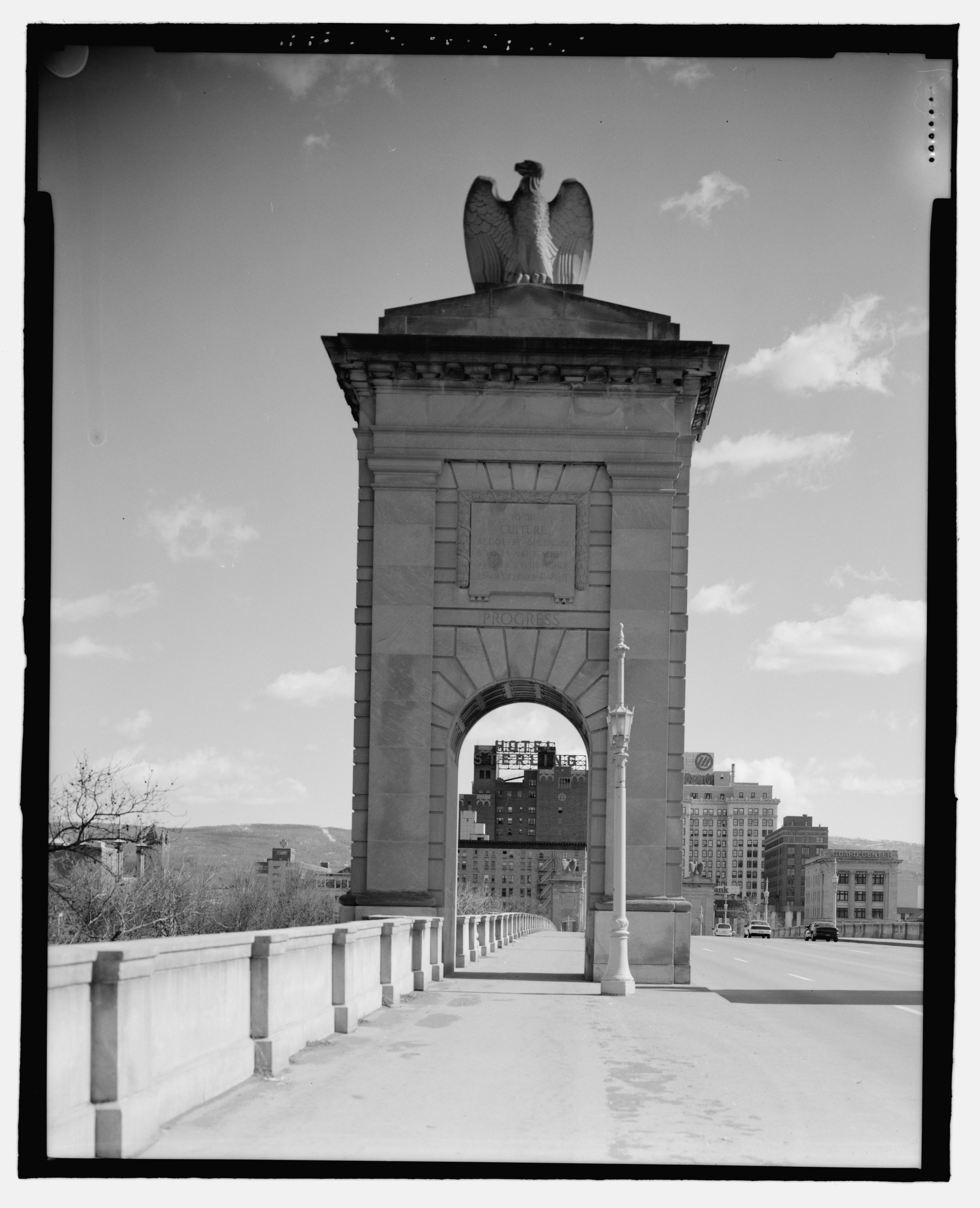
Northeast pylon with Hotel Sterling in background

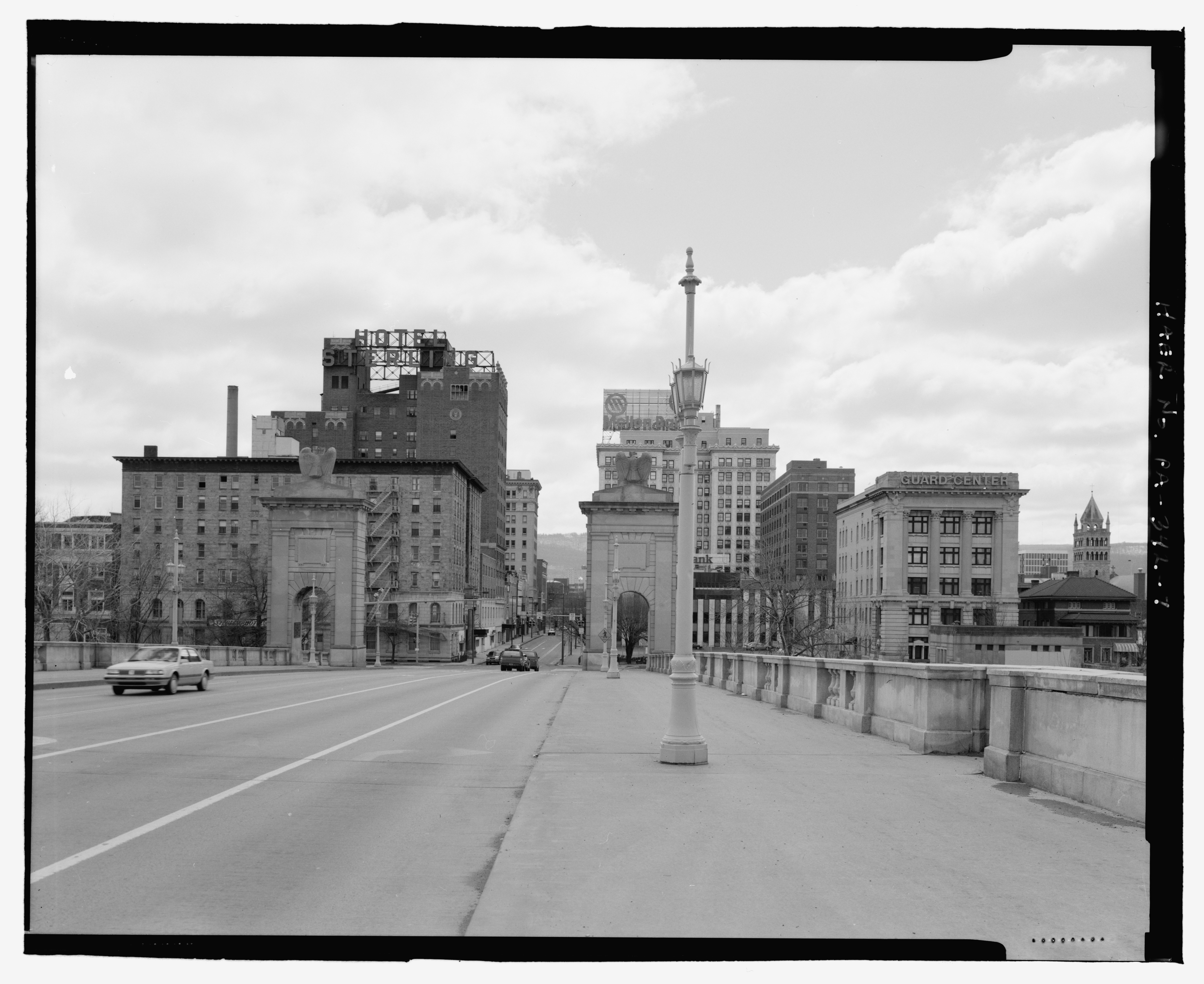
Facing east from the bridge

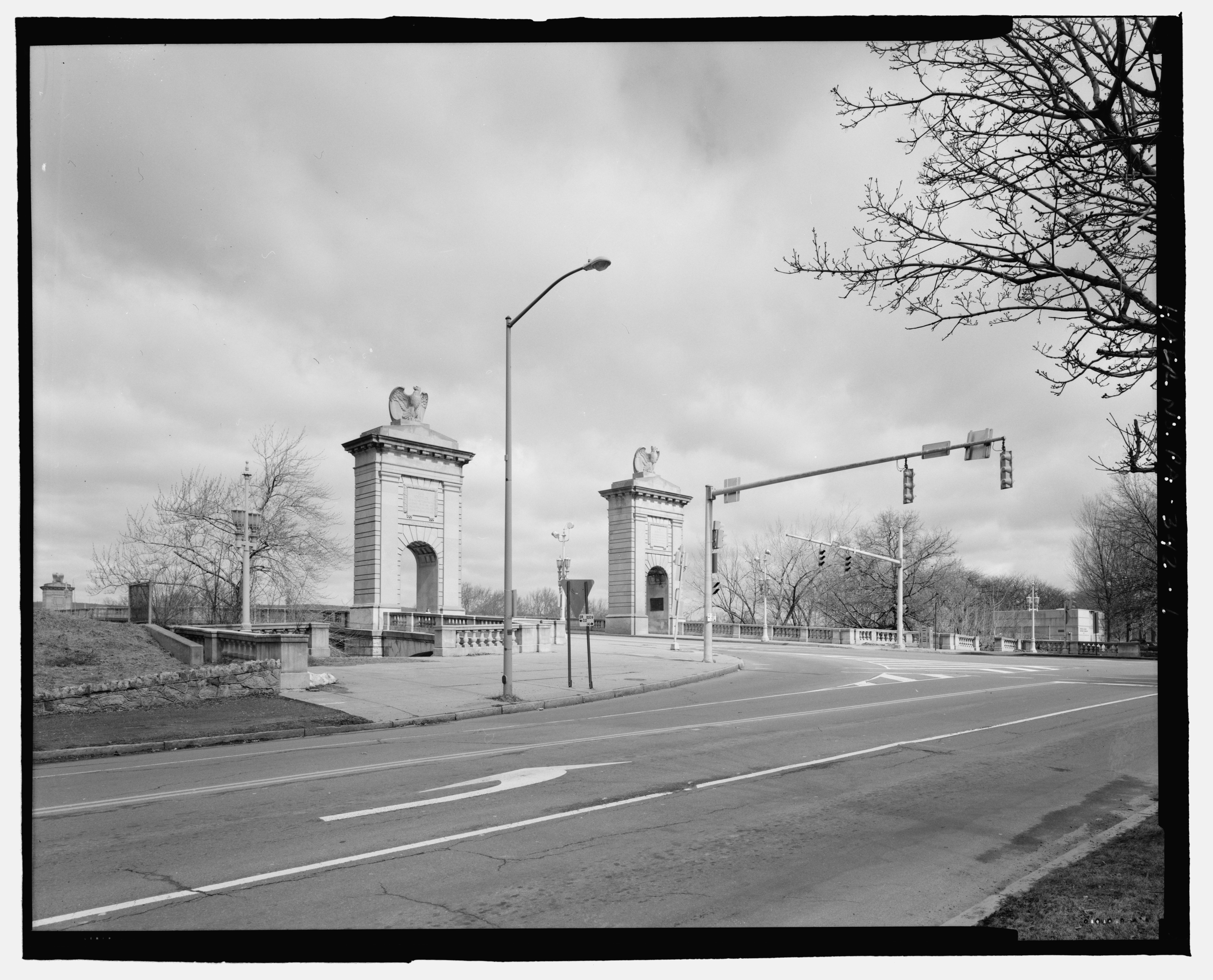
East entrance of bridge

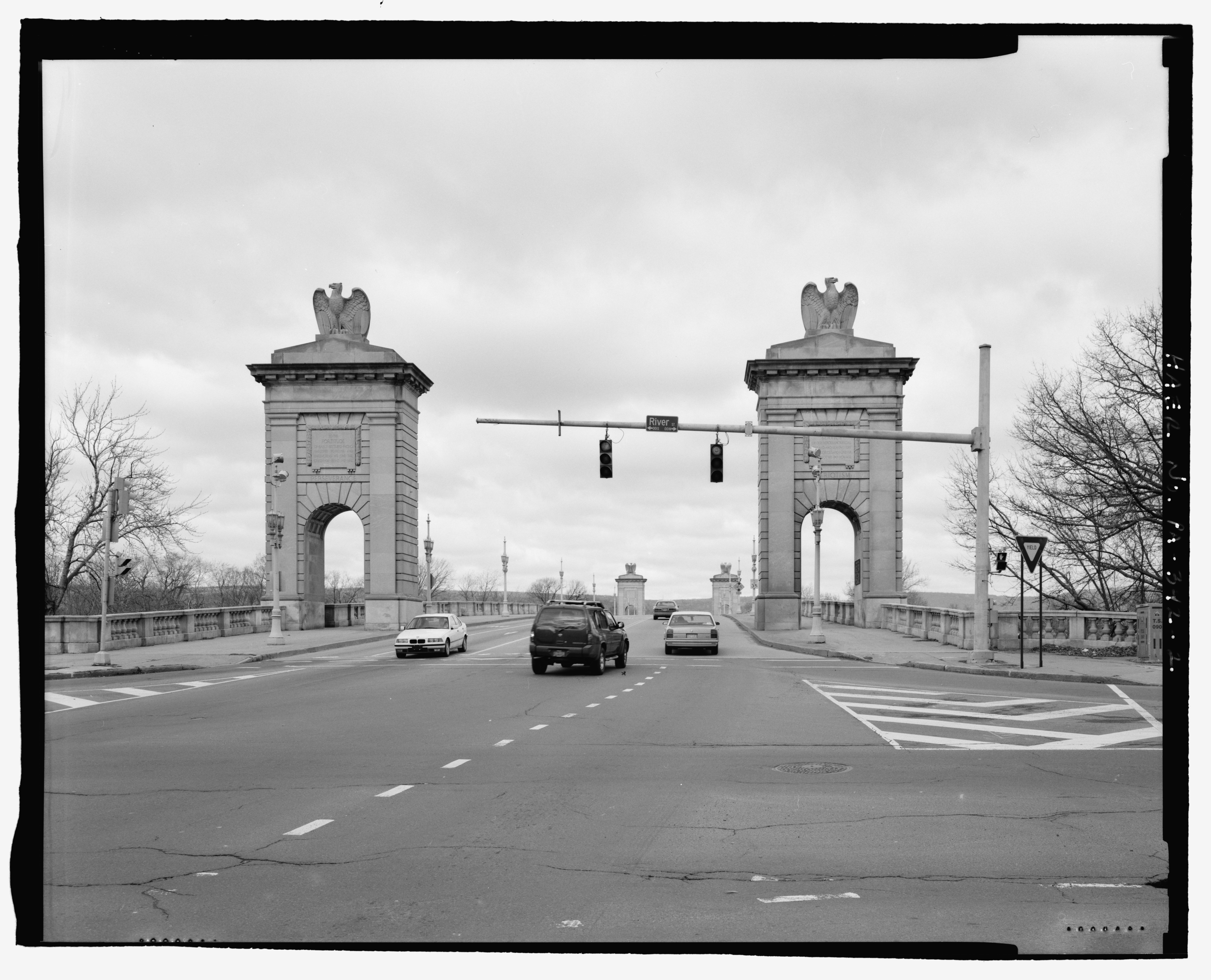
East entrance of bridge

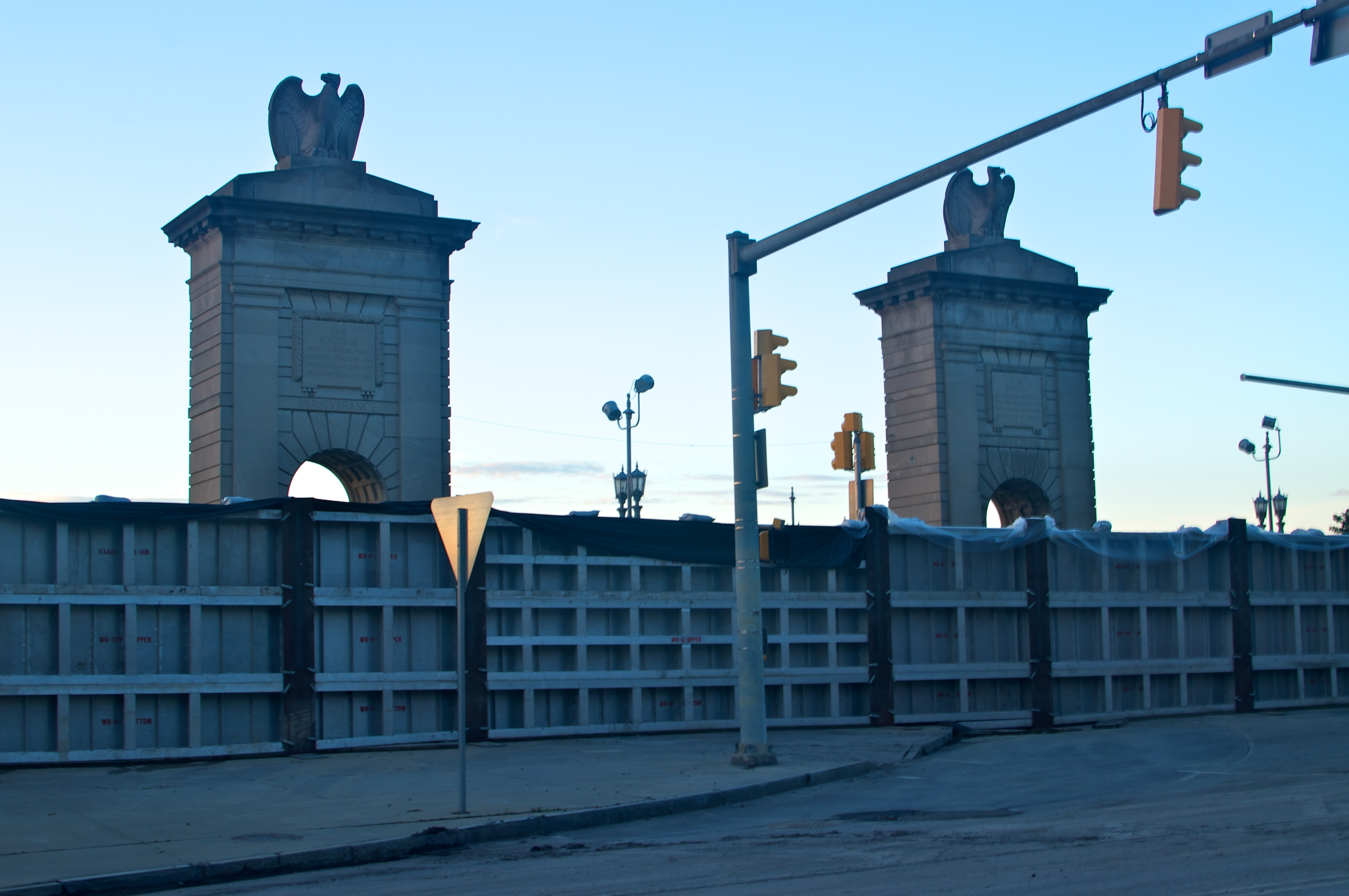
East entrance of bridge, with flood walls installed

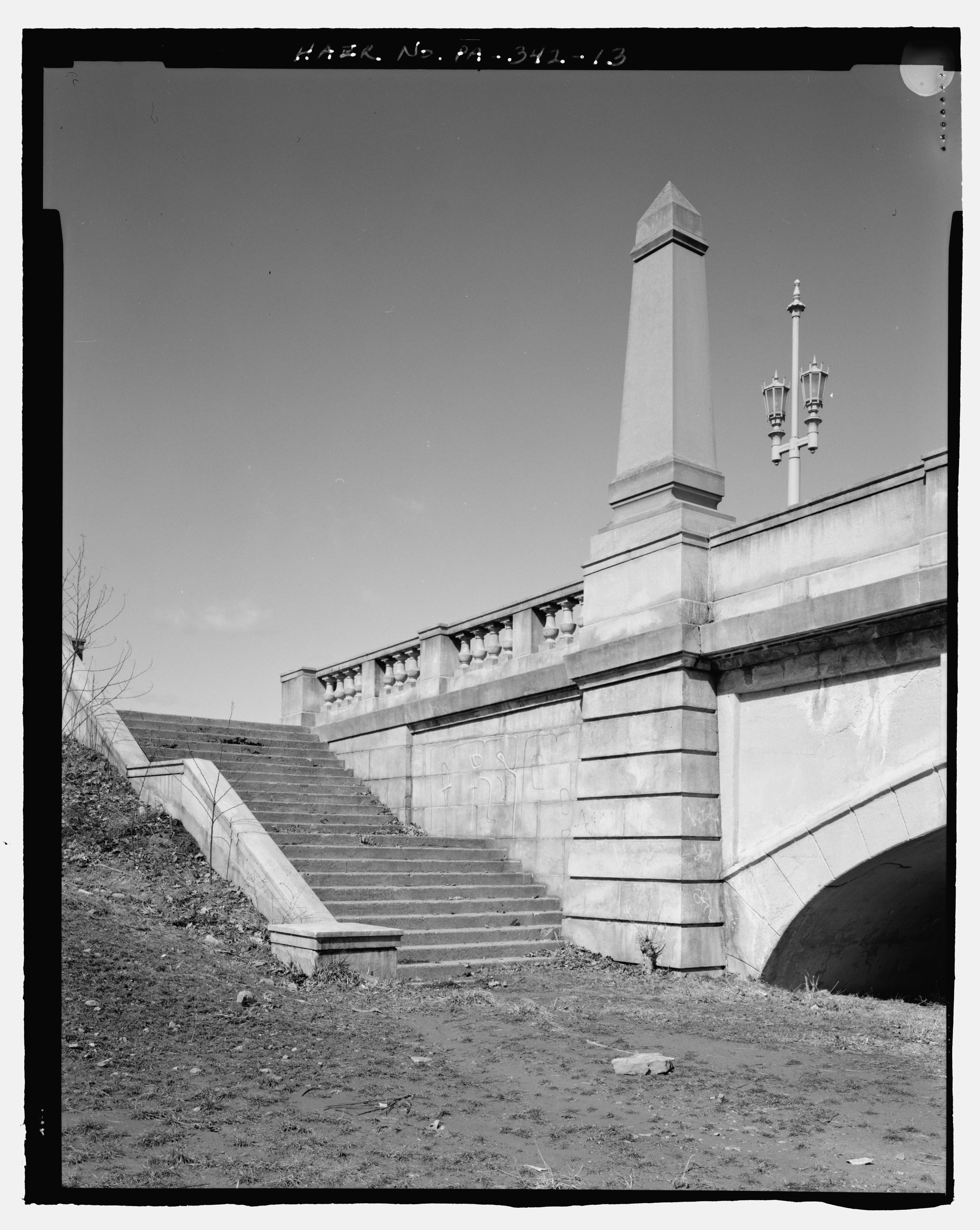
View of stairs and guardrail

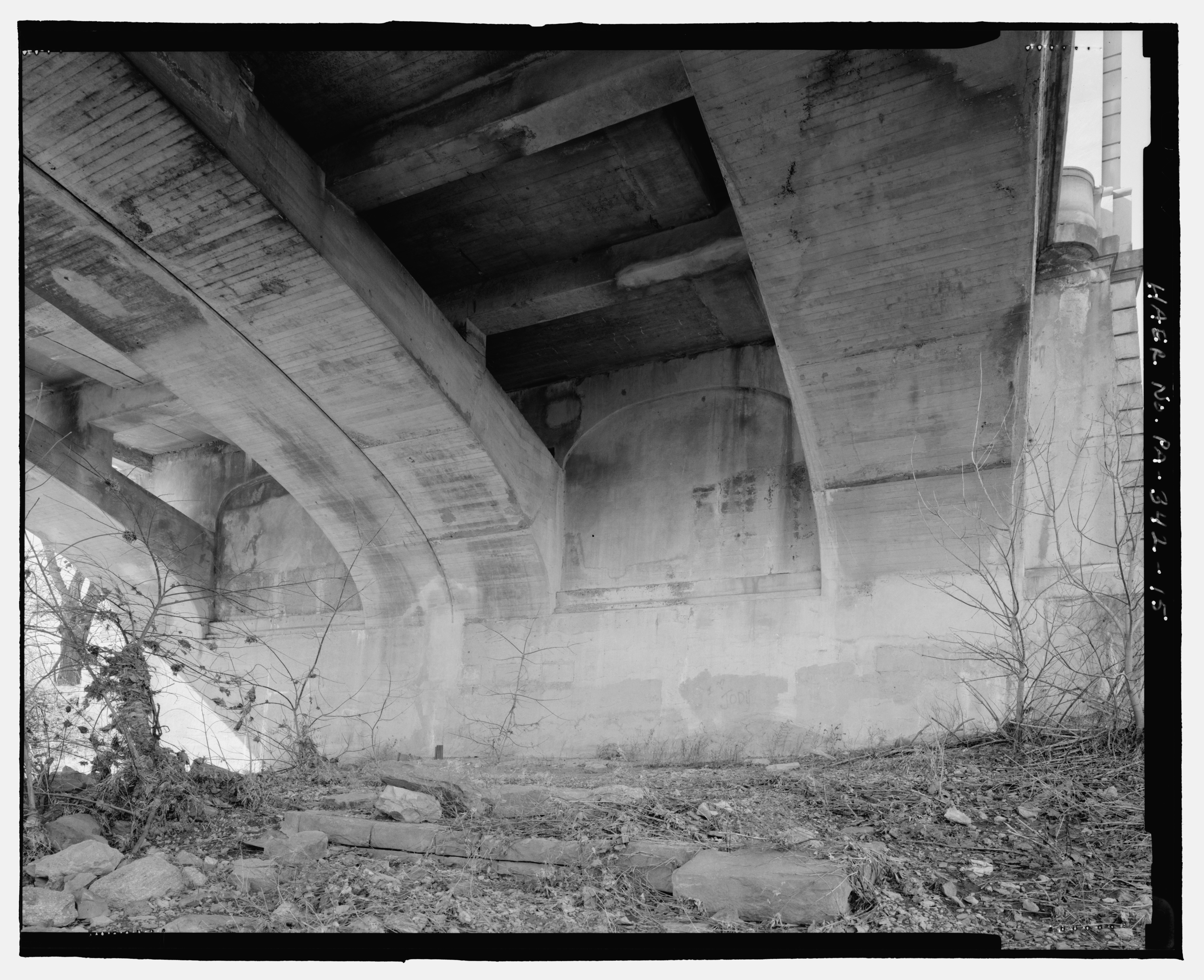
Underside of a span

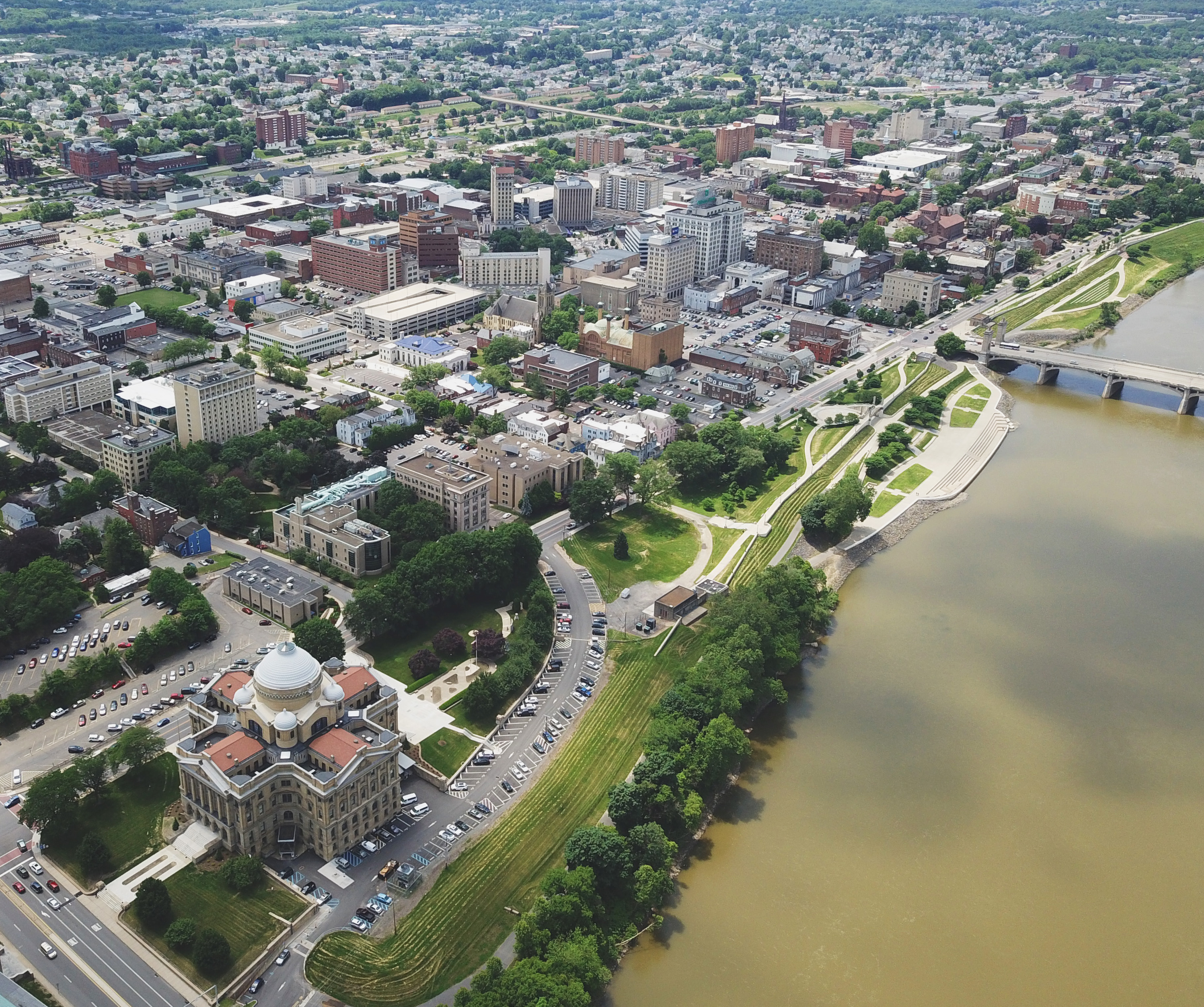
Aerial view of Wilkes-Barre and the Market Street Bridge (seen on right)

== See also ==
- List of bridges documented by the Historic American Engineering Record in Pennsylvania
