= Penn Wells Hotel =

- U.S. Historic district – Contributing property
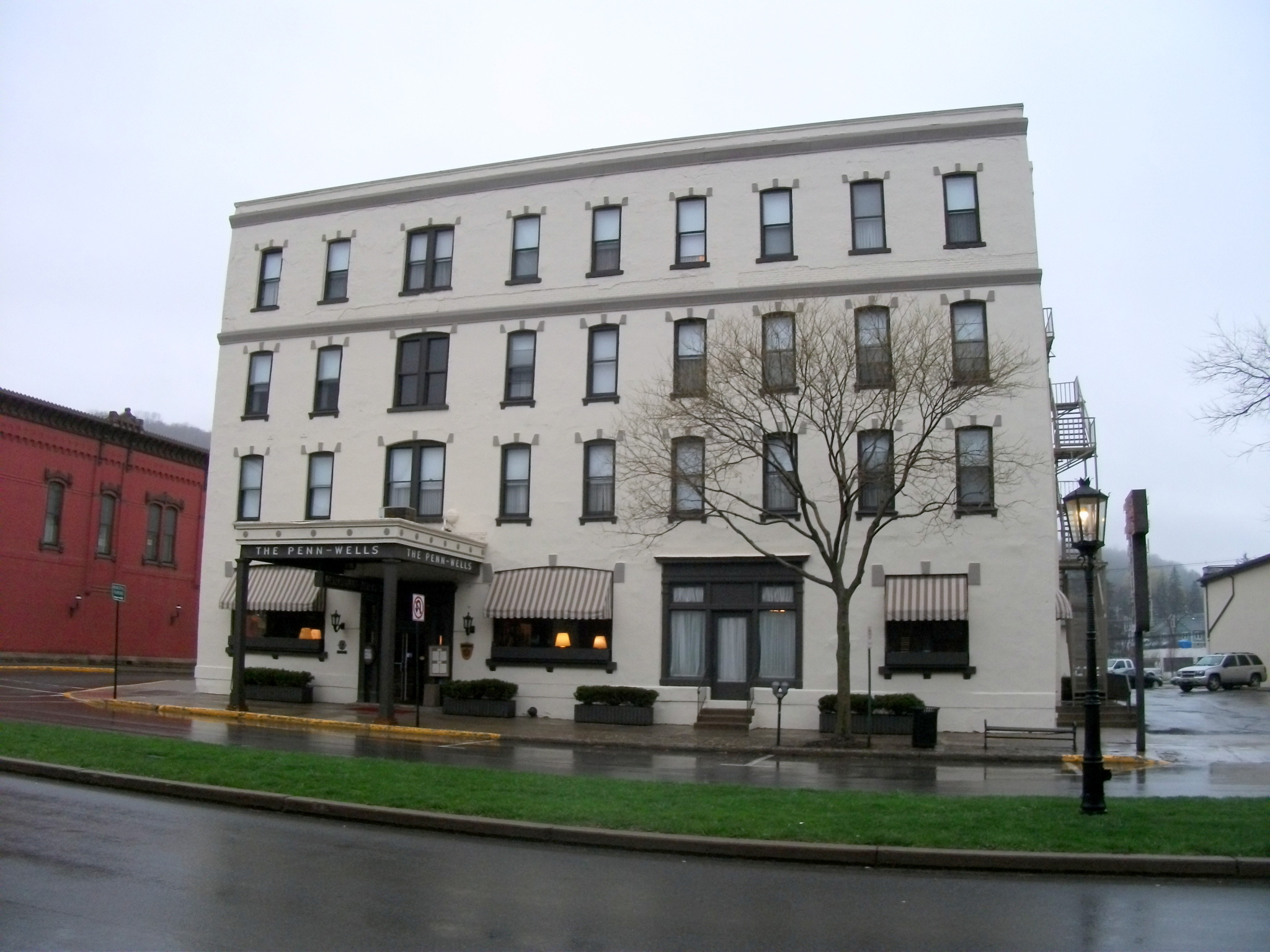

- Location within Pennsylvania Location within the United States
- Location: Wellsboro, Pennsylvania
- Coordinates: 41.7490°N 77.3007°W
- Part of: Wellsboro Historic District (ID04001458)
- Designated CP: January 5, 2005

The Penn Wells Hotel in Wellsboro, Pennsylvania is listed on the National Registry of the Historic Hotels of America, is a contributing building that is part of the Wellsboro Historic District, and is also listed on the National Register of Historic Places.

== History and architectural features ==
This historic structure was built in 1829 and was expanded and renovated in the 1920s. It was damaged by fire in 1906.

Once known as Coles House, "The Penn Wells Hotel sits as the centerpiece of Wellsboro, Pennsylvania's gaslit Main Street historic district."

It is located on Pennsylvania Route 6, which at one time was the Roosevelt Highway, the main route between New York City and Chicago, bringing much business to the hotel.

It is located adjacent to the Art Deco Arcadia Theatre (1921), which is owned by the same company that owns the hotel; the hotel and the theater co-sponsor film festivals.

Dunham's Department Store is located across the street from the hotel. The Dunham family owned the Arcadia Theatre and were instrumental in protecting the Penn Wells Hotel from "extinction."

A contributing building in the Wellsboro Historic District, it is listed on the National Register of Historic Places.

== Gallery ==
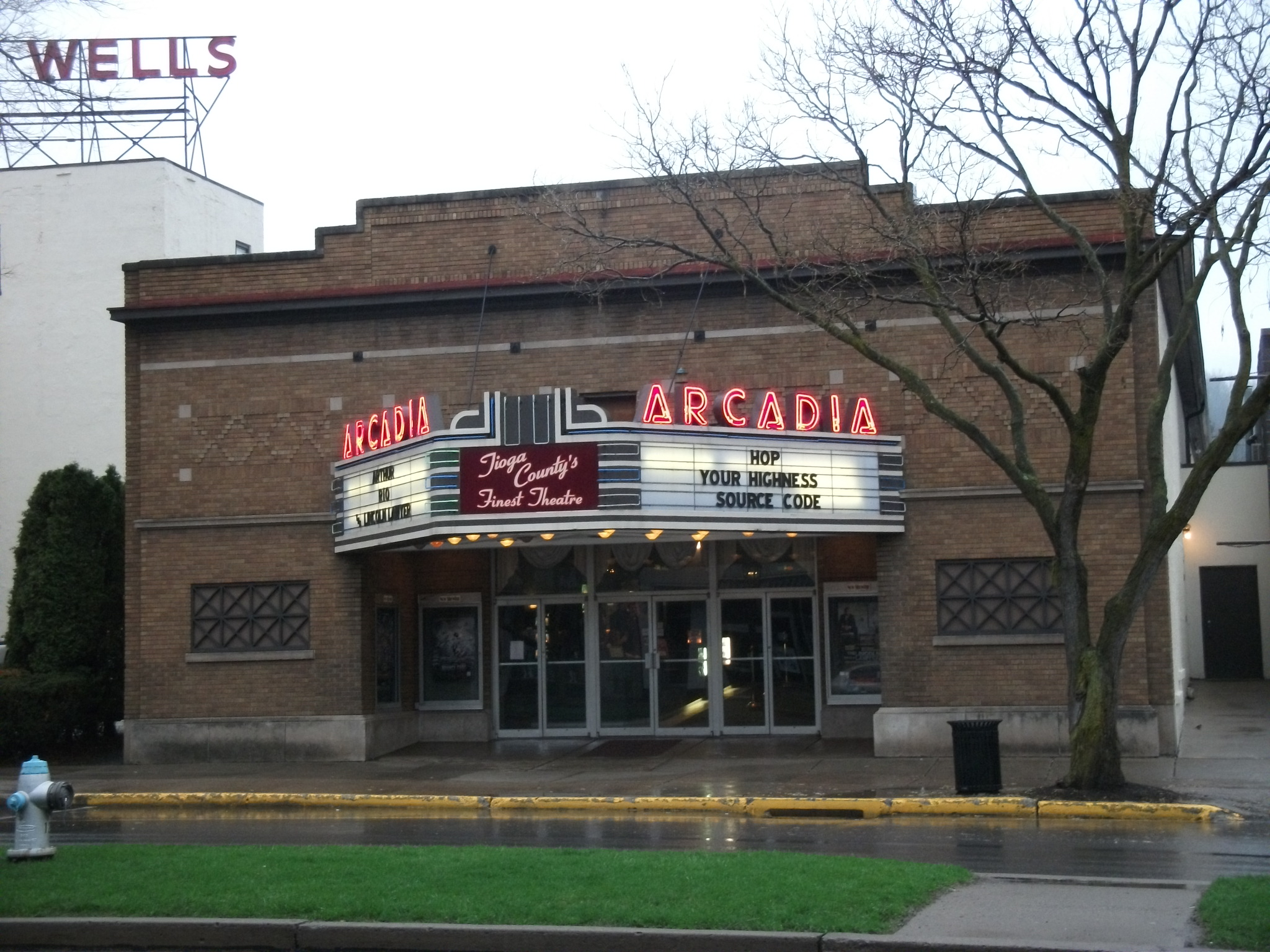
Arcadia Theater
