= WNBT =

WNBT may refer to:

- WNBT-FM, a radio station (104.5 FM) licensed to Wellsboro, Pennsylvania, United States
- WNBC, a television station (channel 4) licensed to New York, New York, United States, which formerly used the call sign WNBT from 1941 to 1954
- WNDA, a radio station (1490 AM) licensed to Wellsboro, Pennsylvania, United States, which formerly used the call sign WNBT from 1955 to 2017
