= Wellsboro Historic District =

Historic district in Pennsylvania, United States

- U.S. National Register of Historic Places
- U.S. Historic district
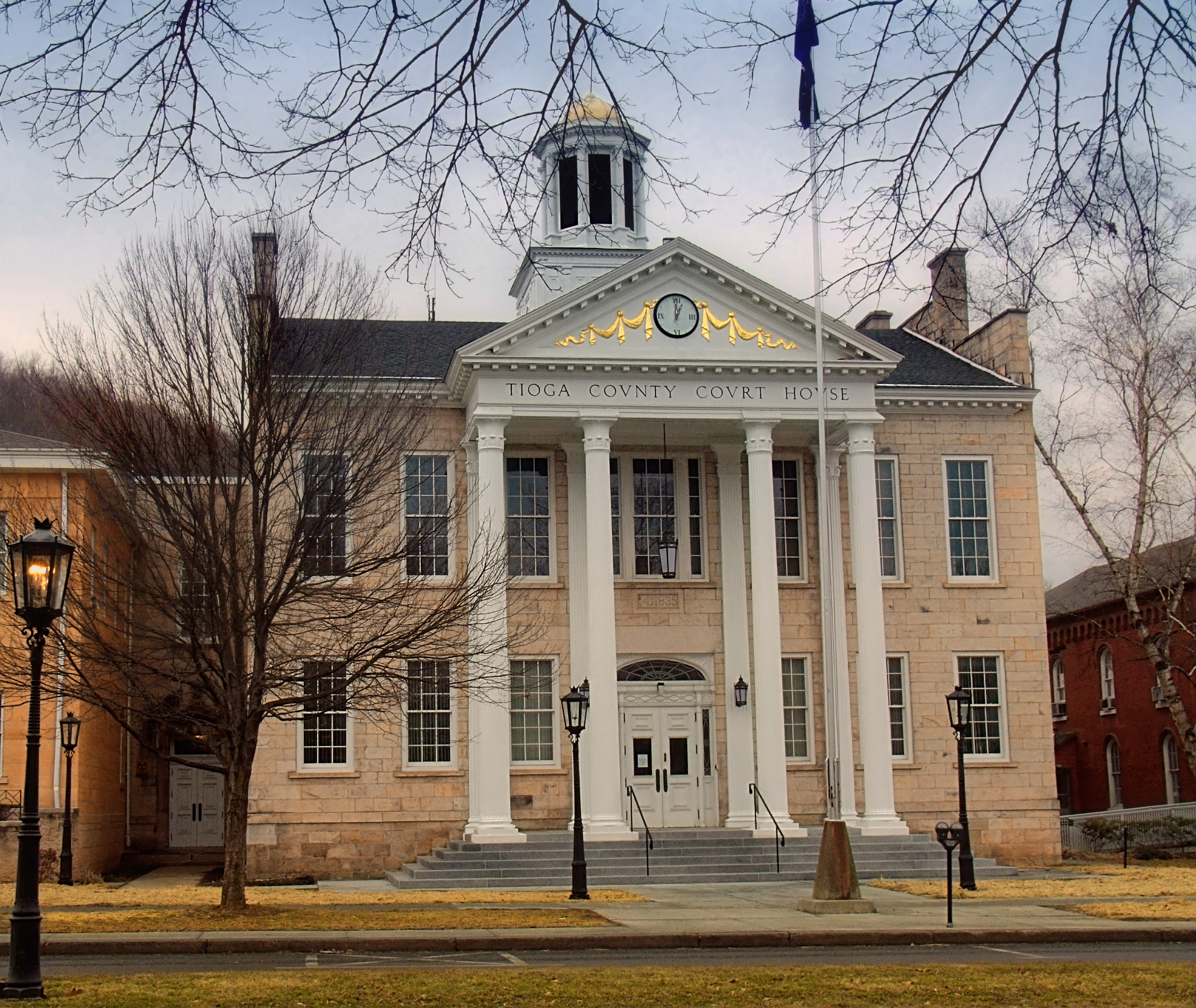
- Tioga County Court House, January 2011

- Location within Pennsylvania Location within the United States
- Location: Roughly bounded by Nichols, Tioga, Charleston, Jackson, East, Bacon, Morris, Sturrock, Meade, Grant, Walnut, Academy, etc., Wellsboro, Pennsylvania
- Coordinates: 41°44′57″N 77°18′5″W
- Area: 360 acres (150 ha)
- Architect: Thomas H. Atherton; William Halsey Wood
- Architectural style: Late Victorian, Late 19th and 20th Century Revivals
- NRHP reference No.: 04001458
- Added to NRHP: January 5, 2005

Wellsboro Historic District, is a national historic district in Wellsboro, Tioga County, Pennsylvania, United States. It includes 531 contributing buildings, three contributing sites, and four contributing objects. It is a 360-acre (1.5 km^{2}) district that is a mixed use commercial / residential / institutional district. The historic structures date from 1835 to the 1950s and include the Tioga County Court House (1835), Arcadia Theater (1924), First Presbyterian Church (1894), Green Free Library, Penn-Wells Hotel (c. 1910), First Presbyterian Church (1894), St. Paul's Episcopal Church (1899), United Methodist Church of Wellsboro (1905), and Wellsboro Diner (1939). Three previously listed properties are also included: the Robinson House, Jesse Robinson House, and Wellsboro Armory.

It was listed on the National Register of Historic Places in 2005.

== See also ==
- National Register of Historic Places listings in Tioga County, Pennsylvania

== Gallery ==
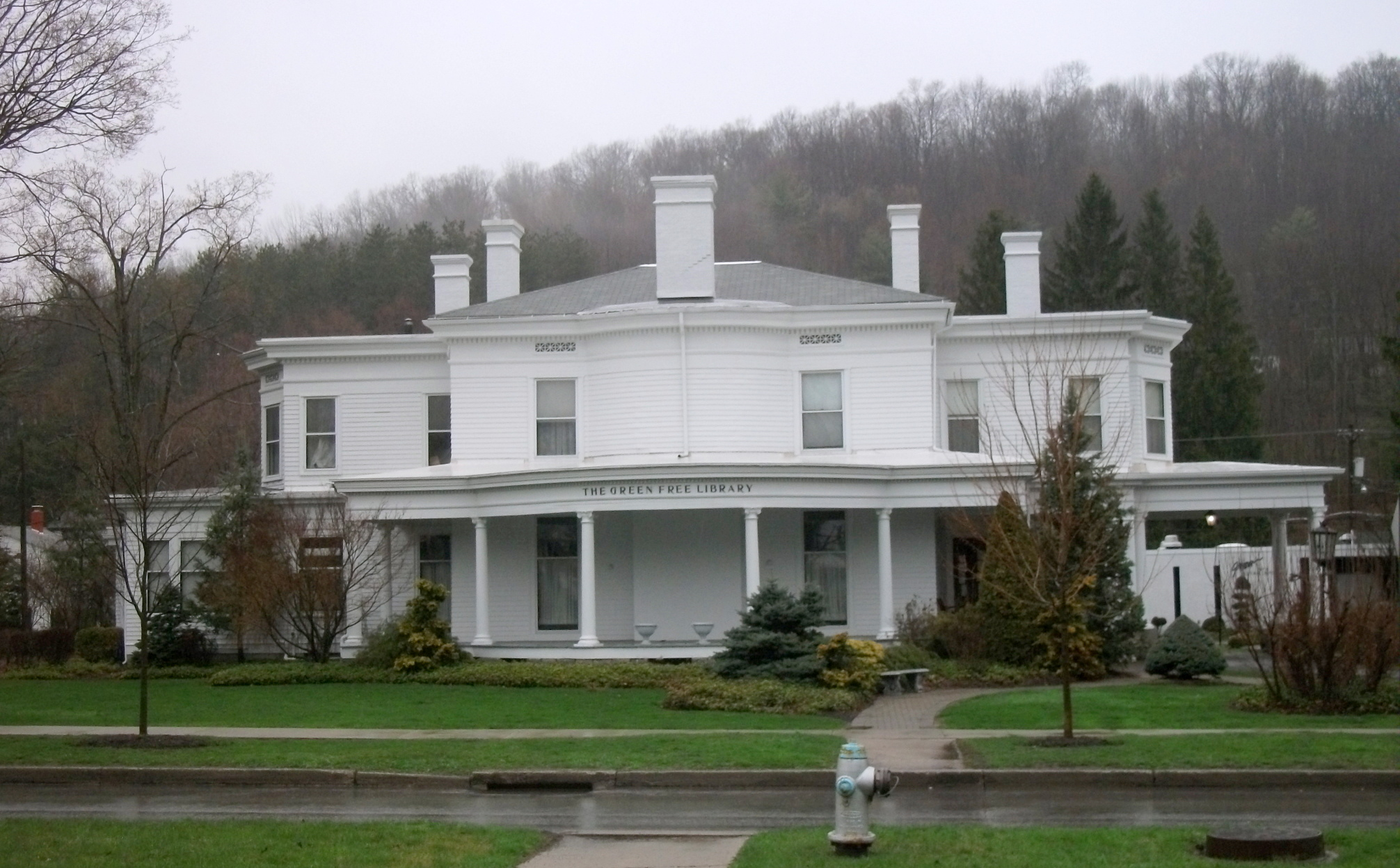
Green Free Library, April 2011

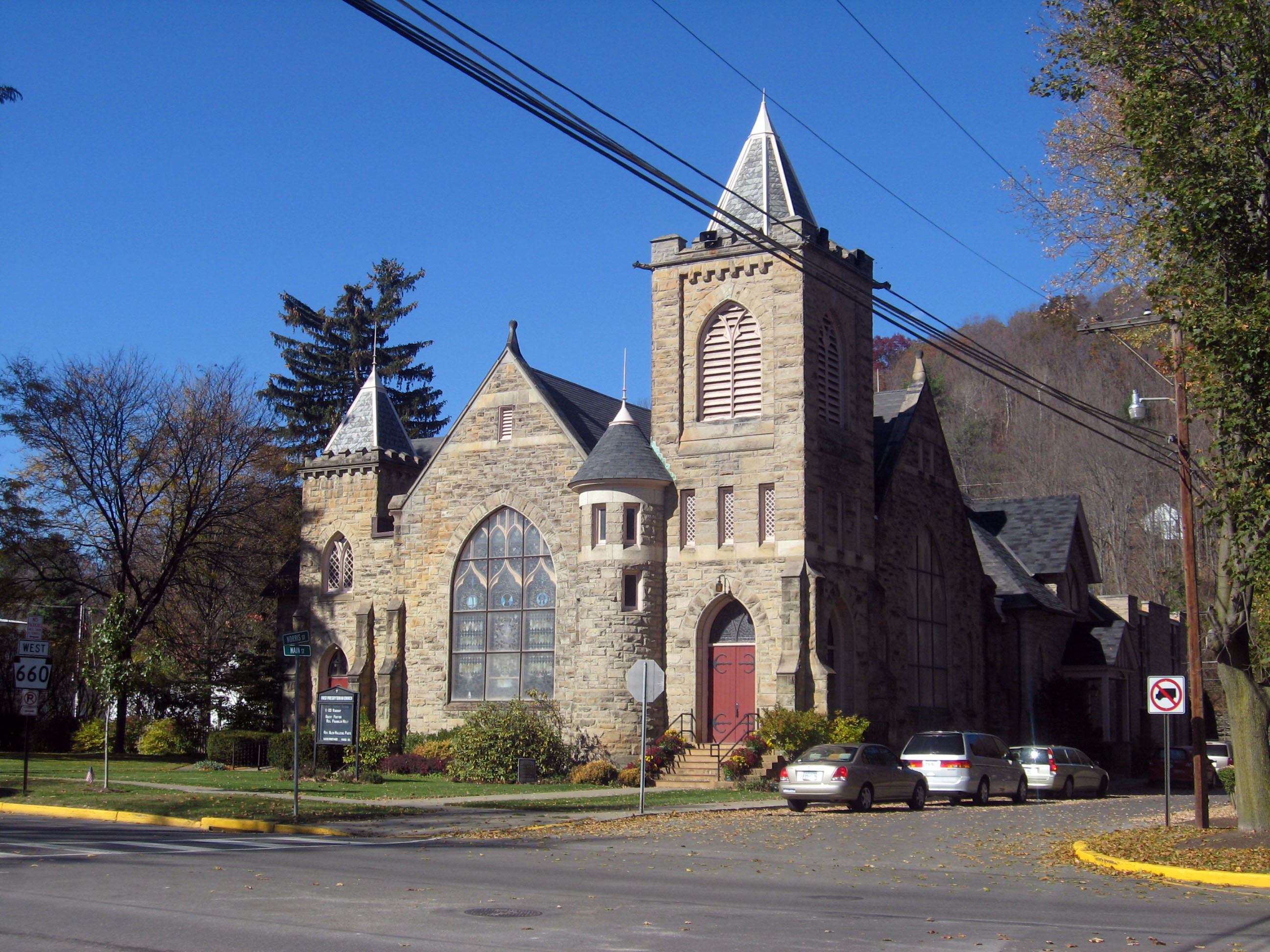
First Presbyterian Church, October 2008

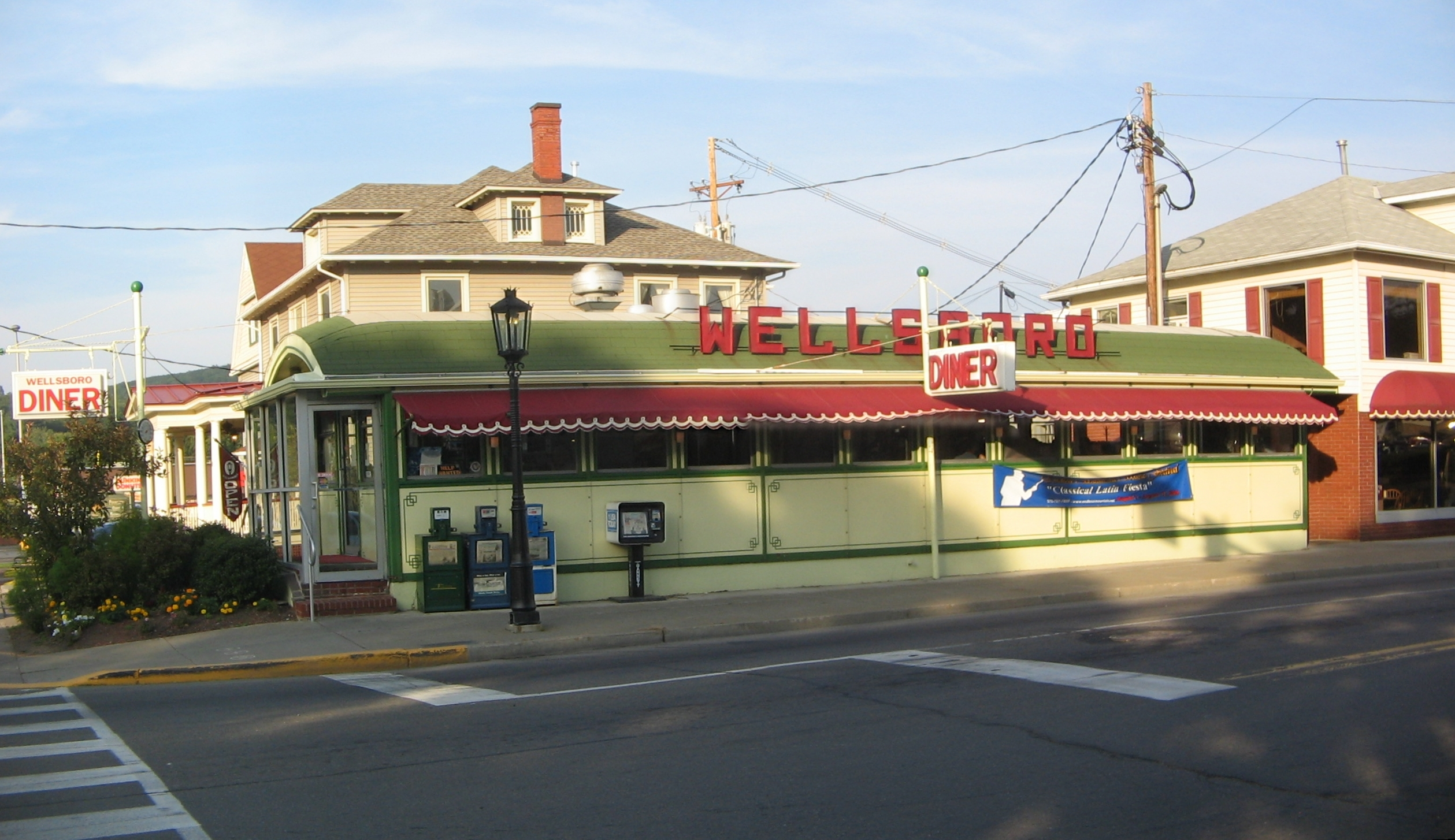
Wellsboro Diner, May 2007

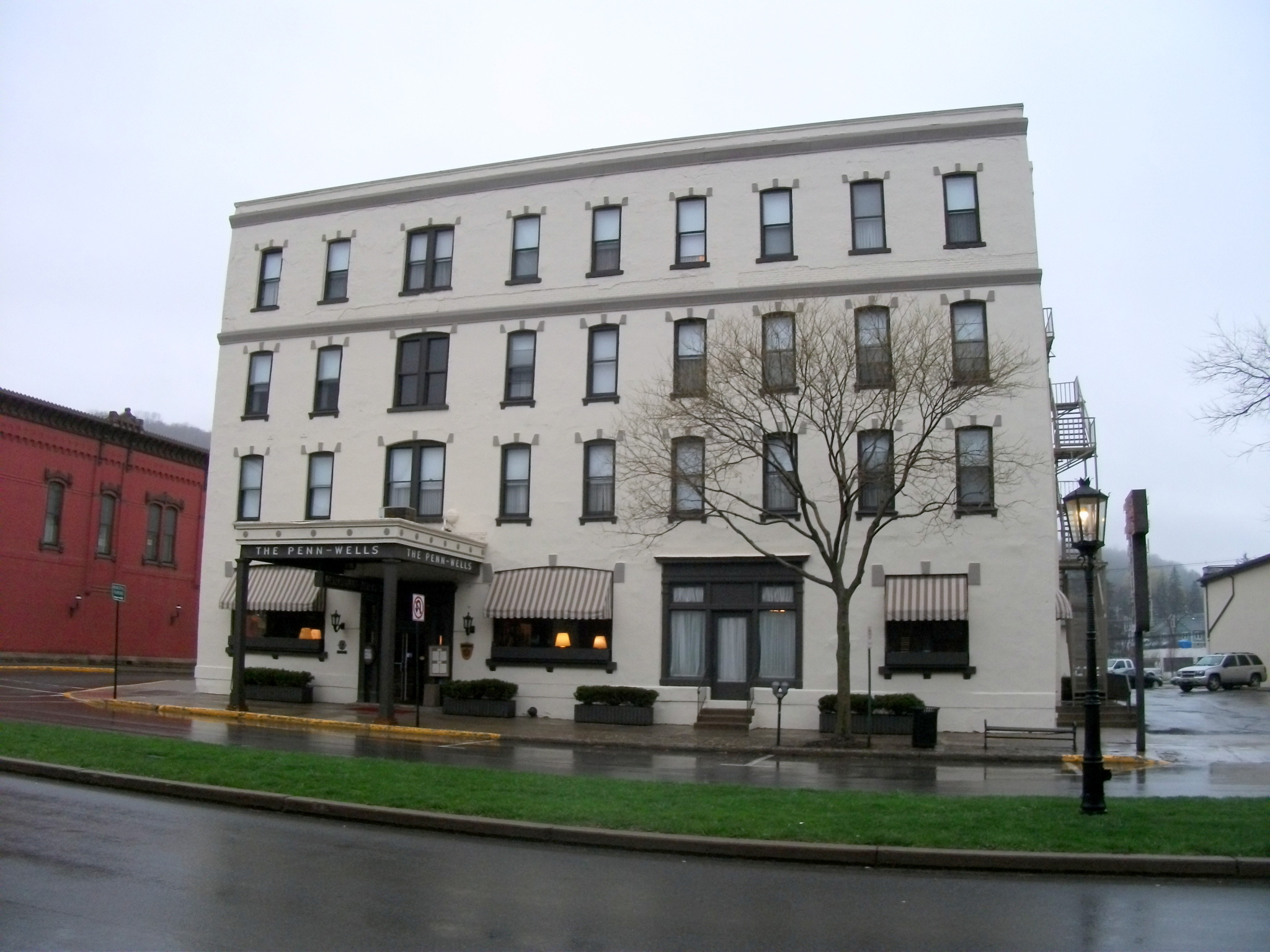
Penn-Wells Hotel, April 2011

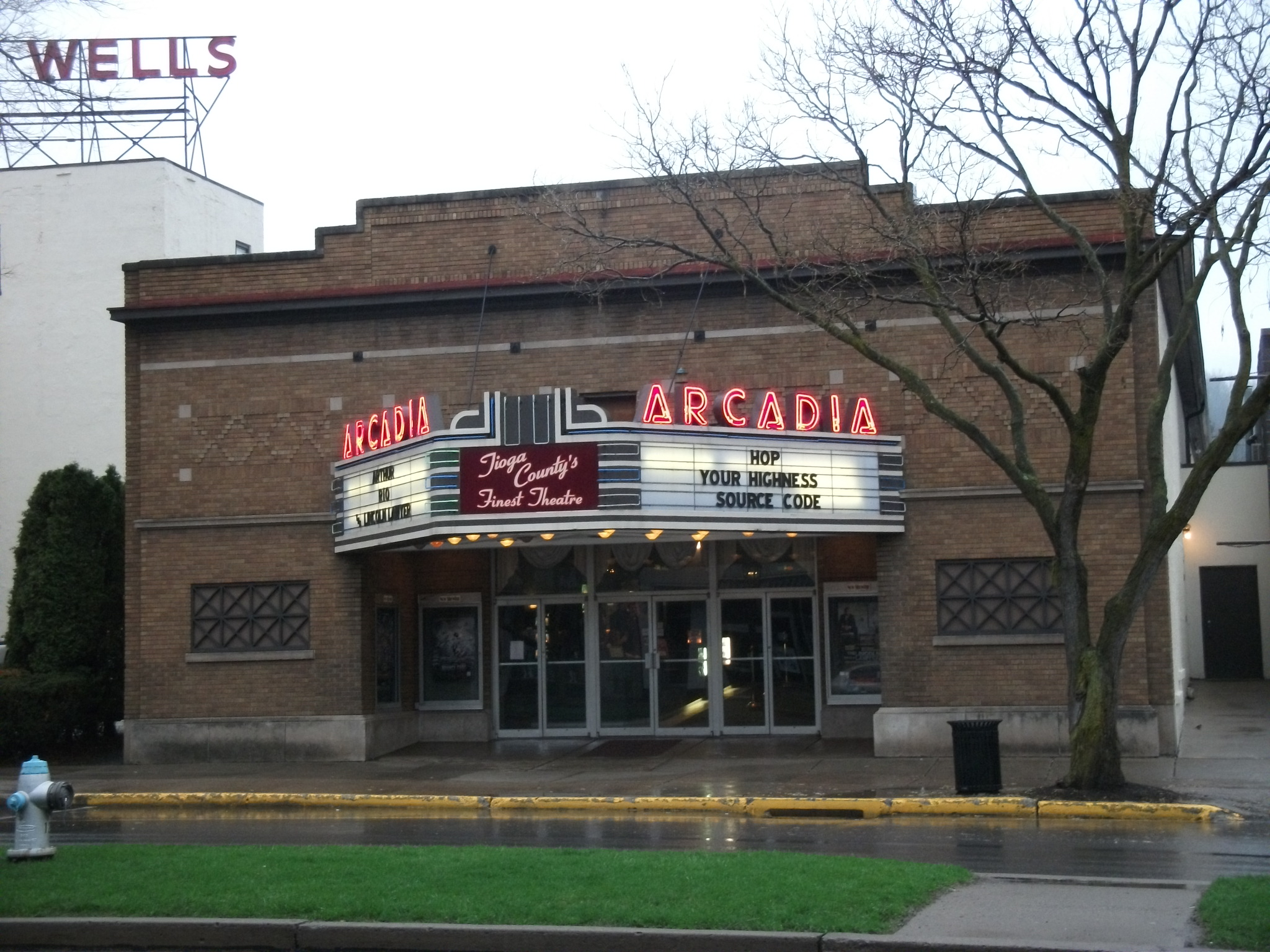
Arcadia Theater, April 2011

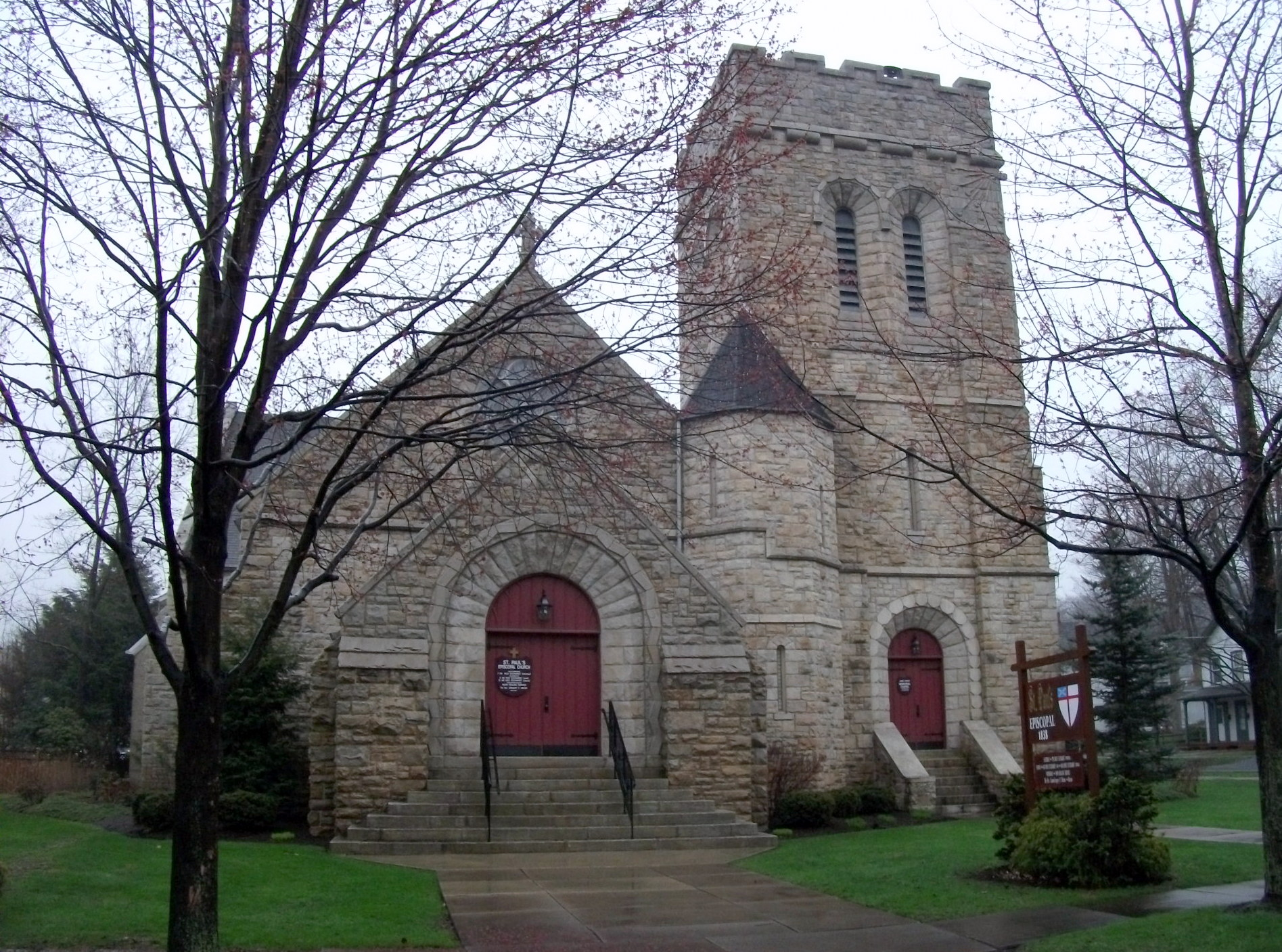
St. Paul's Episcopal Church, April 2011

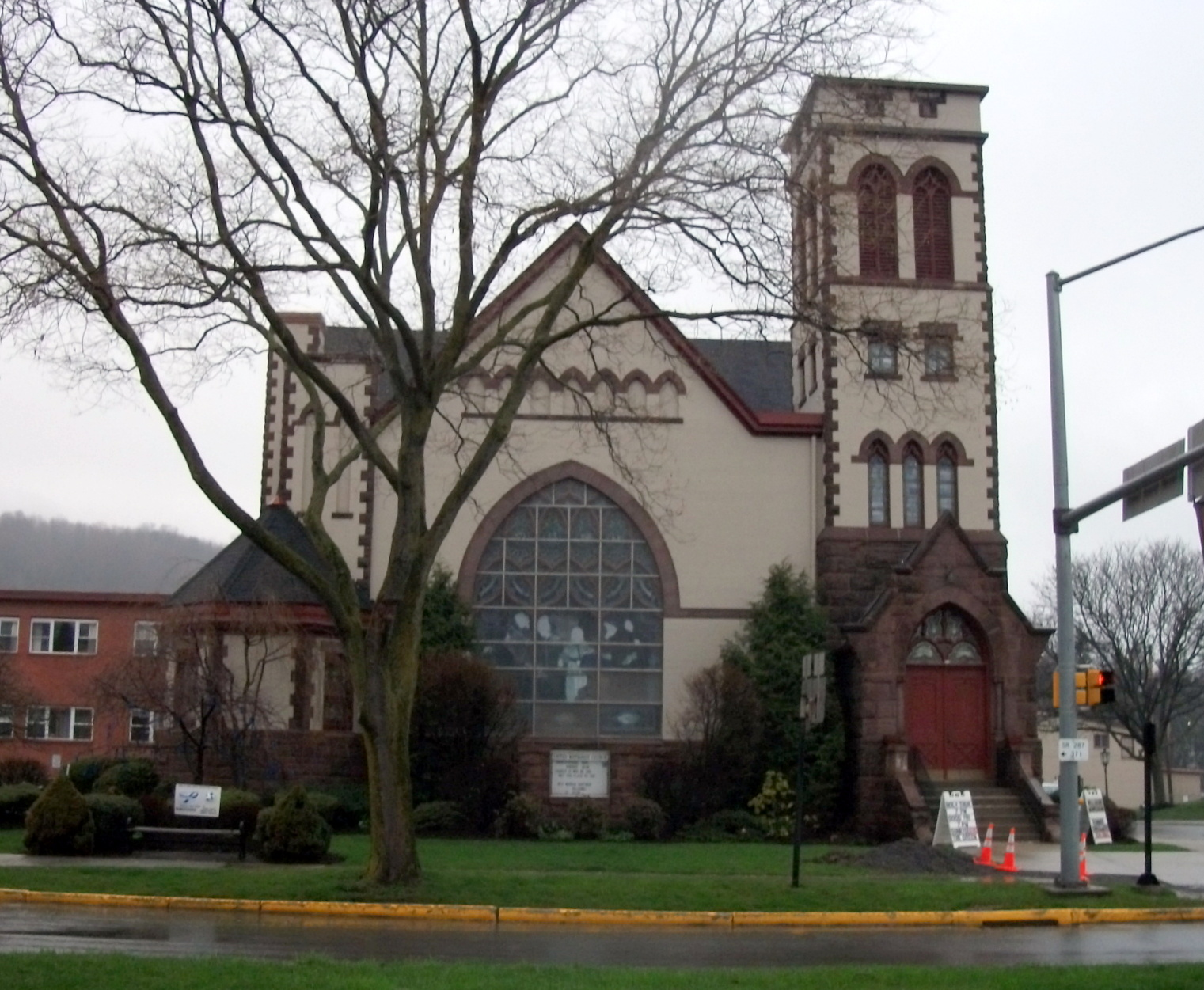
United Methodist Church of Wellsboro, April 2011
