= National Register of Historic Places listings in Tioga County, Pennsylvania =

Location of Tioga County in Pennsylvania

This is a list of the National Register of Historic Places listings in Tioga County, Pennsylvania.

This is intended to be a complete list of the properties and districts on the National Register of Historic Places in Tioga County, Pennsylvania, United States. The locations of National Register properties and districts for which the latitude and longitude coordinates are included below, may be seen in a map.

There are 10 properties and districts listed on the National Register in the county.

This National Park Service list is complete through NPS recent listings posted May 15, 2026.

== Current listings ==
| | Name on the Register | Image | Date listed | Location | City or town | Description |
|---|---|---|---|---|---|---|
| 1 | Blackwell Methodist Episcopal Church | Blackwell Methodist Episcopal Church | September 18, 2013 (#13000746) | 117 Blackwell Square; 41°33′26″N 77°22′48″W | Morris Township | |
| 2 | Colton Point State Park | Colton Point State Park | February 12, 1987 (#87000112) | 5 miles (8.0 km) south of U.S. Route 6 at Ansonia; 41°42′13″N 77°27′51″W | Shippen Township | |
| 3 | James Ford House | James Ford House | December 6, 1975 (#75001667) | Cowanesque Street; 41°59′46″N 77°07′44″W | Lawrenceville | |
| 4 | Mansfield Armory | Mansfield Armory | May 9, 1991 (#91000515) | Smythe Park; 41°48′23″N 77°04′46″W | Mansfield | |
| 5 | Parkhurst Memorial Presbyterian Church | Parkhurst Memorial Presbyterian Church | April 16, 2012 (#12000224) | 302 W. Main St. 41°59′14″N 77°19′01″W | Elkland | |
| 6 | Robinson House | Robinson House | August 3, 1977 (#77001196) | 120 Main Street; 41°44′48″N 77°18′14″W | Wellsboro | |
| 7 | Jesse Robinson House | Jesse Robinson House | February 21, 1991 (#91000089) | 141 Main Street; 41°44′42″N 77°18′16″W | Wellsboro | |
| 8 | Judge John Ryon House | Judge John Ryon House | December 16, 1977 (#77001195) | Main Street; 41°59′41″N 77°07′35″W | Lawrenceville | |
| 9 | Wellsboro Armory | Wellsboro Armory | May 9, 1991 (#91000521) | 2 Central Avenue; 41°44′51″N 77°18′11″W | Wellsboro | |
| 10 | Wellsboro Historic District | Wellsboro Historic District | January 5, 2005 (#04001458) | Roughly bounded by Nichols, Tioga, Charleston, Jackson Streets, East Avenue, Bacon Street, Morris Lane, Sturrock, Meade, Grant, Walnut, Academy Streets, West Avenue, West Water and Highland Streets; 41°44′57″N 77°18′05″W | Wellsboro | |

== See also ==
- List of Pennsylvania state historical markers in Tioga County
