= Charles Hallock =

American author and publisher

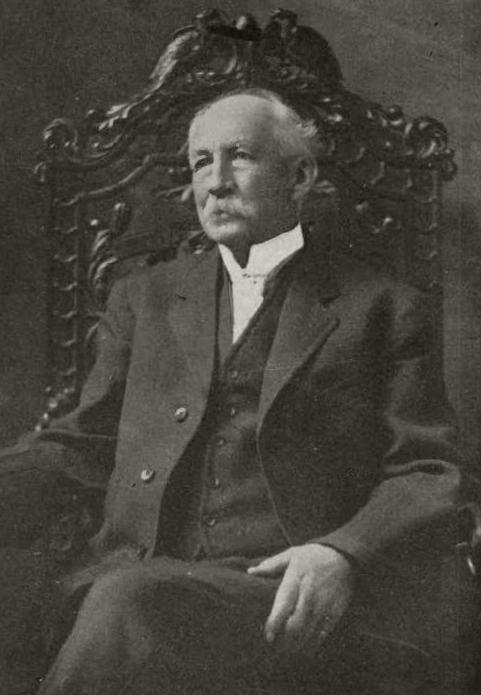
Charles Hallock in his autobiography-An Angler's Reminiscences. A Record of Sport, Travel and Adventure

Charles Hallock (March 13, 1834 – December 2, 1917) was an American author and publisher born in New York City to Gerard Hallock and Elizabeth Allen. On September 10, 1855 he married Amelia J. Wardell.

He studied at Yale, 1850–51, and Amherst College. He was assistant editor of the New Haven Register, 1854–56; proprietor and associate editor of the New York Journal of Commerce, of which his father was editor, 1856-62. He was founder and publisher, from 1873–80, of Forest and Stream, which was later incorporated into its main competitor Field and Stream.

He experimented in Sunflower cultivation, using the seed for oil; in sheep raising on Indian reservations; in establishing a reservation for sportsmen in Minnesota; in the development of Alaska and Florida, and of special industries in North Carolina; and in various other sanitary and economic schemes.

He originated the code of uniform game laws and incorporated with Fayette S. Giles and others the first great American game preserve at Blooming Grove, Pike County, Pennsylvania

Hallock, Minnesota was named after him.

== Works ==
- Recluse of the Oconee 1854
- Life of Stonewall Jackson 1863
- The Fishing Tourist 1873 Online Version
- Camp Life in Florida 1875 Online Version
- The Sportsman's Gazetteer 1877 Online Version
- Vacation Rambles in Michigan 1877
- American Club List and Glossary 1878
- Our New Alaska 1886
- The Salmon Fisher 1890 Online Version
- Origin of the American indigenes 1902
- Luminous Bodies Here and Hereafter 1906 Online Version
- An Angler's Reminiscences. A Record of Sport, Travel and Adventure. With Autobiography of the Author 1913 Online Version
