= WZBF =

WZBF may refer to:

- WZBF (FM), a radio station (96.9 FM) licensed to serve Ridgebury, Pennsylvania, United States
- WNNA, a radio station (106.1 FM) licensed to serve Beaver Springs, Pennsylvania, which held the call sign WZBF from 2015 to 2018
