= List of Pennsylvania state historical markers in Tioga County =

Location of Tioga County in Pennsylvania

This is a list of the Pennsylvania state historical markers in Tioga County.

This is intended to be a complete list of the official state historical markers placed in Tioga County, Pennsylvania by the Pennsylvania Historical and Museum Commission (PHMC). The locations of the historical markers, as well as the latitude and longitude coordinates as provided by the PHMC's database, are included below when available. There are 15 historical markers located in Tioga County.

== Historical markers ==
| Marker title | Image | Date dedicated | Location | Marker type | Topics |
| Blossburg Coal | | July 25, 1987 | Pa. 287, 3.5 miles N of Morris; 41.64056°N 77.30079°W | Roadside | Business & Industry, Coal |
| Civilian Conservation Corps | | June 3, 1995 | Leonard Harrison State Park, Wellsboro; 41.69666°N 77.45168°W | Roadside | Business & Industry, Environment, Government & Politics, Government & Politics 20th Century, Roads |
| Coal Discovery | | n/a | U.S. 15 just S of Blossburg (Missing) | Roadside | Business & Industry, Coal, Environment |
| Corning & Blossburg Railroad | | June 4, 1983 | S. Main St. (Business U.S. 15), Mansfield; 41.8049°N 77.07753°W | City | Canals, Coal, Navigation, Railroads, Transportation |
| Nessmuk | | October 10, 1972 | Courthouse Square, Pa. 660, Wellsboro; 41.74671°N 77.30219°W | Roadside | Environment, Writers |
| Nessmuk | | n/a | End of Pa. 660, Leonard Harrison State Park; 41.69487°N 77.45433°W | Roadside | Environment, Writers |
| Pine Creek Path | | November 2, 1951 | Grand Army of Republic Hwy. (US 6) near Rt. 362 junction, at Ansonia; 41.74883°N 77.42421°W | Roadside | Environment, Native American, Paths & Trails, Transportation |
| Rural Electrification | | October 24, 1986 | N. Main St. (Business U.S. 15), Mansfield; 41.8078°N 77.07818°W | Roadside | Agriculture, Business & Industry, Electricity |
| Sheshequin Path | | August 4, 1948 | Pa. 14, 3.6 miles NE of Roaring Branch (Missing) | Roadside | Early Settlement, Native American, Paths & Trails, Transportation |
| Tioga County | | March 26, 1982 | Courthouse Square, Pa. 287 & 660, Wellsboro; 41.71687°N 77.30314°W | City | Government & Politics, Government & Politics 19th Century, Native American |
| William A. Stone | | September 1, 1948 | Courthouse Square, Central Ave. (PA 287) & Main St. (PA 660), Wellsboro; 41.74723°N 77.30209°W | Roadside | Government & Politics, Government & Politics 19th Century, Governors, Professions & Vocations |
| William A. Stone | | September 1, 1948 | Pa. 362, 3.5 miles SW of Wellsboro; 41.73165°N 77.38037°W | Roadside | Government & Politics, Government & Politics 19th Century, Governors, Professions & Vocations |
| William B. Wilson | | October 29, 1948 | U.S. 15 just S of Blossburg; 41.66778°N 77.07787°W | Roadside | Coal, Ethnic & Immigration, Government & Politics, Government & Politics 20th Century, Labor |
| Williamson Road | | July 20, 1953 | Business U.S. 15 S of Mansfield at Canoe Camp (Missing); 41.78296°N 77.06973°W | Roadside | Labor, Roads, Transportation |
| Williamson Road | | July 25, 1947 | SR 2005 (old U.S. 15) S of Liberty; 41.55901°N 77.10533°W | Roadside | Labor, Roads, Transportation |

== See also ==
- List of Pennsylvania state historical markers
- National Register of Historic Places listings in Tioga County, Pennsylvania
