= James Lowrey =

American lawyer and politician

James Lowrey (September 10, 1802 – November 30, 1875) was an American lawyer and Democratic politician.

Lowrey, youngest child of Daniel and Anna (Munson) Lowrey, was born in that part of Farmington which is now Plainville, Connecticut., September 10, 1802.

He graduated from Yale College in 1824. He went to Wellsboro, Pennsylvania., as the principal of the academy, and there studied law, and entered into partnership with Hon. Ellis Lewis. He served as a Democratic member of the Pennsylvania House of Representatives for the sessions of 1853 and 1854, representing Tioga County. He retired from the practice of law several years before his death, and removed to Burlington, New Jersey, where he died November 30, 1875, aged 73 years.

In 1830, he married Mary W. Morris (daughter of Samuel Wells Morris), who survived him.
