= WNBQ =

WNBQ may refer to:

- WOGA (FM), a radio station (92.3 FM) licensed to serve Mansfield, Pennsylvania, United States, which held the call sign WNBQ from 1998 to 2016
- WMAQ-TV, a television station (channel 5) licensed to serve Chicago, Illinois, United States, which held the call sign WNBQ from 1948 to 1964
