= Mary Wells Morris =

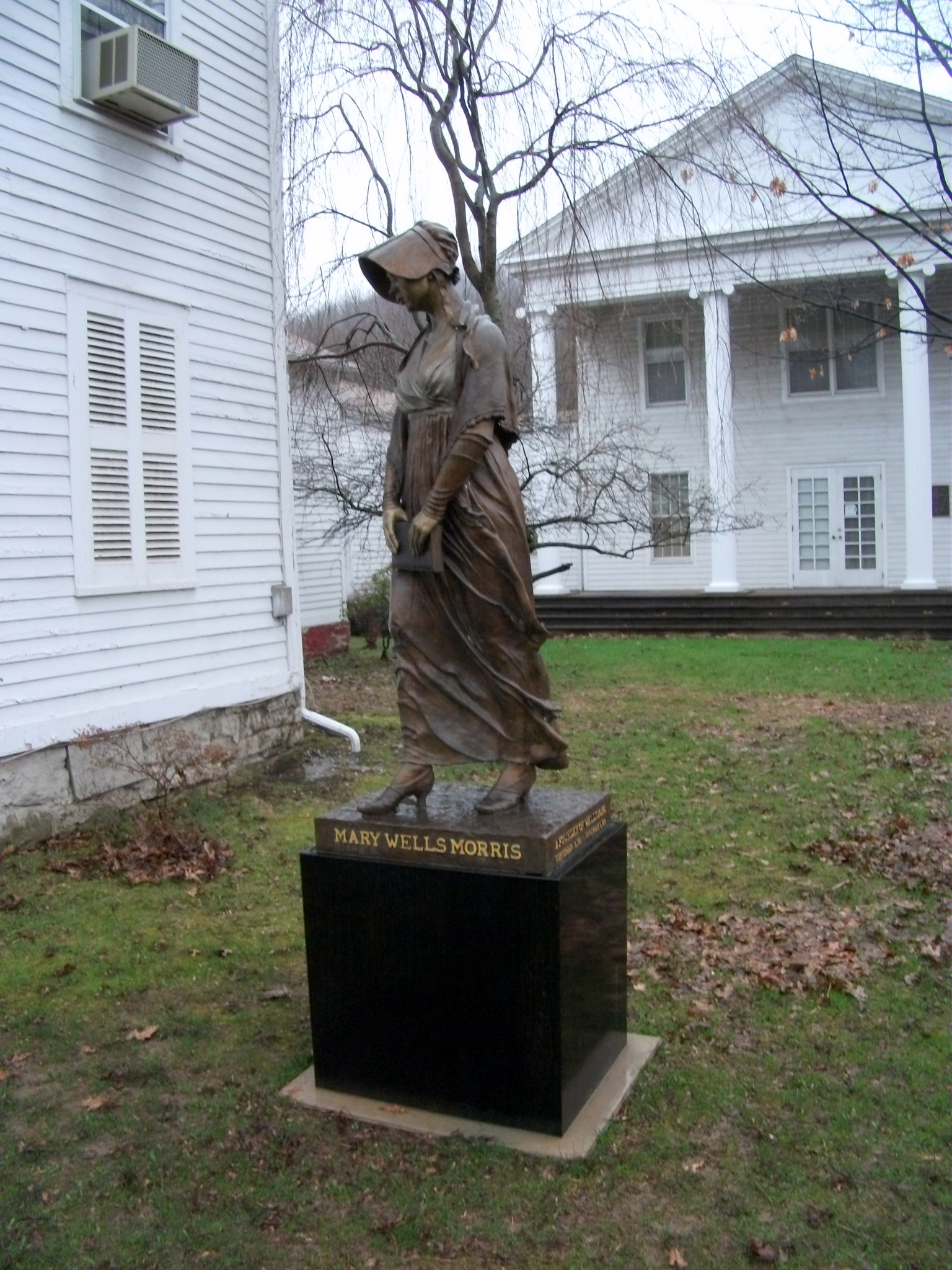
Wellsboro, Pennsylvania, statue of Mary Wells Morris, April 2011

Mary Wells Morris (September 4, 1764 – November 6, 1819) is the person after whom Wellsboro, Pennsylvania is named. She was born in Burlington County, New Jersey. She moved to Tioga County with her husband Benjamin, her son Samuel, and her daughter Rebecca. They were Philadelphia Quakers. They became the first residents of the Wellsboro. She remained in Wellsboro until she died on November 6, 1819; she is buried with her husband in the Wellsboro Cemetery.

In 2009, a life-size bronze statue was erected in her honor. Despite not finding any remaining images of Mary Wells, the designers of the statue crafted a likeness based on surviving images of her mother.
