= Benjamin Franklin Bush =

American railroad executive

- Born: July 5, 1860; Wellsboro, Pennsylvania, United States
- Died: July 28, 1927 (aged 67)
- Resting place: Bellefontaine Cemetery
- Education: Mansfield State Normal School
- Occupation: Businessperson (railroad executive)

Benjamin Franklin Bush (July 5, 1860 – July 28, 1927) was an American railroad executive. At various times he served as the president of the Missouri Pacific Railroad, the St. Louis, Iron Mountain and Southern Railway (later part of the Missouri Pacific), the Western Maryland Railway, the Denver and Rio Grande Western Railroad, and the Western Pacific Railroad.

His entry in the 1913 edition of The Biographical Directory of the Railway Officials of America reads:

"President, Missouri Pacific; St. Louis, Iron Mountain and Southern; Denver and Rio Grande.
Office: St. Louis, Missouri.
Born: July 5, 1860, at Wellsboro, Pennsylvania.
Education: Public schools, Wellsboro, Pennsylvania, and State Normal School, Mansfield, Pennsylvania.
Entered railway service: 1882, as rodman on the Northern Pacific, since which he has been consecutively locating and division engineer, same road; 1887 to 1889, division engineer, Union Pacific; 1889 to 1896, chief engineer and general superintendent, Oregon Improvement Company, controlling coal properties of Northern Pacific; February, 1903, to 1907, fuel agent, Missouri Pacific; 1907 to 1908, president, Western Maryland; 1908, appointed receiver, same road, and upon reorganization again elected president; May 1, 1911, to date, president, Missouri Pacific; St. Louis, Iron Mountain and Southern; January 4, 1912, to date, also president, Denver and Rio Grande."

The village of Bush, Illinois, is named in his honor.

== See also ==
- List of people from St. Louis, Missouri
- List of people from Pennsylvania
- List of railroad executives
