= Benjamin Wistar Morris (colonist) =

Benjamin Wistar Morris (sometimes spelled "Wister"; 1762–1825) was the founder of Wellsboro, Pennsylvania. Samuel Wells Morris, Morris' son, was a member of the U.S. House of Representatives. His grandson was Episcopal bishop Benjamin Wistar Morris II, and his great grandson was Benjamin Wistar Morris III, a noted architect.

Morris was the son of Captain Samuel and Rebecca (Wistar) Morris. Benjamin Morris, an agent of the Pine Creek Land Company, settled in Tioga County, Pennsylvania about 1805 with his wife Mary Wells Morris. Wellsboro may have been named in honor of Mary or a member of Mary's family. William Wells, Mary's brother, was a leader of the land company for whom Benjamin worked. At the time they settled in the county, the Morris' log house was the only home in what is now the borough of Wellsboro.
