= Judge John Ryon House =

Historic house in Pennsylvania, United States

- U.S. National Register of Historic Places
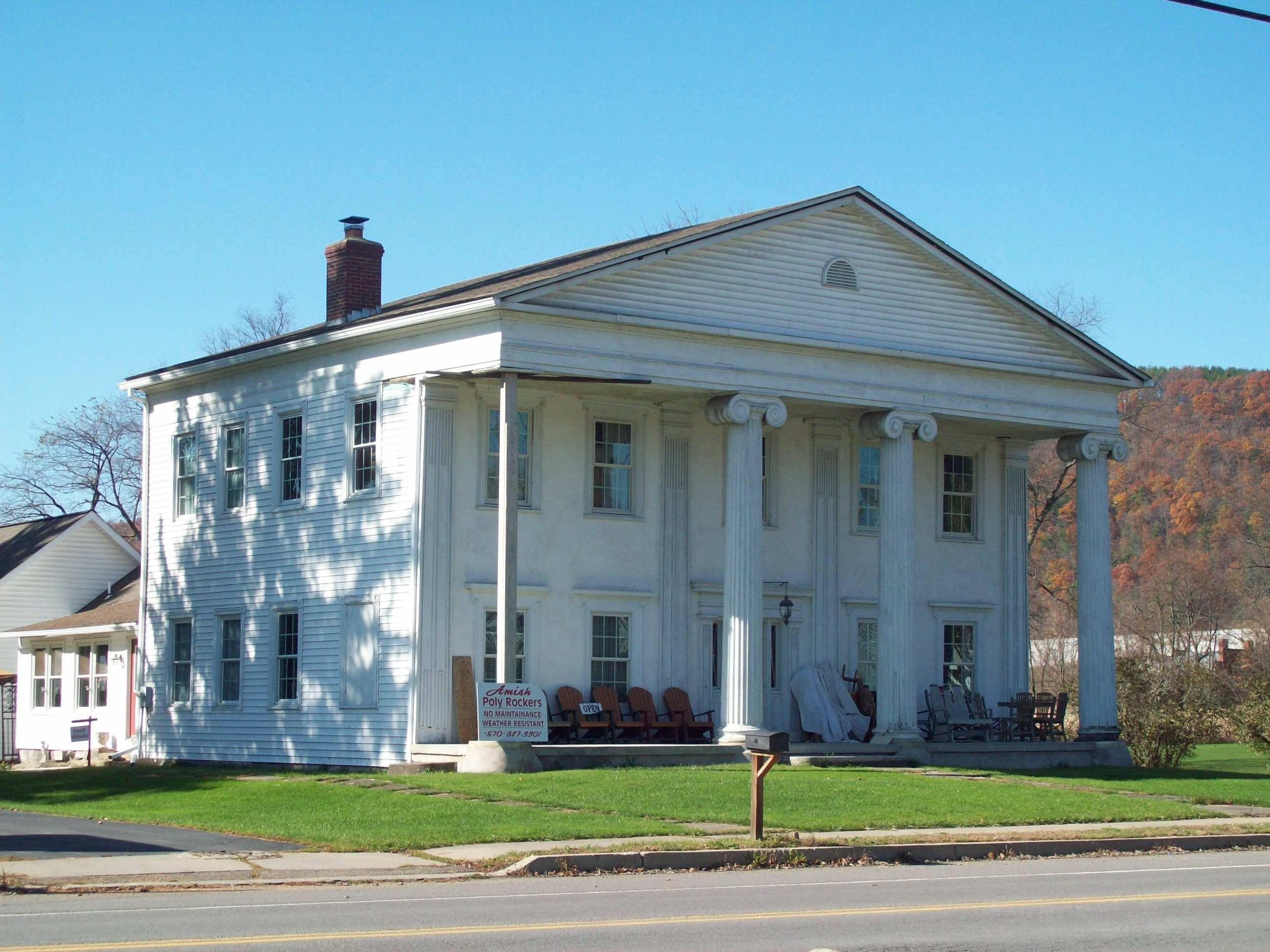
- Judge John Ryon House, October 2009

- Location within Pennsylvania Location within the United States
- Location: Main St., Lawrenceville, Pennsylvania
- Coordinates: 41°59′41″N 77°7′35″W
- Area: 0.5 acres (0.20 ha)
- Built: 1840
- Architectural style: Greek Revival
- NRHP reference No.: 77001195
- Added to NRHP: December 16, 1977

Judge John Ryon House, or Judge Ira Kilbourne House, is a historic home located at Lawrenceville in Tioga County, Pennsylvania. It is a two-story Greek Revival style house built in 1840. It features a two-story portico with three full fluted Ionic columns and one somewhat less fluted column.

It was listed on the National Register of Historic Places in 1977.

== See also ==
- National Register of Historic Places listings in Tioga County, Pennsylvania
