= Bush, Illinois =

Bush
- Village
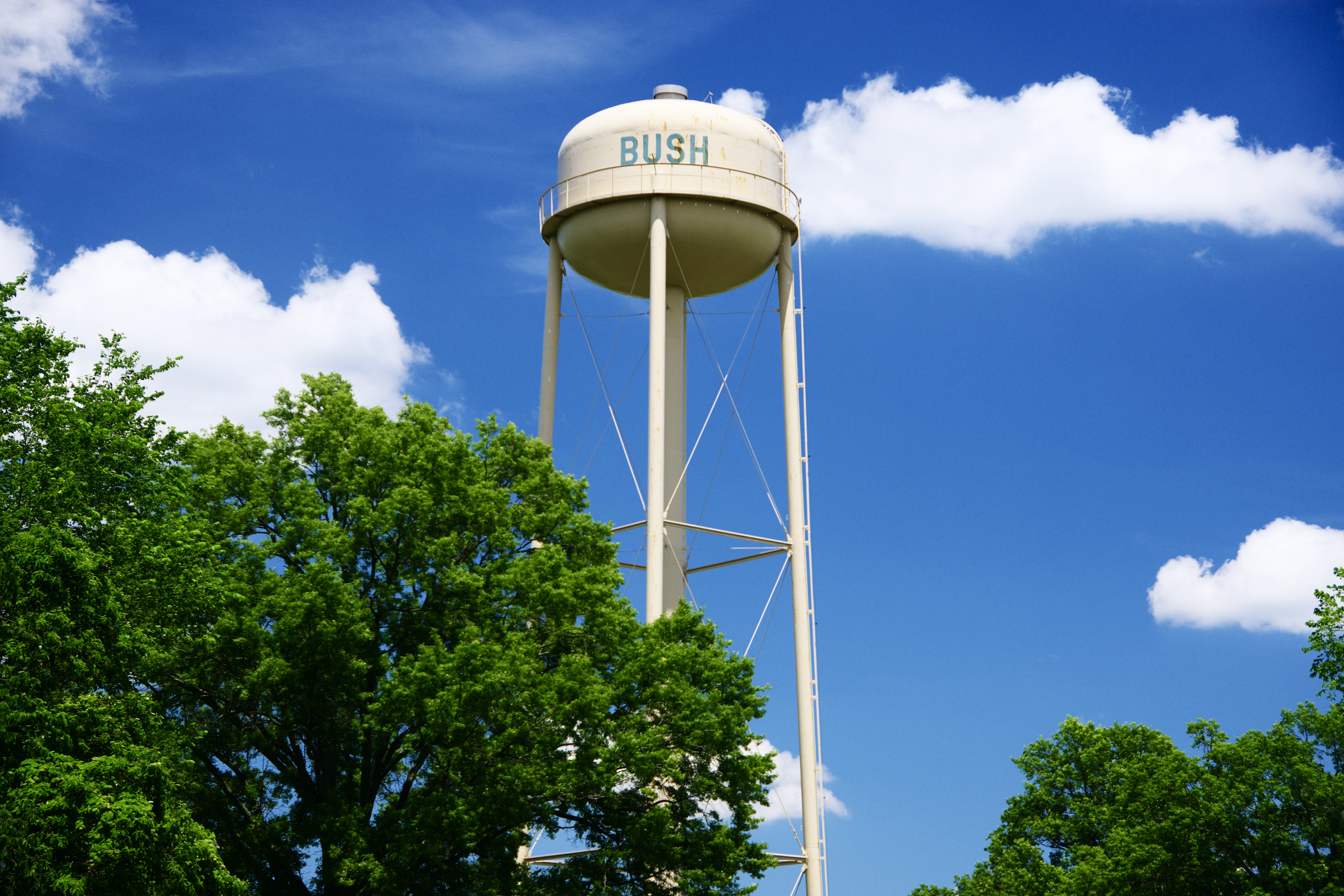
- Bush Water tower

- Location of Bush in Williamson County, Illinois.
- Coordinates: 37°50′36″N 89°07′36″W
- Country: United States
- State: Illinois
- County: Williamson

Area
  - Total: 0.46 sq mi (1.19 km^{2})
  - Land: 0.46 sq mi (1.18 km^{2})
  - Water: 0.0077 sq mi (0.02 km^{2})
- Elevation: 400 ft (120 m)

Population (2020)
  - Total: 241
  - Density: 529.9/sq mi (204.59/km^{2})
- Time zone: UTC-6 (CST)
  - Summer (DST): UTC-5 (CDT)
- ZIP Code: 62924
- Area code: 618
- FIPS code: 17-10084
- GNIS feature ID: 2397509

Bush is a village in Williamson County, Illinois, United States. As of the 2020 census, Bush had a population of 241.

== History ==
Bush was founded in 1902 and named for Benjamin Franklin Bush (1860–1927), a railroad and mining official who later became president of the Missouri Pacific Railroad. The village developed around a coal mine which had opened that year. A branch of the St. Louis, Iron Mountain and Southern Railway (later part of the Missouri Pacific) was extended to Bush in 1903, and a post office opened in 1904. The community incorporated as a village in 1905.

== Geography ==
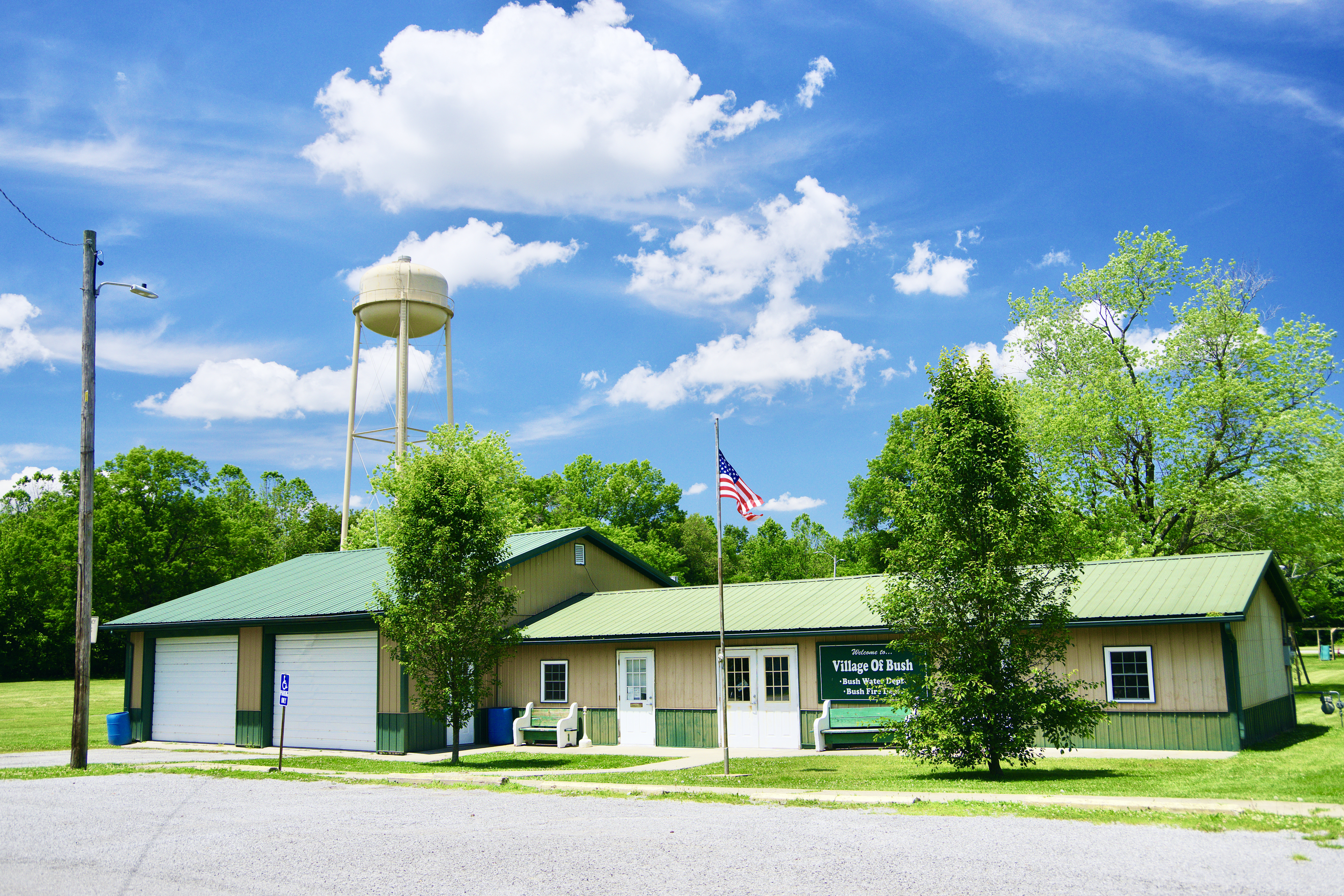
Bush Village Hall

According to the 2010 census, Bush has a total area of 0.456 square miles (1.18 km^{2}), of which 0.45 square miles (1.17 km^{2}) (or 98.68%) is land and 0.006 square miles (0.02 km^{2}) (or 1.32%) is water.

== Demographics ==
Historical population
Census	Pop.	Note	%±
1910	565		—
1920	962		70.3%
1930	589		−38.8%
1940	617		4.8%
1950	504		−18.3%
1960	459		−8.9%
1970	357		−22.2%
1980	368		3.1%
1990	351		−4.6%
2000	257		−26.8%
2010	275		7.0%
2020	241		−12.4%
U.S. Census

As of the census of 2000, there were 257 people, 110 households, and 78 families residing in the village. The population density was 558.0 inhabitants per square mile (215.4/km^{2}). There were 116 housing units at an average density of 251.9 per square mile (97.3/km^{2}). The racial makeup of the village was 98.83% White, 0.39% Asian, and 0.78% from two or more races.

There were 110 households, out of which 26.4% had children under the age of 18 living with them, 48.2% were married couples living together, 16.4% had a female householder with no husband present, and 28.2% were non-families. 27.3% of all households were made up of individuals, and 10.9% had someone living alone who was 65 years of age or older. The average household size was 2.34 and the average family size was 2.75.

In the village, the population was spread out, with 23.7% under the age of 18, 7.0% from 18 to 24, 28.0% from 25 to 44, 26.1% from 45 to 64, and 15.2% who were 65 years of age or older. The median age was 38 years. For every 100 females, there were 100.8 males. For every 100 females age 18 and over, there were 104.2 males.

The median income for a household in the village was $14,821, and the median income for a family was $28,333. Males had a median income of $30,313 versus $12,917 for females. The per capita income for the village was $11,503. About 31.1% of families and 38.1% of the population were below the poverty line, including 62.5% of those under the age of eighteen and 10.0% of those 65 or over.
