= Forest and Stream =

Defunct American outdoors magazine

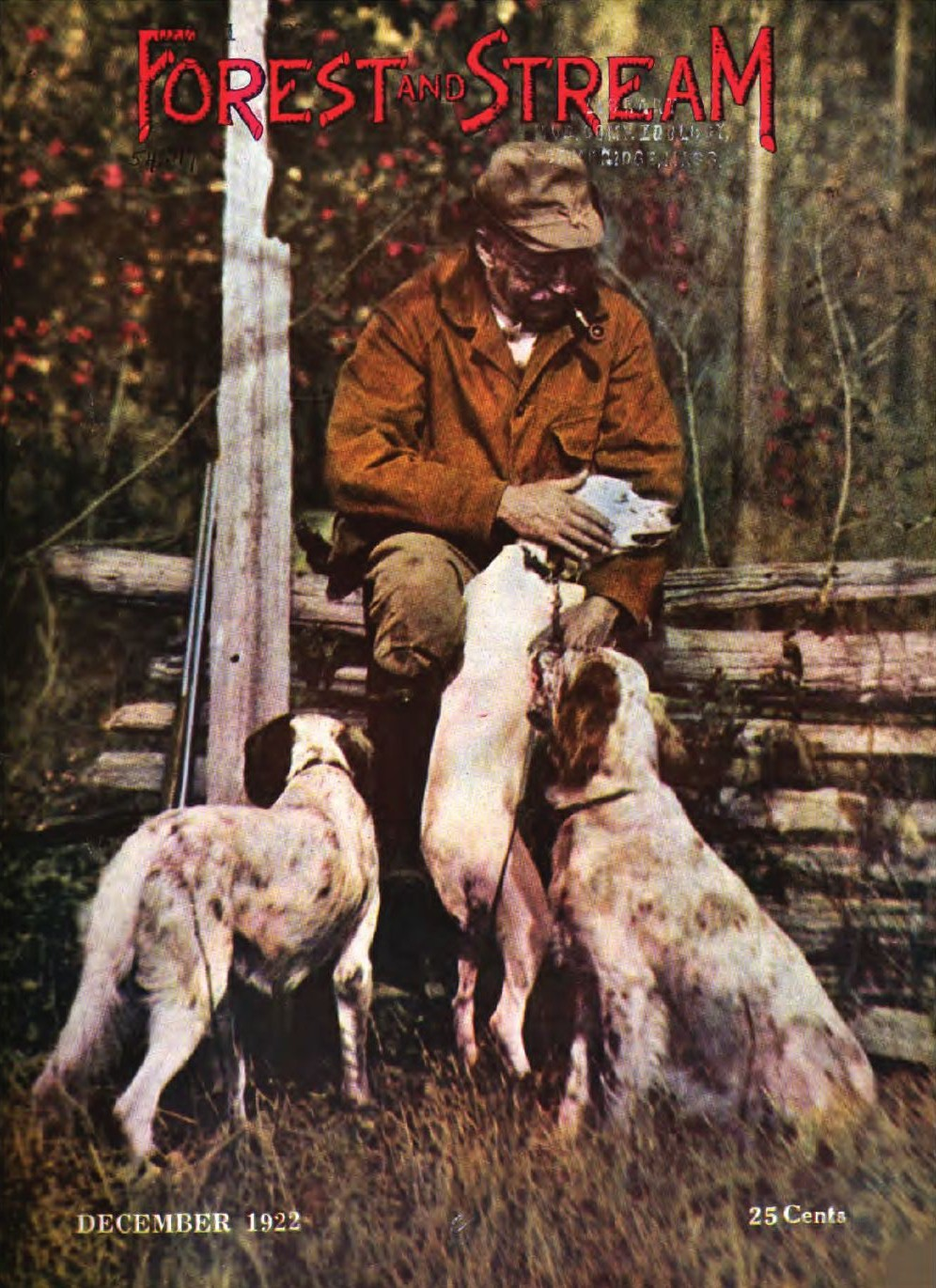
- Forest and Stream cover (December 1922)
- Editor: George Bird Grinnell
- Former editors: Charles Bingham Reynolds, Editor and Corporate Secretary
- Staff writers: George W. Sears
- Categories: Hunting, fishing, outdoor recreation
- Publisher: Charles Hallock
- First issue: August 1873
- Final issue: July 1930
- Based in: New York City

Forest and Stream was an American magazine featuring hunting, fishing, and other outdoor activities. The magazine was founded in August 1873 by Charles Hallock. When independent publication ceased, in 1930, it was the ninth oldest periodical in print in the U.S.

== Background ==
Published in New York City by Hallock in newspaper format measuring 16" x 11", Forest and Stream published many articles by "Nessmuk" (George W. Sears) in the 1880s that helped to popularize canoeing, the Adirondack lakes, self-guided canoe camping tours and ultralight camping.

An early vehicle for conservationism, Forest and Stream was dedicated to wildlife conservation, helped to launch the National Audubon Society, was an early sponsor of the national park movement, and supported the U.S.-Canadian Migratory Bird Treaty Act of 1918.

Naturalist George Bird Grinnell was editor for 35 years, and contributors included Theodore Roosevelt. Another notable contributor was Theodore Gordon, long considered "the father of American dry fly fishing," who began writing for the magazine in 1903.

The magazine merged with Field and Stream in July 1930.
