= James Ford House =

Historic house in Pennsylvania, United States

- U.S. National Register of Historic Places
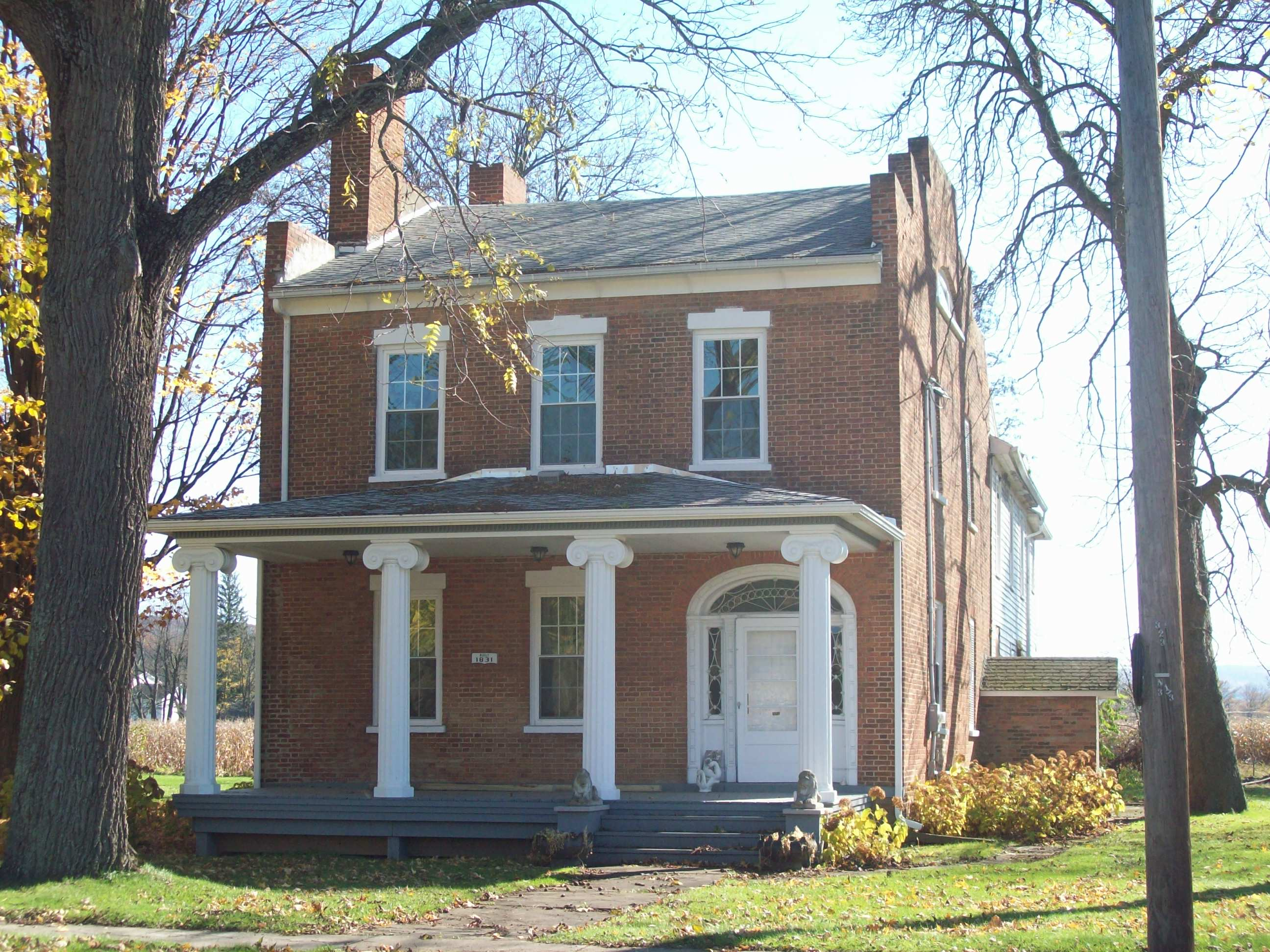
- James Ford House, October 2009

- Location within Pennsylvania Location within the United States
- Location: Cowanesque St., Lawrenceville, Pennsylvania
- Coordinates: 41°59′46″N 77°7′44″W
- Area: 2 acres (0.81 ha)
- Built: 1831
- Architectural style: Federal
- NRHP reference No.: 75001667
- Added to NRHP: December 06, 1975

James Ford House is a historic home located at Lawrenceville in Tioga County, Pennsylvania. It is a 2 1/2-story brick house built in 1831 in the late Federal style. Congressman James Ford had this house built for his son.

It was listed on the National Register of Historic Places in 1975.

== See also ==
- National Register of Historic Places listings in Tioga County, Pennsylvania
