= Samuel W. Morris =

American politician

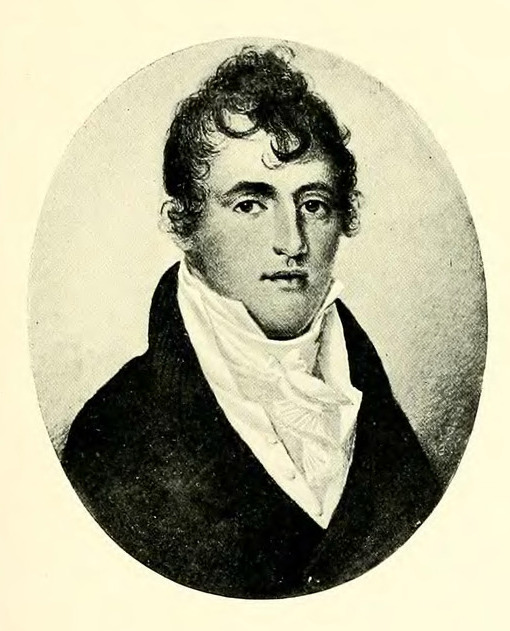
- Born: 1 September 1786; Philadelphia
- Died: 25 May 1847 (aged 60); Wellsboro
- Children: Benjamin Wistar Morris
- Parent(s): Benjamin Wistar Morris; Mary Wells Morris
- Position held: United States representative, member of the Pennsylvania House of Representatives

Samuel Wells Morris (September 1, 1786 – May 25, 1847) was a Democratic member of the U.S. House of Representatives from Pennsylvania.

Samuel W. Morris was born in Philadelphia, Pennsylvania, the son of Benjamin Wistar Morris. He pursued an academic degree at Princeton College. He studied law, was admitted to the bar and commenced practice in Wellsboro, Pennsylvania. He was a judge of the district court and served as the first treasurer of Wellsboro County. He was postmaster of Wellsboro from July 1, 1808, to April 1, 1813. He was a member of the Pennsylvania House of Representatives.

Morris was elected as a Democrat to the Twenty-fifth and Twenty-sixth Congresses, serving from September 4, 1837, till March 3, 1841. He was not a candidate for reelection in 1840 to the Twenty-seventh Congress. He died in Wellsboro in 1847.

== Sources ==
- United States Congress. "Samuel W. Morris (id: M000987)". Biographical Directory of the United States Congress.
- The Political Graveyard

U.S. House of Representatives
Preceded by John Laporte	Member of the U.S. House of Representatives from Pennsylvania's 17th congressional district 1837–1841	Succeeded by Davis Dimock, Jr.
