= Jesse Robinson House (Wellsboro, Pennsylvania) =

Historic house in Pennsylvania, United States

- U.S. National Register of Historic Places
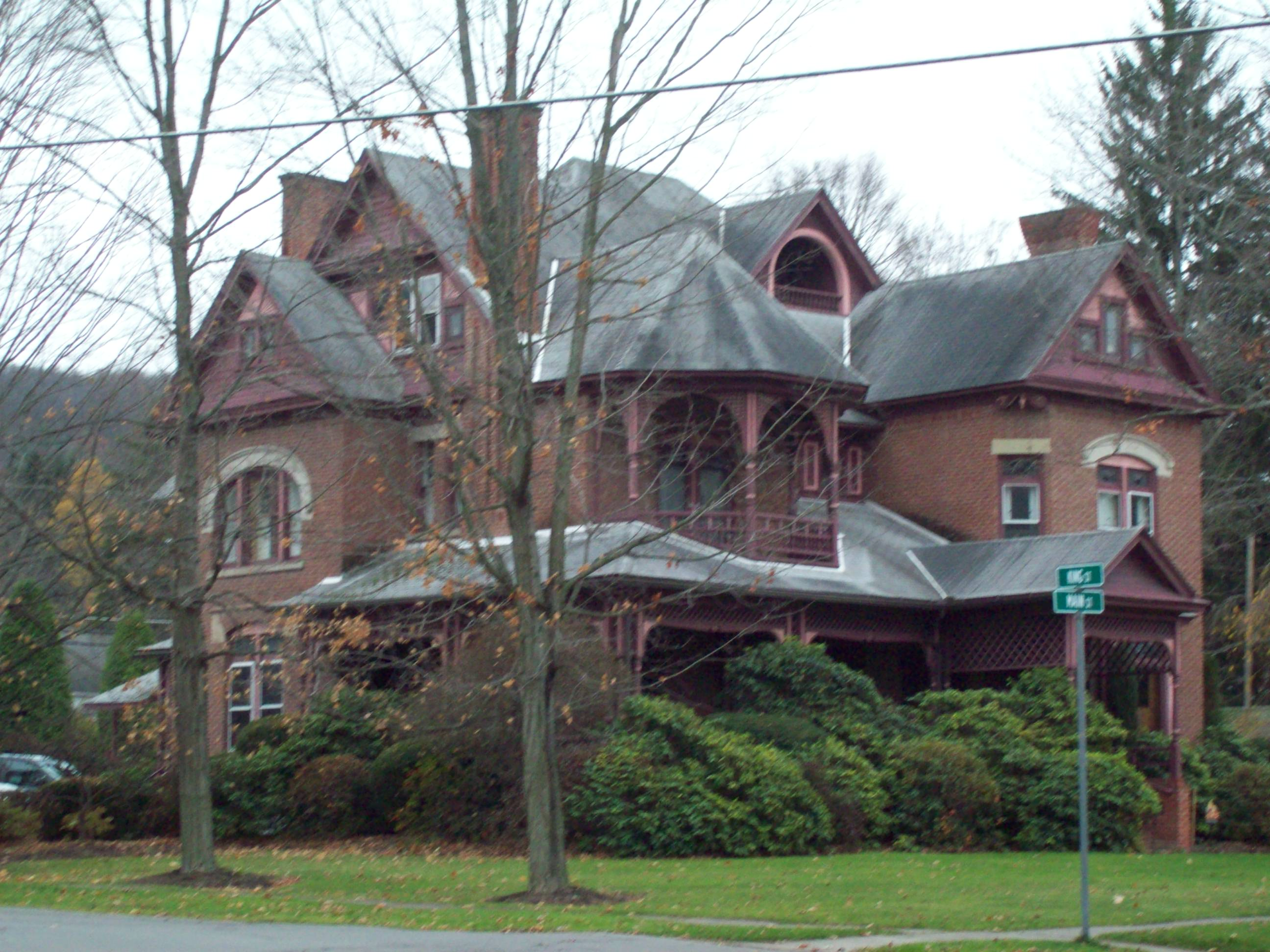
- Jesse Robinson House, Wellsboro PA, October 2009

- Location within Pennsylvania Location within the United States
- Location: 141 Main St., Wellsboro, Pennsylvania
- Coordinates: 41°44′42″N 77°18′16″W
- Area: 0.5 acres (0.20 ha)
- Built: 1888
- Architect: Pierce & Dockstader
- Architectural style: Queen Anne
- NRHP reference No.: 91000089
- Added to NRHP: February 21, 1991

The Jesse Robinson House, or the Jesse Robinson Manor, is an historic home that is located in Wellsboro in Tioga County, Pennsylvania, United States.

It was listed on the National Register of Historic Places in 1991.

== History and architectural features ==
This historic structure is a three-story Queen Anne-style house that was built in 1888. Designed by Elmira architects Pierce & Dockstader for Jesse Robinson, it features a steeply pitched roof, specially cut wood shingle siding in the dormer areas, and a wrap-around, lattice-trimmed porch. The house also features two prominent balconies and many stained glass windows. The house has been a hospital in the past and privately owned by several owners.

== See also ==
- National Register of Historic Places listings in Tioga County, Pennsylvania
