= Wellsboro Armory =

- U.S. National Register of Historic Places
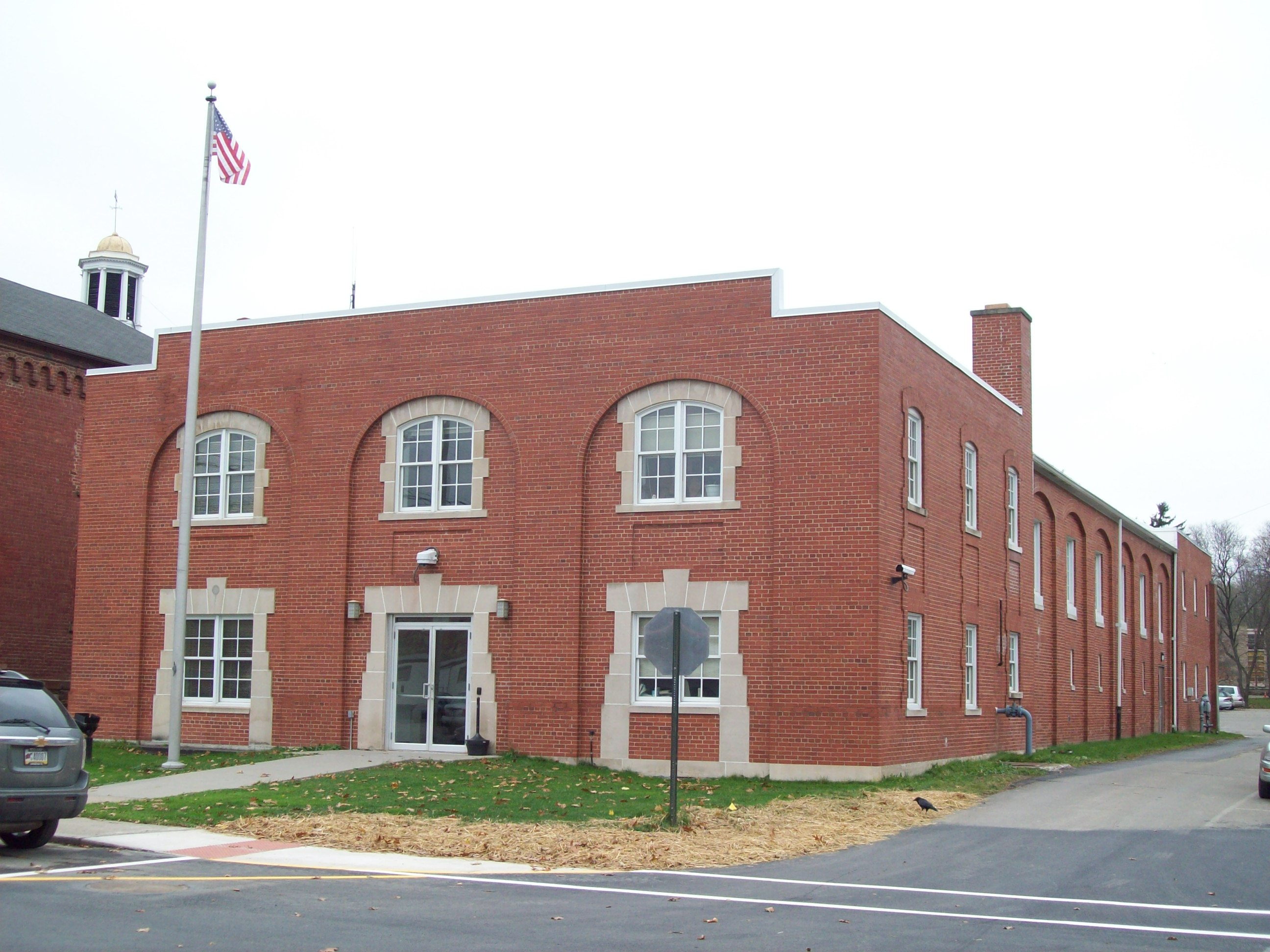
- Wellsboro Armory, October 2009

- Location within Pennsylvania Location within the United States
- Location: 2 Central Ave., Wellsboro, Pennsylvania
- Coordinates: 41°44′51″N 77°18′11″W
- Area: 0.3 acres (0.12 ha)
- Built: 1932
- Architect: Thomas H. Atherton
- Architectural style: Moderne
- MPS: Pennsylvania National Guard Armories MPS
- NRHP reference No.: 91000521
- Added to NRHP: May 9, 1991

Wellsboro Armory, is a historic National Guard armory located in Wellsboro, Pennsylvania, in Tioga County. It was built in 1932 for the Company I, 103rd Medical Regiment of the Pennsylvania National Guard. The armory consists of a brick building laid out on an "I" plan, with a two-story drill hall sandwiched between a two-story administrative section and two-story garage.

The Wellsboro Armory was formerly home to Charlie Company 3/103rd Armor before the unit moved to Mansfield, PA to join the ranks with D 3/103rd. Delta was later disbanded. Charlie Company relocated to 1810 Shumway Hill Rd in 2003. The former building still exists but is not used for that purpose anymore. It is the headquarters for Charlie Company 3/103rd AR. The armory is home to 6(six) full-time personnel including 2(two) recruiters and 4(four) maintenance personnel. It was built in 2004 for the purpose of training unit members. The armory replaced a smaller outdated armory in downtown Mansfield, PA. This information was received from SGT. VANLOON, D.

It was listed on the National Register of Historic Places in 1991.

== See also ==
- National Register of Historic Places listings in Tioga County, Pennsylvania
