= WOGA (FM) =

Radio station in Mansfield, Pennsylvania

- Mansfield, Pennsylvania; United States
- Frequency: 92.3 MHz
- Branding: WOGA in Tioga

Programming
- Format: Classic hits

Ownership
- Owner: Seven Mountains Media; (Southern Belle, LLC)
- Sister stations: WNBT-FM, WNDA

History
- First air date: 1998 (as WNBQ)
- Former call signs: WNBQ (1998–2016)
- Call sign meaning: Tioga, Pennsylvania

Technical information
- Licensing authority: FCC
- Facility ID: 78437
- Class: A
- ERP: 1,600 watts
- HAAT: 196 meters (643 ft)
- Transmitter coordinates: 41°53′53.00″N 77°5′38.00″W
- Translator: 93.5 W228DM (Mansfield)

Links
- Public license information: Public file; LMS
- Webcast: Listen live
- Website: wogaintioga.com

WOGA (92.3 FM, "WOGA in Tioga") is a radio station broadcasting a classic hits music format. Licensed to Mansfield, Pennsylvania, United States, the station is owned by Seven Mountains Media, through licensee Southern Belle, LLC, who acquired the station from the now-dismantled Allegheny Mountain Radio Network.

On June 2, 2017, WOGA changed its format from hot adult contemporary to classic hits, branded as "WOGA in Tioga".
