= Robinson House (Wellsboro, Pennsylvania) =

Historic house in Pennsylvania, United States

- U.S. National Register of Historic Places
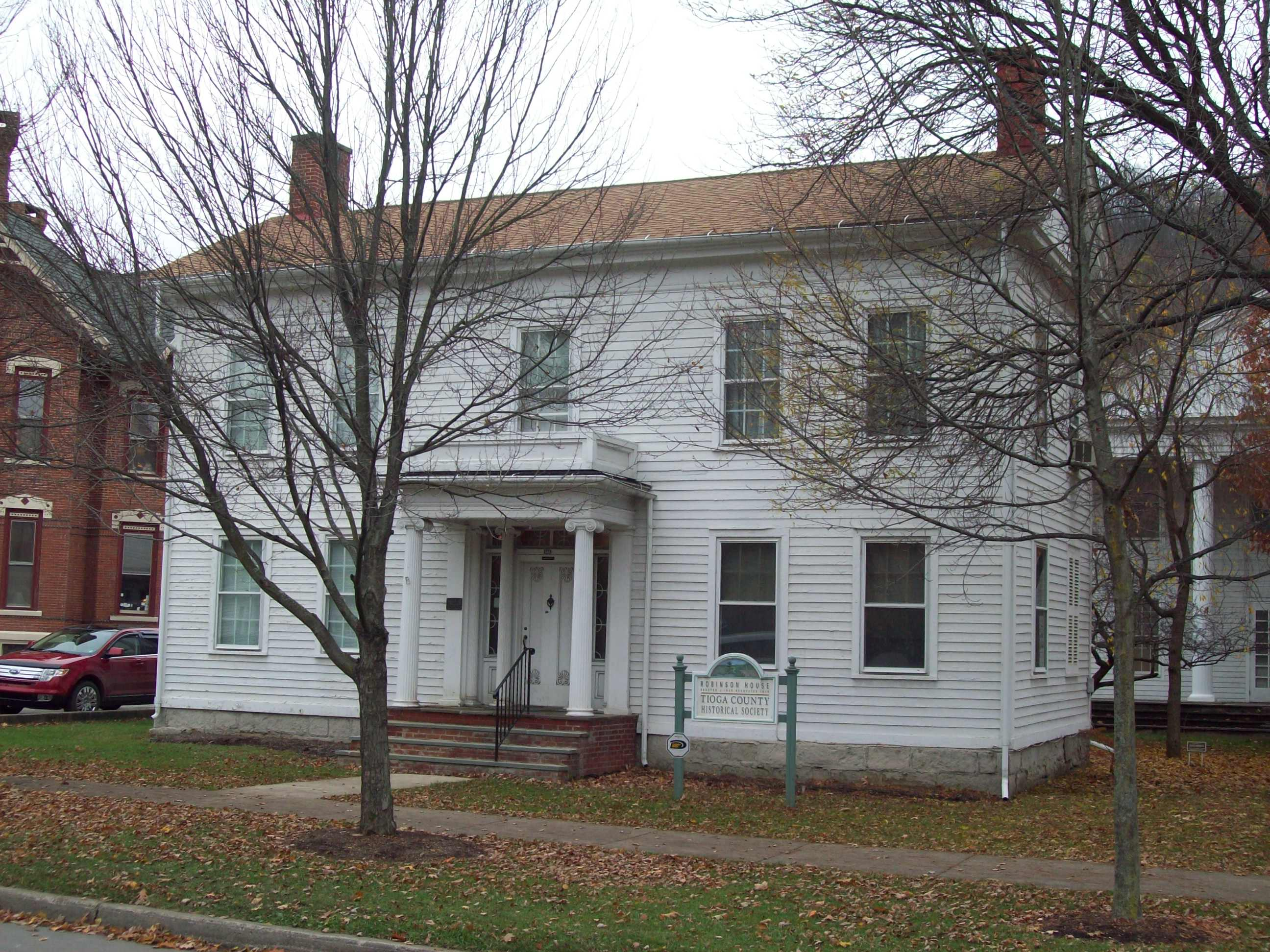
- Robinson House, Wellsboro PA, October 2009

- Location within Pennsylvania Location within the United States
- Location: 120 Main St., Wellsboro, Pennsylvania
- Coordinates: 41°44′48″N 77°18′14″W
- Area: 1 acre (0.40 ha)
- Built: 1813
- Architectural style: Greek Revival
- NRHP reference No.: 77001196
- Added to NRHP: August 3, 1977

Robinson House, also known as the White House, is a historic home located at Wellsboro in Tioga County, Pennsylvania. It is a rectangular, two story, five bay Greek Revival style house built originally in 1813 with later modifications. The 116-by-72-foot (35 by 22 m) house has a cut stone foundation and partial basement.

It was listed on the National Register of Historic Places in 1977.

== See also ==
- National Register of Historic Places listings in Tioga County, Pennsylvania
