= George W. Sears =

American environmentalist (1821–1890)

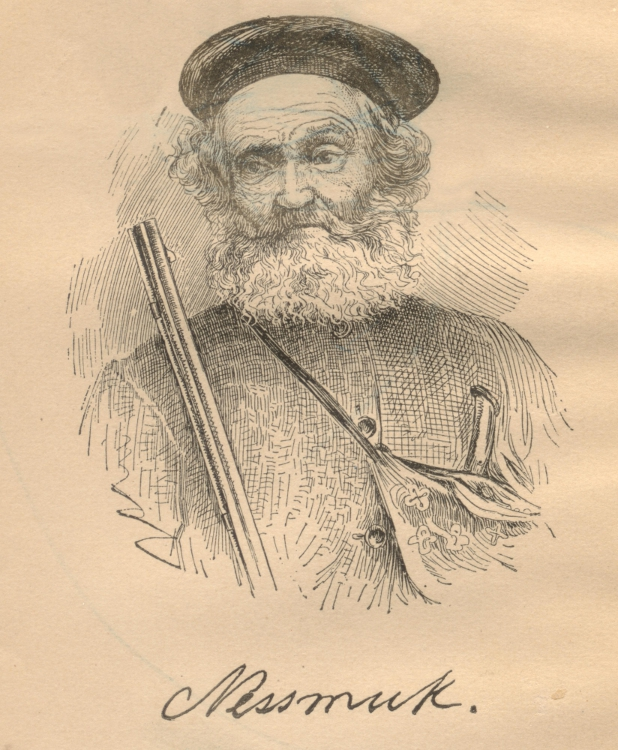

George Washington Sears (December 2, 1821 – May 1, 1890) was an American writer for Forest and Stream magazine in the 1880s and an early conservationist. His stories, appearing under the pen name "Nessmuk", popularized self-guided canoe camping tours of the Adirondack lakes in open, lightweight solo canoes and what is today called ultralight camping or ultralight backpacking.

Canoeing had been popularized by Scottish lawyer John MacGregor in the 1860s, but the typical canoe trip of the day employed expert guides and heavy canoes. Sears, who was 5 feet 3 inches (1.60 m) tall and 103 pounds (47 kg), had a 9-foot-long (2.7 m), 10 1/2-pound (4.8 kg) solo canoe built by J. Henry Rushton of Canton, New York. He named it the Sairy Gamp (the name of a Dickens character) and in it he completed a 266-mile (428 km) journey through the central Adirondacks. He was 62 years old and in frail health (tuberculosis and asthma) at the time. William Henry Harrison Murray's Adventures in the Wilderness, published in 1869, had praised the Adirondacks as having a healthy atmosphere for consumptives and Verplanck Colvin's enthusiastic writing about the Adirondack wilderness had further inspired the trip. The Sairy Gamp was acquired by the Smithsonian Institution and is now on loan to the Adirondack Museum.

Sears grew up the eldest of ten children in South Oxford (now Webster), Massachusetts. He took his pen name from a Native American who had befriended him in early childhood. He was fascinated by the few books about Native Americans his family possessed, which left him with an abiding interest in forest life and adventure. A period of factory labor while still a child left him with a fondness for the writing of Charles Dickens. At age 12 he started working in a commercial fishing fleet based on Cape Cod, and at 19 he signed on for a three-year voyage on a whaler headed for the South Pacific; it was the same year (1841) that Herman Melville shipped out of the same port bound for the same whaling grounds. On his return, his family moved to Wellsboro, Pennsylvania, where he lived for the rest of his life. But he continued traveling for adventure, from the upper Midwest and Ontario to an Amazon tributary in Brazil (in 1867 and again in 1870).

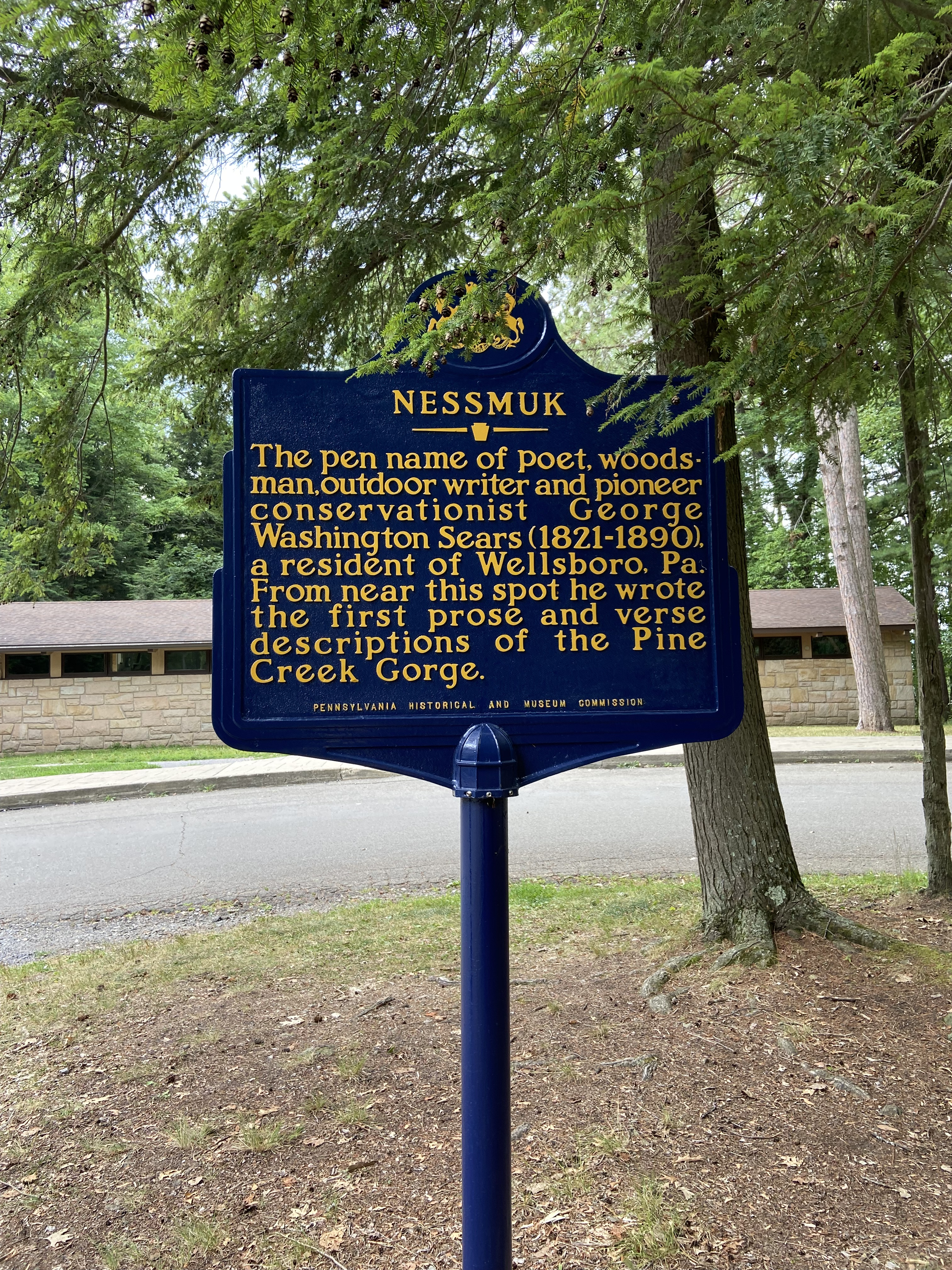
Nessmuk historical marker at Leonard Harrison State Park

Sears wrote Woodcraft, a book about camping, published in 1884, that has remained in print ever since. A book of poems, Forest Runes, appeared in 1887.

He died at his home in Pennsylvania seven years later. Mount Nessmuk, in northern Pennsylvania, is named after him. In addition, Lake Nessmuk just south of Wellsboro, PA is named after him.

== Sources ==
- Jerome, Christine (December 1998) [1994, by HarperCollins]. An Adirondack Passage: The Cruise of the Canoe Sairy Gamp. design by Alma Hochhauser Orenstein (2nd ed.). Lake George, NY: Adirondack Mountain Club. ISBN 0-935272-94-1.
