= WNDA =

Radio station in Wellsboro, Pennsylvania

Simulcasting WOGA Mansfield
- Wellsboro, Pennsylvania; United States
- Broadcast area: Elmira–Corning
- Frequency: 1490 kHz
- Branding: WOGA in Tioga

Programming
- Format: Classic hits

Ownership
- Owner: Seven Mountains Media; (Southern Belle, LLC)
- Sister stations: WNBT-FM, WOGA

History
- First air date: 1955 (as WNBT)
- Former call signs: WNBT (1955–2017)

Technical information
- Licensing authority: FCC
- Facility ID: 21199
- Class: C
- Power: 1,000 watts unlimited
- Transmitter coordinates: 41°44′41.00″N 77°17′35.00″W
- Translator: See § Translators

Links
- Public license information: Public file; LMS
- Webcast: Listen live
- Website: wogaintioga.com

WNDA (1490 AM) is a radio station broadcasting a classic hits music format, simulcasting WOGA (92.3 FM). Licensed to Wellsboro, Pennsylvania, United States, the station serves the Elmira–Corning area. The station is owned by Seven Mountains Media, through licensee Southern Belle, LLC.

== History ==
The construction permit for this station, originally known as WNBT, was granted in November 1954 to the Farm and Home Broadcasting Company. The permit initially called for WNBT to operate at a frequency of 1570 kHz and at a power of 250 watts, daytime only, from a transmitter facility upon Reservoir Hill overlooking downtown Wellsboro. However, the station did not sign on under this original channel. Farm and Home successfully applied in May 1955 for a frequency change from 1570 to 1490 kHz, and to add nighttime operation at a continuous output power of 250 watts. The station was granted this modified license in August 1955, and began operations from its studios at 89 Main Street in downtown Wellsboro. Later in the 1980s, the stations moved to 9 South Main Street in Wellsboro, which is occupied by a Tops Supermarket plaza today.

In May 1957, Cary H. Simpson, owner of the Allegheny Mountain Network based in Tyrone, acquired positive control of the station through the sale of stock by shareholder Carl Green to Farm and Home Broadcasting Company.

In 1961, WNBT was granted permission to raise its daytime power from 250 watts to 1,000 watts during the day, but was still required to reduce its power back to 250 watts during nighttime operation. With this power increase came a new transmitter, but the old one was retained for back-up purposes.

In 1978, Farm and Home Broadcasting moved WNBT's studios to the location of its FM sister station's (known then as WGCR) transmitter facility off Route 660, co-located with the Tioga County Communications Fire Tower in Delmar Township, two miles west of Wellsboro.

In July 2016, Allegheny Mountain Network agreed to sell WNBT, sister stations WNBT-FM and WNBQ, and FM translator W225AT, for $400,000. Allegheny Mountain Network president Cary Simpson died December 26, 2016. Shortly after the completion of this transaction, the station moved to its current home on U.S. Route 6 in Mansfield.

On June 2, 2017, WNDA changed from its longtime format from adult standards to a simulcast of classic hits-formatted WOGA (the former WNBQ).

== Translators ==
Broadcast translator for WNDA
Call sign	Frequency	City of license	FID	ERP (W)	HAAT	Class	FCC info
W226CG	93.1 FM	Wellsboro, Pennsylvania	141466	250	−39 m (−128 ft)	D	LMS
