= Field & Stream =

American magazine

- Cover of Vol. 129, No. 1 (2024)
- Editor-in-Chief: Colin Kearns
- President: Doug McNamee
- Legacy Stewards: Eric Church & Morgan Wallen
- Categories: Hunting, Fishing, and the Outdoors
- Frequency: Biannual
- Founded: 1895
- Company: Field & Stream
- Country: United States
- Language: English
- Website: fieldandstream.com
- ISSN: 0015-0673

Field & Stream (F&S for short) is an American magazine focusing on outdoor activities such as sport hunting and recreational fishing. It was a print publication between 1895 and 2015, and became an online-only publication in 2020.

After the magazine's purchase in 2024 by country musicians Morgan Wallen and Eric Church, the magazine later returned as print publication.

== History and profile ==
Cover of the July 1939 issue

Founded in 1895 by John P. Burkhard and Henry Wellington Wack, Field & Stream at one time had more than one million print subscribers. Depending on the season and the availability of information, the magazine may offer advices on catching bass, trout, birds, deer, as well as hunting equipments such as rifles and shotguns. The magazine also offers tricks, survival tips, random facts, and wild game recipes. In addition to those departments, each issue contains longform featured articles, for which it is renowned.

Warren H. Miller was its managing editor from 1910 to 1918. The magazine absorbed its chief competitor, Forest and Stream, in 1930. Henry Holt and Company purchased the magazine in 1951. The company published the magazine on a monthly basis in New York City. Holt eventually ended up being owned by CBS, which sold their magazines in a leveraged buyout, led by division head Peter Diamandis, to the Times-Mirror Company, which in turn sold their magazines to Time Inc. in 2001. Sid Evans was brought in to replace Slaton White, who remained on staff, as editor.

Field & Stream was one of 18 magazines sold to Bonnier Group in February 2007. That year, after a five-year tenure that had an editorial revival of the publication, Evans left to helm Garden & Gun magazine, in Charleston, South Carolina, along with then editor of Saltwater Sportsman and former F&S features editor David DiBenedetto.

Anthony Licata was then appointed editor, and under Licata, the magazine won two coveted National Magazine Awards for General Excellence, in 2009 and 2014.

The magazine's current contributors include C. J. Chivers, Jonathan Miles, Bill Heavey, T. Edward Nickens, Phil Bourjaily, Rick Bass, J.R. Sullivan, Keith McCafferty, and David E. Petzal. Notable past contributors include Robert Ruark, Ted Trueblood, Ed Zern, Nick Lyons, Tom Kelly, Thomas McGuane, Gene Hill, and Jim Harrison.

The magazine is currently edited by Colin Kearns, who was promoted from senior deputy editor in the end of 2016.

In January 2017, owing to financial difficulties at Bonnier Corporation, the magazine's publishing frequency was scaled back from nine issues a year to six, and several longtime members of the editorial staff were let go, in a "blood bath" of cuts, according to the New York Post. In October 2021, Bonnier Corp. sold Field & Stream, along with its sister title, Outdoor Life, to North Equity, a venture equity firm that alleges to scale "transformative digital media brands". The magazine's commemorative 125th-anniversary issue was its last print edition until 2024.

In January 2024, it was announced that country musicians Eric Church and Morgan Wallen purchased Field & Stream and planned to relaunch the print magazine with an apparel line and live music festival. The relaunched magazine was released in July 2024.

== Trademark ==
The Field & Stream trademarks were formerly subject to various trademark licensing agreements between CBS Magazines (and its successor-in-interests, Times-Mirror Magazines, Time Inc., and Bonnier Corporation) and Field & Stream Licenses Company (FSLC). A lawsuit filled by Times-Mirror Magazines against FSLC was rejected by the United States Court of Appeals for the Second Circuit in 2002. FSLC later assigned the trademarks to American Sports Licensing, LLC (ASL) in 2014, ASL later assigned the trademarks to current owner, F&S IP OWNER LLC in 2023.

The rights to use the Field & Stream name on retail was held by Dick's Sporting Goods for its retail store Field & Stream after the company acquired the rights in 2012. The store later rebranded to Public Lands.

The magazine later reacquired the rights to use Field & Stream name on retail from Dick's Sporting Goods in 2024, consolidated the trademark ownership. In 2025, Field & Stream began a partnership with Tractor Supply Company to sell Field & Stream branded products at Tractor Supply locations throughout the United States.

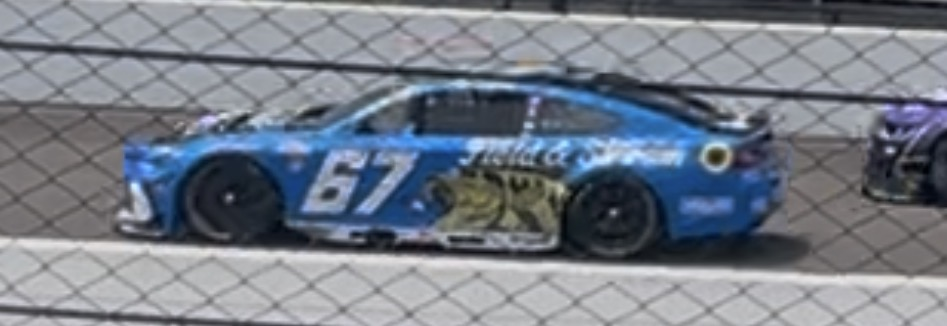
Corey Heim's race-winning Brickyard 400 car at Indianapolis Motor Speedway

In 2026, Field & Stream began a partnership with 23XI Racing to sponsor their No. 67 car for Corey Heim. Heim scored his second career win at the Indianapolis Motor Speedway with Field & Stream on the car.

== See also ==
- Corey Ford
- Outside
