= Wellsboro, Pennsylvania =

Borough in Pennsylvania, US

- Borough
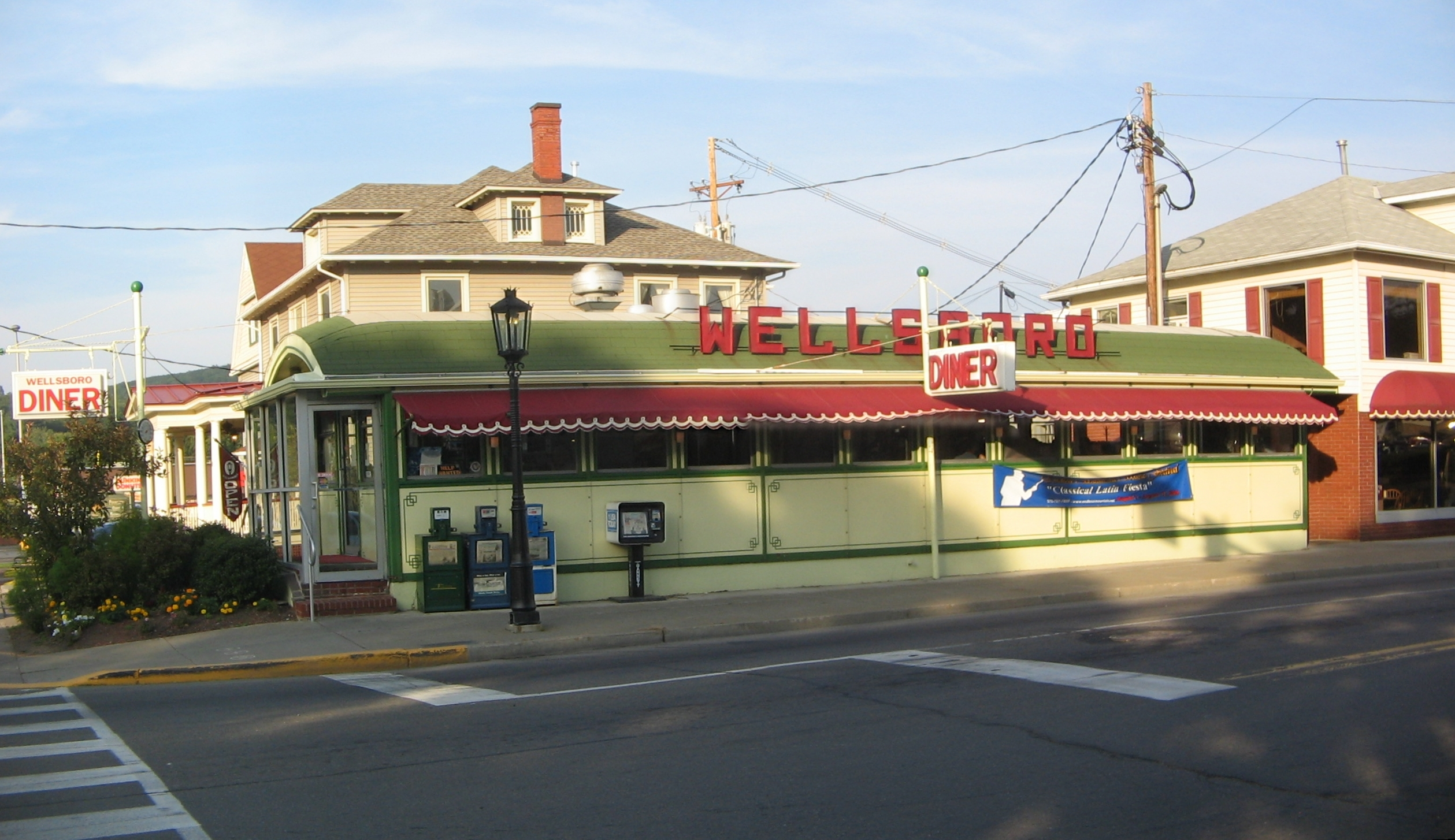
- The Wellsboro Diner

- Location of Wellsboro in Tioga County, Pennsylvania.

- Location within the U.S. state of Pennsylvania Wellsboro (the United States)
- Coordinates: 41°44′51″N 77°17′53″W
- Country: United States
- State: Pennsylvania
- County: Tioga
- Settled: 1806
- Incorporated (borough): 1830

Area
  - Total: 4.93 sq mi (12.77 km^{2})
  - Land: 4.90 sq mi (12.70 km^{2})
  - Water: 0.027 sq mi (0.07 km^{2})
- Elevation: 1,306 ft (398 m)

Population (2020)
  - Total: 3,473 ▲
  - Estimate (2021): 3,458
  - Density: 658.2/sq mi (254.15/km^{2})
- Time zone: Eastern (EST)
  - Summer (DST): EDT
- ZIP Code: 16901
- Area code: 570
- FIPS code: 42-82160
- Website: www.wellsboroborough.com

Wellsboro is a borough in and the county seat of Tioga County, Pennsylvania, United States. The borough was founded by Benjamin Wistar Morris. It is located 52 miles (84 km) northwest of Williamsport. The population was 3,472 at the 2020 census.

Early in the 20th century, Wellsboro was the shipping point and trade center for a large area. It had fruit evaporators, flour and woolen mills, a milk-condensing plant, marble works, saw mills, foundry and machine shops, and manufactories of cut glass, chemicals, rugs, bolts, cigars, carriages, and furniture. In 1900, 2,945 people lived here; in 1910, 3,183 lived here. It is also home to the Grand Canyon of Pennsylvania. It is a local tourist destination known for its iconic gas lamps that are spaced through the grass median of Main Street.

== History ==
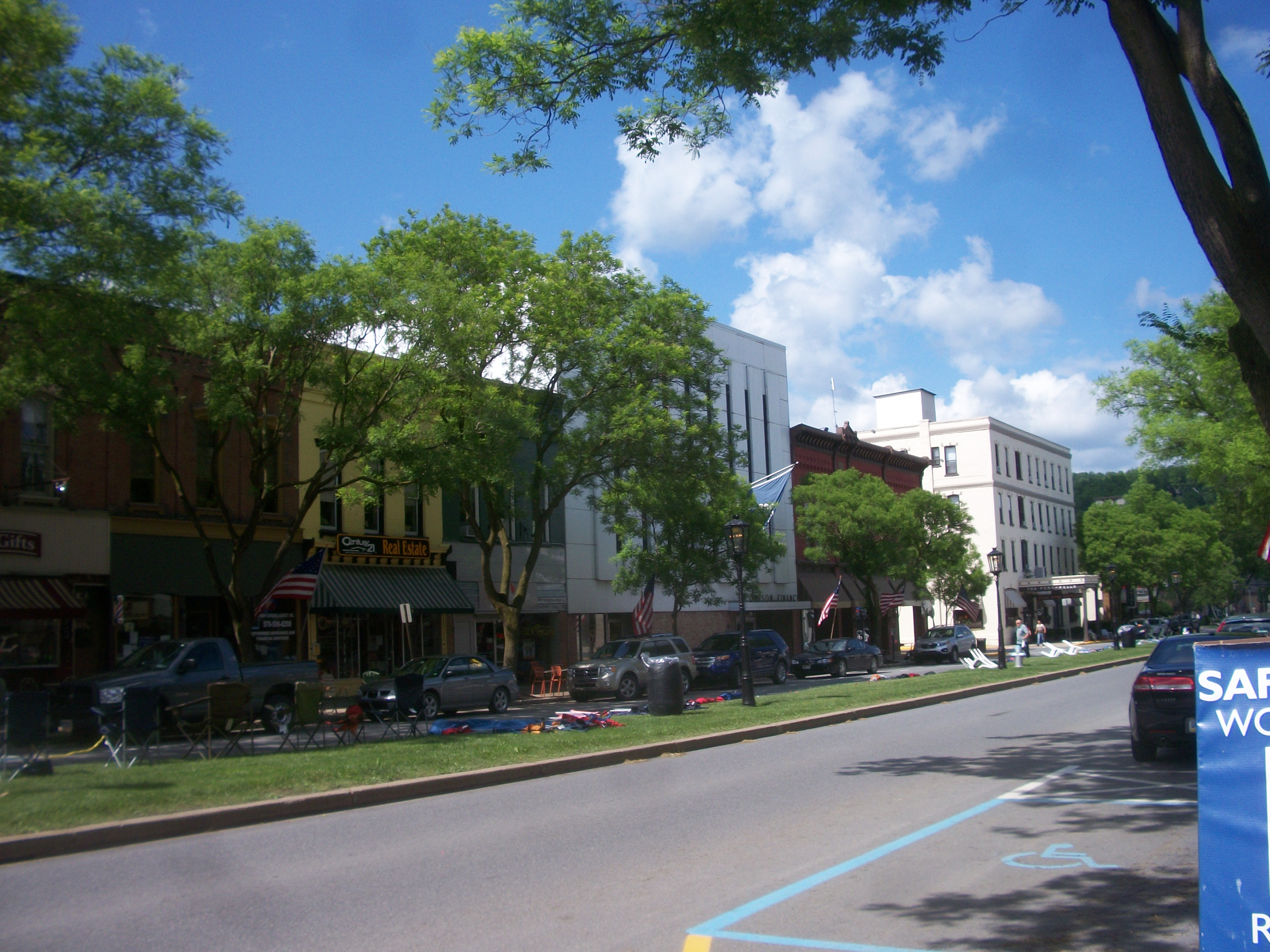
2013 view of business district in Wellsboro

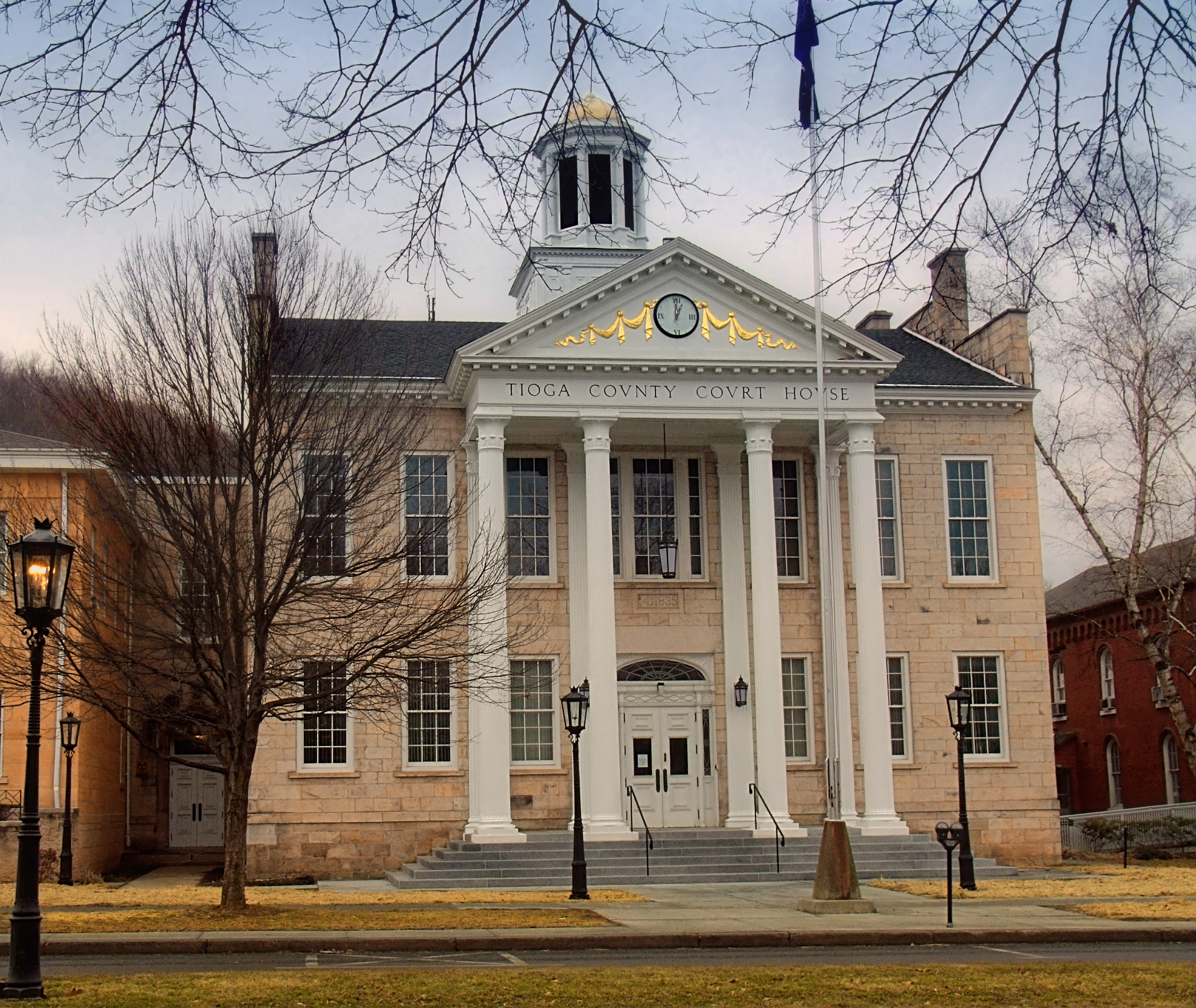
Tioga County Courthouse in Wellsboro

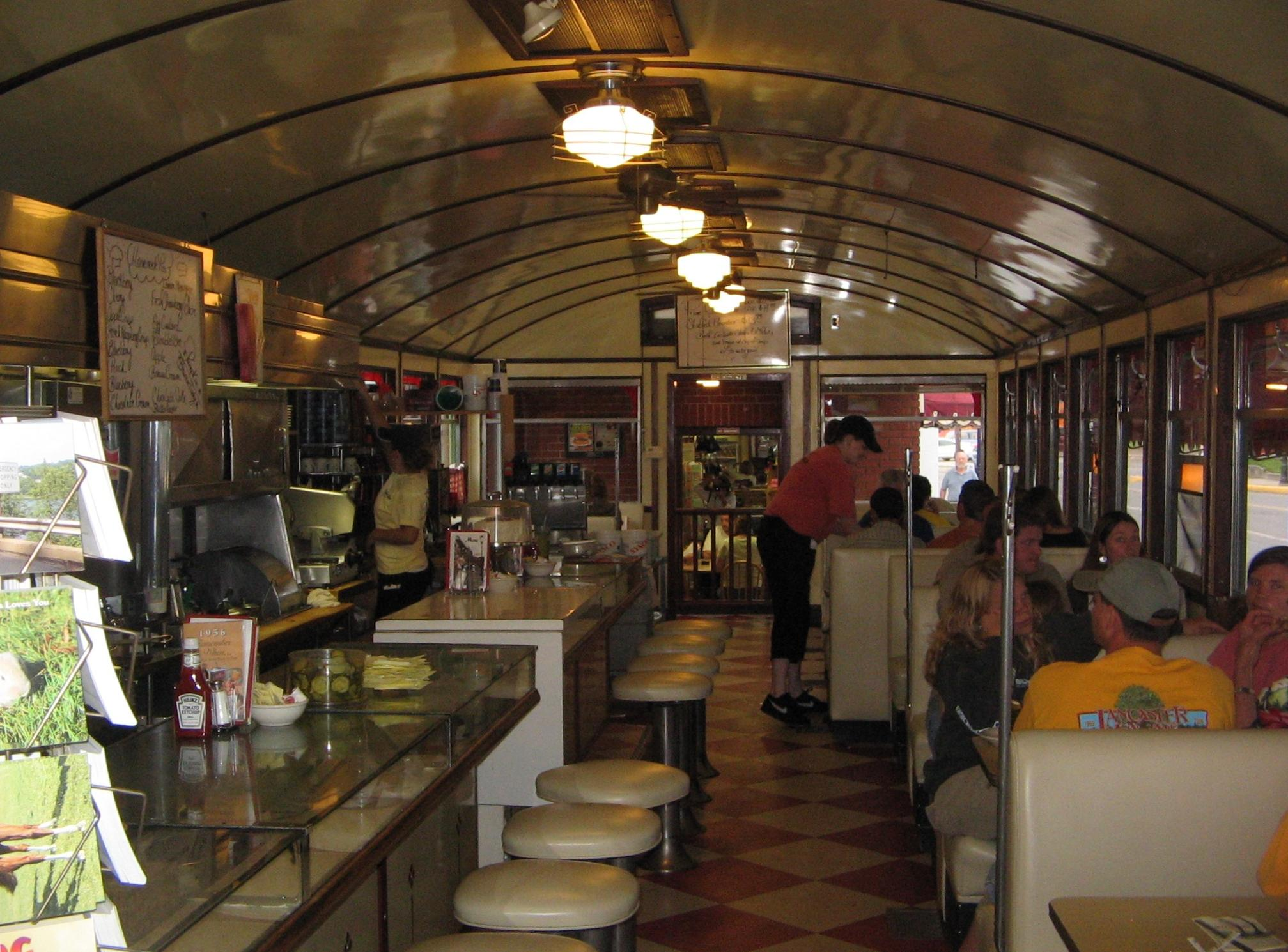
The interior of Wellsboro Diner

Wellsboro was settled in 1806 and incorporated in 1830 and was named in honor of Mary Wells, wife of one of the original settlers, Benjamin Wistar Morris. The town was the home of George W. Sears (1821–1890), a sportswriter for Field & Stream magazine in the 1880s and an early environmentalist. His stories, appearing under the pen name "Nessmuk", popularised self-guided canoe camping tours of the Adirondack lakes in open lightweight solo canoes and what is today called ultralight camping. Wellsboro was also the site of one of the first factories where light bulbs were mass-produced, using machines whose design remains essentially unchanged from the early 20th century when the Corning company established the plant in the town.

The Robinson House, Jesse Robinson House, Wellsboro Armory, and Wellsboro Historic District are listed on the National Register of Historic Places.

== Geography ==
Wellsboro is located at 41°44′48″N 77°18′7″W (41.746794, -77.301881).

According to the U.S. Census Bureau, the borough has a total area of 4.9 square miles (13 km^{2}), of which 4.9 square miles (13 km^{2}) is land and 0.04 square miles (0.10 km^{2}) (0.61%) is water.

=== Climate ===
Wellsboro has a humid continental climate (Dfa) with warm to hot summers and cold winters. Winter generally lasts from December through March, although snow has been recorded in every month except July and August. Temperatures of 100°F or more are rare, and have only been recorded in July, August, and September. The all-time record low is -30°F. Snowfall averages 60.6" per year and precipitation averages 42.27" per year.

Climate data for Wellsboro, Pennsylvania (1991–2020 normals, extremes 1926–present)
Month	Jan	Feb	Mar	Apr	May	Jun	Jul	Aug	Sep	Oct	Nov	Dec	Year
Record high °F (°C)	68 (20)	70 (21)	81 (27)	89 (32)	94 (34)	99 (37)	104 (40)	100 (38)	103 (39)	91 (33)	76 (24)	66 (19)	104 (40)
Mean daily maximum °F (°C)	30.1 (−1.1)	33.0 (0.6)	41.6 (5.3)	55.2 (12.9)	67.0 (19.4)	74.6 (23.7)	78.9 (26.1)	77.4 (25.2)	70.4 (21.3)	58.5 (14.7)	45.7 (7.6)	34.8 (1.6)	55.6 (13.1)
Daily mean °F (°C)	22.1 (−5.5)	23.8 (−4.6)	31.7 (−0.2)	43.9 (6.6)	55.2 (12.9)	63.5 (17.5)	67.8 (19.9)	66.1 (18.9)	59.0 (15.0)	47.9 (8.8)	37.2 (2.9)	27.9 (−2.3)	45.5 (7.5)
Mean daily minimum °F (°C)	14.1 (−9.9)	14.6 (−9.7)	21.8 (−5.7)	32.7 (0.4)	43.4 (6.3)	52.4 (11.3)	56.7 (13.7)	54.7 (12.6)	47.6 (8.7)	37.3 (2.9)	28.7 (−1.8)	20.9 (−6.2)	35.4 (1.9)
Record low °F (°C)	−25 (−32)	−30 (−34)	−18 (−28)	5 (−15)	19 (−7)	29 (−2)	36 (2)	31 (−1)	20 (−7)	11 (−12)	−4 (−20)	−21 (−29)	−30 (−34)
Average precipitation inches (mm)	2.99 (76)	2.48 (63)	3.25 (83)	3.56 (90)	3.65 (93)	4.29 (109)	4.14 (105)	3.67 (93)	4.17 (106)	3.64 (92)	3.17 (81)	3.26 (83)	42.27 (1,074)
Average snowfall inches (cm)	13.2 (34)	14.1 (36)	12.5 (32)	3.2 (8.1)	0.1 (0.25)	0.0 (0.0)	0.0 (0.0)	0.0 (0.0)	0.0 (0.0)	0.8 (2.0)	4.0 (10)	12.7 (32)	60.6 (154)
Average precipitation days (≥ 0.01 in)	14.8	11.9	12.6	13.4	14.5	13.1	12.3	11.9	10.9	13.7	11.6	13.6	154.3
Average snowy days (≥ 0.1 in)	10.9	9.2	5.9	1.9	0.1	0.0	0.0	0.0	0.0	0.5	3.1	8.2	39.8
Source: NOAA

== Demographics ==
Historical population
Census	Pop.	Note	%±
1850	620		—
1860	809		30.5%
1870	1,465		81.1%
1880	2,228		52.1%
1890	2,961		32.9%
1900	2,954		−0.2%
1910	3,183		7.8%
1920	3,452		8.5%
1930	3,643		5.5%
1940	3,665		0.6%
1950	4,215		15.0%
1960	4,369		3.7%
1970	4,003		−8.4%
1980	3,805		−4.9%
1990	3,430		−9.9%
2000	3,328		−3.0%
2010	3,263		−2.0%
2020	3,469		6.3%
2021 (est.)	3,458	▼	−0.3%

=== 2020 census ===
As of the 2020 census, Wellsboro had a population of 3,469. The median age was 45.6 years. 19.9% of residents were under the age of 18 and 27.4% of residents were 65 years of age or older. For every 100 females there were 81.2 males, and for every 100 females age 18 and over there were 80.6 males age 18 and over.

0.0% of residents lived in urban areas, while 100.0% lived in rural areas.

There were 1,567 households in Wellsboro, of which 25.1% had children under the age of 18 living in them. Of all households, 40.5% were married-couple households, 18.6% were households with a male householder and no spouse or partner present, and 33.5% were households with a female householder and no spouse or partner present. About 37.9% of all households were made up of individuals and 20.0% had someone living alone who was 65 years of age or older.

There were 1,773 housing units, of which 11.6% were vacant. The homeowner vacancy rate was 2.9% and the rental vacancy rate was 8.6%.

Racial composition as of the 2020 census
Race	Number	Percent
White	3,222	92.9%
Black or African American	22	0.6%
American Indian and Alaska Native	6	0.2%
Asian	62	1.8%
Native Hawaiian and Other Pacific Islander	1	0.0%
Some other race	15	0.4%
Two or more races	141	4.1%
Hispanic or Latino (of any race)	55	1.6%

=== 2000 census ===
As of the census of 2000, there were 3,328 people, 1,469 households, and 866 families residing in the borough. The population density was 681.0 inhabitants per square mile (262.9/km^{2}). There were 1,602 housing units at an average density of 327.8 per square mile (126.6/km^{2}). The racial makeup of the borough was 98.14% White, 0.39% African American, 0.18% Native American, 0.90% Asian, 0.18% from other races, and 0.21% from two or more races. Hispanic or Latino of any race were 0.57% of the population.

There were 1,469 households, out of which 25.0% had children under the age of 18 living with them, 47.0% were married couples living together, 9.7% had a female householder with no husband present, and 41.0% were non-families. 36.1% of all households were made up of individuals, and 18.2% had someone living alone who was 65 years of age or older. The average household size was 2.17 and the average family size was 2.83.

In the borough the population was spread out, with 20.9% under the age of 18, 7.7% from 18 to 24, 23.1% from 25 to 44, 24.2% from 45 to 64, and 24.1% who were 65 years of age or older. The median age was 44 years. For every 100 females there were 80.9 males. For every 100 females age 18 and over, there were 75.3 males.

The median income for a household in the borough was $30,169, and the median income for a family was $39,898. Males had a median income of $37,083 versus $20,492 for females. The per capita income for the borough was $18,096. About 9.5% of families and 14.8% of the population were below the poverty line, including 19.8% of those under age 18 and 13.9% of those age 65 or over.

== Media ==
WNDA 1490AM (1000 watts) and WNBT-FM (50,000 watts) are owned by Southern Belle LLC. The Wellsboro Gazette is a weekly print publication owned by Tioga Publishing Company which covers news in Wellsboro and surrounding towns. Mountain Home, published by Beagle Media, is a monthly regional magazine headquartered and published out of Wellsboro.

Wellsboro receives television programming from the Elmira-Corning media market.

Additionally, Wellsboro is the first market opened by online media/news company The Home Page Network (starting as Wellsboro Home Page).

== Education ==
It is in the Wellsboro Area School District.

== Events ==
- Pennsylvania State Laurel Festival (June): A week-long celebration featuring a juried arts and crafts fair, queen's pageant, parades, and live music.
- Maple Weekend (March): Offers tours of local sugarhouses and tastings of maple products, highlighting regional maple syrup production.
- Performances at the Deane Center for the Performing Arts (Year-round): Hosts concerts, magic shows, and theatrical productions contributing to the town's arts and culture scene.
- Dickens of a Christmas (December): An annual event where downtown Wellsboro transforms into a Victorian-era marketplace, featuring costumed vendors, carolers, and holiday-themed activities.
- Christmas on Main Street (December): A festive celebration with decorated storefronts, horse-drawn carriage rides, and visits with Santa, enhancing the holiday spirit in the community.
- Wellsboro Comic Con (August): A convention celebrating pop culture, comics, and cosplay, attracting enthusiasts and artists to downtown Wellsboro.
- Tioga County Fair (August): A traditional county fair featuring agricultural exhibits, livestock shows, carnival rides, and local entertainment.
- Endless Mountain Music Festival (July–August): A multi-week classical music festival that brings renowned musicians to perform in various venues throughout the region.

== Notable people ==
- Morton Shelley Bailey, member of the Colorado Senate and Colorado Supreme Court
- Benjamin Franklin Bush, railroad executive
- Michael Capuzzo, journalist and non-fiction author
- Kathryn Crawford, film and theatre actress active in the 1920s and 1930s
- William O. Goodman, lumber tycoon
- Leonard Harrison, businessman in the lumber industry
- James Lowrey, lawyer and member of the Pennsylvania House of Representatives
- Louise Leonard McLaren, school founder
- Benjamin Wistar Morris, second bishop of the Episcopal Diocese of Oregon
- Benjamin Wistar Morris, colonist
- Horace Billings Packer, congressman
- John Preston, dog handler and Pennsylvania State Police officer
- Ed Schieffelin, Indian scout and prospector
- George W. Sears, sportswriter and conservationist
- Warren Spencer, member of the Pennsylvania House of Representatives
- William A. Stone, 22nd governor of Pennsylvania
- Polonia brothers, filmmakers
- Taylor Acorn, pop punk singer/songwriter
