= WNBT-FM =

Radio station in Wellsboro, Pennsylvania

WNBT-FM and WZBF

WNBT-FM: Wellsboro, Pennsylvania; WZBF: Wellsboro–Ridgebury Township, Pennsylvania; United States
- Broadcast area: New York's Southern Tier; Pennsylvania's Northern Tier; Elmira-Corning, New York
- Frequencies: WNBT-FM: 104.5 MHz; WZBF: 96.9 MHz
- Branding: Bigfoot Country 96 - 104 - 107

Programming
- Format: Country
- Affiliations: Compass Media Networks

Ownership
- Owner: Seven Mountains Media; (Southern Belle, LLC)
- Sister stations: WNDA, WOGA

History
- First air date: WNBT-FM: July 2, 1969 (as WGCR); WZBF: 1991 (as WMKB)
- Former call signs: WNBT-FM: WGCR (1969–1983); WZBF: WMKB (1988–1998); WREQ (1998–2009); WZKN (2009–2016); WVYS (2016–2018)

Technical information
- Licensing authority: FCC
- Facility ID: WNBT-FM: 21200; WZBF: 40383
- Class: WNBT-FM: B; WZBF: A
- ERP: WNBT-FM: 50,000 watts; WZBF: 3,200 watts
- HAAT: WNBT-FM: 116 meters (381 ft); WZBF: 139.7 m (458 ft)
- Transmitter coordinates: WNBT-FM: 41°44′17.00″N 77°21′50.00″W; WZBF: 41°53′55.0″N 76°43′8.0″W
- Translator(s): 107.3 W297BG (Ulster)
- Repeater(s): 96.9 WZBF-FM2 (Towanda)

Links
- Public license information: WNBT-FM: Public file; LMS; WZBF: Public file; LMS
- Webcast: Listen live
- Website: bigfootcountry1045.com

WNBT-FM (104.5 MHz) and WZBF (96.9 MHz), "Bigfoot Country 96 - 104 - 107") are two radio stations broadcasting a country music radio format. WNBT-FM is licensed to Wellsboro, Pennsylvania, and WZBF is licensed to Ridgebury Township, Pennsylvania. The stations are part of a quadcast serving Pennsylvania's Northern Tier and New York's Southern Tier, including the Elmira - Corning radio market. They are owned by Seven Mountains Media, through licensee Southern Belle, LLC.

== History ==
WNBT-FM began as the FM sister station of Farm & Home Broadcasting Company-owned WNBT (now WNDA) with the call letters WGCR-FM. The station was initially granted a construction permit to operate at the frequency of 97.7 MHz at an effective radiated power of a thousand watts in August 1968. In 1973, the FCC granted permission for WGCR-FM to drop the 'FM' from its call letters, change its city of license from Wellsboro to "Wellsboro-Mansfield", and change its dial position from 97.7 to 104.5 MHz, with a power increase to 50,000 watts.

In May 2017, WNBT-FM changed its format from hot adult contemporary (branded as "The Buzz") to country, branded as "Bigfoot Country 104.5".

On July 9, 2018, WNBT-FM began simulcasting on WZBF (96.9 FM) in Ridgebury; that station was previously adult contemporary-formatted WVYS "Yes FM".

== Translator and booster ==
| Call sign | Frequency | City of license | FID | ERP (W) | HAAT | Class | FCC info | Notes |
|---|---|---|---|---|---|---|---|---|
| W297BG | 107.3 FM | Ulster, Pennsylvania | 140305 | 235 | 134 m (440 ft) | D | LMS | WZBF translator |
| WZBF-FM2 | 96.9 FM | Towanda, Pennsylvania | 185614 | 1,200 | 88 m (289 ft) | D | LMS | WZBF booster |
