= Kathleen Hamm =

American lawyer

Kathleen M. Hamm

Board Member of the Public Company Accounting Oversight Board
- In office January 2018 – November 2019

Counselor to U.S. Treasury Deputy Secretary
- In office 2014–2017

Assistant Director of Enforcement at the Securities and Exchange Commission
- In office 1997–2000

Personal details
- Born: February 2, 1963 (age 63) Albany, New York, U.S.
- Education: University at Buffalo, SUNY (BS); Duke University School of Law (JD); Georgetown University Law Center (LLM)

Kathleen M. Hamm (born February 2, 1963) is an American lawyer, federal regulator and fintech and cybersecurity expert, formerly a board member of the Public Company Accounting Oversight Board, and Counselor to the Deputy Secretary of the U.S. Department of Treasury for cyber policy and financial regulation. In April 2021, her alma mater, University at Buffalo School of Management, named her Accountant of the Year.

Hamm was the global leader of securities and fintech services and senior strategic adviser on cyber solutions to the chief executive officer of Promontory Financial Group, a wholly owned subsidiary of IBM. She specializes in developing processes to embed regulatory requirements and cybersecurity into business operations and controls, changing how business systems are developed and improving their consumer protection. She also is a commentator on the opportunities and risks that emerging technology, such as artificial intelligence, presents to cybersecurity and ways that government and regulators may respond.

After leaving public service, Hamm established Pearl Advisory Group, LLC. She has served on the boards of several companies, including the Long-Term Stock Exchange, Inc., an exchange focusing on long-term value creation. She also is trustee and chair of the audit committee of the University of Buffalo Foundation, Inc., and chair of the Dean's Advisory Council for the University at Buffalo School of Management, SUNY.

== Early life and education ==
Hamm was born on February 2, 1963, in Albany, NY. She graduated from the University at Buffalo, SUNY, in 1985 with a B.S., summa cum laude, with distinction, majoring in business administration, concentrating in accounting; from Duke University School of Law in 1988 with a J.D., with honors; and from Georgetown University Law Center in 1994 first in her class, with an LL.M. in securities regulation, with distinction.

== Career ==
Hamm was appointed to the board of the PCAOB in January 2018 by the commissioners of the Securities and Exchange Commission, after consultation with the chair of the board of governors of the Federal Reserve System and the secretary of the Treasury. She earned a reputation for using the bully pulpit to increase auditors’ focus on cybersecurity, especially when conducting their risk assessments. She has continued to focus attention on cybersecurity at audit firms; and she has called for the combination of emerging technology and large-scale use of data to better arm investors and other financial statement users with consistent, comparable and decision-useful information on audit quality.

Hamm left the Board in November 2019 after completing her term. She joined the PCAOB from Promontory Financial Group, where she was the Global Leader of Securities and Fintech Services and Senior Strategic Adviser on Cyber Solutions to the chief executive officer, Eugene Ludwig, from February 2017 to January 2018. This was her second time working at Promontory, where she started out as a managing director, building the securities practice (October 2004 to September 2014). She was an early advocate for exchanges, hedge funds and global companies to improve their regulatory compliance and cybersecurity by embedding their legal requirements into their operations and control environments. In between the two positions at Promontory, Hamm served as Counselor to the Deputy Secretary of the U.S. Department of Treasury for cyber policy and financial regulation (September 2014 to January 2017). At Treasury, she also represented the United States on a cybersecurity expert group impaneled by the G7 finance ministers and central bank governors.

From 2001 to early 2004, Hamm served as the Senior Vice President in Charge of Regulation and Compliance for the Nasdaq-Liffe Markets(NQLX), which closed in December 2004. She worked briefly (2000 to 2001) at Wilson Sonsini Goodrich & Rosati, P.C., as a securities attorney; and at Streich, Lang, Weeks & Cardon, P.A. (1988 to 1990), as a corporate and securities associate.

She started her career at the SEC in the Division of Enforcement (1991 to 2000) as a Staff Attorney and Senior Counsel (1991 to 1995), then a Branch Chief (1995 to 1997), and an assistant director (1997 to 2000).

== Professional memberships and activities ==
Hamm is a Member of the Bar in the District of Columbia, California, and Arizona. She was a long-time member of the Duke Law School board of visitors. Hamm serves as a trustee and chair of the audit committee at the University of Buffalo Foundation, Inc. She also serves as Chair of the Dean’s Advisory Council for the University at Buffalo School of Management, SUNY. Prior to joining the PCAOB, Hamm was an adjunct professor at Georgetown University Law Center, teaching corporate controls, compliance, and governance. Hamm also was a director, member of the executive committee, and chair of the regulatory oversight committee of the National Stock Exchange, which is now part of the New York Stock Exchange, from early 2012 until its sale in the fall of 2014.
