= Christy Ferer =

American businesswoman

Christine Ann Ferer (born sometime in 1950 or 1951) is an American former TV reporter and style commentator and the founder of Vidicom and Citybuzz. She spent most of her career in New York City and was married to Neil David Levin, the executive director of the Port Authority of New York and New Jersey. Since his death in the September 11 attacks, she has held a number of positions in public service, including on the board of the National September 11 Memorial & Museum.

== Early life and education ==
Ferer was born in St. Louis. Her father, Richard Ferer, lost a leg while serving in World War II and died when she was 12; After graduating from Ladue Horton Watkins High School, she earned a bachelor's degree from the University of Colorado Boulder and a master's degree in urban affairs from Boston University.

== Career ==
Ferer began her career as a TV reporter in 1973 in St. Louis, where she had returned to assist her mother in her final illness. In 1979, while working as a breaking news reporter at WPIX in New York City, she persuaded her editor to let her cover a fashion show; in 1981–82 she founded Vidicom, which provided videos of fashion shows to local news, paid for by the fashion houses. The company moved into fashion videos emulating music videos and became a producer of branded video including digital InteractTV, with clients including the Metropolitan Museum of Art and Hebrew National hot dogs. Also in the early 1980s, she became a style correspondent for the Today show, where she was referred to as "the bargain basement Martha Stewart". She continued to appear on it and other morning TV shows for 25 years. She wrote two books on home decorating and in 2000 launched an online furniture and decorating portal, stylewiz.com.

In addition to Vidicom, Ferer founded Citybuzz, which developed out of a video guide to New York that she had created for houseguests. She suggested to Preston Robert Tisch, an acquaintance, that Loews Corporation hotels in the city make it available to guests, and by 1982 Citybuzz had become the first in-hotel TV network, branded as Applevision. It expanded to other cities including Chicago, to taxis, and to in-flight video. In 2014 the company won the contract to provide all ads on MTA subway WiFi. Her work with New York tourism led to her appointment to the board of the Javits Convention Center, where she served on the sales and marketing committee.

== Personal life and after 9/11 ==
Ferer has two daughters from her first marriage, to Bob Millard, a partner at Lehman Brothers, which ended in divorce. In 1996 she remarried to Neil David Levin. In early 2001 he became the executive director of the Port Authority of New York and New Jersey, and he was killed in the collapse of the World Trade Center on September 11. His body was recovered 7 months later, in April 2002. He is buried at Mount Lebanon Cemetery in Glendale, Queens, New York,

In February 2002, Mayor Michael Bloomberg appointed her as his liaison to the families of those who died in the attacks. She participated in the discussions that led to The Sphere being installed in Battery Park as an interim memorial, was on the board of the Lower Manhattan Development Corporation until 2004, became a founding board member of the National September 11 Memorial & Museum, and in 2011 was appointed to the board of a projected performing arts center there. In 2004, Governor George Pataki appointed her to the board of the Port Authority, for a term expiring in 2007.

She also serves on the board of the 92nd Street Y and, outside New York, the Aspen Art Museum. Ferer served on the Board of Trustees at the East Hamptons Historical Society from 2017 to at least 2018.

== Honors ==
- New York Emmy for spot news, WPIX reporters, coverage of New York City blackout of 1977, 1977
- New York Women in Communications, Matrix Award, special award for Service Communications, 2003
- Legion of Honour, 2010

== Publications ==
- Decorating on a Dime: Trade Secrets from a Style Maker. New York: Warner, 1997. ISBN 978-0446911726.
- with Risa Palazzo. Breaking the Rules: Home Style for the Way We Live Today. New York: Simon and Schuster, 2001. ISBN 978-0684866093.
