= Diana Taylor =

Diana Taylor may refer to:

- Diana Taylor (professor) (born 1950), professor at New York University's Tisch School of the Arts
- Diana Taylor (superintendent) (born 1955), New York State Superintendent of Banks
- Diana Taylor (General Hospital), a fictional character on the U.S. soap opera, General Hospital
