= 55th Street (Manhattan) =

West-east street in Manhattan, New York

Coordinates: 40.7635°N 73.9793°W

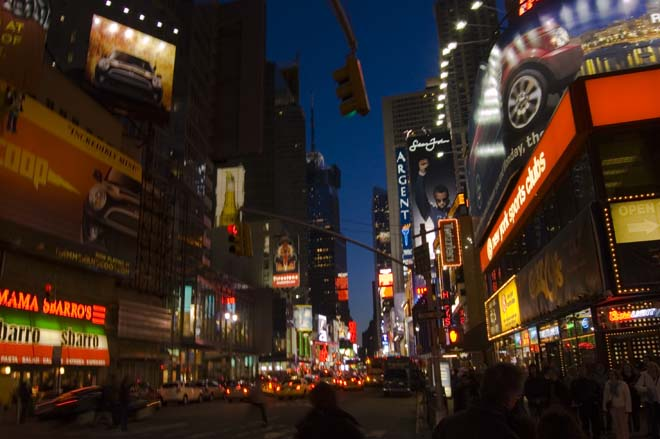
- Interactive map of 55th Street
- Maintained by: Government of New York City
- Length: 2.0 mi (3.2 km)
- Location: New York
- East end: Cul-de-sac east of Sutton Place South
- West end: NY 9A (West Side Highway)

55th Street is a two-mile-long, one-way street traveling east to west across Midtown Manhattan.

== Landmarks, east to west ==
=== Sutton Place South ===
- The route officially begins at Sutton Place South which is on a hill overlooking FDR Drive.
- Plaza 400 Apartments, 40-story, 119 m/392 ft apartment building completed in 1967 (north)

=== First Avenue ===
- Terrence Cardinal Cook Building (south)
- Church of St. John the Evangelist (south)
- Bristol Apartments, 33-story apartment building completed in 1973

=== Second Avenue ===
- Brevard Apartments, 30-story apartments completed in 1981
- Marymount Manhattan College Dormitory, 48-story, 144 m / 473 ft mixed apartment house and dormitory completed in 2001 (north)

=== Third Avenue ===
- 919 Third Avenue, 47-story 188 m / 615 ft building completed in 1971 (north)
- P. J. Clarke's, antique tavern known for holding its own and remaining intact despite attempts to destroy it for 919 Third. (north)

=== Lexington Avenue ===
- Central Synagogue
- 124 East 55th Street
- 116 East 55th Street – now Levin Institute
- DLT Entertainment headquarters
- Hong Kong Economic and Trade Office

=== Park Avenue ===
- Park Avenue Place, 38-story, 472 ft (144 m) office tower completed in 2004 (south)
- Park Avenue Tower, 36-story, 561 ft (171 m) office tower completed in 1987 with a distinctive pyramid roof (north)
- Heron Tower, 314 ft (96 m), 25-story building completed in 1986
- Martin Erdmann House – now New York Friars Club

=== Madison Avenue ===
- 550 Madison Avenue, 37-story, 647 ft (197 m) building completed in 1984 originally to be the headquarters of AT&T and later Sony USA (north)
- Finland House, 38-story, 427 ft (130 m) office tower completed in 1970 (north)
- The St. Regis Hotel

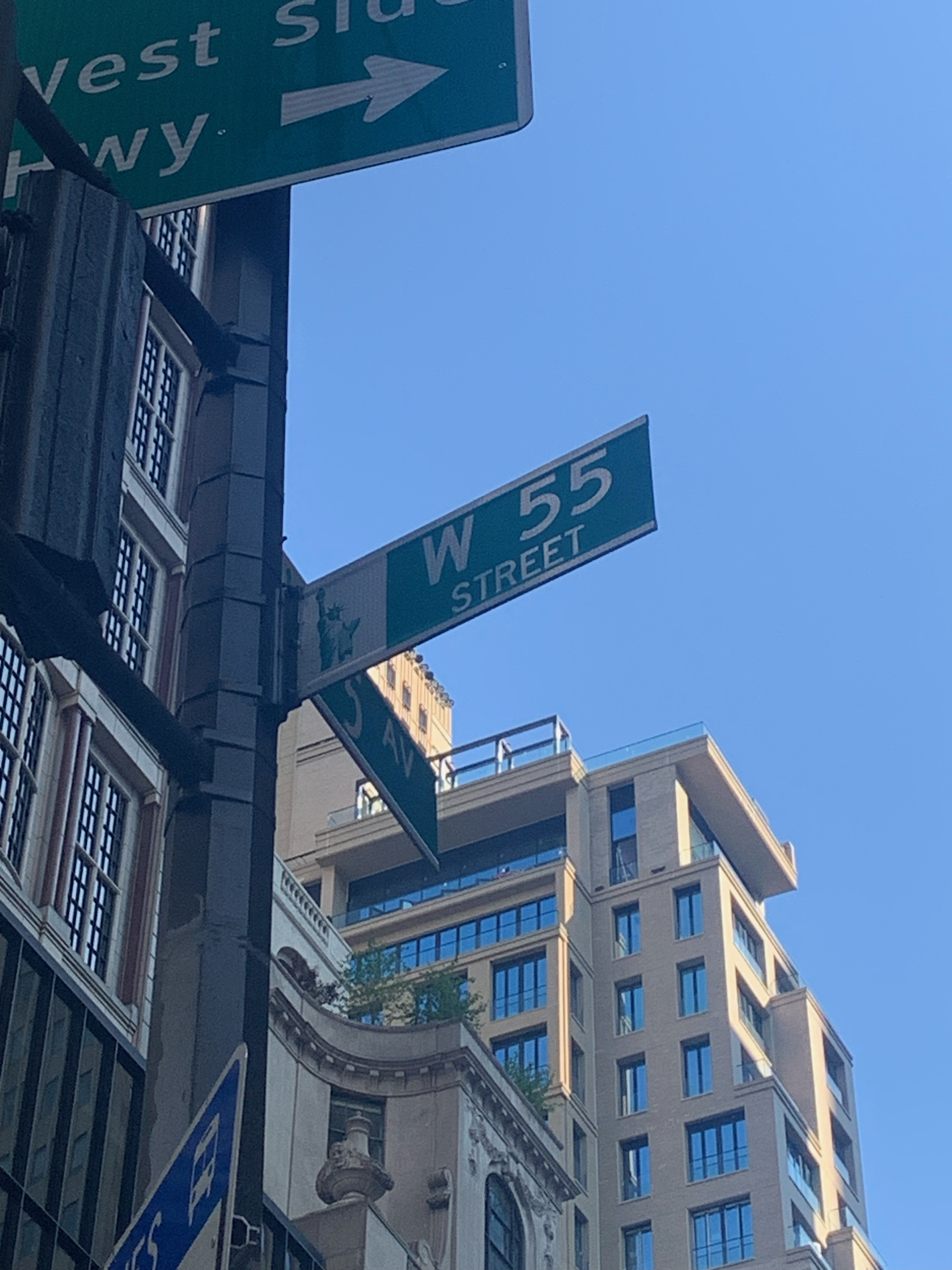
Image of W 55th Street Sign at the intersection of W 55th and 5th Ave

=== Fifth Avenue ===
- The Peninsula New York, 21-story, 250 ft (76 m) hotel completed in 1905 (south)
- Fifth Avenue Presbyterian Church (north)
- MGM Building, 35-story, 416 ft (127 m) office tower completed in 1966 (south)
- Rockefeller Apartments (south)
- 46 West 55th Street (south), a landmarked house

=== Sixth Avenue ===
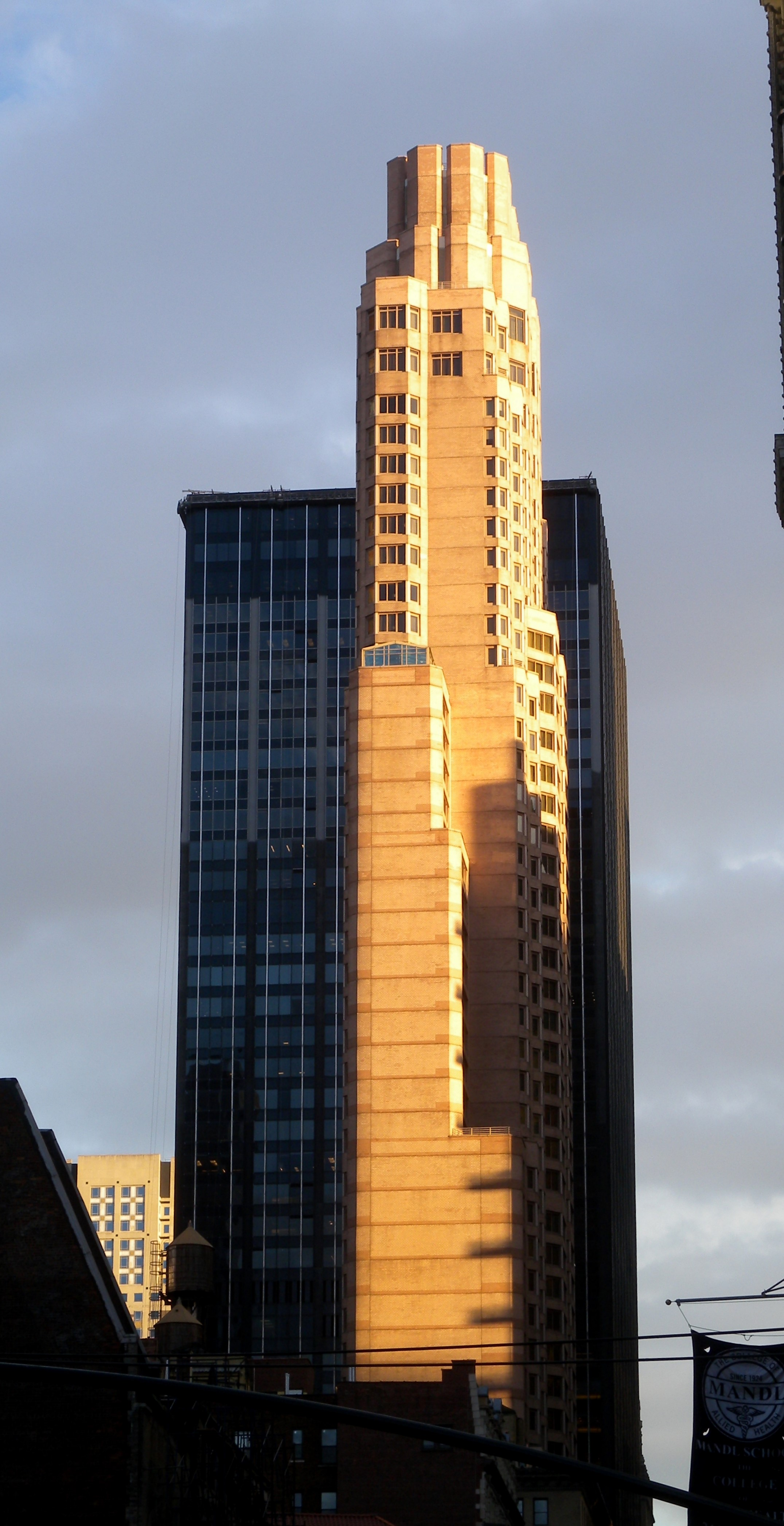
The London Hotel seen from 54th St

- Robert Indiana Love (sculpture) (south)
- Capitol-EMI Building 34-story, 470 ft (140 m) building (north)
- 1345 Avenue of the Americas, 50 story, 625 ft (191 m) building completed in 1969 (south)
- 125 West 55th Street (north)
- New York City Center, theatre at 131 West 55th Street (north)
- 55th Street Playhouse, theatre at 154 West 55th Street
- CitySpire Center (north), 75-story, 814 ft (248 m) tower (tallest on street), north
- The London NYC 54-floor, 590 ft (180 m) tower completed in 1990 (south)
- Hotel Wellington (north)

=== Seventh Avenue ===
- Park Central Hotel, 25-story, 357 ft (109 m) tower completed in 1926 most famous for mafia execution in the barber shop (north)
- Dream Hotel (south)
- Mutual of New York Building, 27-story, 375 ft (114 m) building completed in 1950 whose sign inspired the song Mony, Mony

=== Broadway ===
- Random House Tower, 52-story, 684 ft (208 m) tower (north)
- Former original location of Soup Nazi from Seinfeld

=== Eighth Avenue ===
- The Starwood Apts. at 321 West 55th Street was built in 1907. Over the years, it has been the residence of theatrical figures such as Tony Award winners Jane Alexander (former head of the National Endowment for the Arts) and Michael Stewart, librettist of Hello, Dolly!

=== Ninth Avenue ===
- Alvin Ailey Dance Hall (north)
- Julia Miles Theatre (Off Broadway venue) (south)
- Independent High School (north)

=== Tenth Avenue ===
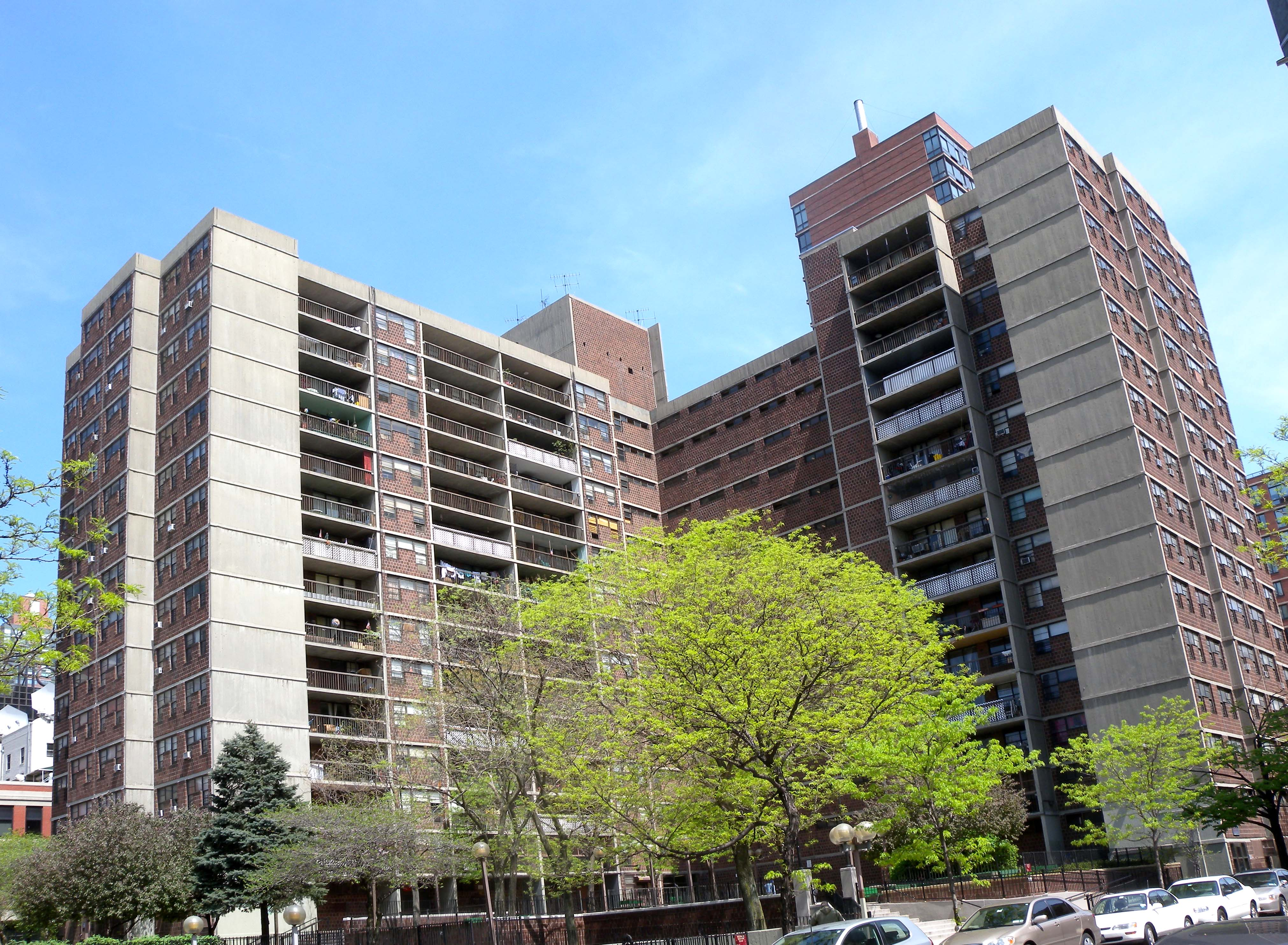
Harbor View Terrace, public housing

- Harborview Terrace, New York City Housing Authority complex (north and south)
- Clinton Towers Apartments 39-story apartment completed in 1974

=== Twelfth Avenue/West Side Highway ===
The road crosses a pedestrian island separating 12th Avenue from the West Side Highway (one of the few places where 12th and the West Side Highway are not the same). The route concludes at the West Side Highway (New York Route 9A). Opposite the intersection is the Hudson River Park and Hudson River.
