= Elizabeth McCaul =

41st New York Superintendent of Banks
- In office June 7, 2000 – June 10, 2003
- Governor: George Pataki
- Preceded by: Neil Levin
- Succeeded by: Diana Taylor

Personal details
- Spouse: Frank Ingrassia
- Children: 7
- Education: Boston University

Elizabeth McCaul has been a member of the European Central Bank's supervisory board since 2019. She previously served as superintendent of banks for New York state, and as the head of the New York State Banking Department. Before that, McCaul held senior executive positions at Promontory Financial Group, an IBM company.

== Career ==
McCaul began her career in 1985 as an investment banker at Goldman Sachs, where she specialized in energy and project financing.

=== New York State Banking Department ===
In 1995, she joined the New York State Banking Department as chief of staff to Neil D. Levin, a former Goldman Sachs colleague who had been appointed superintendent of banks. McCaul became acting superintendent in 1997 upon Levin's departure, and she continued in that capacity for two years. She established the department's Tokyo office, its second permanent office outside the U.S.

New York governor George Pataki nominated McCaul in December 1999 to become superintendent. Her nomination was confirmed by the New York State Senate on June 7, 2000. The role involved regulating and supervising the state's 3,500 financial institutions. Her office established a claims processing office to assist Holocaust survivors and their heirs who were trying to recover assets wrongfully held or stolen in World War II. Her office blocked a proposed merger of the Union Bank of Switzerland and the Swiss Bank Corporation until the banks promised to cooperate on the return of victims' assets.

McCaul oversaw initiatives to ensure that the New York banking system functioned well in the aftermath of the September 11, 2001, terrorist attacks.

McCaul negotiated, along with several state attorneys general, a $484 million multistate settlement with Household International Inc. regarding its residential mortgage lending practices. The settlement, which provided $37 million in restitution to up to 25,000 New York borrowers, was at the time the largest predatory lending settlement recorded in the U.S.

In March 2003, McCaul announced that she would step down as superintendent after a short transition period, citing personal reasons. She had recently given birth to her fifth child. At the end of her tenure, McCaul had served eight years with the department and six years as its chief.

=== Promontory Financial Group ===
In September 2003, McCaul joined Promontory Financial Group, a consulting firm recently established in Washington, D.C. by former U.S. Comptroller of the Currency Eugene Ludwig. She opened the firm's New York office to serve global banks and investment houses, and was its partner-in-charge until 2016. In that year, she became chief executive of Promontory Europe, responsible or overseeing and directing the firm's operations in continental Europe. She became global head of strategy and chair of Promontory Financial Group Europe in 2019.

During 2012 and 2013, McCaul headed a federally mandated review of mortgage foreclosure practices at Bank of America.

In 2013, the Vatican selected Promontory Financial Group to conduct a forensic review of the Vatican Bank, which McCaul led. Within 48 hours of being hired, Promontory had a 25-person team in place in the bank president's ceremonial offices, charged with examining thousands of electronic and paper documents, including some that were written in Latin.

In July 2016, McCaul discussed the Vatican's financial reforms at the annual meeting of the Leadership Roundtable, a Catholic 501(c)(3) nonprofit organization that promotes best practices and accountability in church management, finances, and administration. McCaul said that in 2013, the year the Vatican hired Promontory, confidence in the church and its bank had been undermined by a lack of transparency, internal controls and adherence to international regulatory practices. The financial reforms advocated by Pope Francis helped to make the church and its institutions more transparent, better governed, compliant with regulations and sustainable, she said, adding, “the days of ripping off the Vatican are over."

On July 11, 2019, the European Central Bank announced it had named McCaul to a non-renewable five-year term as a member of its supervisory board. The board plans and carries out the European Central Bank's responsibilities in overseeing the eurozone's banks under European Banking Supervision.

== Personal ==
McCaul is a graduate of Boston University. She and her husband, Frank Ingrassia, are the parents of seven children.

== Affiliations and honors ==
McCaul is a trustee of Hofstra University and of Cold Spring Harbor Laboratory and is a member of the board of directors of Accion International, a global nonprofit that supports microfinance initiatives and financial inclusion. As New York State Banking Superintendent, she served as chairman of the Conference of State Bank Supervisors from 2001 to 2002 and was a member of the Federal Financial Institutions Examination Council from 2002 to 2003.

With her husband, McCaul received the 2012 Humanitarian Award from the Juvenile Diabetes Research Foundation's New York City chapter.
