= IBM Consulting =

Professional services arm of IBM Corporation

- Company type: Division
- Industry: Information technology consulting Outsourcing
- Founded: June 16, 1991; 34 years ago
- Headquarters: Armonk, New York, U.S.
- Key people: Arvind Krishna, Mark Foster, Chairman; John Granger, Senior VP; Kelly Chambliss, SVP & COO
- Parent: IBM (1991–present)
- Website: ibm.com/consulting

IBM Consulting, rebranded in 2021 from IBM Global Business Services, is the professional services and consulting arm of IBM. It provides services to companies, global government organizations, non-profits and NGOs.

It has approximately 160,000 employees globally, with capabilities spanning strategy and management consulting, experience design, technology and systems integration, and operations.

== History ==
IBM's early involvement in IT services can be traced back to the mid-seventies and its Data Processing Support Services (DPSS) division. At the time, the company was under regulatory pressure to unbundle its support services from the sale of hardware. Additionally, with the launch of its early teleprocessing and database products, such as CICS and IMS, many customers could acquire the expertise needed to build their applications only through hiring consulting services directly from IBM.

Later, in 1989, Eastman Kodak Company and IBM completed an agreement by which IBM designed, built and managed a new state-of-the-art data center for Kodak in Rochester, New York under the brand name ISSC, Integrated Systems Solution Corporation.

Also in 1989, IBM introduced Business Recovery Services, an offering that enables a business to continue operations in the event of an unplanned outage or disaster.

In 1992, the company formed IBM Consulting Group, as a new management consulting organization with service lines in Business Transformation and IT Strategy Consulting. This initiative was led by Robert M. Howe, IBM vice-president and general manager of IBM Consulting Group. The group was rebranded to IBM Business Innovation Services in 2001, and then IBM Business Consulting Services. As the management consulting became more entangled with more technology delivery, the integrated organization became known as IBM Global Business Services.

In 2002, IBM acquired the management consulting and technology services arm of PricewaterhouseCoopers, around the same time some other Big Four accounting firms were selling off their consulting arms (this was in order to avoid conflicts of interest in light of the Sarbanes-Oxley Act). PwC's consultancy business was sold to IBM for approximately US$3.9 billion in cash and stock. This nearly doubled the number of consultants within IBM Global Services, adding 30,000 consultants in 52 countries.

In 2016, IBM announced its planned acquisition of Promontory Financial Group in September 2016 and completed the transaction in November 2016.

In October 2021, IBM Global Business Services was renamed IBM Consulting after the spin-off of IBM's Global Technology Services division into Kyndryl Holdings.

== Organizational structure ==
IBM Consulting has three main divisions:

- Business Transformation Services
- Cybersecurity Services
- Hybrid Cloud Services

== Acquisitions ==
Over the years of its operating, IBM Consulting acquired numerous formerly independent consulting companies:

- PricewaterhouseCoopers (PwC) Consulting, 2002
- Bluewolf, 2016
- Resource/Ammirati, 2016
- Promontory Financial Group, 2016
- TruQua, 2020
- 7Summits, 2021
- BoxBoat, 2021
- SXiQ, 2021
- Sentaca, 2022
- Neudesic, 2022
- Dialexa, 2022
- Octo, 2022
- Apptio, 2023

== See also ==
- Outline of consulting
