= Levin Institute =

The Neil D. Levin Graduate Institute of International Relations and Commerce (the Levin Institute) was established by Governor George Pataki and the State of New York in late 2001 in memory of Neil D. Levin, who died in the attack upon the World Trade Center on September 11, 2001.

Levin was the executive director of the Port Authority of New York and New Jersey, which operates New York's major airports, port facilities, bridges, and tunnels, and also administered the World Trade Center complex for most of its history.

The institute is located in the Manhattan borough of New York City and is part of the State University of New York (SUNY). It is the 65th institution in the SUNY system, and is housed in the historic William and Helen Ziegler House, now named the SUNY Global Center.
