= Neil David Levin =

American politician (1954-2001)

Executive Director of the Port Authority of New York and New Jersey
- In office April 2001 – September 11, 2001
- Nominated by: George Pataki
- Preceded by: Robert E. Boyle
- Succeeded by: Ronald Shiftan

Superintendent of Insurance of New York
- In office April 1, 1997 – April 5, 2001
- Governor: George Pataki
- Preceded by: Edward J. Muhl
- Succeeded by: Gregory V. Serio

Superintendent of Banks of New York
- In office February 14, 1995 – April 1997
- Governor: George Pataki
- Preceded by: Carmine M. Tenga
- Succeeded by: Elizabeth McCaul

Personal details
- Born: Neil David Levin; September 16, 1954 New York City, U.S.
- Died: September 11, 2001 (aged 46) North Tower, World Trade Center, New York City, U.S.
- Cause of death: Collapse of 1 World Trade Center during the September 11 attacks
- Spouse: Christy Ferer (m. 1996)
- Children: 2
- Education: Lafayette College (BA); Long Island University (MBA); Hofstra University (JD)

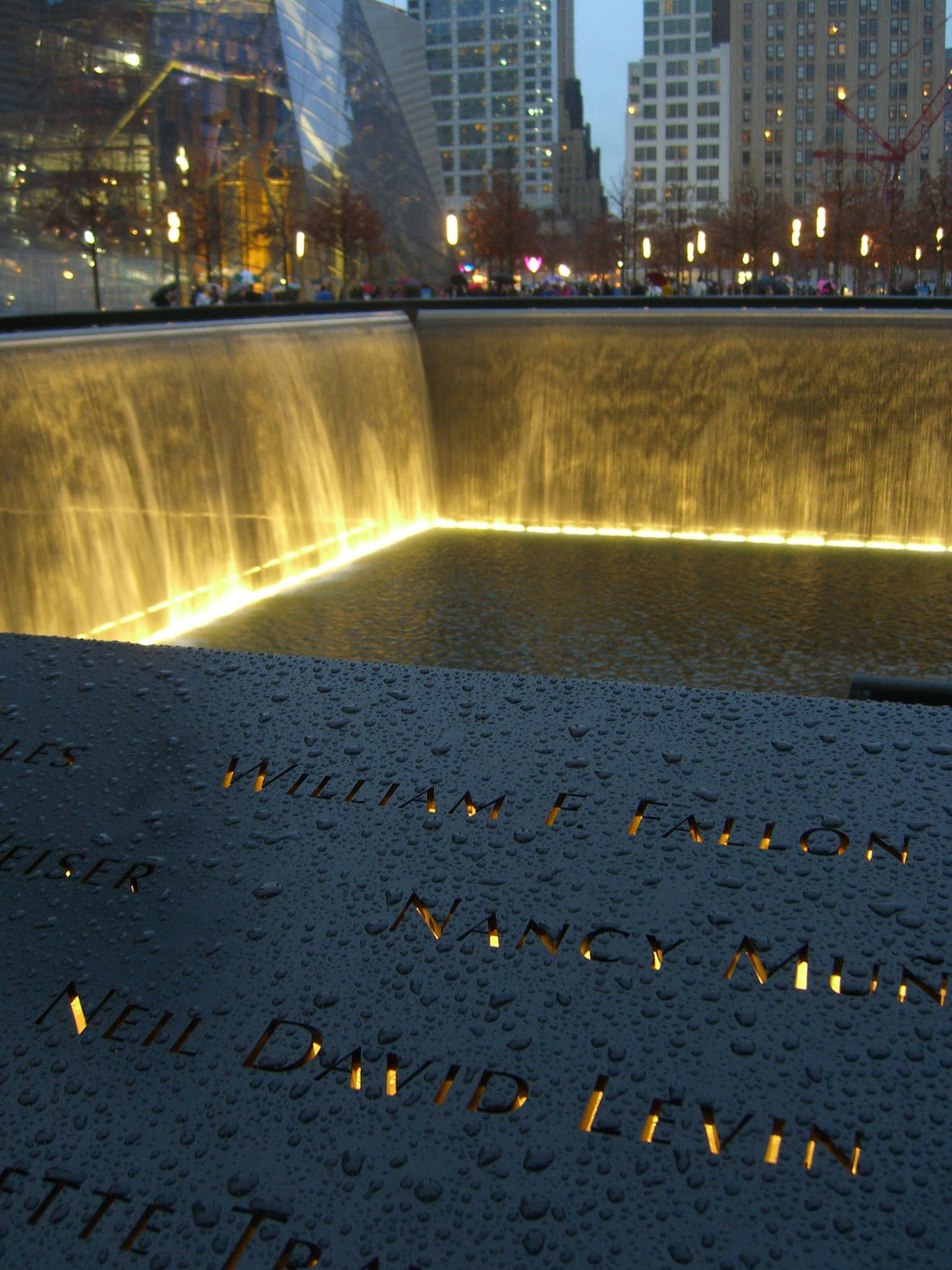
Levin's name is located on Panel N-65 of the National September 11 Memorial's North Pool.

Neil David Levin (September 16, 1954 – September 11, 2001) was an American businessman and political figure who was executive director of the Port Authority of New York and New Jersey from April 2001 until his death during the September 11 attacks on the World Trade Center later that year.

== Early life and education ==
Levin was born to a Jewish family and was native of Brooklyn. He earned a bachelor's degree in economics from Lafayette College in Easton, Pennsylvania and an MBA from Long Island University at its C. W. Post Center, followed by a Juris Doctor degree from the Maurice A. Deane School of Law at Hofstra University.

== Career ==
After completing his law degree, Levin became counsel to the securities subcommittee of the U.S. Senate Banking Committee, where he helped draft the 1984 Insider Trading Sanctions Act.

In 1987 he went to work for Goldman Sachs, becoming vice president in 1989 and providing investment banking to federal agencies. He was also chairman of the Federal Home Loan Bank Board of New York for seven years and an adviser to the federal home loan programs Fannie Mae and Freddie Mac.

In February 1995, Levin was appointed by New York Governor George Pataki to serve as the state's Superintendent of Banks. He took over from acting Superintendent Carmine M. Tenga. In this role, Levin was the state's chief banking regulator, head of the Department of Banking, and Chairman of the State Banking Board. Elizabeth McCaul became acting superintendent.

In 1997, Pataki named Levin as the state Superintendent of Insurance, the state's chief insurance regulator. At the same time, Pataki named him the Chairman of the Commission on the Recovery of Holocaust Victims' Assets, which arranged for the return of assets to families in New York.

In early 2001, Pataki and then New Jersey Governor Donald DiFrancesco named Levin as the executive director of the Port Authority, the agency that runs the World Trade Center, various bridges and tunnels around New York City, the three airports in the New York City area, the seaports in New York and New Jersey, and various international trade programs. Levin was executive director for five months before his death.

== September 11 attacks and death ==
Levin worked in a corner office on the 67th floor of the World Trade Center's North Tower. On September 11, 2001, Levin was at the Windows on the World restaurant on the 106th and 107th floors of the North Tower. When American Airlines Flight 11 was deliberately crashed into the tower between floors 93–99 at 8:46 A.M., all escape routes were cut off for anyone higher than the 91st floor, and Levin became one of roughly 800 people trapped in the upper floors of the burning skyscraper. Levin eventually perished when the North Tower collapsed at 10:28 A.M., killing all remaining survivors that were trapped above the impact zone. His body was recovered in April 2002, nearly seven months after the attacks.

Before the tower was struck, Levin was speaking on the phone with his executive adviser, Karen Eastman. She later related that when American Airlines Flight 11 hit the tower, "Our reaction was 'What was that?' It hit on the opposite side so we just felt the impact and the building kept shaking and swaying for a long time."

== Personal life and legacy ==
Levin married Christy Ferer in 1996; they had two children from her previous marriage.

At the National 9/11 Memorial, Levin is memorialized at the North Pool, on Panel N-65. He is buried at Mount Lebanon Cemetery in Glendale, Queens, New York.

The Neil D. Levin Graduate Institute of International Relations and Commerce was established by Governor George Pataki and the State of New York in his memory, and is a part of the State University of New York.

| Preceded by Carmine M. Tenga | Superintendent of Banks of New York; February 14, 1995 – April 1997 | Succeeded by Elizabeth McCaul |
| Preceded by Edward J. Muhl | Superintendent of Insurance of New York; April 1, 1997 – April 5, 2001 | Succeeded by Gregory V. Serio |
| Preceded by Robert Boyle | Executive Director of the Port Authority of New York and New Jersey; April 2001 – September 2001 | Succeeded by Joseph Seymour |
