= Richard H. Neiman =

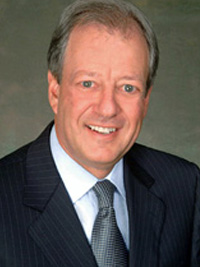

43rd New York Superintendent of Banks
- In office March 5, 2007 – May 6, 2011
- Appointed by: Eliot Spitzer
- Governor: Eliot Spitzer; David Paterson; Andrew Cuomo
- Preceded by: Diana Taylor
- Succeeded by: Regina A. Stone (acting)

Personal details
- Born: 1951 (age 74–75)
- Education: American University (BA); Emory University (JD)

Richard H. Neiman (born 1950) is an American financial advisor and attorney who served as the 43rd Superintendent of Banks of New York, managing the New York State Banking Department.

== Education ==
Neiman received his bachelor's degree from American University in 1972, and a juris doctor from the Emory University School of Law in 1975.

== Career ==
Neiman began his career with the Office of the Comptroller of the Currency in Washington, D.C. where he served as Special Assistant to the Chief Counsel. After the Comptroller's Office, he spent 10 years at Citigroup, where he held a variety of legal and regulatory positions, including General Counsel of its Global Equities Group. Mr. Neiman then returned to Washington, D.C. to serve as Director of Regulatory Advisory Services for Price Waterhouse. In 1994, Mr. Neiman joined TD Waterhouse., a bank holding company and global online financial services firm, as Executive Vice President and General Counsel. He remained with TD Waterhouse until its merger into TD Ameritrade in 2006.

On November 14, 2008 Neiman was appointed by United States House of Representatives Speaker Nancy Pelosi to serve on the five-member Congressional Oversight Panel created to oversee the implementation of the Emergency Economic Stabilization Act of 2008.

In October 2010, Neiman joined the Executive Committee to coordinate the 50 state Attorneys General and 39 state banking agencies investigating allegations of the use of fraudulent documentation by mortgage servicers in the foreclosure process. Neiman is also one of the three bank regulators participating with 12 Attorneys General in the State Foreclosure Prevention Working Group, a multi-state task force established in 2007 seeking to reduce the number of unnecessary foreclosures by encouraging loan modifications and other sustainable long-term solutions by mortgage servicers.

Prior to joining the New York State Banking Department, Neiman served as president and chief executive officer of TD Bank, N.A., a wholly owned subsidiary of the Toronto-Dominion Bank.. He was appointed to serve as the Superintendent of Banks by then-Governor Eliot Spitzer, succeeding Diana Taylor. While Superintendent, his authority over mortgage lending and servicing greatly expanded with new laws in 2008 and 2009.

Neiman stepped down from the New York State Banking Department in 2011 to serve as the vice chairman of the financial services regulatory practice at PricewaterhouseCoopers.

Neiman chairs the Foreign Bank Regulatory Committee of the Conference of State Bank Supervisors. He also chairs New York State's HALT (Halt Abusive Lending Transactions) Task Force to address housing and foreclosure issues in New York. He has testified before Congress several times regarding foreclosure mitigation.

Neiman is on the board of directors and a vice president of the Henry Street Settlement, one of New York’s oldest social services organizations and provider of shelters for the homeless. He also serves on the Board of the Harlem Educational Activities Fund, a mentoring and college preparatory organization serving students in Harlem and Washington Heights.

He received the Foreign Policy Association Medal for Public Service in 2010 and the Rockefeller College of Public Affairs & Policy Distinguished Public Services Award in 2009.
