= Robert L. Clarke =

US Comptroller of the Currency

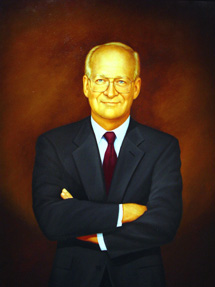
- Portrait of Robert L. Clarke

26th Comptroller of the Currency
- In office December 2, 1985 - February 29, 1992
- President: Ronald W. Reagan; George H. W. Bush
- Preceded by: C. T. Conover
- Succeeded by: Eugene Ludwig

Personal details
- Born: 29 June 1942 (age 83) Tulsa, Oklahoma
- Occupation: Attorney

Robert L. Clarke (born June 29, 1942) was Comptroller of the Currency of the United States from 1985-1992. He was born in Tulsa, Oklahoma.

Clarke, a Texas banking attorney at Bracewell LLP, was nominated by President Ronald Reagan and confirmed by the U.S. Senate. His tenure coincided with an era of extraordinary turbulence in financial institutions and the financial marketplace in the United States.

Under Clarke, the agency strengthened its managerial and supervisory capabilities to deal with changes and stresses in the national banking system. Clarke led the effort to expand the national bank powers to better meet the competition from non-bank providers of financial services. His leadership helped to reduce the costs of bank failures and to restore the safety and soundness of the national banking system.

Clarke was nominated to a second five-year term by President George H. W. Bush, but his nomination was blocked by the Senate Banking Committee in November 1991. He remained in office until February 1992, when the office of Comptroller passed to a caretaker, his former deputy Steven R. Steinbrink.

Clarke returned to Bracewell after his term as Comptroller. Since then, Clarke has also taken roles as a consultant to the World Bank and senior advisor to the National Bank of Poland. Clarke was named to the board of the Dubai Financial Services Authority in 2008, where he is still an advisor.

Government offices
Preceded by C. T. Conover	Comptroller of the Currency; 1985–1992	Succeeded by Eugene Ludwig
