= John G. Heimann =

American government official (1929–2024)

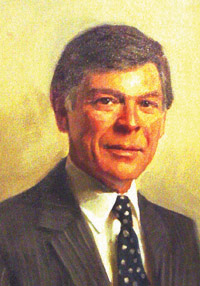

24th Comptroller of the Currency
- In office July 21, 1977 – May 15, 1981
- President: Jimmy Carter; Ronald Reagan
- Preceded by: James E. Smith
- Succeeded by: C. T. Conover

Acting Chair of the Federal Deposit Insurance Corporation
- In office August 16, 1978 – February 7, 1979
- President: Jimmy Carter
- Preceded by: George A. LeMaistre
- Succeeded by: Irvine H. Sprague

Personal details
- Born: April 1, 1929 New York City, New York, U.S.
- Died: January 31, 2024 (aged 94) Manhattan, New York, U.S.
- Occupation: Investment banker

John G. Heimann (April 1, 1929 – January 31, 2024) was an American government official who was Comptroller of the Currency from 1977 to 1981, having been appointed by President Jimmy Carter and confirmed by the Senate.

== Biography ==
Heimann was an investment banker. Prior to this role he was the New York State Superintendent of Banking and subsequently Commissioner of Housing and Community Development.

During his term as Comptroller, Heimann also served as acting chairman of the FDIC and as the first chairman of the Federal Financial Institutions Examination Council. He was an active participant in the reform effort that lifted the limits on, and differentials between, the interest rates that different types of financial institutions could pay to attract deposits. He returned to investment banking in 1981, joining Warburg Paribas Becker. His career in the private sector includes: a founding partner of Warburg Pincus; Co-chairman of Warburg Paribas Becker; and Chairman of the Global Financial Institutions Group of Merrill Lynch and chairman, Merrill Lynch Europe, Middle East and Africa. He was a Director and Treasurer of the Urban Assembly; Director, Accion; Director, InterAudi Bank; Director, New Smith Capital; Executive Committee, French American Foundation; Director. Essential Capital Consortium, Deutsche Bank. He served as a Trustee of the Nasher Sculpture Center; Director of the American Ditchley Foundation; member of the Council on Foreign Relations; a member of the Group of Thirty; a Director of the Chatham House Foundation; and a Director, Paul Taylor Modern Dance Company.

In the past Heimann served as co-chairman of the 2020 Andean Committee, Council on Foreign Relations; and was the Founding Chairman of the Financial Stability Institute of the Bank for International Settlements. He was a member of the Strategic Committee of the French Tresor; Co-chairman of the Federal Reserve Bank of New York International Capital Markets Committee; Member of the executive committee of the Toronto International Leadership Center for Financial Sector Supervision; Executive Committee of Institute of International Finance; Chairman of the Financial Services Council; Director, Securities Industries Association; Director, National Policy Association; Governor, Atlantic Institute; Member and chairman of the council, British Banking and Securities Association, and Director ACG, Holding Ltd. He was Chairman of the NY State Superintendent's Advisory Committee on Transnational Banking Institutions; chairman, New York State Executive Advisory Commission on the Insurance Industry Regulatory Reform.

Heimann also served as a Director of Hampshire College; Yale School of Management; Prep for Prep; Markle Foundation; Citizen's Committee for NYC; and co-chairman, British North American Committee.

Heimann lectured at Harvard University, Graduate School of Business Administration; Kennedy School of Government and Politics; Yale University; University of California, Berkeley; Columbia University; New York University.

Heimann died in Manhattan on January 31, 2024, at the age of 94.

== Awards ==
Heimann received awards, including:

- Alexander Hamilton Award, Department of the Treasury
- Bank Administration Institute, Key for Distinguished Service
- National Housing Conference, “Housing Man of the Year”
- Chancellor Medal, Syracuse University
- St Michael's College, Doctor of Laws, Winooski, Vermont
- Columbia University, Distinguished Lecturer, School of International Affairs
- National Conference of Christians and Jews, Brotherhood Award
- National Association of Bank Women, Inc., Pacesetter Award

Heimann was also honored as The New Jewish Home's Eight over Eighty Gala 2018 honoree.
