= GCM Grosvenor =

American alternative asset management firm

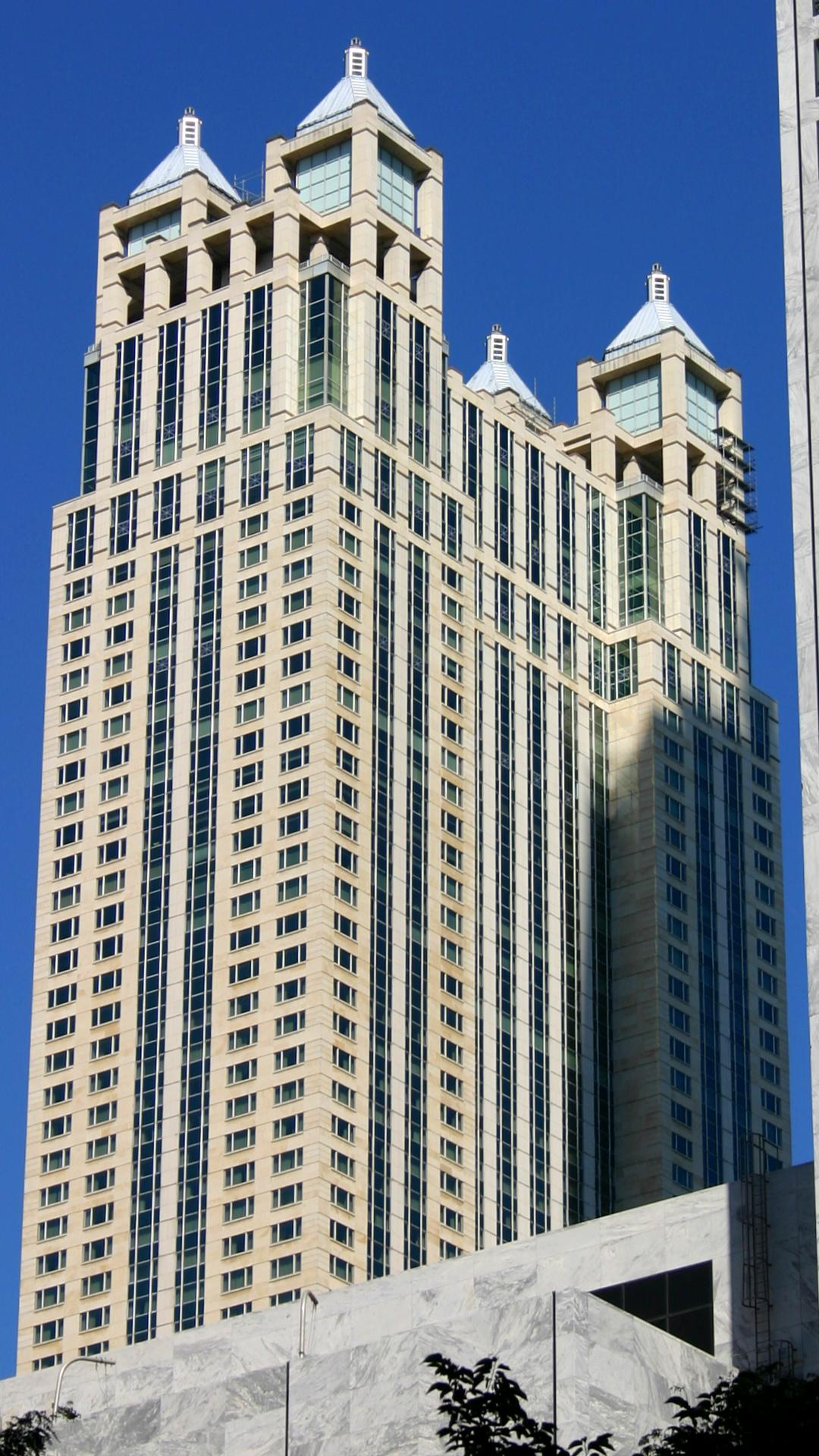
- Headquarters at 900 North Michigan
- Type: Public company
- Traded as: Nasdaq: GCMG
- Industry: Investment management
- Founded: 1971
- Founder: Richard Elden
- Headquarters: 900 North Michigan; Chicago, Illinois, United States
- Key people: Michael Sacks
- Products: Hedge funds, private equity, infrastructure, real estate credit, multi-asset class, ESG
- Revenue: ▲US$558 million (2025)
- Net income: ▲US$45.4 million (2025)
- AUM: $91 billion (2026)
- Total assets: ▲US$814 million (2025)
- Total equity: ▲US$27.0 million (2025)
- Number of employees: 500+
- Website: www.gcmgrosvenor.com

GCM Grosvenor (Nasdaq: GCMG) is a global alternative asset management firm headquartered in Chicago, Illinois, and founded in 1971. The firm's managed investments include private equity, credit, infrastructure, and real estate.

The firm manages separate accounts and investment funds for institutional and individual investors. These include direct and co-investments, primary fund investments, and secondary investments.

== History ==
Grosvenor Capital Management was founded in 1971 by Richard Elden, an early investor in hedge funds in the United States. Frank Meyer, who had worked with Elden at investment firm A.G. Becker, subsequently joined the firm in 1973.

The firm initially focused on hedge fund investing and became an early participant in the industry. Michael J. Sacks joined the firm in 1990 and became chief executive officer in 1994.

In January 2014, GCM Grosvenor acquired the Customized Fund Investment Group (CFIG) from Credit Suisse Group AG. The acquisition expanded its business beyond its historical focus on hedge funds and created a combined firm with $44 billion in assets under management.

In August 2020, the firm announced an agreement to merge with CF Finance Acquisition Corp. (“CFAC”) (NASDAQ: CFFA), a special purpose acquisition company sponsored by Cantor Fitzgerald. The transaction valued GCM Grosvenor at approximately $2 billion.

The company began trading publicly on November 18, 2020. The combined company was renamed GCM Grosvenor Inc. and the Class A common stock began trading on The Nasdaq Capital Market under the ticker symbol “GCMG.” The firm's management team, led by Sacks, remained in place following the transaction.

In March 2025, the firm announced a joint venture called Grove Lane Partners to expand its distribution to broker dealers, investment advisors, and wirehouses.

As of the second quarter of 2026, GCM Grosvenor had approximately $97 billion in assets under management and employed approximately 550 people across nine offices.
