= William and Helen Ziegler House =

House in Manhattan, New York

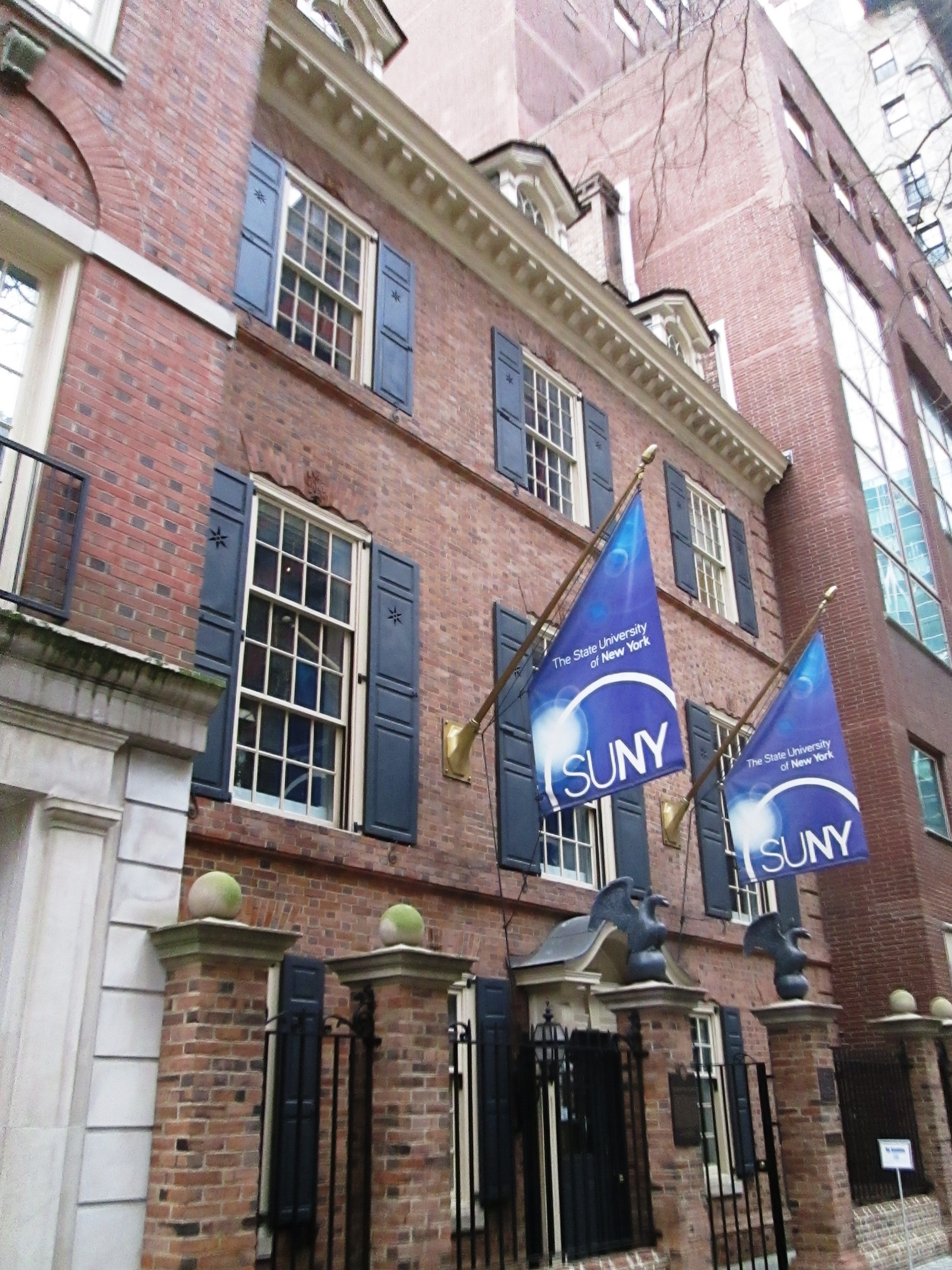
- (2017)
- Interactive map of the William and Helen Ziegler House area

General information
- Type: Town house converted to offices
- Architectural style: Neo-Georgian
- Location: 116 East 55th Street; Manhattan, New York City
- Coordinates: 40°45′36″N 73°58′15″W
- Current tenants: SUNY Global Center
- Construction started: 1926
- Completed: 1927
- Client: William Ziegler Jr.

Design and construction
- Architect: William Lawrence Bottomley

New York City Landmark
- Designated: May 1, 2001
- Reference no.: 2084

The William and Helen Ziegler House (also known as the William and Helen Martin Murphy Ziegler Jr. House), located at 116 East 55th Street between Park and Lexington Avenues in the Midtown neighborhood of Manhattan, New York City, was built in 1926–27 and was designed by William Lawrence Bottomley in the Neo-Georgian syle, which Bottomley specialized in during the 1920s and 1930s.

The 37.5-foot wide house's four-and-a-half story facade features Flemish blond brickwork with burnt leaders, splayed lintels and end quoins, along with paneled wood shutters and a grey slate roof that is steeply pitched with set-in dormer windows and end chimneys.

William Ziegler Jr., who was a businessman, sportsman, and philanthropist – he was the head of several foundations for the blind – lived in the house until 1958, after which it was converted into offices for Welton Becket's New York architecture branch. It was then purchased by the Radio Advertising Bureau (US) in 1962, then Allied Bank International from 1969-1986, BBVA's Ancla Investments from 1986-2001, then TIAA in March 2001. The building was designated a New York City landmark on May 1, 2001.

It is currently used by the State University of New York, as the SUNY Global Center, which houses the Levin Graduate Institute of International Relations and Commerce.

== See also ==
- List of New York City Designated Landmarks in Manhattan from 14th to 59th Streets
