= C. T. Conover =

American banking regulatory official

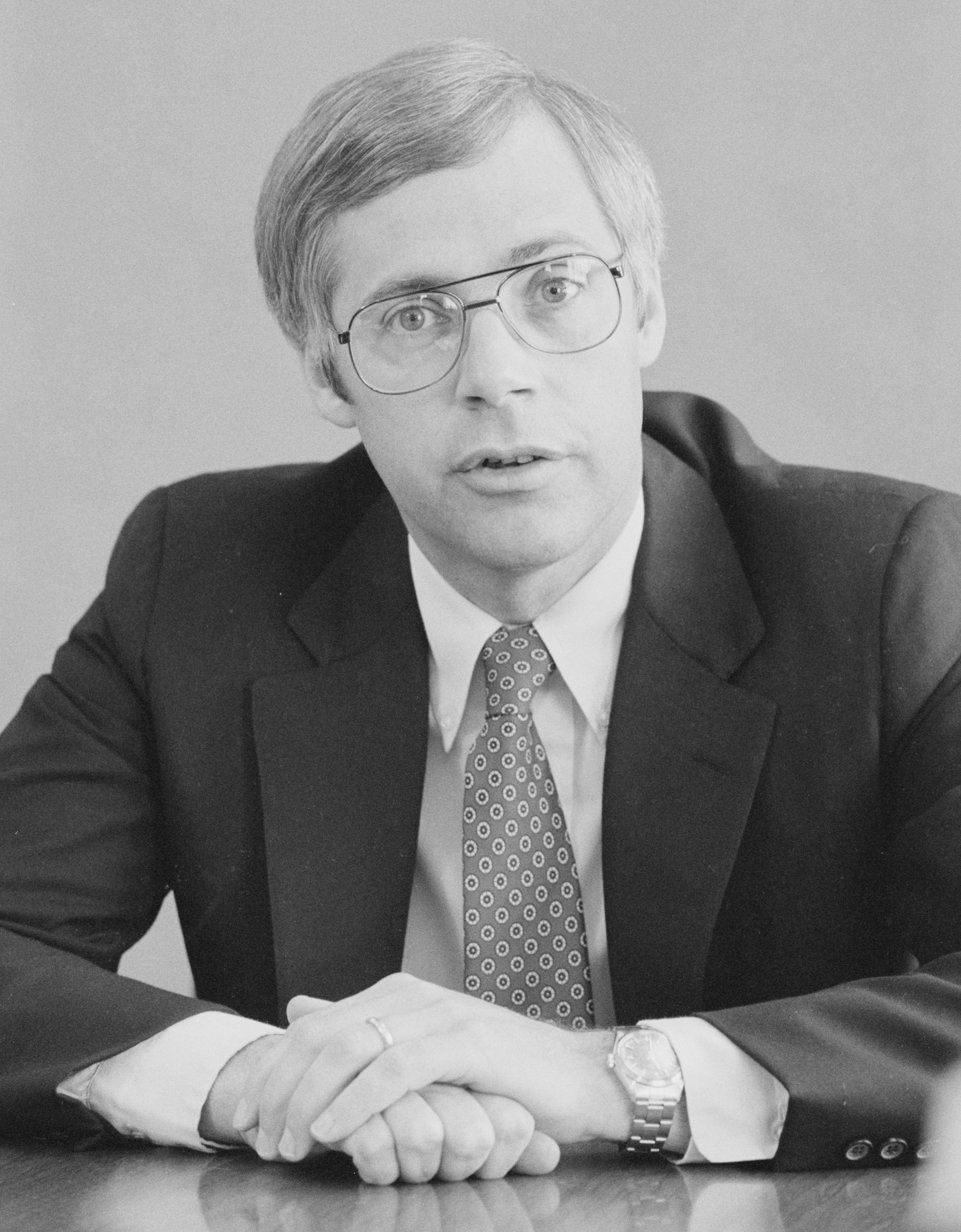
- Conover in 1983

25th Comptroller of the Currency
- In office December 16, 1981 - May 4, 1985
- President: Ronald Reagan
- Preceded by: John G. Heimann
- Succeeded by: Robert L. Clarke

Personal details
- Born: October 13, 1939 Bronxville, New York, U.S.
- Died: December 9, 2018 (aged 79) Meadow Vista, California, U.S.
- Spouse: Sally Conover
- Education: Yale University, University of California
- Occupation: banking and management consultant

C. Todd Conover (October 13, 1939 – December 9, 2018) was Comptroller of the Currency in the United States from 1981 to 1985 He was born in Bronxville, New York.

Conover, a California banking and management consultant, was named Comptroller by President Ronald Reagan. He presided over the agency during a period of dramatic change in financial services as deregulation increased competition and the services offered by banks.

Under Conover's guidance, national banks began to offer discount brokerage services and investment advice and underwrite certain kinds of insurance. He reduced the number of regional offices to six, increasing their staffs and authority. After Conover's resignation in 1985, he returned to his bank consulting practice.

He died in Meadow Vista, California on December 9, 2018.
