= Harborview Terrace =

Public housing in Manhattan, New York

Harborview Terrace Houses
- NYCHA Property
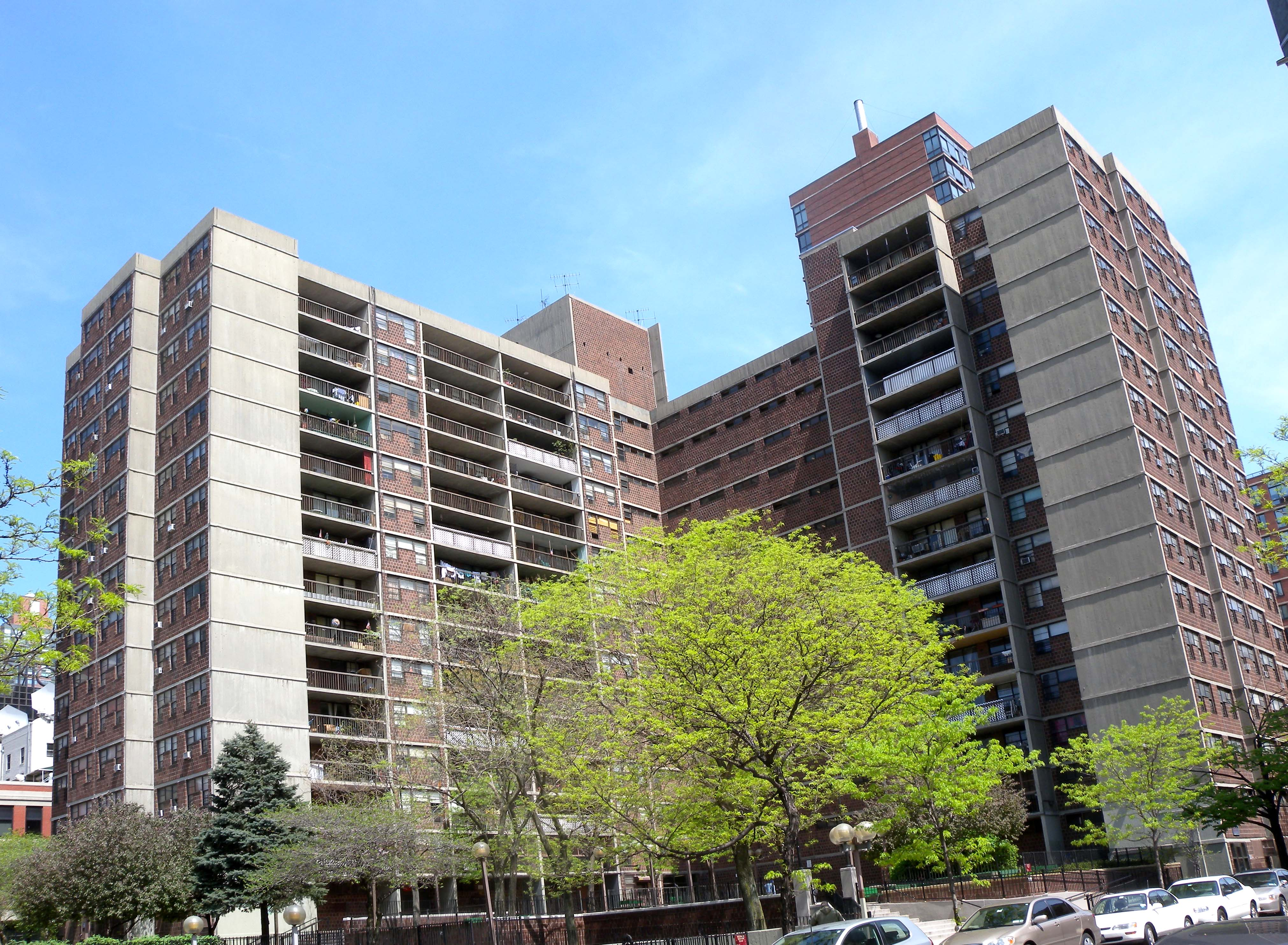
- Interactive map of Harborview Terrace Houses
- Country: United States
- State: New York
- City: New York City
- Borough: Manhattan

Area
  - Total: 2.82 acres (1.14 ha)

Population
  - Total: 559
- ZIP Code: 10019

The Harborview Terrace Houses is a public housing project owned by the New York City Housing Authority (NYCHA) with two buildings. The housing complex is located between West 54th to 56th Streets and 10th and 11th Avenues in the Hell's Kitchen neighborhood of Manhattan, New York City. Building I has 15 Floors, where the management office is located, and Building II has 14 Floors.

== History ==
The site of the housing complex was condemned by the city as a result of the Clinton Urban Renewal Area, which was designated in 1969 and encompassed the area between 10th and 11th Avenues from 50th to 56th Streets. In 1972, the Board of Estimate approved a Large Scale Residential Development Plan (LSRD) and plans for the development of three buildings on the site were filed. The housing complex was completed by NYCHA in June 1977 and formally dedicated on November 15, 1977. Designed by architect Herbert L. Mandel, the project was built using air rights over the West Side Line.

In 2005, an agreement made as part of the Hudson Yards Redevelopment Project called for the development of 155 affordable housing units on the site. Several proposals have been made to redevelop a parking lot on the site with new housing, but plans have been stalled since 2019. The site of the parking lot between 55th and 56th Streets was originally planned to include a 10-story building in the LSRD that was approved in 1972.

On November 10, 2023, a celebration was held to mark the completion of upgrades to the 20,000-square-foot (1,900 m^{2}) open space area outside of the Harborview Terrace Complex, which included a new basketball court, pickleball court, enhanced seating, wall murals, and asphalt art.
