= Aranyosapáti =

Place in Hungary

Coordinates: 48°12′N 22°16′E

- Interactive map of Aranyosapáti
- Country: Hungary
- County: Szabolcs-Szatmár-Bereg

Area
  - Total: 21.36 km^{2} (8.25 sq mi)

Population (2015)
  - Total: 2,047
  - Density: 97.1/km^{2} (251/sq mi)
- Time zone: UTC+1 (CET)
  - Summer (DST): UTC+2 (CEST)
- Postal code: 4634
- Area code: 45

Location of Szabolcs-Szatmar-Bereg county in Hungary

Aranyosapáti is a village in Szabolcs-Szatmár-Bereg county, in the Northern Great Plain region of eastern Hungary. János J. Pataki, the paternal grandfather of former governor of the State of New York, George Pataki, was from Aranyosapáti.

Aranyosapáti was established in 1950 after the unification of two villages: Kopócsapáti and Révaranyos. Jews lived in both villages until they were murdered by the Nazis in the Holocaust.

== Geography ==
It covers an area of 21.36 km^{2} (8 sq mi) and has a population of 2047 people (2015).
