= Michael C. Finnegan =

American lawyer

Michael Finnegan

General Counsel to the Governor of New York
- In office 1995–1997
- Governor: George Pataki
- Succeeded by: James McGuire

Personal details
- Born: 1955 (age 70–71) Peekskill, New York
- Party: Republican
- Education: Siena College; Ohio University
- Occupation: Director of Investment Banking; JPMorgan Chase

Michael C. Finnegan (born 1955 in Peekskill, New York) is the managing director of investment banking for JPMorgan Chase. Finnegan is best known as the architect of former Governor George Pataki's ascendancy to power from Mayor of Peekskill to Governor of New York. Finnegan and Pataki became friends while practicing law in Peekskill and Finnegan would go on to manage Pataki's campaigns for Mayor, State Assembly, State Senate, and the Governorship. Finnegan was then appointed Chief Counsel to the Governor in 1995.

He left the Governor's office in 1997 to begin his career with JPMorgan. He previously taught at his alma mater, Siena College, and was awarded the prestigious Ellis Island Medal of Honor in 1997. He serves on the board of directors for the Irish-American Republicans. In 2008, he was mentioned as a possible strong challenger to freshman Congressman John Hall in New York's 19th congressional district. Finnegan is considered an expert in Irish politics, history and tradition.

== Political career and background ==
Finnegan graduated from Siena College in 1978. He spent a year studying at Ohio University School of Law, until the death of his father caused him to return home in order to support his family. He took a position working in the communication office of James L. Emery, the minority leader of the State Assembly and later worked for Westchester County Executive Andrew P. O'Rourke while attending law school at night at the Pace University School of Law, where he received his Juris Doctor. During his time in Peekskill politics, he became close friends with George Pataki, although Finnegan and Pataki were acquaintances since he was a boy. Finnegan then went to work at Plunkett and Jaffe, P.C., where future Governor Pataki was also a partner.

He managed Pataki's successful campaigns for mayor in 1983, State Assembly in 1984 and 1986, and State Senate in 1992. He also served as General Counsel to the Westchester County Industrial Development Council, as a member of the Peekskill Industrial Development Agency, and part-time as Peekskill's City Prosecutor. By 1992, Finnegan opened his own law firm, working in real estate transactions and environmental law. In 1994, he was architect of Pataki's upset victory for over Governor Mario Cuomo. Pataki and Finnegan were described as politically inseparable.

Their relationship is organic. It's hard to separate the two personalities. Mr. Finnegan's accomplishments as a negotiator were possible only because of the governing style of Mr. Pataki, who allowed his aide to be an unfettered fact finder and arbitrator.

— John R. Nolan, a professor of law at Pace University who has known both Mr. Pataki and Mr. Finnegan since the early 1980s.

Finnegan was Governor Pataki's first appointment in the new administration. He served as General Counsel to the Governor from 1995 to 1997, but was also the leading orchestrator of Pataki's measure that cut income tax rates by 25 percent over four years. In 1995, Finnegan ended a century-long debate when he successfully brokered the New York City Watershed Agreement by leading negotiations among county, state, federal and New York City governments, and the environmental community. Finnegan also conceived and negotiated Pataki's $1.75 billion Clean Water Clean Air Bond Act legislation and functioned as executive director of the Bond Act Committee.

Pataki also named Finnegan to the three-person Commission on Judicial Nominations, which recommends candidates to the state's highest court. He resigned as General Counsel in 1997 to take a management position with JPMorgan Chase. Upon Finnegan's departure, politicians and political analysts agreed there was a substantial void in the Pataki administration, as Finnegan was a practical negotiator with whom even Pataki's greatest opponents said they could work. Finnegan's allies and foes said "he had a rare talent for overcoming partisan barriers, forging compromise, and keeping the spotlight on his boss when something concrete was achieved".

Michael Finnegan has been a key part of virtually every major achievement of my administration. I wish him well.

— George Pataki, Governor of New York

In 2006, State Comptroller Alan Hevesi took criticism after approving a no-bid contract to JPMorgan, which was negotiated in part by Finnegan, although no wrongdoing was found on Finnegan's part. Hevesi would later resign over a separate incident after he pleaded guilty to a defrauding the government.

=== 2008 congressional run ===
There was speculation that Finnegan was being recruited by the National Republican Congressional Committee for a run against freshman incumbent John Hall in New York's 19th congressional district. Finnegan was described as one of the strongest potential challengers to Hall.

Finnegan was described as a moderate Republican. He was a delegate for John McCain to the Republican National Convention during the 2008 Republican Presidential Primary.
