= Daniel E. Wall =

American politician

Daniel E. Wall is the Civil Service Commission President in New York. He was appointed to the position in 2004 by Gov. George Pataki. As commission president, Wall also served as Commissioner of the Department of Civil Service (he no longer holds the title).

For six years prior to being named commission president, Wall served as Executive Deputy Commissioner of Civil Service. From 1995 to 1998, Wall was the Civil Service Department's General Counsel. Prior to joining the Pataki Administration, Wall was an attorney on Long Island.
