= A. G. Becker & Co. =

American investment bank based in Illinois

- Company type: Acquired
- Industry: Financial services
- Founded: 1893
- Founder: Abraham G. Becker
- Defunct: 1984
- Fate: Acquired by Merrill Lynch in 1984
- Headquarters: Chicago, Illinois, U.S. San Francisco, California, U.S.
- Products: Investment banking, brokerage
- Number of employees: 2,450 (1983); 1,600 (1984)

A. G. Becker & Co. was an investment bank based in Chicago, Illinois, United States.

Becker's history goes back to the 1880s when it was a commercial paper house. It evolved into a full line investment banking firm with offices in Chicago, New York, Los Angeles, San Francisco, Boston, London (England) and Geneva (Switzerland), among others.

Becker was a pioneer in the pension consulting business with the creation of "Green Book" tables comparing results to benchmarks, to help identify the performance of institutional investors.

== History ==
=== Founding and early history ===
In 1893, Abraham G. Becker took control of Herbert Schaffner & Co., a commercial paper business in Chicago. The firm, which was founded by Becker's uncle had failed during the Panic of 1893. Becker, who had been a junior partner under Schaffner, paid in $50,000 from a life insurance policy to start his own firm and by 1904 Becker had paid back the losses suffered by Schaffner's customers. Initially, Becker paid needy customers, particularly widows, first out of his own pocket.

Abraham G. Becker, founder of A. G. Becker & Co. in 1893

Through the early part of the 20th century, Becker became one of the leading commercial paper firms in the U.S. Becker's commercial paper business had been founded on the dealing of "bankers acceptances", another form of short term finance for corporate borrowers, that was popular in the Chicago markets. At one point in the development of the commercial paper market in the United States, two banks were the dominant commercial paper dealers: A G Becker (concentrating its business in the MidWest and West and Goldman Sachs (concentrating more on the East Coast and in the various financial markets of New York).

The firm slowly branched out into a stock and bond brokerage. In 1911, the firm completed its first underwriting for Hart Schaffner & Marx. Thereafter, the firm raised debt for U.S. Gypsum and later issued preferred stock for Hupp Motor Works.

By 1919, the firm had opened offices along the west coast in San Francisco, Los Angeles, Portland and Seattle as well as in New York City and St. Louis. Also in 1919, Becker arranged $50 million of notes for Sears, Roebuck & Co. Julius Rosenwald, part-owner of Sears, had tapped his friend Becker to lead the offering.

=== Joint venture with S.G. Warburg and Paribas (1974-1982) ===
In 1974 A.G. Becker entered into a merger with Warburg Paribas, a newly formed American joint venture between London-based S.G. Warburg and Paris-based Paribas (Compagnie Financière de Paris et des Pays-Bas, prior to the bank's nationalization in 1982). As a result of the transaction, the firm operated under the name A.G. Becker-Warburg Paribas Becker and was 40% owned by the two European merchant banks and 60% owned by the existing shareholders of Becker, a combination of employees and management. In 1982, the two European firms increased their stake from 40% to just over 50%, after they made a joint investment of $15 million to $20 million.

The transaction, which had been championed by S.G. Warburg founder Siegmund Warburg and Becker's president Paul Judy, expanded Becker's capital base and added an international dimension to its investment banking business. At the time, the deal was considered emblematic of the globalization of finance.

The joint venture was initially successful in elevating Becker's position in investment banking throughout the mid-1970s. However, the firm was plagued by competition between Warburg and Paribas, as well as cultural conflicts between French, English and American executives and internal management issues in the U.S. In 1978, Becker's president, Paul Judy, an architect of the joint venture was replaced by Ira Wender. Under Wender, a number of key executives who had built the firm either were forced out or left the company.

=== Becker Paribas and the sale to Merrill Lynch (1982-1984) ===
Becker's president Ira Wender was forced out of the firm in 1982 when the firm announced a major restatement of its financials revealing larger operating losses. He was replaced by Daniel J. Good and John G. Heimann. In July 1982, the two European partners increased their stake to just over 50% taking control of the business, in exchange for an equity injection needed to stabilize the company's finances. In October 1982, S.G. Warburg founder Siegmund Warburg, who had been the primary advocate for the Warburg investment in Becker, died. Although Warburg had originally planned to buy out Paribas, after Siegmund Warburg's death, Paribas bought out Warburg's interest in the joint venture in early 1983. Following the departure of Warburg from the joint venture, the firm was renamed A.G. Becker Paribas.

Now effectively in control of the firm, Paribas, took a more visible role in managing Becker. In June 1983, Paribas' president Herve M. Pinet, became chairman and chief executive of Becker, and Daniel J. Good became president and chief operating officer. Even though the profitability of other firms rebounded significantly in the bull market of late 1982 and 1983, Becker continued to sustain losses.

In May 1984, Paribas bought out the 50% of the company owned by employees and other shareholders, taking full control of the business. However, within a few months, Paribas soured on the business after investing additional capital. Becker had lost in excess of $80 million, through the trading of government bonds, in the final months of Paribas' ownership, losing approximately $15 million each month. However, the company suffered more long-term challenges including high overhead costs and decreased revenues from its investment banking as well as equity and fixed income businesses. In May 1984, Becker sold its securities-correspondent business, representing 500 employees or one-third of its workforce, to Pershing LLC, which at the time was owned by Donaldson, Lufkin & Jenrette. Then in August 1984, Paribas announced the sale of the remainder of the company, comprising its investment banking and other securities businesses to Merrill Lynch. Merrill Lynch acquired Becker for $100 million in stock but absorbed only a few hundred of the firm's employees. The acquisition of Becker came on the heels of the purchase of Lehman Brothers Kuhn Loeb by Shearson/American Express and rumors during the summer of 1984 had paired Becker with Paine Webber, Morgan Stanley as well as Nomura.

The purchase of Becker propelled Merrill Lynch to a leadership in the commercial paper markets and also enhanced certain of its investment banking advisory and underwriting businesses. After the acquisition of Becker, a number of executives remained with Merrill, most notably Barry S. Friedberg who would serve as head of Investment Banking in the late 1980s and early 1990s.

== Notable alumni ==
- Richard Driehaus, founder of Driehaus Capital Management began his career in the Institutional Trading department at Becker in the late 1960s.
- Richard Elden, a former analyst at Becker in the 1960s, established Grosvenor Capital Management in 1971. Grosvenor was a pioneer in the hedge fund industry creating the first fund of hedge funds in the United States and as of 2009 managed in excess of $22 billion.
- Barry S. Friedberg, following the purchase of Becker, would go on to be head of Investment Banking at Merrill Lynch, and subsequently rose to the position of Senior Executive Vice President.
- Richard Gilder, founder of Gilder, Gagnon, Howe & Co. began his career as a broker at Becker in the 1960s.
- Lewis Glucksman left Becker in 1963 to help Lehman Brothers enter the commercial paper market; as Lehman's CEO he engineered the storied sale of that firm to American Express.
- Daniel J. Good who became President of EF Hutton LBO, Inc. and Head of Merchant Banking of Shearson Lehman Bros.
- John G. Heimann, former Comptroller of the Currency from 1977 to 1981 would join Becker in July 1982.
- James Melcher (born 1939), Olympic fencer and hedge fund manager
- Jeff Peek, President of CIT Group.
- Donald Rumsfeld spent two years at A.G. Becker, from 1960 to 1962, before winning election to serve in the U.S. House of Representatives. He later served as U.S.Secretary of Defense under President George W. Bush.
- Stephen H. Weiss, founder of Weiss, Peck & Greer began his career in investment banking at Becker from 1959 through 1970.
