= Promontory Financial Group =

Financial services consulting firm

- Company type: Wholly owned subsidiary of IBM
- Industry: Financial services
- Founded: 2001
- Headquarters: Washington, D.C., United States
- Number of locations: 15
- Area served: Worldwide
- Key people: Eugene Ludwig; Chairman and Founder Julie L. Williams; Global Head of Strategy Leslie Peeler; Chief Operating Officer
- Services: Management consulting, Asset management, Financial regulation
- Number of employees: circa 400
- Website: www.promontory.com

Promontory Financial Group, a wholly owned subsidiary of IBM (through their Consulting arm), is a global consulting firm that advises clients on a variety of financial services matters, including regulatory issues, compliance, risk management, liquidity, restructuring, acquisitions, due diligence, internal investigations and cyber security.

== Organization ==
The company was founded in 2001 by Eugene Ludwig, who served as Comptroller of the Currency under President Bill Clinton, and Alfred H. Moses, a partner in the law firm Covington & Burling LLP. Promontory is based in Washington, D.C. and has 18 additional offices and affiliates worldwide, in Atlanta, Beijing, Brussels, Denver, Dubai, Dublin, Hong Kong, Istanbul, London, Madrid, Milan, New York City, Paris, San Francisco, Singapore, Sydney, Tokyo, and Toronto.

IBM announced its planned acquisition of Promontory in September 2016 and completed the transaction in November 2016. Ludwig retired as CEO on February 28, 2021, passing the reins to an operating committee co-chaired by Julie L. Williams, Promontory's global head of strategy, and Leslie Peeler, chief operating officer.

Promontory Financial is affiliated with several similarly named companies:

- Promontory Forensics Solutions, LLC
- Promontory Growth and Innovation
- Promontory Human Capital Solutions
- Promontory Risk Review, LLC

== Employees ==
Approximately 170 of the consultants working for Promontory were former employees of authorities in financial supervision. The news media has sometimes referred to Promontory as a "shadow regulator" for Wall Street. The American Banker newspaper described Promontory under Ludwig's leadership as "a go-to for banks seeking insight on regulatory matters from a stable of former officials from the Office of the Comptroller of the Currency, Federal Deposit Insurance Corp., Federal Reserve, Securities and Exchange Commission and other agencies."

Former government officials currently associated with Promontory include:

- Sarah Bloom Raskin. Former United States Deputy Secretary of the Treasury, former member of the Federal Reserve Governor, and former Maryland Commissioner of Financial Regulation. Served as managing director of Promontory Financial Group, Washington. Currently a Promontory Advisory Board vice chair.
- Mary Schapiro. Former chair of the Securities and Exchange Commission and former chair of the Commodity Futures Trading Commission. Joined Promontory in April 2013 as managing director and chair of its governance and markets practice. Currently a Promontory Advisory Board vice chair.
- Julie L. Williams. Former first senior deputy comptroller and chief counsel and two-time former acting Comptroller of the Currency. Current co-chair of the firm's operating committee.
- Dr Jeffrey Carmichael. Former founding chair of the Australian Prudential Regulation Authority following 20 years with the Reserve Bank of Australia. Dr. Carmichael is Chief Executive Officer of Promontory Financial Group Australasia (PFGA).

Former government officials previously associated with Promontory include:

- Elizabeth McCaul. Former New York Superintendent of Banks. Former head of New York office of Promontory, global head of strategy, and interim chair of Promontory Financial Group Europe.
- David Nason. Former Assistant Secretary for Financial Institutions, U.S. Treasury. Served as managing director of Promontory Financial Group, Washington.
- Tommaso Padoa-Schioppa (1940-2010). Former Italian Minister of Economy and Finances and former chairman of the Basel Committee on Banking Supervision. Served as chairman of Promontory Financial Group Europe until his death.

== Engagements ==
After uncovering foreign exchange losses in its U.S. banking subsidiary, Allfirst Financial Inc., Allied Irish Bank in 2002 engaged Promontory to conduct an internal investigation. Promontory issued the "Ludwig Report", on March 14, 2002. The report detailed how the trader John Rusnak hid losses of $691 million over five years. The report concluded that Rusnak, who was fired for his role in the trading losses, received no active help from within or outside the bank. Promontory found that the internal control mechanisms and audits had been insufficient.

Promontory advised further the government of the United States and from other countries like Cameroon and Iceland.

Promontory was hired to carry out by order of the Holy See a comprehensive investigation of all customer contacts of the Institute for the Works of Religion (Italian: Istituto per le Opere di Religione – IOR), often also called the Vatican bank, on money laundering guided by former Promontory Europe executives Elizabeth McCaul and Raffaele Cosimo.

In the aftermath of the subprime mortgage crisis, Promontory was one of several consulting firms selected by federal banking regulators to conduct reviews of loan foreclosures initiated by 16 mortgage servicing companies. Promontory reviewed the foreclosure activities of Bank of America, PNC Financial Services and Wells Fargo, encompassing more than 250,000 loan contracts. Promontory was paid $927 million, which led to strong criticism and doubt about the independence of the examination. A hearing was arranged by the U.S. Senate Banking Committee to assess whether regulators had handed off too much oversight authority to private consulting firms such as Promontory.

Promontory was also engaged by Commonwealth Bank to oversee their Open Advice Review in 2014 and by Westpac to undertake an independent review into their breach of anti money laundering laws in 2019.

== New York State enforcement action ==
In August 2015, Promontory entered into an agreement with the New York Department of Financial Services to resolve the state's allegations that it had watered down compliance reports for a UK banking client, Standard Chartered Bank. Promontory agreed to pay a $15 million penalty and voluntarily abstained for six months from accepting new consulting engagements in New York.
