= Diana Taylor (superintendent) =

American business executive (born 1955)

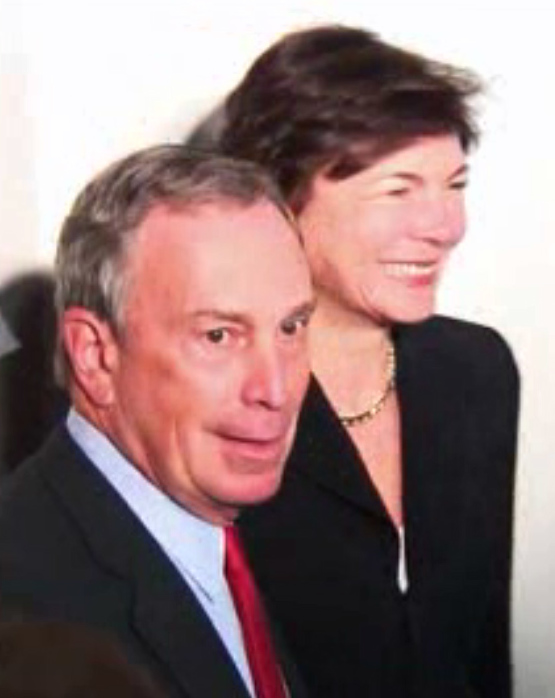
- Taylor and Michael Bloomberg in 2006

42nd New York Superintendent of Banks
- In office June 10, 2003 – March 5, 2007
- Governor: George Pataki; Eliot Spitzer
- Preceded by: Elizabeth McCaul
- Succeeded by: Richard H. Neiman

First Lady of New York City (de facto)
- In role January 1, 2002 – December 31, 2013
- Preceded by: Donna Hanover
- Succeeded by: Chirlane McCray

Personal details
- Born: Diana Lancaster Taylor; February 6, 1955 (age 71) Greenwich, Connecticut, U.S.
- Party: Democratic
- Spouse: Michael Bloomberg (m. 2026)
- Education: Dartmouth College (BA); Columbia University (MBA, MPH)

Diana Lancaster Taylor (born February 6, 1955) is an American business executive. She was the New York Superintendent of Banks from 2003 to 2007. Taylor was the First Lady of New York City from 2002 to 2013 through her domestic partnership with politician and businessman Michael Bloomberg.

== Early life ==
Taylor was born in Greenwich, Connecticut. Taylor stated in an article in The New York Times: "Growing up, I imagined I would come to New York, get married, move to the suburbs and have kids. It just didn’t happen that way."

== Education ==
Taylor attended Greenwich Country Day School, where her mother was a teacher, from first through ninth grade. She spent one year at Milton Academy before graduating from Greenwich High School. She earned an A.B. in economics from Dartmouth College, an MPH from Columbia University Mailman School of Public Health, and an MBA from Columbia Business School.

== Career ==
After graduating from Dartmouth, Taylor joined the New York City Department of Social Services. While in business school, she worked nights and weekends as an administrator at St. Vincent's Hospital in Brooklyn and in the public finance department at Smith Barney. She received an offer for a full-time job at Smith Barney upon graduation from Columbia. She subsequently worked for Lehman Brothers and Donaldson Lufkin & Jenrette.

In 1996, Taylor became assistant secretary to then Governor George Pataki. After briefly working for Keyspan Energy and serving as the chief financial officer of the Long Island Power Authority, she returned to the Pataki administration as deputy secretary.

In May 2003, she became New York State superintendent of banks.

In 2007, she become managing director at Wolfensohn Fund Management.

Taylor serves on the boards of ACCION International and the YMCA of Greater New York, as director of Citigroup and Brookfield Properties, and as vice chairman of Solera Capital.

In 2006, Taylor was also reportedly considered by the George W. Bush administration as a prospective nominee to serve as the Chairwoman and Chief Executive Officer of the Federal Deposit Insurance Corporation (FDIC), but was not appointed to the post. Taylor considered running as a Republican in the 2010 United States Senate special election in New York against Democratic Senator Kirsten Gillibrand, but ultimately decided not to run.

== Personal life ==
Taylor met Michael Bloomberg at a Citizens Budget Commission event in 2000, where they were seated together. Since then, the couple has been together and she acted as an unofficial first lady for the city during his mayorship, joining him at social functions and campaigning with him. She has been frequently seen marching with him in parades citywide. During the 2005 New York City transit strike, Taylor stayed with Bloomberg in the city's Office of Emergency Management headquarters in Brooklyn each night of the strike. Taylor campaigned with Bloomberg during the 2020 Democratic Party presidential primaries in California, Utah, Arkansas and Alabama. In 2026, the two married.

In her civic life, Taylor serves on non-profit and corporate boards that include Hot Bread Kitchen, the International Women's Health Coalition, The New York Women's Foundation, YMCA of Greater New York, ACCION, Columbia Mailman School of Public Health, Sotheby's, Citigroup, Brookfield Properties and her alma mater Dartmouth She changed her political party affiliation to the Democratic Party in 2018.

Civic offices
Preceded by Elizabeth McCaul	New York Superintendent of Banks; 2003–2007	Succeeded by Richard Neiman
Honorary titles
Preceded by Donna Hanover	First Lady of New York City; 2002–2013	Succeeded by Chirlane McCray
