= Eugene Ludwig =

American businessman (born 1946)

Gene Ludwig
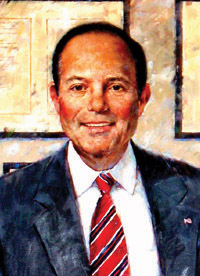

27th Comptroller of the Currency
- In office April 5, 1993 - April 3, 1998
- President: Bill Clinton
- Preceded by: Robert L. Clarke
- Succeeded by: John D. Hawke Jr.

Personal details
- Born: April 11, 1946 (age 79); New York City, New York, U.S.
- Spouse: Carol Ludwig
- Children: 3
- Education: Haverford College (BA); New College, Oxford (MA); Yale University (JD)

Eugene A. "Gene" Ludwig (born April 11, 1946) is an American businessperson who is chairman of the consulting firm Promontory Financial Group. From 1993 to 1998 he was Comptroller of the Currency.

== Early life ==
Ludwig was born in Brooklyn, New York, to Jacob S. and Louise Rabiner Ludwig and raised in York, Pennsylvania. His father was a doctor and his mother was a former Broadway chorus girl.

Ludwig received a bachelor's degree from Haverford College in 1968. He studied philosophy at Oxford University. He graduated with a master's of arts degree from New College in politics and economics. He graduated from Yale Law School with a JD degree. At Yale Law School, he was an editor of the Yale Law Journal and president of Yale Legislative Services.

== Legal career ==
In 1973, Ludwig was hired by the law firm Covington and Burling, becoming a partner in 1981.

== Comptroller of the Currency ==
In 1993, Ludwig became the 27th Comptroller of the Currency. Ludwig took office after the early 1990s recession had caused bank failures and created a credit crunch. During his tenure, the Office of the Comptroller of the Currency took the lead in regulators’ 1993 initiatives to alleviate a lingering credit crunch by encouraging banks to increase lending. As Comptroller, Ludwig was a member of the Basel Committee on Bank Supervision, a director of the Federal Deposit Insurance Corporation, and a director of the Neighborhood Reinvestment Corporation.

Ludwig led President Clinton's initiatives to reform the Community Reinvestment Act and more vigorously enforce the fair lending laws. In December 1993, Ludwig was singled out by then-Secretary of the Treasury Robert Rubin, who praised “his efforts to make CRA reform a reality."

== Business career ==
Ludwig was vice chairman of Bankers Trust/Deutsche Bank from April 1998 to December 31, 1999.

In 2001, Ludwig founded Promontory Financial Group, becoming its CEO and chairman. The firm gained attention when, following a $750 million trading scandal at Allied Irish Banks, Promontory produced what became known as "The Ludwig Report," recommending improved compliance and management measures which helped the bank regain its footing. In 2007, after Ludwig advised Countrywide Financial, Portfolio.com wrote that "[Countrywide CEO] Angelo Mozilo is a tough character, and Ludwig is one of the few people with enough clout to persuade him that the game really was up."

Ludwig is also co-founder and managing partner of Canapi Ventures, a venture capital firm, and founder and CEO of Ludwig Advisors. Promontory Interfinancial Network, a separate company that Ludwig started in 2003 with former Federal Reserve Vice Chairman Alan Blinder, was sold in 2019 to Blackstone Group. Since 2021, Ludwig has sat on the Advisory Board of Suade Labs.

== Publications ==
Ludwig is the editor of The Vanishing American Dream, a book that provides comments from experts across the political spectrum on the economic challenges facing lower- and middle-income Americans. The book was the outcome of a 2019 Yale Law School symposium organized by Ludwig. The book examines how traditional economic measures like the unemployment rate and GDP are masking a crisis for millions of lower- and middle-income families, who struggle to afford health care, housing, and education and occupy jobs that cannot help them reverse the downward slide. Kirkus Reviews gave the book a positive review.”

Ludwig has written numerous articles on banking, finance, and economic policy for scholarly journals and publications and has been a guest lecturer at Yale and Harvard law schools and Georgetown University's International Law Institute. Ludwig's works center on the economic challenges confronting lower- and middle-income Americans. He has noted that real-wage stagnation and increases in the costs of education, housing, health care and food, have created a situation where middle-income households were spending 78% of their budgets on basic needs in 2014.

In 2008, Ludwig co-authored an essay in The Wall Street Journal with former Federal Reserve Chairman Paul A. Volcker and former U.S. Treasury Secretary Nicholas F. Brady calling for a resurrection of the Resolution Trust Corporation to help deal with the financial crisis.

== Personal life ==
Ludwig lives in Washington, D.C. He is married to Dr. Carol Ludwig, and they have three children. His younger brother Ken Ludwig is a playwright.

He is a Wykeham Fellow at New College, Oxford. Ludwig has endowed several funds and programs, including the Ludwig Fund for the Humanities at New College, Oxford; the Eugene and Carol Ludwig Center for Community & Economic Development at Yale Law School; and the Ludwig Fund for Community Development at Haverford College.

Ludwig has received awards, including the BritishAmerican Business Entrepreneurship Award (2010), National Academy Foundation Leadership Award (2011), Simeon E. Baldwin Award, presented by the Yale Law School Center for the Study of Corporate Law (2011), the Foreign Policy Association Medal (2014), and the Jill Chaifetz Award presented by Advocates for Children (2014.)

Government offices
Preceded by Robert L. Clarke	Comptroller of the Currency; 1993–1998	Succeeded by John D. Hawke, Jr.
