= George Pataki =

Governor of New York from 1995 to 2006

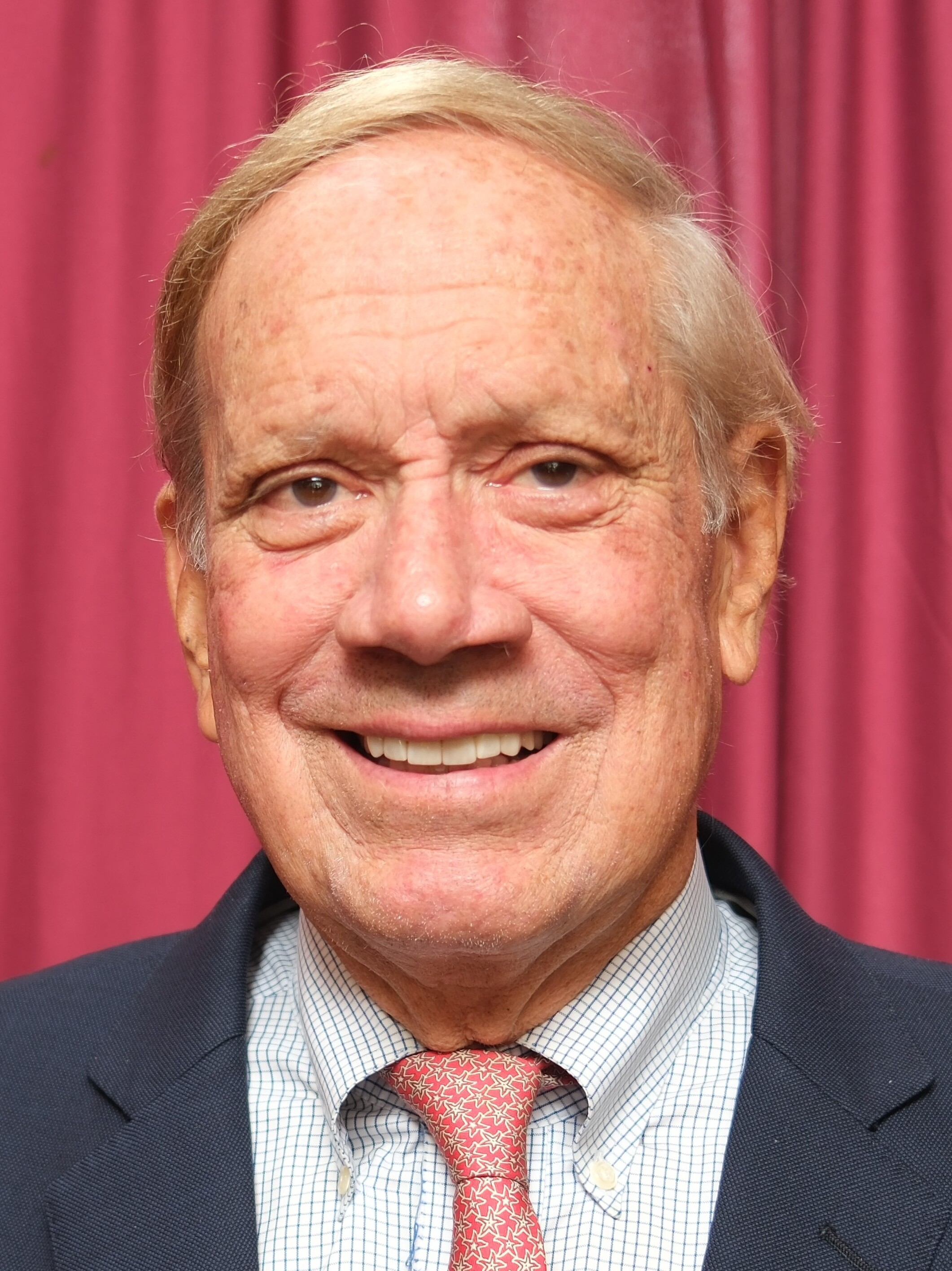
- Pataki in 2026

53rd Governor of New York
- In office January 1, 1995 – December 31, 2006
- Lieutenant: Betsy McCaughey; Mary Donohue
- Preceded by: Mario Cuomo
- Succeeded by: Eliot Spitzer

Member of the New York State Senate from the 37th district
- In office January 1, 1993 – December 31, 1994
- Preceded by: Mary B. Goodhue
- Succeeded by: Vincent Leibell

Member of the New York State Assembly from the 91st district
- In office January 1, 1985 – December 31, 1992
- Preceded by: William Ryan
- Succeeded by: Vincent Leibell

Mayor of Peekskill
- In office January 1, 1981 – December 31, 1984
- Preceded by: Fred Bianco
- Succeeded by: Richard E. Jackson

Personal details
- Born: George Elmer Pataki; June 24, 1945 (age 81) Peekskill, New York, U.S.
- Party: Republican
- Spouse: Libby Rowland (m. 1973)
- Children: 4, including Allison
- Education: Yale University (BA); Columbia University (JD)
- Website: Official website

George Elmer Pataki (/pəˈtɑːki/; born June 24, 1945) is an American politician who served as the 53rd governor of New York from 1995 to 2006. He previously served in the State Legislature from 1985 to 1994, and as mayor of Peekskill from 1981 to 1984. Pataki was the third elected Republican governor of New York since 1923, after Thomas E. Dewey and Nelson Rockefeller, and is currently the most recent one.

Pataki's most notable achievements as governor included the creation of a number of new health care programs, presiding over recovery efforts following the September 11 attacks, and for increasing the state's credit rating three times. He chose not to run for a fourth term in 2006, being succeeded by Democrat Eliot Spitzer. Pataki and Mary Donohue (his second lieutenant governor) are the last Republicans elected to statewide office in New York, although Republicans Joseph Bruno and Dean Skelos each briefly served as acting lieutenant governor in 2008.

Pataki announced his candidacy for the Republican Party presidential nomination on May 28, 2015. He withdrew from the race shortly before the primaries began on December 29, 2015.

== Early life and education ==
Pataki was born on June 24, 1945, in Peekskill, New York. Pataki's paternal grandfather was Pataki János (known in the U.S. as John Pataki, 1883–1971) of Aranyosapáti, Kingdom of Hungary. The family name's Hungarian pronunciation is ['pɒtɒki] and means "from the creek (little river)." János came to the United States in 1908, worked in a hat factory and had married Erzsébet (later Elizabeth; 1887–1975), also Hungarian-born, around 1904. Their son, Pataki's father, was Louis P. Pataki (1912–1996), a mailman and volunteer fire chief, who ran the Pataki Farm. Pataki's maternal grandfather was Matteo Laganà (born in Calabria, Italy in 1889), who married Agnes Lynch of County Louth, Ireland around 1914. Their daughter, Margaret Lagana (1915–2017), was Pataki's mother. Pataki has an older brother, Louis. Pataki speaks some Hungarian as well as Spanish, French, and German.

After graduating from Peekskill High School, Pataki entered Yale University in 1963 on an academic scholarship and graduated in 1967 with a history major. While there, Pataki was Chairman of the Conservative Party of the Yale Political Union, where he participated in debates, and a member of the conservative Calliopean Society. He received his J.D. from Columbia Law School in 1970.

== Early political career ==
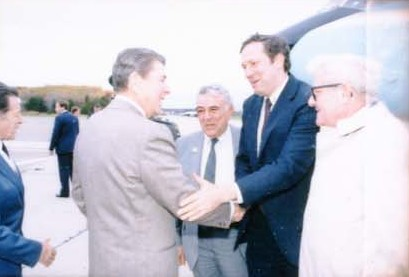
Pataki greeting President Ronald Reagan in 1987

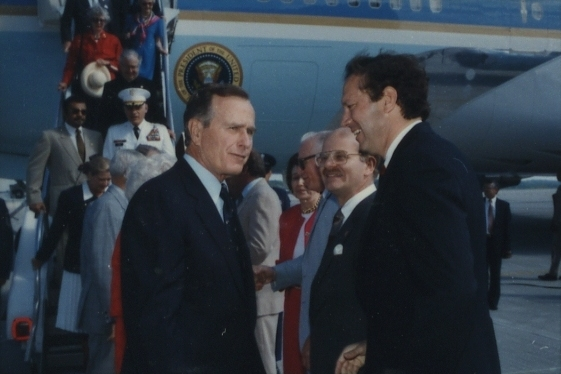
Pataki greeting President George H. W. Bush in 1991

While practicing law at Plunkett and Jaffe, P.C. in Peekskill, Pataki became friends with Michael C. Finnegan, who would go on to be the architect of Pataki's ascendancy to power. Finnegan would go on to manage Pataki's campaigns for Mayor, State Assembly, State Senate, and the governorship. Finnegan was then appointed chief counsel to the governor in 1995, and played the key role in developing and negotiating nearly all of Pataki's early legislative success.

=== Mayor of Peekskill ===
Pataki first won elected office in November 1981. He was elected mayor of the city of Peekskill, which is located in the northwestern part of Westchester County. Pataki defeated Democratic incumbent Fred Bianco Jr., winning 70% of the vote. In November 1983, he was re-elected mayor, winning 74% of the vote.

=== New York State Assembly ===
In November 1984, Pataki was elected to the New York State Assembly (91st District), by defeating one-term Democratic incumbent William J. Ryan, winning 53% of the vote. In November 1986, Pataki defeated Ryan in a rematch, capturing 63% of the vote. Pataki won a third term in November 1988, winning 74% of the vote against Democratic candidate Mark Zinna. Pataki won a fourth and final term in November 1990, winning over 90% of the vote, as he only faced a minor party candidate. He was an assemblyman in the 186th, 187th, 188th and 189th New York State Legislatures.

=== New York State Senate ===
From 1983 to 1992, the 91st Assembly district included parts of Westchester, Orange, Rockland, and Putnam Counties. However, in 1992, Assembly Democrats substantially redrew the district boundaries, placing the newly renamed 90th Assembly district entirely within Westchester County. Instead of running in the newly redrawn district, Pataki decided to challenge seven-term incumbent Republican State Senator Mary B. Goodhue in a Republican primary in Senate District 37 by criticizing her for taking her grandchildren to Disney World and missing a vote in Albany. Pataki won the primary by a 52% to 48% margin. However, Goodhue still planned to appear on the November ballot on a minor party line. In November 1992, Pataki won the general election. He served in the Senate during the 190th New York State Legislature and ran for governor at the next election.

== Gubernatorial campaigns ==
=== 1994 campaign ===
Pataki was a first-term state senator from Westchester County when he launched his bid for the Republican nomination for governor in 1994. He said he launched the campaign because of his frustration in the Senate regarding how Albany worked and on tax issues. Pataki's campaign received a boost when he was endorsed by U.S. Sen. Al D'Amato. He received the party's endorsement at the spring state convention and easily defeated former State Republican Chairman Richard Rosenbaum in the September primary. Pataki was considered an underdog from the start since he was running against three-term Gov. Mario Cuomo and because Pataki had little name recognition statewide. D'Amato reportedly backed Pataki because of a poll that showed a pro-choice, fiscal conservative from the New York City suburbs could win statewide for governor. The poll also showed a female running mate for lieutenant governor would help the ticket. Academic Betsy McCaughey was chosen as Pataki's running mate.

The polls had Governor Cuomo ahead by as many as ten points going into the final two weeks, but they narrowed at the end. Pataki made an issue of Cuomo seeking a fourth term as governor and pledged to serve only two terms in office. Cuomo was helped late in the race by the endorsement of New York City Mayor Rudy Giuliani. Pataki narrowly defeated Cuomo in the general election. Many, including Pataki himself, believed Howard Stern's endorsement of Pataki was a major reason for his win. He finished with 48.8% of the vote to Cuomo's 45.5%, and independence candidate Tom Golisano finished with 4.2%.

Pataki made up for a soft performance in New York City by running up a decisive margin outside of it, especially among upstaters disenchanted with Cuomo. Pataki won all but one county outside the Five Boroughs. Pataki became New York's first elected Republican governor since Nelson Rockefeller.

=== 1998 campaign ===
Pataki was considered the front-runner from the start of the 1998 campaign for governor. He was unopposed for the Republican nomination and paired with a new running mate, Judge Mary Donohue. The Democrats faced a primary battle between New York City Council Speaker Peter Vallone, Lt. Gov. Betsy McCaughey Ross, who had switched parties, and former Transportation Commissioner James LaRocca. Vallone captured the Democratic nomination, with Thomas Golisano running as the Independence nominee and McCaughey Ross as the Liberal Party nominee. Pataki was easily reelected to a second term in office. He finished with 54.3% of the vote, his highest percentage finish in a gubernatorial race, to Vallone's 33.2% and Golisano's 7.7%.

=== 2002 campaign ===
Pataki was considered a strong contender for a third term, despite having pledged in 1994 to serve only two terms. He ran again on a ticket with Lt. Gov. Mary Donohue and the Democrats faced a primary battle between State Comptroller Carl McCall and former HUD Secretary Andrew Cuomo, Mario Cuomo's son. Pataki emphasized his previous work and the need to have continuity following Sept. 11.

McCall essentially secured the Democratic nomination when Andrew Cuomo stumbled (and ultimately withdrew before the primary at the urging of his mentor Bill Clinton); Cuomo was quoted in the media as saying, regarding Pataki's performance post-9/11:

Pataki stood behind the leader. He held the leader's coat. He was a great assistant to the leader. But he was not a leader. Cream rises to the top, and Rudy Giuliani rose to the top.

Pataki sought the nomination of the Independence Party of New York in his bid for a third term as well. He faced the party's founder and 1994 and 1998 nominee, Thomas Golisano, in his bid for the nomination. Pataki ran an active primary campaign and lost to Golisano. Donohue did win the primary for lieutenant governor and was the running mate of both Pataki and Golisano in the general election.

In the general election, Pataki defeated McCall and Golisano easily. As in 1998 due to Golisano's presence on the ballot, Pataki did not win a majority, instead winning a plurality. Pataki won 49.4% of the vote, and McCall only mustered 33.5% with wins in four of the five New York City boroughs. Golisano finished with the highest vote total of his political career, and the highest vote total for any candidate of the Independence Party of New York in any statewide election.

This was the last time a Republican was elected Governor of New York, and the last time a Republican has cracked over 41% in a gubernatorial election until the 2022 election in which Republican candidate Congressman Lee Zeldin amassed 47% of the vote against incumbent Democrat Kathy Hochul.

=== Retirement from the governorship ===
By the summer of 2005, opinion polls indicated that Pataki would face an uphill battle if he sought a fourth term in 2006. Accordingly, he announced on July 27, 2005, that he would not do so, saying that New York was "a better state than it was 10 years ago" and that he was retiring so he could "follow a new path, find new challenges." He was succeeded by Democrat Eliot Spitzer.

== Governorship and political positions ==
The Pataki Executive Chamber
Office	Name	Term
Governor	George Pataki	1995–2007
Lieutenant Governor	Betsy McCaughey	1995–1999
Mary Donohue	1999–2007
Secretary to the Governor	Bradford J. Race Jr.	1995–2002
John P. Cahill	2002–2007
General Counsel	Michael C. Finnegan	1995–1997
James McGuire	1997–2003
Richard Platkin	2003–2007
Communications Director	Zenia Mucha	1995–2000
Michael McKeon	2000–2002
Lisa Dewald Stoll	2003–2005
David Catalfamo	2005–2007
Office of the Attorney General	Dennis Vacco	1995–1999
Eliot Spitzer	1999–2007
Office of the Inspector General	Roslynn R. Mauskopf	1995–2002
Jill Konviser-Levine	2002–2005
Dineen Riviezzo	2005–2007
Office of the Comptroller	H. Carl McCall	1995–2003
Alan Hevesi	2003–2007
Department of Agriculture and Markets	Donald R. Davidsen	1995–1999
Nathan L. Rudgers	1995–2005
Patrick Brennan	2005–2007
Department of Banking	Neil Levin	1995–1997
Elizabeth McCaul	1997–2003
Diana Taylor	2003–2007
Department of Civil Service	George C. Sinnott	1995–2004
Daniel E. Wall	2004–2007
Department of Corrections and Community Supervision	Glenn S. Goord	1995–2007
Department of Environmental Conservation	Michael D. Zagata	1995–1997
John P. Cahill	1997–2001
Erin Crotty	2001–2005
Denise Sheehan	2005–2007
Education Department	Richard P. Mills	1995–2007
Department of Health	Barbara DeBuono	1995–1998
Antonia Novello	1998–2007
Insurance Department	Edward Muhl	1995–1997
Neil Levin	1997–2001
Gregory V. Serio	2001–2005
Howard Mills III	2005–2007
Department of Labor	John E. Sweeney	1995–1997
James J. McGowan	1997–2000
Linda Angello	2001–2007
Department of Motor Vehicles	Richard E. Jackson	1995–2000
Raymond P. Martinez	2000–2006
Nancy Naples	2006–2007
Department of Military & Naval Affairs	Michael S. Hall	1995–1997
John H. Fenimore V	1997–2001
Thomas P. Maguire	2001–2006
Joseph J. Taluto	2006–2007
Department of Public Service	John F. O'Mara	1995–1998
Maureen Helmer	1998–2002
William Flynn	2002–2006
Patricia Acompora	2006–2008
Secretary of State	Alexander Treadwell	1995–2001
Randy Daniels	2001–2006
Christopher Jacobs	2006–2007
Department of Taxation and Finance	Michael H. Urbach	1995–1999
Arthur J. Roth	1999–2003
Andrew Eristoff	2003–2006
Department of Transportation	John B. Daly	1995–1997
Joseph H. Boardman	1997–2005
Thomas J. Madison Jr.	2005–2007

As Governor of New York, Pataki was known as a moderate to liberal Republican who cut taxes and was tough on crime, but who also supported gun control, environmental protection, gay rights, and abortion rights.

=== Fiscal policy ===
==== Taxes, spending, budget power, and economic growth ====
Under the Pataki Administration, New York's credit rating was increased three times by Moody's Investors Service, a fact that he highlighted often before his critics. During his three terms in office, he introduced and approved more tax cuts than any of his predecessors. Following through on a campaign promise, Pataki led a push to cut both the individual and the corporate tax rates in New York. The state's infamously high income tax rates dropped by 20% on average, but an economic downturn following the attacks of September 11 and increasing state spending caused Sheldon Silver and Joseph Bruno to coordinate an effort to roll back a number of these cuts in 2003 over Pataki's veto power.

The STAR and STAR-Plus programs were also introduced during Pataki's governorship. The STAR program introduced tax relief for New York's homeowners and landowners on their school taxes. The STAR-Plus program was later introduced when relief was diminished by increasing school taxes, increasing spending and State Aid. In his third term Pataki challenged the Speaker of the Assembly, resulting in two Court of Appeals decisions sustaining the powers of the governor to formulate a statewide budget.

==== Casinos ====
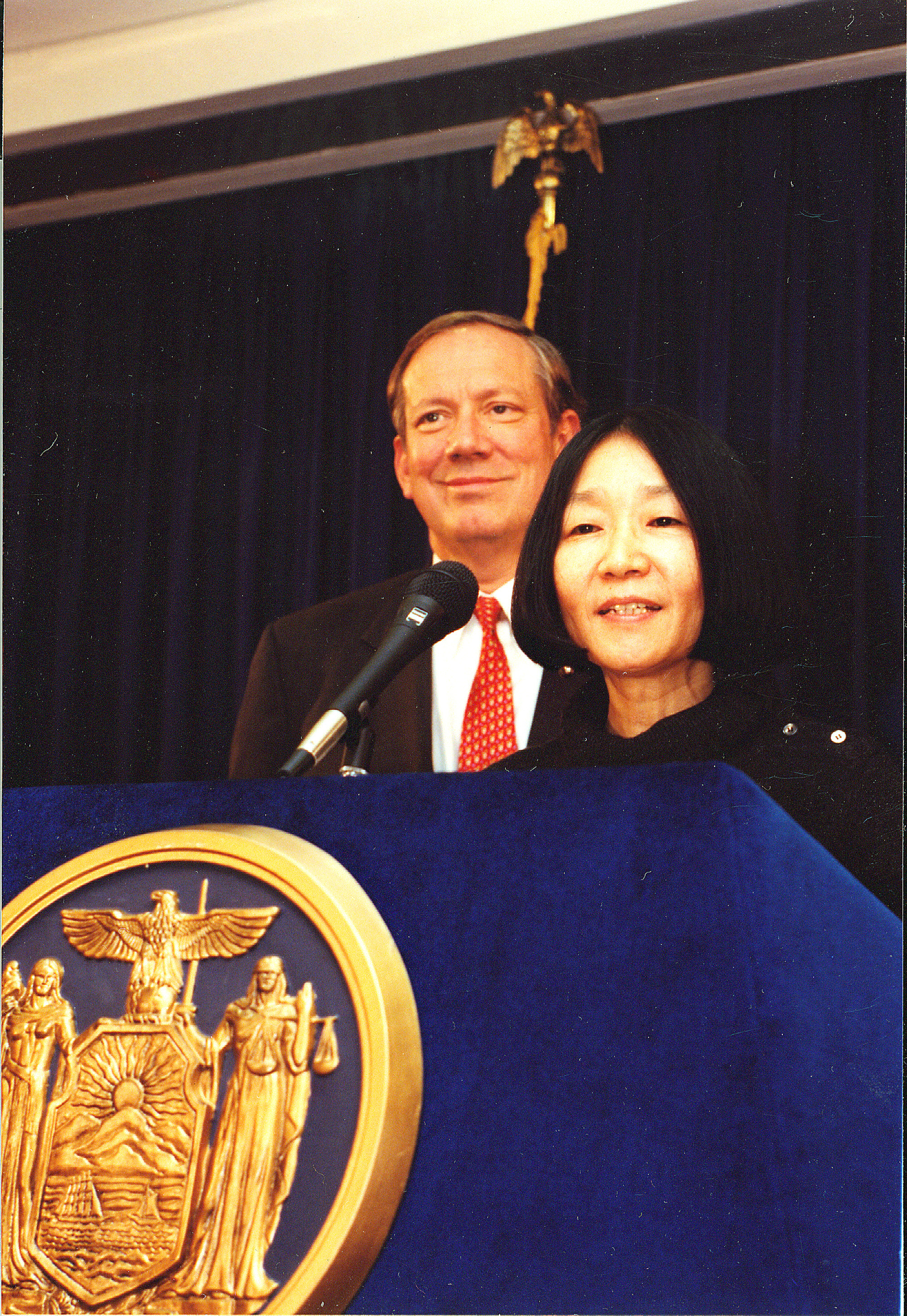
Pataki and philanthropist Yuko Nii

Pataki advocated for Native American casinos in upstate New York. As a part of the creation of the Seneca Niagara Casino in Niagara Falls, an agreement was reached to give a percentage of the slot machine revenue to the City of Niagara Falls each year to spend on local tourism projects and projects relating to hosting the casino.

=== Social policy ===
==== Abortion ====
Pataki describes himself as pro-choice. In 1999, he called upon the Republican Party to soften its platform language regarding opposition to abortion rights.

==== Gay rights ====
Pataki lobbied heavily in favor of the Sexual Orientation Non-Discrimination Act, a gay rights bill that had languished in the state Senate for many years due to the opposition of Senate Leader Joseph Bruno. In late 2002, Bruno finally gave in; the bill passed the Senate and was signed into law by Pataki. He opposed same-sex marriage as governor.

==== Crime ====
Polls showed that the majority of New Yorkers wanted the state's death penalty laws restored. Prior to Pataki's tenure, a bill to restore the death penalty had passed the Legislature for several years in a row only to be vetoed by Mario Cuomo. Pataki made the issue a top priority of his, and when the bill reached his desk in 1995, he signed it into law. The New York Court of Appeals later ruled the death penalty law unconstitutional in a 4–3 decision in People v. LaValle (2004).

Being tough on crime was a major plank of Pataki's campaign for governor. In 2011, the administration touted statistics that illustrated that crime had steadily reduced during the 12 years Pataki had been governor, bringing New York from the 6th most dangerous state in the nation to the 7th safest. During his time in office, he signed into law over 100 new bills to change New York's criminal statutes. In 2000, Pataki helped lead the legislature in passing some of the then-strictest gun control laws in the country. Numerous aspects of the bill had been put forward by members of the Democratic-controlled Assembly but had never made it through the Republican held Senate. With numerous mass shootings in recent public memory, he urged a number of Republican Senators to support the bill, eventually passing it in a bipartisan effort. His administration also launched programs such as SAF-T (Statewide Anti-Fugitive Teams) and the 100 Most Wanted. The initiatives were aimed at disseminating descriptions of criminals who were evading law enforcement officials to promote the ability of average citizens to help aid in their capture. Versions of Megan's Law and Kendra's Law were integrated into New York's laws under the governor as well as a number of reforms to the Rockefeller Drug Laws. The changes to the Rockefeller laws were largely focused on inmates' ability to appeal for an early release from sentences that were passed on them under mandatory minimum sentencing statutes.

==== Health care ====
Under the Pataki Administration a number of new health care programs were created focusing on expanding care to the state's poorest citizens. In 1999, Governor Pataki signed into law comprehensive health care legislation that provided health insurance coverage, under Family Health Plus, to lower income adults who do not have health insurance through their employers. Child Health plus greatly expanded coverage for poorer families with children under 19 who did not qualify for Medicaid. By 2001, 530,000 children had been enrolled in the program. Family Health Plus would expand insurance coverage even further, offering free insurance to families and single adults who had too much income to be covered by Medicaid but could not afford insurance. Pataki also increased the affordability and availability of medication for seniors under New York's EPIC program by lowering fees and expanding eligibility. New York's 2003 ban on smoking in public places was passed and signed into law under the Pataki administration in the hopes that it would promote better health in New York and reduce health care cost over time. Assessing his twelve years in office, The New York Times ran an editorial praising his work on health care.

==== Environment ====
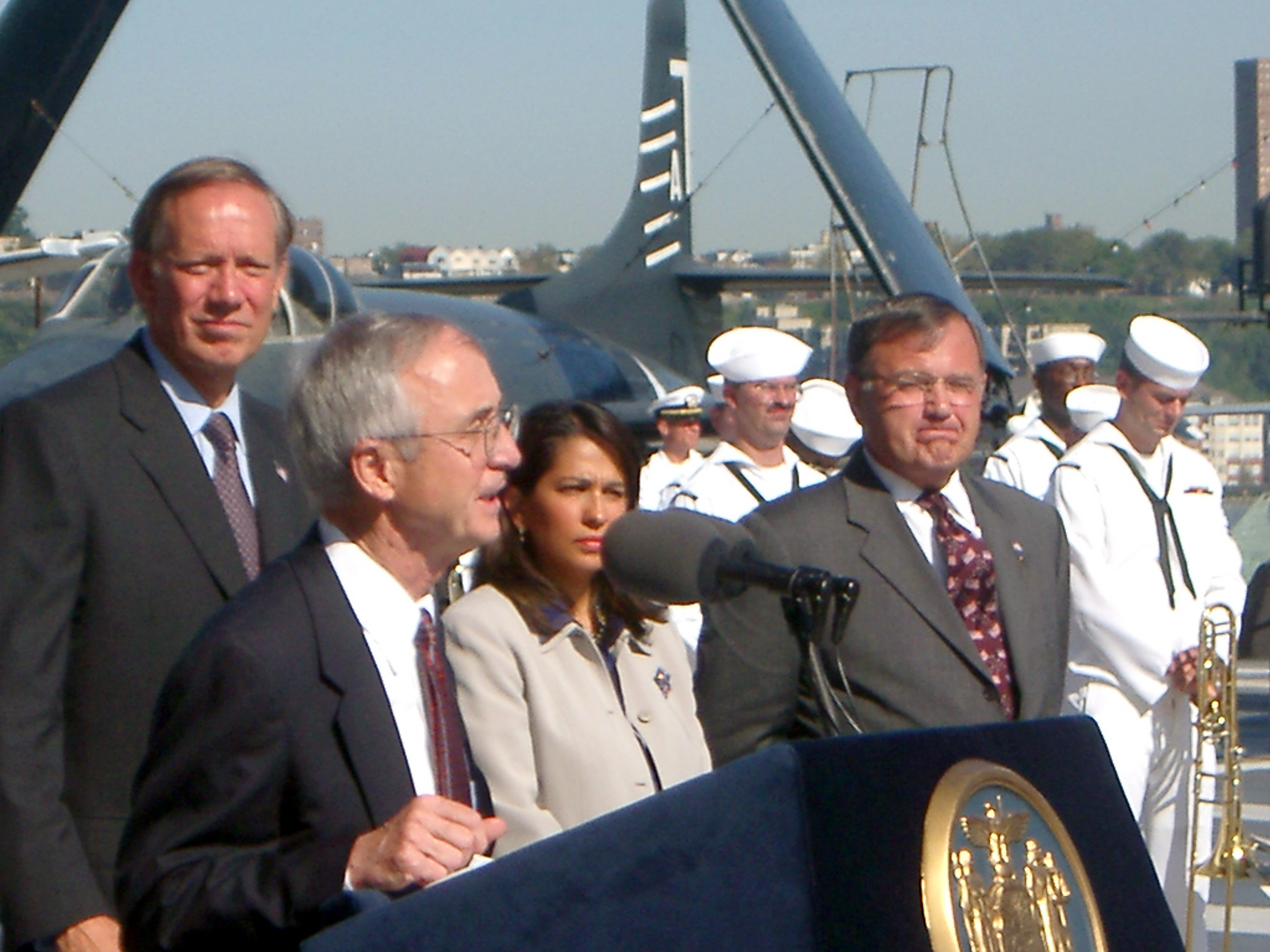
George Pataki at the USS New York, September 7, 2002 (back row, left)

In 2005, BusinessWeek placed George Pataki among the 20 individuals it commended for their personal efforts to combat global warming, citing his Greenhouse Gas Task Force and efforts to increase New York's usage of renewable energies. In 1996, Pataki oversaw the creation and passage of the Clean Water/Clean Air Environmental Bond Act. The act put forth $1.75 billion for over 2,200 environmentally minded projects throughout the state. Projects were focused on improving drinking water quality, closing landfills, investing in recycling programs, cleaning up New York's polluted waterways, funding cleanup of Brownfields and clean-air projects. During his tenure, Pataki added over one million acres to the entirety of the protected open spaces of New York. He also worked to protect the drinking water of millions of New Yorkers through the Catskill Watershed Agreement. Through the agreement, the numerous small communities that surround the 19 reservoirs that provide drinking water for New York City received $1 billion in aid to assuage environmental issues and promote local development in return for accepting higher standards of environmental regulations to better protect the reservoirs. On Pataki's final day in office, The New York Times ran an editorial evaluating his twelve years as governor and praised his work on the environment.

==== Education ====
Pataki heeded mounting desire to allow New York to join numerous other states in the growing movement for charter schools. In 1998, Pataki prevailed upon the Legislature to pass a charter school law by threatening to veto a legislative pay raise if the bill was not passed. Over the course of his terms in office, Pataki would expand the availability of charter schools in New York City and raise the state's cap on charter schools to 250.

In coordination with Mayor Rudy Giuliani, Pataki pushed to begin disassembling the reputation of City University of New York system as a group of remedial schools. Starting in 1999, CUNY colleges would be required to drop their remedial courses over a 3-year period and restrict students who could not pass entry exams in an effort to deliver a higher quality college education through the city colleges. Pataki also put forth legislation that would lend mayors in New York's five largest cities greater control over their education systems. Through negotiations this authority was only awarded to the mayor of New York City as an attempt to overcome a system of school boards that many considered to be hampering efforts at reform.

==== Political reform ====
Looking over his tenure, The New York Times ran an editorial that criticized Pataki for the lack of tangible political reform and the consolidation of power under his watch.

=== September 11 terrorist attacks and aftermath ===
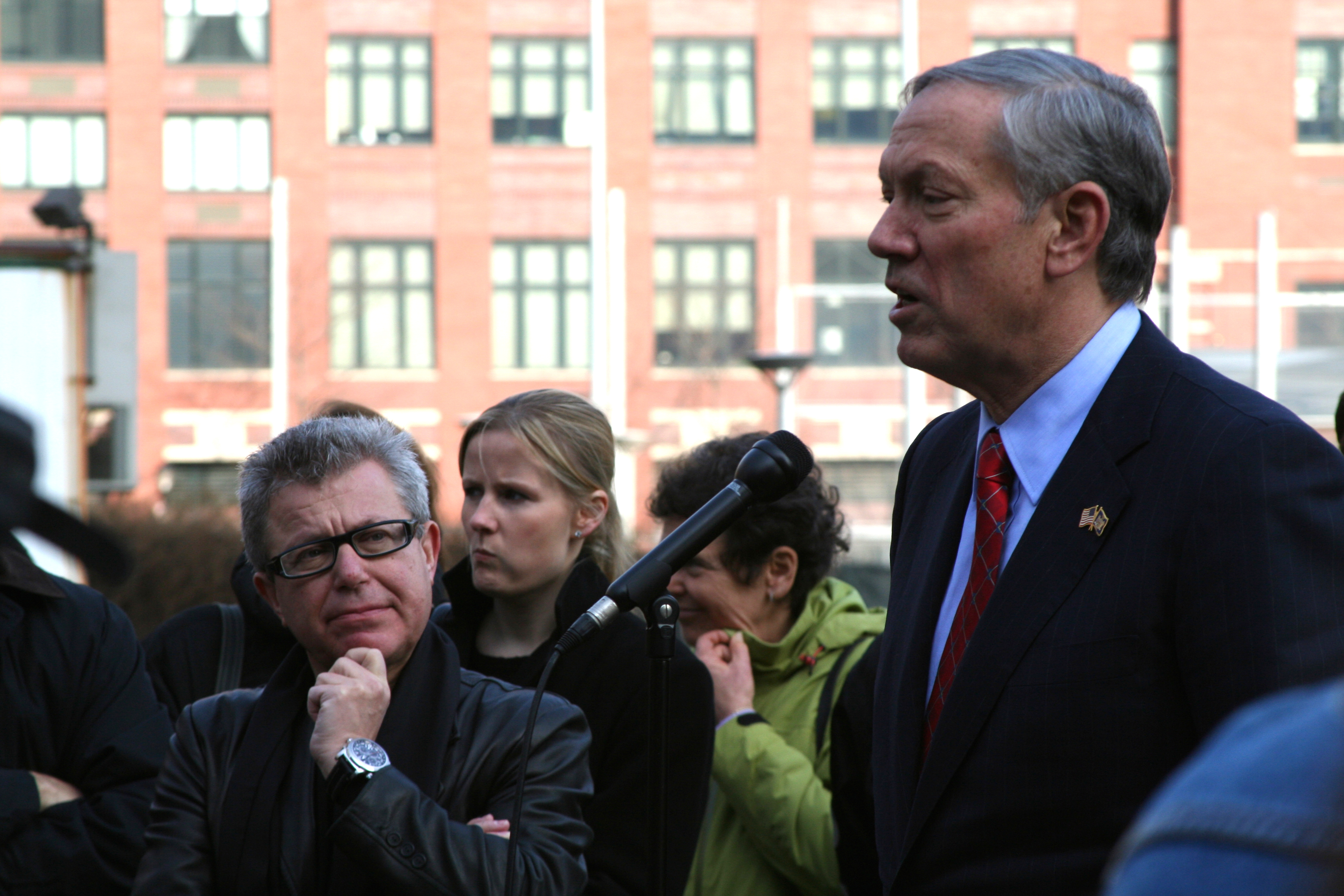
Pataki at the Freedom Tower foundation, speaking to family members of 9/11 victims

Pataki's New York City office had moved out of the World Trade Center in the months before the September 11, 2001, attacks, as the governor had pushed for privatization of the building.

Following 9/11, Pataki and New York City Mayor Rudy Giuliani appointed the LMDC to distribute nearly $10 billion in federal grants and to oversee the construction of a memorial. A symbolic cornerstone for the Freedom Tower with Pataki's name was laid on July 4, 2004, and after numerous design changes, construction commenced in May 2006. The memorial was completed in 2011.

=== Lieutenant governors ===
==== Betsy McCaughey Ross ====
Pataki's 1994 running mate for lieutenant governor was Betsy McCaughey, an academic best known for her critique of the Clinton health care plan. McCaughey was selected because of her work on the Clinton health care plan. Pataki choose McCaughey over sofa bed heiress Bernadette Castro; Castro was nominated for the U.S. Senate in 1994.

In April 1997, Pataki announced that he was dropping McCaughey from his 1998 reelection ticket. McCaughey became a Democrat and unsuccessfully sought the governorship in that party's 1998 primary. She was on the 1998 general election ballot as the nominee of the Liberal Party for governor.

==== Mary Donohue ====
After dropping McCaughey Ross from his 1998 ticket, Pataki considered several replacement running mates. In the spring of 1998, he announced his choice of State Supreme Court Justice Mary Donohue for lieutenant governor. In December 2006, Pataki appointed Donohue to be a Judge of the New York Court of Claims.

== Political involvement during gubernatorial tenure ==
=== 2000 presidential election ===
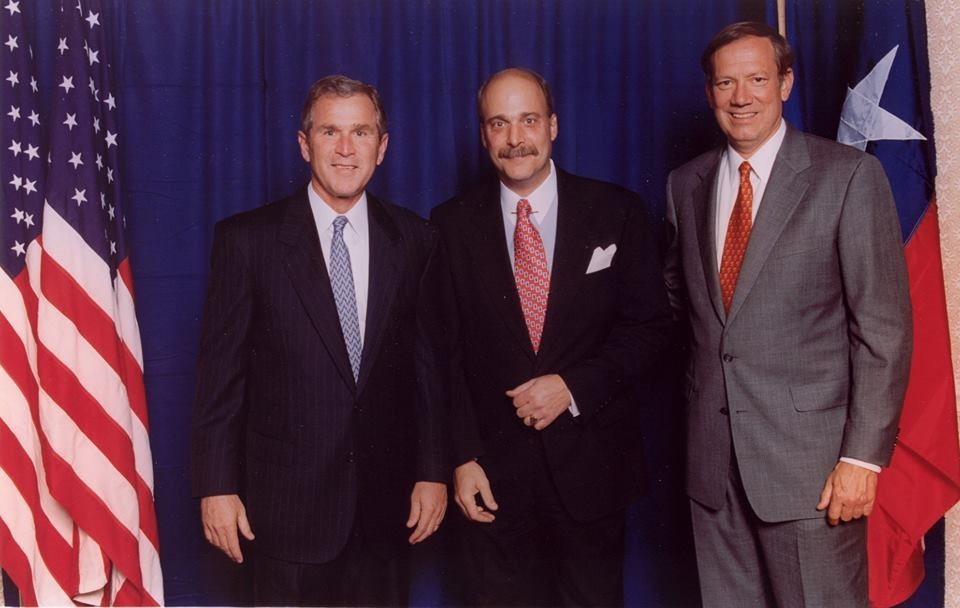
Pataki with President George W. Bush and Lloyd Stamy

In July 2000, Pataki's name surfaced on the short list to be the running mate for Republican presidential nominee George W. Bush, along with the names of Governor John Engler of Michigan, Governor Tom Ridge of Pennsylvania, former Senator John Danforth of Missouri, and former U.S. Labor Secretary Elizabeth Dole of North Carolina. Bush eventually selected the man who was in charge of scouting vice presidential candidates, former Secretary of Defense Dick Cheney. Pataki had strongly campaigned for Bush, making an unsuccessful effort to keep John McCain off the New York primary ballot (which Bush ultimately won).

=== 2004 Republican U.S. Senate primary ===
Pataki and New York GOP Chairman Sandy Treadwell faced controversy after naming moderate Assemblyman Howard Mills the party's nominee for the U.S. Senate against Senator Chuck Schumer over conservative Michael Benjamin, who held significant advantages in both fundraising and organization. Benjamin publicly accused Treadwell and Pataki of trying to muscle him out of the Senate race and undermine the democratic process. Mills went on to lose the election in the largest landslide for a Senate seat in the history of New York.

=== 2004 presidential election ===
Pataki was instrumental in bringing the 2004 Republican National Convention to Madison Square Garden in Manhattan. New York City, which normally votes overwhelmingly Democratic (the Democratic presidential nominees carried 78 percent of the city vote in both 2000 and 2004), had never hosted a Republican Convention. He introduced President George W. Bush. A year prior, Pataki had boasted Bush would carry the state in the 2004 elections; Bush lost New York 58% to 40% to John Kerry. Pataki notably orated, referencing the recently deceased Ronald Reagan, "This fall, we're going to win one for the Gipper. But our opponents, they're going to lose one with the Flipper."

== Post-governorship ==
After leaving the governorship, Pataki joined the law firm Chadbourne & Parke in New York joining their renewable energy practice. He continued to flirt with a possible bid for president. After ruling out a presidential campaign, Pataki retained his political action committee, which he could legally use to further his own views and other political interests. In addition, Pataki has formed an environmental consulting firm with his former chief of staff John Cahill, the Pataki-Cahill Group.

Pataki holds an amateur radio license.

=== Governor George E. Pataki Leadership and Learning Center ===
The Governor George E. Pataki Leadership and Learning Center, located in Peekskill, New York, is designed to educate schoolchildren on government using Governor Pataki's public service as an example. Charles A. Gargano, Pataki's former economic development chief, led the effort to create the center. On August 14, 2008, the New York Times announced that the center's sponsors had "filed paperwork with the State Department of Education and are trying to raise $500,000 for a start-up fund so they can open the center in the fall." The center held Governor Pataki's official portrait, which was moved to Albany at the end of 2009. As of 2008, the center had three directors: David Catalfamo, the governor's former communications chief; Kimberly Cappelleri, Libby Pataki's former chief of staff; and, Amy Holden, former executive assistant to the governor.

=== Declined 2010 U.S. Senate bid ===
In February 2009, Pataki was approached by Sen. John Cornyn, head of the Republican Senatorial Campaign Committee, about a possible 2010 run for the U.S. Senate seat to which Kirsten Gillibrand had been appointed. In April 2010, Pataki said he would not run against Gillibrand.

=== 2012 presidential speculation ===
In November 2009, Pataki traveled to Iowa, sparking speculation. Ending months of speculation, Pataki announced on August 26, 2011, that he would not run for the Republican presidential nomination. He endorsed Mitt Romney.

=== Revere America ===
Pataki announced in April 2010 that he was creating a nonprofit organization, Revere America, that would advocate repeal of the recently enacted United States Patient Protection and Affordable Care Act, which he said was a "horrific" and costly bungle. As of 2015, the organization is defunct.

=== 2016 presidential campaign ===
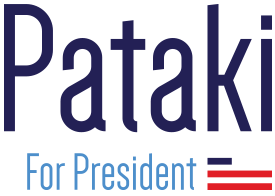
Pataki's campaign logo

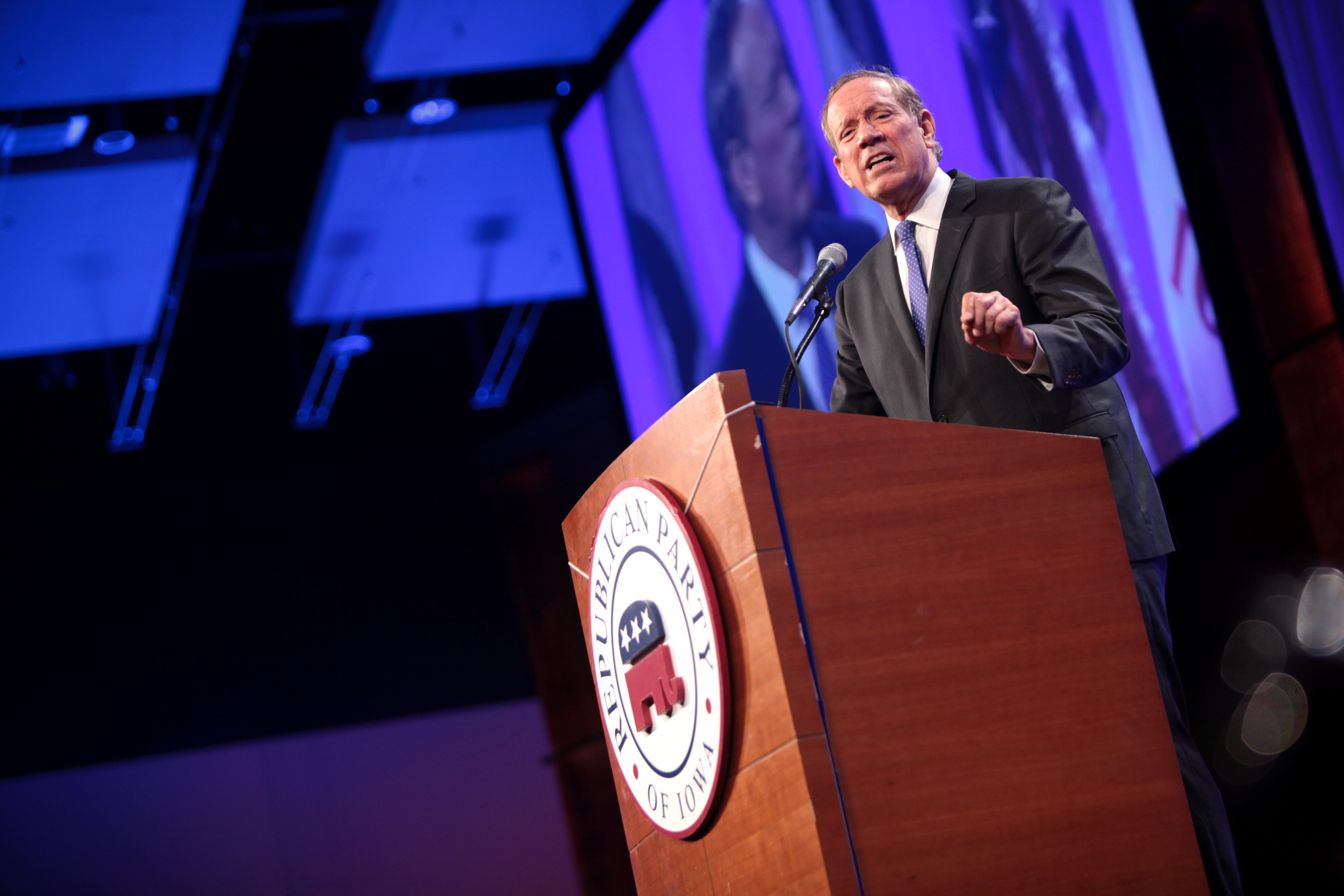
Pataki speaking before the Iowa Republican Party in Des Moines, Iowa, in May 2015

In early 2015, Pataki started exploring a candidacy for the 2016 Republican presidential nomination; On May 28, 2015, Pataki formally announced his campaign for the 2016 Republican nomination. He had previously considered running in 2008 and in 2012, but had decided against it.

Pataki's candidacy was considered a long-shot because of his age, because he had not run for office since 2002, and because of his liberal stances on abortion, gun control and environmental protection. Pataki received the endorsements of two New Hampshire State Senators: John Reagan and Nancy Stiles.

Pataki's run failed to gain traction. He failed to make the main stage in the candidate debates, being relegated to the undercard debates or being excluded altogether. His national poll numbers stayed in the one percent range. Pataki did not file to be on the primary ballot in multiple states and missed the filing deadlines for Alabama, Arkansas, Idaho, Ohio, Oklahoma, Texas, Utah, and Virginia. On December 29, 2015, Pataki ended his campaign before the Republican presidential primaries had begun. He endorsed Florida Senator Marco Rubio on January 26, 2016 and went on to endorse Ohio Governor John Kasich after Rubio suspended his campaign.

After video footage of eventual nominee Donald Trump making lewd comments about women emerged on October 7, 2016, Pataki described the Republican nominee's candidacy as "a poisonous mix of bigotry & ignorance." Pataki also called upon Trump to step down as the Republican nominee.

=== 2020 presidential election ===
In 2020, he declined to endorse Donald Trump for re-election. He stopped short of endorsing Joe Biden, citing disagreements with foreign policy relating to U.S.-China relations. Pataki opposed efforts to decertify the election results.

=== 2022 New York gubernatorial election ===
In September 2022, Pataki endorsed Republican candidate Lee Zeldin for Governor of New York, against incumbent Democrat Kathy Hochul. Zeldin went on to lose the election by 6.4%, the closest margin since Pataki's 1994 win.

=== 2026 9/11 anniversary ===
Pataki was among several Republican politicians, including former New York City Mayor Rudolph Guliani, who said current mayor Zohran Mamdani should stay away from the 25th anniversary event. The politicians contend Mandami supports the Islamic extremism that led to the terror attacks. Mamdani’s defenders say those suspicions are baseless and are driven by Islamophobia.

== Personal life ==
Pataki married his wife, Libby, in 1973. The Patakis have four children.

Pataki is Catholic.

Pataki suffered a burst appendix and had an emergency appendectomy on February 16, 2006, at Hudson Valley Hospital Center. Six days later, he developed a post-surgical complication (bowel obstruction caused by adhesions) and was transferred to New York-Presbyterian/Columbia University Medical Center for a second operation. From there, he was discharged on March 6.

== Foreign honors ==
- Hungary – Order of Merit of the Republic of Hungary (2008)

== See also ==
- Republican Party presidential candidates, 2016

Party political offices
Preceded by Pete Rinfret	Republican nominee for Governor of New York; 1994, 1998, 2002	Succeeded by John Faso
Preceded by Herbert London	Conservative nominee for Governor of New York; 1994, 1998, 2002	Succeeded by John Faso
Political offices
Preceded by Mario Cuomo	Governor of New York; 1995–2006	Succeeded by Eliot Spitzer
U.S. order of precedence (ceremonial)
Preceded by Martha McSally as Former U.S. Senator	Order of precedence of the United States; Within New York	Succeeded by Eliot Spitzer as Former Governor
Preceded by Glenn Youngkin as Former Governor	Order of precedence of the United States; Outside New York	Succeeded by Eliot Spitzer as Former Governor
