= Alpha Digamma =

American college fraternity (1859–1920)

- ΑϜ
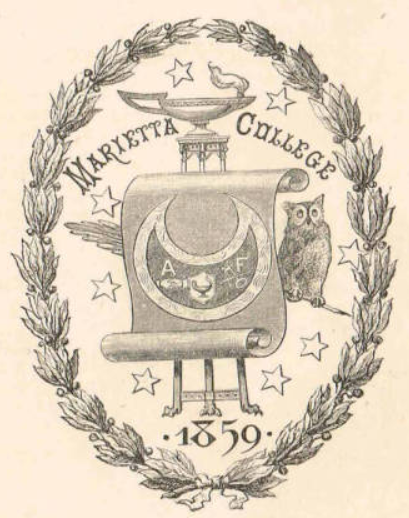
- Coat of Arms of Alpha Digamma
- Founded: February 16, 1859; 167 years ago Marietta College
- Type: Social
- Affiliation: Independent
- Status: Merged
- Merge date: February 6, 1920
- Successor: Alpha Tau Omega
- Scope: Regional
- Member badge
- Colors: Black and Old Gold
- Symbol: Lamp, dagger, key, and clasped hands
- Mascot: Owl
- Publication: Digamma Record
- Chapters: 4
- Members: 300+ lifetime
- Nickname: Digs, Dig
- Headquarters: Marietta, Ohio; United States

Alpha Digamma (ΑϜ) was an American collegiate fraternity. It was established in 1859 at Marietta College in Marietta, Ohio. The fraternity expanded to include four chapters in Ohio and Delaware. After 61 years, its last active chapter merged into Alpha Tau Omega in 1920. Digamma is an archaic Greek letter.

== History ==
Alpha Digamma (Note: Digamma is an archaic letter of the Greek alphabet, similar to "W".) was established in February 1859 at Marietta College in Marietta Ohio. The first meeting was held in A. J. McKim's dormitory room No. 20 N.H., on February 7. At its second meeting, the fraternity adopted a constitution and, thus, considered February 16, 1859 as its founding date. The founders members were Russell Bottsford Brownell, Thomas J. Cochran, Timothy Lewis Condit, Ephraim Cutler Dawes, Rufus R. Dawes, William H. Fleek, John Calvin Garrison, Josiah Henry Jenkins, Isaac Hollenbach Johnson, Joseph Addison Kingsbury, Frank Putnam Lutz, John Newton Lyle, Reese Marshall Newport, Edwin Wilder Newton, Andrew Jackson McKim, and Henry Martin Parker. Rufus Dawes wrote the fraternity's constitution and bylaws.

Alpha Digamma was the first successful local fraternity at Marietta College. It formed from an society created to participate in literary society politics. The 1883 Mariettian yearbook noted, "The work of Alpha Digamma has ever been in perfect harmony with the object and purpose of the Literary Societies and for the advancement of the best interests of Marietta College."

In 1860, a second chapter, Beta, was chartered at Delaware College; however, its charter was revoked due to its members' misconduct. A third chapter was formed at Kenyon College in 1860, but it went inactive the next year. A fourth chapter was chartered at Ohio Wesleyan University in 1864, but withdrew in 1873 to join Chi Phi.

Membership in Alpha Digamma was limited by its charter. By 1879, the fraternity had initiated 168 members; that number had increased to nearly 200 in 1883. At that time, it was the oldest fraternity at Marietta College. The fraternity established the Andrews Scholarship in 1890, named in honor of Marietta College's president Israel Ward Andrews.

In 1890, the 4th edition of Baird's Manual of American College Fraternities notes that the fraternity was inactive, with the Alpha chapter closing in February 1890. However, Baird's Manual lists the fraternity as active in its 1898 edition, with the Marietta chapter having initiated 250 members. The chapter's hall was in a rented room on Putnam Street. In November 1897, Alpha rented rooms on the third floor of the McCulloch Building on Greene Street in Marietta. There, the chapter held is annual commencement banquet and dance, with also served as reunions.

The chapter moved into Schlicher Hall at 110 Front Street on October 1, 1900. However, the fraternity was down to one active member in 1902. That member reestablished the fraternity, which moved to the third floor of the Register-Leader Building on 211 Second Street. Its membership had grown to 300 by 1905. In December 1910, the fraternity gave up its rooms in the Register-Leader Building and began meeting at the homes of alumni.

During the 1915–1916 academic year, Alpha Digamma began investigating a merger with a national fraternity. Because Alpha Tau Omega's chapter at Marietta College had been inactive since 1898, Alpha Digamma petitioned to join that fraternity. However, the merger was delayed by World War I. Finally, Alpha Digamma merged with Alpha Tau Omega on February 7, 1920, reviving the Beta Rho chapter. At the merger ceremony, 54 members of Alpha Digamma became members of Alpha Tau Omega. The merger was celebrated by a banquet at the Lafayette Hotel. At the time of the merger, Alpha Digamma was known as "the oldest local fraternity west of the Alleghany Mountains".

== Symbols ==
Alpha Digamma's colors were black and old gold. (Note: Baird's Manual refers to the fraternity's colors as black and gold, whereas Marietta College yearbooks indicate that the fraternity's colors were black and old gold.) The fraternity's badge was "a crescent-shaped disk, in the broadest part of which is a shield-shaped space bearing a lighted lamp. To the left and right are the Greek letters Α and Ϝ. (Note: While pronunciation differs between the two, note the similarity in design to the English letter F, where the Digamma has a short downward stroke off the lower horizontal bar, in both upper case and lower case, and which is not merely a serif.) Beneath the Α are clasped hands, while beneath the Ϝ are a key and dagger crossed."

The fraternity's semi-annual publication was the Digamma Record. It also published a member's catalog in 1880. The fraternity's nickname was "the Dig", and its members were called "the Digs".

== Chapters ==
Following is a list of the chapters of Alpha Digamma. The local fraternity of the same name that was established at the University of Utah in 1902 is unrelated.

Chapter	Charter date and range	Institution	Location	Status	Ref.
Alpha	February 16, 1859 – February 7, 1920	Marietta College	Marietta Ohio	Merged (ΑΤΩ)	(Note: The chapter merged with Alpha Tau Omega, reestablishing its Beta Rho chapter.)
Beta (First)	1860–1864	Delaware College	Newark, Delaware	Inactive	(Note: This chapter lost its charter for member misconduct.)
Gamma	1860–1861	Kenyon College	Gambier, Ohio	Inactive	
Beta	1864–1873	Ohio Wesleyan University	Delaware, Ohio	Withdrew (ΧΦ)	(Note: This chapter withdrew in 1893 to join Chi Phi; it was chartered as part of Chi Phi in 1898.)

== Notable members ==
- Charles Sumner Dana (Alpha), Ohio Senate
- Beman Gates Dawes (Alpha, honorary), United States House of Representatives
- Ephraim C. Dawes, (Alpha), president of the Carbondale and Shawnee Railroad and vice president of the St. Louis Coal Railroad
- Rufus Dawes (Alpha), United States House of Representatives and brevet brigadier general during the American Civil War
- Don Drumm (Alpha), college football and college basketball player and coach
- Herman E. Gieske (Alpha), journalist, author, and newspaper editor
- Ban Johnson (Alpha), executive in professional baseball who served as the founder and first president of the American League
- Edward Dana Johnson (Alpha), journalist and editor of The Santa Fe New Mexican
- Oakley Johnson (Alpha), judge of the Supreme Court of West Virginia
- Grover Pierpont (Alpha), district judge in Wichita, Kansas

== See also ==
- List of social fraternities
