= Ephraim C. Dawes =

US soldier during the American Civil War

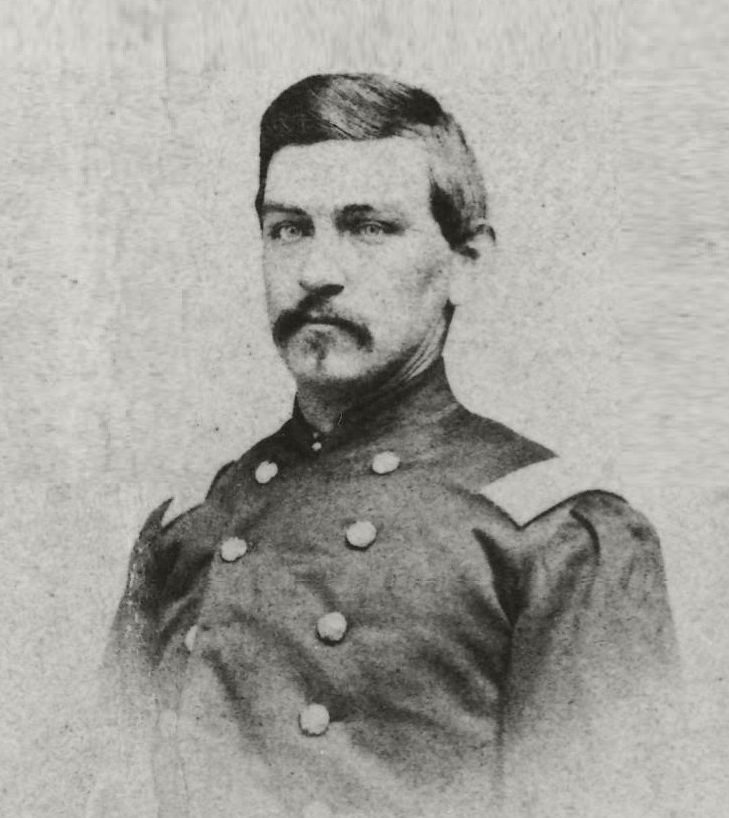
- 1863 photo of Dawes
- Born: May 27, 1840; Marietta, Ohio
- Died: April 23, 1895 (aged 54); Cincinnati, Ohio
- Military career
- Allegiance: United States
- Branch: United States Army; Union Army
- Service years: 1861–1864
- Rank: Major
- Unit: 53rd Ohio Infantry
- Conflicts: American Civil War: Battle of Shiloh; Siege of Corinth; Battle of Resaca; Battle of Atlanta; Jackson Expedition; Battle of Dallas

Ephraim Cutler Dawes (May 27, 1840 – April 23, 1895) was a major in the 53rd Ohio Infantry and brevet lieutenant-colonel, United States Volunteers, during the American Civil War. Dawes was present at the Battle of Shiloh and Battle of Vicksburg, among others, serving under Ulysses S. Grant and William T. Sherman. One of his notable acts occurred during battle, where Dawes disobeyed and cursed an officer who had become scared and disoriented. While serving with Sherman during his march to Atlanta Dawes was seriously wounded in his lower jaw in what would be his last battle, subsequently being honorably discharged in 1864.

After the war, Dawes began a business career working for various Cincinnati railroad companies and later was engaged in railroad operations in several other states. He also became involved with historical works and writings of the Civil War. Despite the wound to his jaw Dawes became a noted public speaker and was a member of numerous historical societies. During his lifetime Dawes amassed one of the largest collections of books and manuscripts on the Civil War.

== Family and early life ==
Ephraim Dawes was born on May 27, 1840, near Malta, Ohio, and was the youngest child among six siblings. His parents were Henry and Sarah Cutler Dawes. His father died in 1860. The most famous member of the Dawes family in its early years was William Dawes Jr., who accompanied Paul Revere on his historic ride April 19, 1775 to warn Lexington and Concord of the advancing British troops. His grandfather, Judge Ephraim Cutler, whom he was named after, was prominent in Ohio's early history.

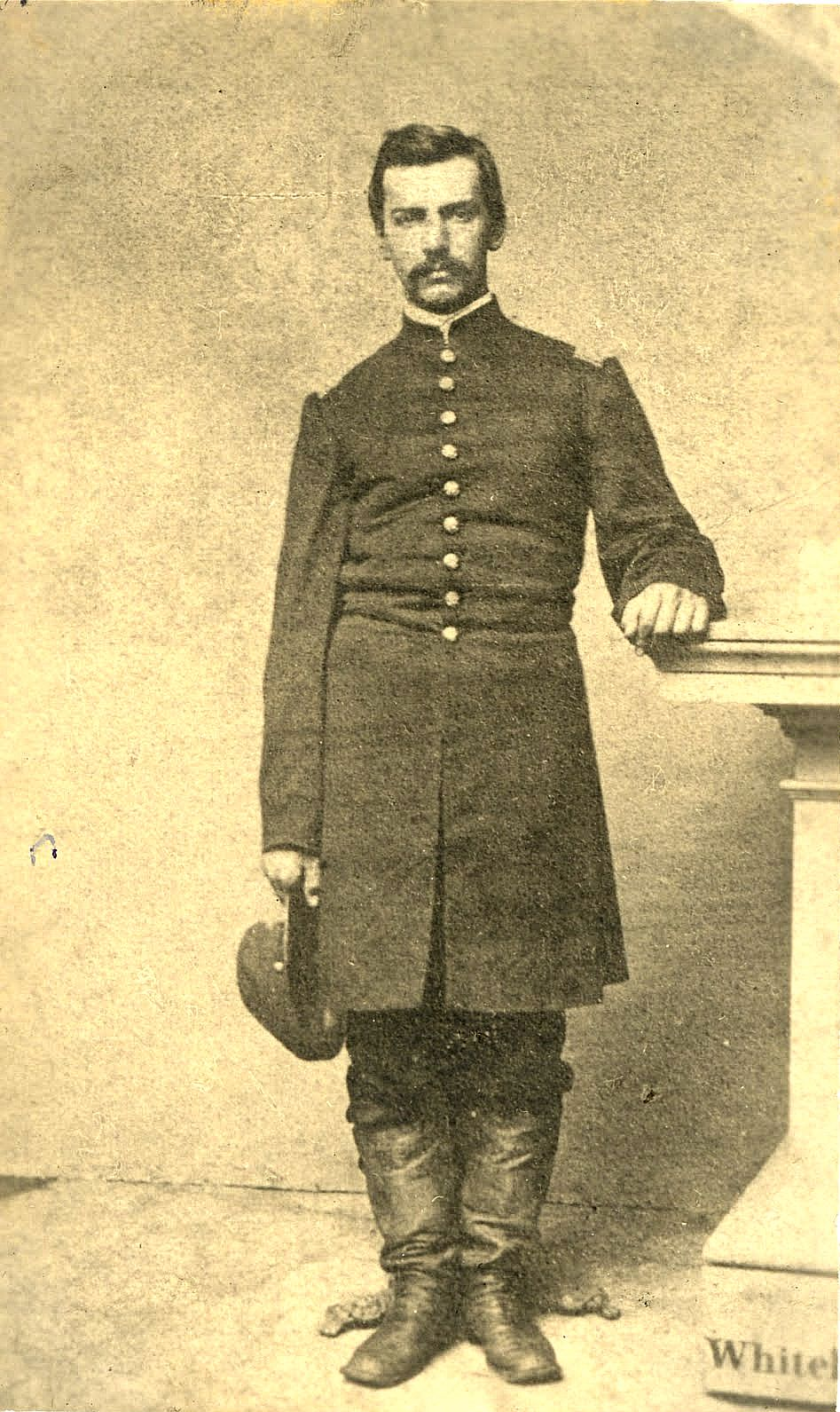
Rufus Dawes elder brother to Ephraim lieutenant colonel, Wisconsin Volunteer Infantry

Ephraim's uncle, William P. Cutler, exerted much influence on the young Dawes, whose example in public and private life, inspired Dawes in his pursuits in public and military life. His elder brother, Rufus, (Note: Rufus's son, Charles G. Dawes became Vice President under Calvin Coolidge in 1925,) had served as a lieutenant colonel in the 6th Wisconsin Volunteer Infantry Regiment and was part of the Iron Brigade which fought during the Civil War at the Battle of Gettysburg. Dawes married Frances Bosworth In 1866, and settled in Cincinnati, Ohio. They did not have any children.

Dawes was a member of several literary and historical societies and also published a number of historical works, often speaking on various historical topics.

== Military career ==
Just before his military career Dawes attended the University of Wisconsin for two years, and then two years at Marietta College where he was a founder of Alpha Digamma and graduated with a bachelor's degree in 1861. That same year the Civil War broke out and Dawes immediately enlisted in the 53rd Ohio Volunteer Infantry, in which he was a First Lieutenant. While an infantryman Dawes participated in a number of the costliest battles of the Civil War. The Fifty-third Ohio Regiment began to recruit at Camp Diamond, Jackson, Ohio, in early September, 1861, and was not completely organized until February, 1862. Dawes's regimental commander was Colonel Jesse J. Appler. Dawes found his commander to be of little education, yet intelligent, but lacking in military experience and knowledge of army regulations. On February 16, Dawes, with the 53rd, departed Portsmouth, Ohio on a steamboat for Paducah, Kentucky, arriving there on February 23, and was assigned to the 3rd brigade in General Sherman's division.

=== Battle of Shiloh ===
Dawes was present at the Battle of Shiloh, April 6–7, 1862, in southwestern Tennessee which was the most costly battle of the Civil War up to that point. Dawes and the 53rd Ohio Infantry served with distinction, (Note: Dawes was in Company A) managing to keep well ordered during the otherwise chaotic battle. The 53rd was the vanguard of Sherman's line.

Dawes accompanied by Captain Jones, Lieutenant Starkey were positioned on the ground in front of Company A. General Sherman, with his spyglass, was looking along the extent of the line the Confederate regiment as they marched across Rea field. Dawes observed a group of mounted Confederate officers, bearing a dark blue flag with a white center, that of General Patrick R. Cleburne, who was considered the "Stonewall of the West". He later wrote an eyewitness account of the battle as he saw it in an 1896 historical publication called Sketches of War History, 1861–1865, vol 4, entitled My First Day Under Fire at Shiloh, which he presented to the Cincinnati Chapter of the Military Order of the Loyal Legion. (Note: MOLLUS was organized April 15, 1865, days after Lee's surrender at Appomattox by officers of the Army, Navy, or Marine Corps of the United States.)

During the battle Dawes witnessed Appler lose his nerve when the fighting became intense when Appler cried out, "retreat, and save yourselves!" even though his men were winning the engagement, where several companies turned in earnest retreat. Appalled and shaken and finding Appler at the front of a great battle, Dawes, risking repercussions, cursed him and flatly exclaimed to Appler, "Colonel, I will not do it!", whereupon Appler sprang to his feet and ran away. Many of the troops subsequently retreated, but upon the arrival of General John McClernand, he ordered them back and had them form a line with his division near the Shiloh Chapel. Dawes in his account said the fighting at that point became "hot and heavy" receiving fire from a nearby Confederate battery, which was inflicting heavy losses on the 57th Ohio infantry. Senior Captain Wells Jones (Note: Jones was breveted a brigadier general near the end of the war) was now in command of the reassembled company, at which time Dawes informed him that Appler had run away and that he (Dawes) had ordered his regiment to close up the right to help the 57th infantry. Jones agreed and Dawes set out and informed the other company commanders what had transpired. In April, 1862, Colonel Jesse J. Appler was relieved from the command of the 53rd Ohio Volunteer Infantry.

After the Battle of Shiloh, Confederate General P. G. T. Beauregard and his defeated army managed to escape back to Corinth. Major General Henry Halleck, who received much criticism for allowing Beauregard to escape, finally pursued the Confederates three weeks after the battle, on May 3, and conducted a month-long siege of the city that lasted until May 30, 1862. The siege resulted in the capture of the town by Federal forces.

=== Vicksburg Campaign ===
In January 1863, before the actual engagement Dawes was promoted to the rank of Major of his regiment in preference over other Captains. In this capacity he served under General Ulysses S. Grant.

As Major he served in the Vicksburg campaign under General Grant and engaged the Confederates at Black river, which resulted in the capture of this strategic city on the Mississippi River. The Siege of Vicksburg, on May 18 – July 4, 1863, was the final major military action in the Vicksburg Campaign of the American Civil War. After Dawes and the 53rd advanced on Jackson, Mississippi and participated in the capture of that city. Dawes and the 53rd then returned to the Black river and went into camp. Dawes and his regiment was transferred to eastern Tennessee and participated in the battle of Missionary ridge.

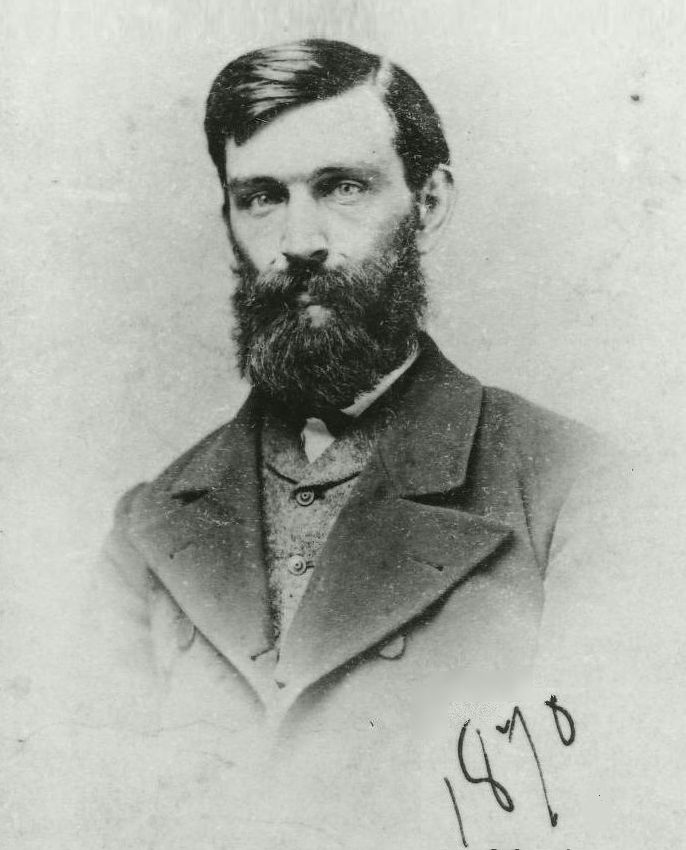
Ephraim C. Dawes in 1870 Dawes was shot in the jaw during the Battle of Dallas in 1864, leaving him permanently disfigured. He later grew a full beard to cover his scars.

=== Atlanta Campaign ===
Dawes next served under General Sherman during his advance against Jackson, Mississippi, and by early 1864 his regiment was again with Sherman's army during his march to the Sea to against Atlanta, engaging in the Battle of Resaca, May 13–15, 1864, and later at the Battle of Dallas.

In 1864 Dawes's regiment under Sherman's advanced against Confederate forces in Atlanta, engaging in the battles at Resaca and Dallas which occurred between May 26 and June 4, 1864, in and around Dallas, Georgia, between Lt. General William J. Hardee's Confederate corps and the Union defense line, held by the XV Corps under Maj. General John A. Logan of the Army of the Tennessee. From June 9 to July 2 Dawes's regiment fought at the Battle of Kennesaw Mountain and at the Battle of Peachtree Creek and took part in the siege of Atlanta, moving in November on Sherman's march to the sea; losses were 26 killed and 141 wounded at New Hope Church.

On May 28, 1864, at the Battle of Dallas, there was at the center of Dawes's regiment a road leading to Lost Mountain which was left open. It was the evident to Dawes that the Confederates were going to force their way through this road and capture the Union supply trains. Dawes ascertained the Union line could break at this point, so he rushed to the road just as the Confederate advance was within about 50 feet of the Union line which began to waver. During the melee of battle Dawes was struck by a Minié ball on the left side of his lower jaw. It tore off his lower lip and chin so that it hung down, removing almost all his lower teeth and cut his tongue. As he was carried off Dawes managed to scribe in the dust on the carriage floor, "Good for a 60 day furlough?" Dawes subsequently was honorably discharged on October 31, 1864. After months of suffering from this wound, Dawes had his jaw reconstructed by Dr. George Blackman, and finally was restored to health. Despite the serious wound to his jaw, Dawes later went on to become a gifted public speaker.

== Later life ==
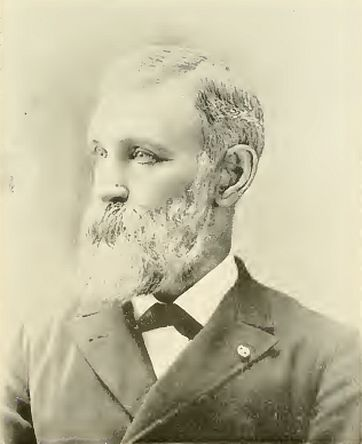
Dawes in later life

After being honorably discharged from the army in 1864, Dawes spent the remainder of his life pursuing both business, academic and historical interests, and wrote a number of books.

=== Business ===
Dawes entered the railroad business, beginning with Cincinnati railroad companies in Illinois, Indiana, and Missouri. Although successful at first he lost his fortune in the 1873 economic crash and During the economic panic of 1873 Dawes fell into bankruptcy by 1874, but was able to start up again, dealing in railroad supplies like oils and iron. He also worked developing coal fields in Southern Illinois. Soon Dawes started up a sizeable and prosperous trade in Saint Louis and Chicago and soon became the president of the Saint Louis and Big Muddy Coal Company, one among the biggest mining companies in Illinois.

=== Historical research and writings ===
As a veteran who had witnessed many battles during the Civil War, Dawes was inherently interested in its history and became involved in the research and writing about the many episodes that occurred during that war, publishing and often speaking at various organizations about the many Civil War subjects.

Though Dawes had received a serious wound to his jaw during the Civil War, he was a gifted speaker and was in constant demand for speaking at local and political campaigns. His speeches and addresses, most notably at a banquet of the Army of the Tennessee in 1879, and at Memorial Day Exercises at Cincinnati in 1880, brought him great notoriety as a public speaker. He was keenly interested in almost everything associated with that War, and was also interested in some of the other wars in America that came before it. Subsequently, he devoted the remainder of his life in obtaining all the publications, letters and manuscripts of historical value that he could acquire on the subject. In his effort he amassed a sizeable and significant collection of these things, always making sure that his writing and reference work reflected both the Union and Confederate points of view. He became an avid collector of Civil War manuscripts, books, and pamphlets.

Dawes collection of books and papers covering the history of Civil War was equaled by only one other in the United States. Dawes's works include: " The Beginnings of the Ohio Company," and "Sketch of William P. Cutler." He was a contributing author to " Battles and Leaders of the Civil War," and also to other magazines. In 1885 he published in book form, the 'Biographical Sketch of Gen. Rufus Putnam." Among his most noted works is his account of his experiences at the Battle of Shiloh, entitled Sketches of War History, My First Day Under Fire at Shiloh, published in 1896.

Dawes was a trustee of the Ohio State Archaeological and Historical Society. He was also a member of the University Club of Cincinnati, Cincinnati Literary Society and the Cincinnati Historical Society He was a corresponding member of Massachusetts Military Historical Society and an honorary member of Wisconsin State Historical Society. In Buffalo, New York he belonged to the New York Historical Society. He was also active in the Rhode Island Society, Virginia Society, Ohio Society of New York, Civil Service Society of Governor's Island, and Sons of the Revolution. Dawes was also an honorary member of Folk Lore Society of London, England. He was Vice President of the Army of Tennessee, and Commander of Loyal Legion as well as a trustee of the Ohio Soldiers' and Sailors' Orphans' Home at Xenia. Ephraim Dawes died at his home in Cincinnati, Ohio on April 23, 1895.

== See also ==
- List of Ohio Civil War units
- Ohio in the Civil War
- Bibliography of the American Civil War

== Bibliography ==
- Cutter, William Richard (1913). New England Families, Genealogical and Memorial. Lewis historical publishing Company.
- Dawes, Ephraim Cutler (1882). The beginning of the Ohio Company. Cincinnati, P. G. Thomson.
- ——; Stone, Henry (1895). Campaigns in Kentucky and Tennessee including the battle of Chickamauga, 1862–1864. Boston : Military Historical Society of Massachusetts.
- —— (1896). Chamberlin, W.H. (ed.). Sketches of War History, 1861–1865: Papers Read Before the Ohio Commandery of the Military Order of the Loyal Legion of the United States, Volume 4. Military Order of the Loyal Legion of the United States. Ohio Commandery; R. Clarke & Company.
- Duke, John K. (1900). History of the Fifty-third regiment Ohio volunteer infantry, during the war of the rebellion, 1861 to 1865. Portsmouth, O., The Blade printing company.
- Dawson, George Francis (1887). Life and services of Gen. John A. Logan : as soldier and statesman. Chicago; New York : Belford, Clarke & Co.
- Elliott, Earl Saunders (2005). CAMPAIGNS OF THE 53rd OVI 1861–1865. iUniverse. ISBN 978-0-5953-6052-9.
- Groom, Winston (2012). Shiloh 1862. National Geographic Society. ISBN 978-1-4262-0879-9.
- McDonough, James Lee (2016). William Tecumseh Sherman, In the Service of my Country, A Life. W. W. Norton & Company, New York. ISBN 978-0-3932-4212-6.
- E.O. Randall, ed. (1895). Ohio Archæological and Historical Quarterly. – * Dawes page
- Sickles, Daniel E. (ed (1908). The Union Army: States and regiments ). Federal Publishing Company.
- Wilson, Harriett Dawes, and E. C. Dawes (1967) Major Ephraim C. Dawes of the 53d Ohio Volunteers and the Battle of Dallas, Georgia, May 28, 1864. Elmhurst, Ill: Crum Letter Service, OCLC 3022958
- White, Ronald C. (2016). American Ulysses: A Life of Ulysses S. Grant. Random House Publishing Group. ISBN 978-1-5883-6992-5.
- "Ephraim C. Dawes Papers". Newberry Library. Archived from the original on June 10, 2018.
- "Dawes, E. C. (Ephraim Cutler), né 1840". Institute for Advanced Technology in the Humanities.
- "Ephraim Cutler Dawes Civil War Uniform". State Library of Ohio: Ohio History Connection.
