= Don Drumm =

Don Drumm may refer to:

- Don Drumm (American football) (1887–1968), American football player and coach
- Don Drumm (sculptor) (born 1935), American sculptor, designer and master craftsman
- Don Drumm (singer), American country music singer
