= 53rd Ohio Infantry Regiment =

American Union army infantry regiment

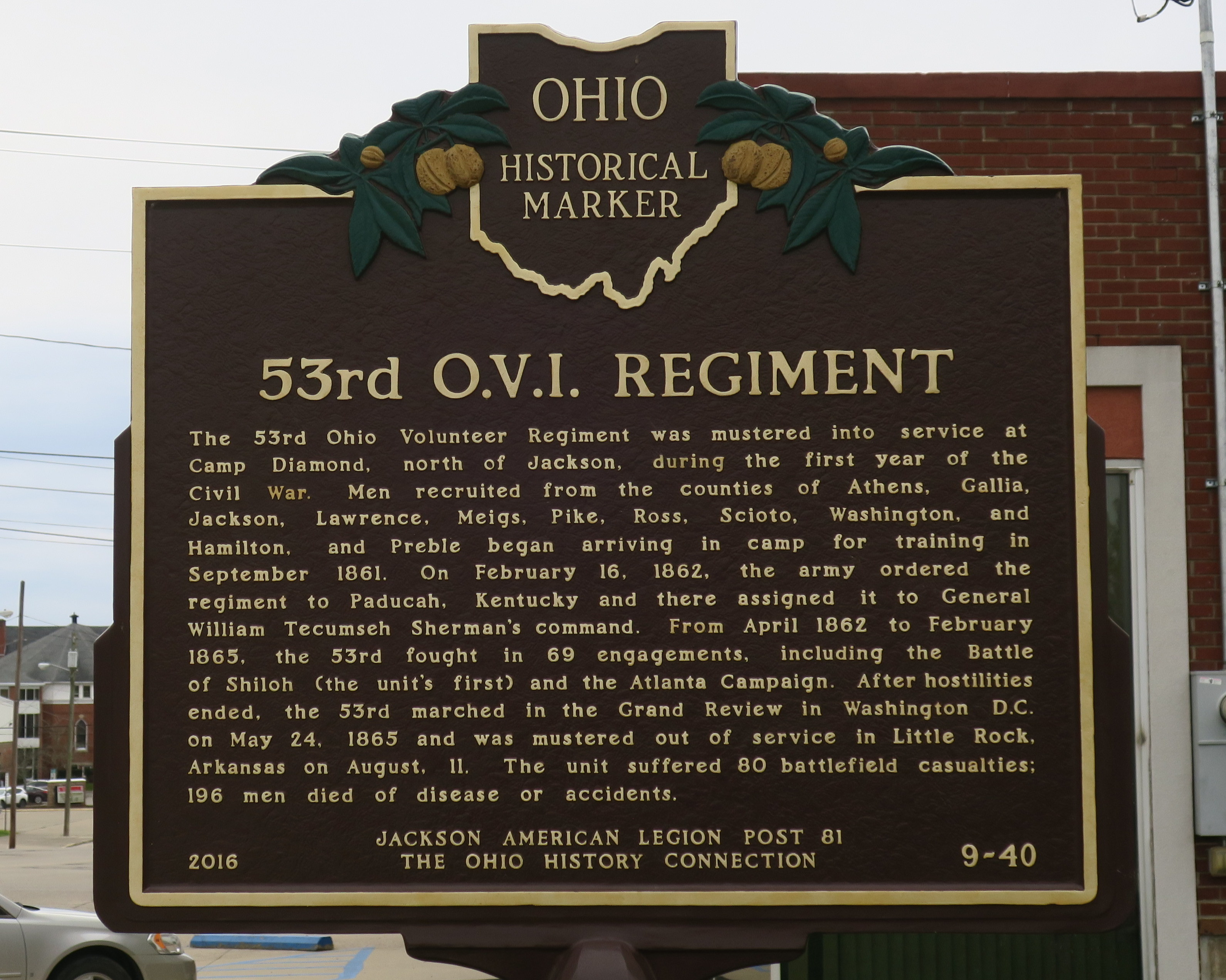
- Ohio Historical Marker for the 53rd Ohio Infantry Regiment in Jackson, Ohio
- Active: September 3, 1861, to August 11, 1865
- Country: United States
- Allegiance: Union
- Branch: Union Army
- Type: Infantry
- Engagements: Battle of Shiloh; Siege of Corinth; Siege of Vicksburg; Siege of Jackson; Battle of Missionary Ridge; Atlanta campaign; Battle of Resaca; Battle of Dallas; Battle of New Hope Church; Battle of Allatoona; Battle of Kennesaw Mountain; Battle of Atlanta; Siege of Atlanta; Battle of Jonesboro; Battle of Lovejoy's Station; Sherman's March to the Sea; Carolinas campaign; Battle of Bentonville

The 53rd Ohio Infantry Regiment was an infantry regiment in the Union Army during the American Civil War. The 53rd was present at the Battle of Shiloh and Battle of Vicksburg, among a number of other engagements.

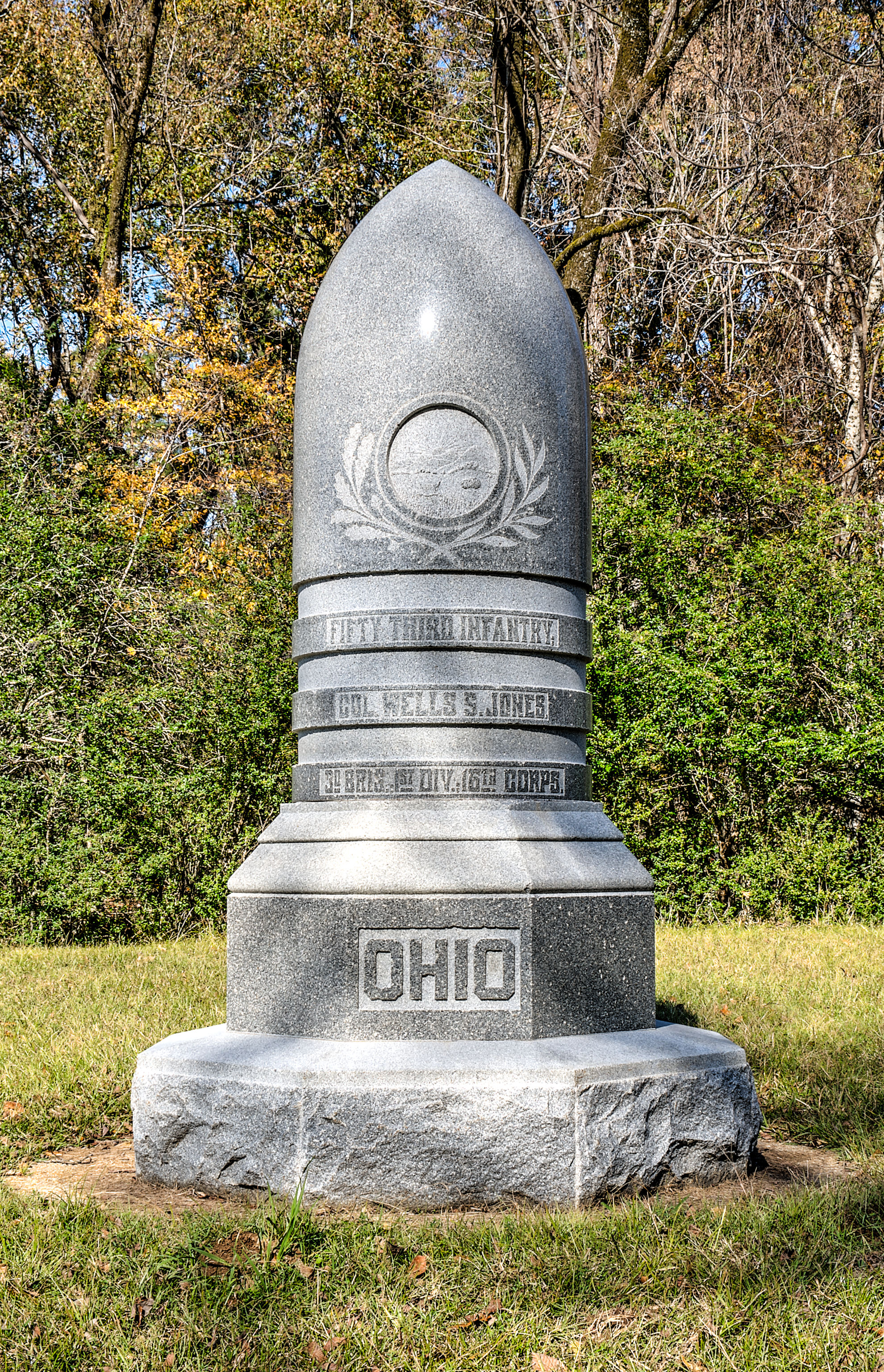
Memorial at Vicksburg National Military Park

== Service ==
The 53rd Ohio Infantry Regiment was organized at Jackson, Ohio, beginning September 3, 1861, and mustered in February 11, 1862, for three years' service under the command of Colonel J. J. Appler.

The regiment was attached to District of Paducah, Kentucky, to March 1862. 3rd Brigade, 5th Division, Army of the Tennessee, to July 1862. 3rd Brigade, 5th Division, District of Memphis, Tennessee, to November 1862. 3rd Brigade, 5th Division, Right Wing, XIII Corps, Department of the Tennessee, November 1862. 2nd Brigade, 1st Division, District of Memphis, XIII Corps, to December 1862. 2nd Brigade, 1st Division, XVII Corps, to January 1863. 2nd Brigade, 1st Division, XVI Corps, to July 1863. 3rd Brigade, 4th Division, XV Corps, to May 1864. 2nd Brigade, 2nd Division, XV Corps, to July 1865. Department of Arkansas to August 1865.

The 53rd Ohio Infantry mustered out of service at Little Rock, Arkansas, on August 11, 1865.

== Detailed service ==
Ordered to Paducah, Ky., February 16. Moved from Paducah to Savannah, Tenn., March 6–10, 1862. Expedition to Yellow Creek, Miss., and occupation of Pittsburg Landing, Tenn., March 14–17. Expedition toward Eastport, Miss., April 1–2. Battle of Shiloh, Tenn., April 6–7. Corinth Road, Monterey, April 8. Advance on and siege of Corinth, Miss., April 29-May 30. March to Memphis, Tenn., via Moscow, Lafayette, Grand Junction and Holly Springs, June 1-July 21. Duty at Memphis and along Memphis & Charleston Railroad until November. Grant's Central Mississippi Campaign. Operations on the Mississippi Central Railroad to the Yockna River November 1862 to January 1863. Moved to LaGrange, Tenn., January 1863, and duty there until June. Moved to Memphis, thence to Young's Point, La., June 9–12. Siege of Vicksburg, Miss., June 12-July 4. Advance on Jackson, Miss., July 4–10. Bolton's Ferry July 4–6. Siege of Jackson July 10–17. Camp at Big Black until September 26. Moved to Memphis, thence march to Chattanooga, Tenn., September 26-November 20. Operations on Memphis & Charleston Railroad in Alabama October 20–29. Chattanooga-Ringgold Campaign November 23–27. Tunnel Hill November 23–24. Missionary Ridge November 25. March to relief of Knoxville, Tenn., November 28-December 28. Duty at Scottsboro, Ala., until March 1864. Veterans on furlough until April. Atlanta Campaign May to September. Demonstrations on Resaca May 8–13. Near Resaca May 13. Battle of Resaca May 14–15. Advance on Dallas May 18–25. Operations on line of Pumpkin Vine Creek and battles about Dallas, New Hope Church and Allatoona Hills May 25-June 5. Operations about Marietta and against Kennesaw Mountain June 10-July 2. Bush Mountain June 15. Assault on Kennesaw June 27. Nickajack Creek July 2–5. Ruff's Mills July 3–4. Chattahoochie River July 6–17. Battle of Atlanta July 22. Siege of Atlanta July 22-August 25. Ezra Chapel, Hood's 2nd sortie. July 28. Flank movement on Jonesboro August 25–30. Near Jonesboro August 30. Battle of Jonesboro August 31-September 1. Lovejoy's Station September 2–6. Operations against Hood in northern Georgia and northern Alabama September 29-November 3. Turkeytown and Gadsden Road, Ala., October 25. March to the sea November 15-December 10. Siege of Savannah December 10–21. Fort McAllister December 13. Campaign of the Carolinas January to April 1865. Salkehatchie Swamps, S.C., February 2–5. Cannon's Bridge, South Edisto River, February 8. North Edisto River February 11–13. Columbia February 16–17. Battle of Bentonville, N.C., March 20–21. Occupation of Goldsboro March 24. Advance on Raleigh April 10–14. Occupation of Raleigh April 14. Bennett's House April 26. Surrender of Johnston and his army. March to Washington, D.C., via Richmond, Va., April 29-May 20. Grand Review of the Armies May 24. Moved to Louisville, Ky., June, thence to Little Rock, Ark., and duty there until August.

== Casualties ==
The regiment lost a total of 276 men during service; 4 officers and 76 enlisted men killed or mortally wounded, 6 officers and 190 enlisted men died of disease.

== Commanders ==
- Colonel J. J. Appler - resigned April 1862
- Colonel Wells S. Jones

== Other Officers ==
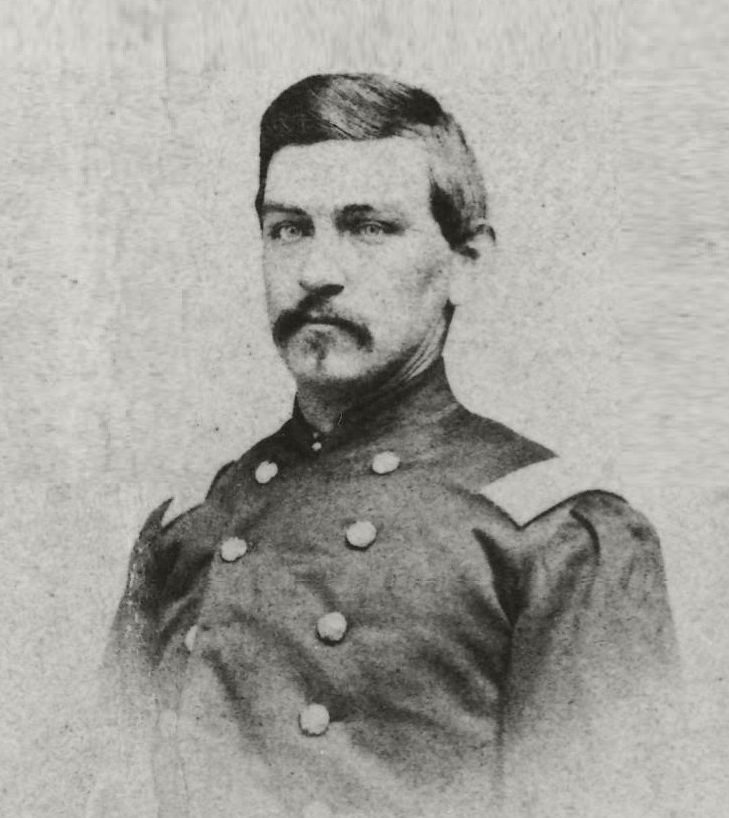
Major Ephraim C. Dawes

== See also ==
- List of Ohio Civil War units
- Ohio in the Civil War
