= SS Rufus C. Dawes =

Liberty ship of WWII

History

United States
- Name: Rufus C. Dawes
- Namesake: Rufus C. Dawes
- Owner: War Shipping Administration (WSA)
- Operator: Luckenbach Steamship Co., Inc.
- Ordered: as type (EC2-S-C1) hull, MC hull 1204
- Builder: St. Johns River Shipbuilding Company, Jacksonville, Florida
- Cost: $2,017,460
- Yard number: 12
- Way number: 6
- Laid down: 31 May 1943
- Launched: 4 September 1943
- Sponsored by: Mrs. Harry B. Hoyt
- Completed: 18 September 1943
- Identification: Call sign: KXMC
- Fate: Placed in the National Defense Reserve Fleet, Astoria, Oregon, 14 November 1946; Sold for scrapping, 29 February 1968, withdrawn from fleet, 26 March 1968

General characteristics
- Class & type: Liberty ship; type EC2-S-C1, standard
- Tonnage: 10,865 LT DWT; 7,176 GRT
- Displacement: 3,380 long tons (3,434 t) (light); 14,245 long tons (14,474 t) (max)
- Length: 441 feet 6 inches (135 m) oa; 416 feet (127 m) pp; 427 feet (130 m) lwl
- Beam: 57 feet (17 m)
- Draft: 27 ft 9.25 in (8.4646 m)
- Installed power: 2 × Oil fired 450 °F (232 °C) boilers, operating at 220 psi (1,500 kPa); 2,500 hp (1,900 kW)
- Propulsion: 1 × triple-expansion steam engine, (manufactured by General Machinery Corp., Hamilton, Ohio); 1 × screw propeller
- Speed: 11.5 knots (21.3 km/h; 13.2 mph)
- Capacity: 562,608 cubic feet (15,931 m^{3}) (grain); 499,573 cubic feet (14,146 m^{3}) (bale)
- Complement: 38–62 USMM; 21–40 USNAG
- Armament: Varied by ship; Bow-mounted 3-inch (76 mm)/50-caliber gun; Stern-mounted 4-inch (102 mm)/50-caliber gun; 2–8 × single 20-millimeter (0.79 in) Oerlikon anti-aircraft (AA) cannons and/or, 2–8 × 37-millimeter (1.46 in) M1 AA guns

SS Rufus C. Dawes was a Liberty ship built in the United States during World War II. She was named after Rufus C. Dawes, an American businessman in oil and banking from Ohio. In the 1920s he served as an expert on the commissions to prepare the Dawes Plan and the Young Plan to manage German reparations to the Allies after World War I.

== Construction ==
Rufus C. Dawes was laid down on 31 May 1943, under a Maritime Commission (MARCOM) contract, MC hull 1204, by the St. Johns River Shipbuilding Company, Jacksonville, Florida; she was sponsored by Mrs. Harry B. Hoyt, sister of the namesake, and launched on 4 September 1943.

== History ==
She was allocated to the Luckenbach Steamship Co., Inc., on 18 September 1943. On 14 November 1946, she was placed in the National Defense Reserve Fleet, Astoria, Oregon. On 21 June 1955, she was withdrawn from the fleet to be loaded with grain under the "Grain Program 1955", she returned empty on 28 June 1955. She was sold for scrapping, 29 February 1968, to Oregon Shipwreckers, Inc., for $50,985.57. She was withdrawn from the fleet, 26 March 1968.

== Bibliography ==
- "St. John's River Shipbuilding, Jacksonville FL". www.ShipbuildingHistory.com. 16 October 2010.
- Maritime Administration. "Rufus C. Dawes". Ship History Database Vessel Status Card. U.S. Department of Transportation, Maritime Administration.
- Davies, James (May 2004). "Specifications (As-Built)" (PDF). p. 23.
- "SS Rufus C. Dawes".
