= Rufus C. Dawes =

American businessman (1867–1940)

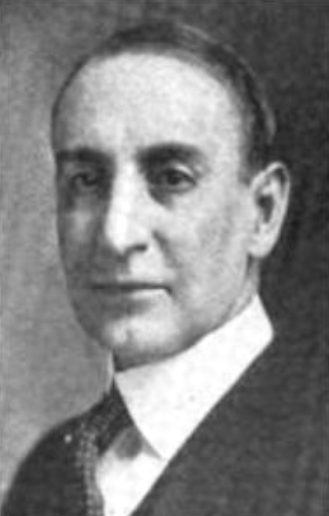
- Born: Rufus Cutler Dawes; July 30, 1867; Marietta, Ohio
- Died: January 8, 1940 (aged 72); Chicago, Illinois
- Burial place: Oak Grove Cemetery, Marietta, Ohio
- Education: Marietta College
- Occupations: Oil and Banking
- Years active: 1918–1940
- Known for: Dawes Plan; Commercial Club of Chicago; Century of Progress; World's Fair; Museum of Science and Industry (Chicago)
- Spouse: Helen B. Palmer (married 1893)
- Children: William Miles; Charles Cutler; Jean Palmer; Palmer; Margaret; Helen

Rufus Cutler Dawes (July 30, 1867 – January 8, 1940) was an American businessman in oil and banking from a prominent Ohio family. He and his three brothers all became nationally known. In the 1920s he served as an expert on the commissions to prepare the Dawes Plan and the Young Plan to manage German reparations to the Allies after World War I.

He had most of his career in Chicago, where he was involved in civic organizations. He served as president of the Commercial Club of Chicago, and from 1934-1940, as head of the World's Fair organization and the Museum of Science & Industry (MSI).

== Early life and education ==
Dawes was born in Marietta, Ohio, to Brigadier General Rufus R. Dawes and Mary Beman (Gates) Dawes. He was a younger brother of Charles G. Dawes. His two younger brothers, Beman Gates Dawes and Henry May Dawes, also achieved national reputations. His middle name of Cutler is in honor of his paternal grandmother, Sarah Cutler's family (She was a daughter of Ephraim Cutler who was the son of Manasseh Cutler.) Cutler was also the name of Lysander Cutler, one of Rufus Dawes's American Civil War colleagues in the Iron Brigade.

Dawes graduated from Marietta College with an A.B. in 1886 and A.M. in 1889.

== Marriage and family ==
He married Helen B. Palmer on June 3, 1893.

== Career ==
Dawes became active with his brothers in many gas and lighting utilities. He was selected as president of the Union Gas & Electric Company, Metropolitan Gas & Electric Company, and Dawes Brothers, Inc.

He became involved in public service in 1918, when he was appointed to serve on the Illinois State Pension Laws Commission (1918–1919). In 1920, he was selected as a delegate to the Illinois constitutional convention.

His brother Charles appointed him to serve on the experts commission preparing the Dawes Plan in 1924, to settle an international crisis in Europe and develop a staggered plan for Germany to pay its reparations. Because of his contribution, Dawes was also asked to work as assistant to Owen D. Young, who developed the succeeding Young Plan in 1929.

Dawes was a member of the Commercial Club of Chicago, serving as president in 1925–26. He was president of A Century of Progress Corporation from 1927 until his death in 1940.

From 1934 until his death, Dawes was concurrently president of the World's Fair organization and the Museum of Science & Industry (MSI). Dawes was the third president of the MSI, after Sewell Avery and William Rufus Abbott. Previously, he had been an active member of the Board of Trustees, helping to brief Waldemar Kaempffert when the latter became the first Executive Director of the Museum of Science & Industry in 1928. (Kaempffert was the New York Times science editor and served again after his time at the museum.)

Dawes was an hereditary companion of the Military Order of the Loyal Legion of the United States.

Rufus C. Dawes died in Chicago on January 8, 1940.

== Legacy and honors ==
- During World War II, in 1943 the United States Navy commissioned a Liberty Ship, named the SS Rufus C. Dawes in his honor. It was scrapped in 1968.
