= Washington State College of Ohio =

Community college in Marietta, Ohio, US

- Former names: Washington Technical Institute (1971-1972); Washington Technical College (1972-1990); Washington State Community College (1990-2023)
- Type: Public community college
- Established: 1971; 55 years ago
- Parent institution: University System of Ohio
- President: Sarah Parker
- Faculty: 59 full-time, 100 part-time
- Students: 1,652
- Location: Marietta, Ohio, United States; 39°25′52″N 81°26′02″W
- Campus: Small Town
- Nickname: Bucks
- Website: www.wsco.edu

Washington State College of Ohio (formerly Washington State Community College) is a public community college in Marietta, Ohio, United States. It was established in 1971 as Washington Technical Institute and moved to its current location in 1991. In December 2023, Washington State Community College received approval from the Ohio Department of Higher Education to change its name to its current name.

== Notable alumni ==
- Travis Flores - Children's book author, actor, and activist
