= James Joyce (Ohio politician) =

American politician (1870–1931)

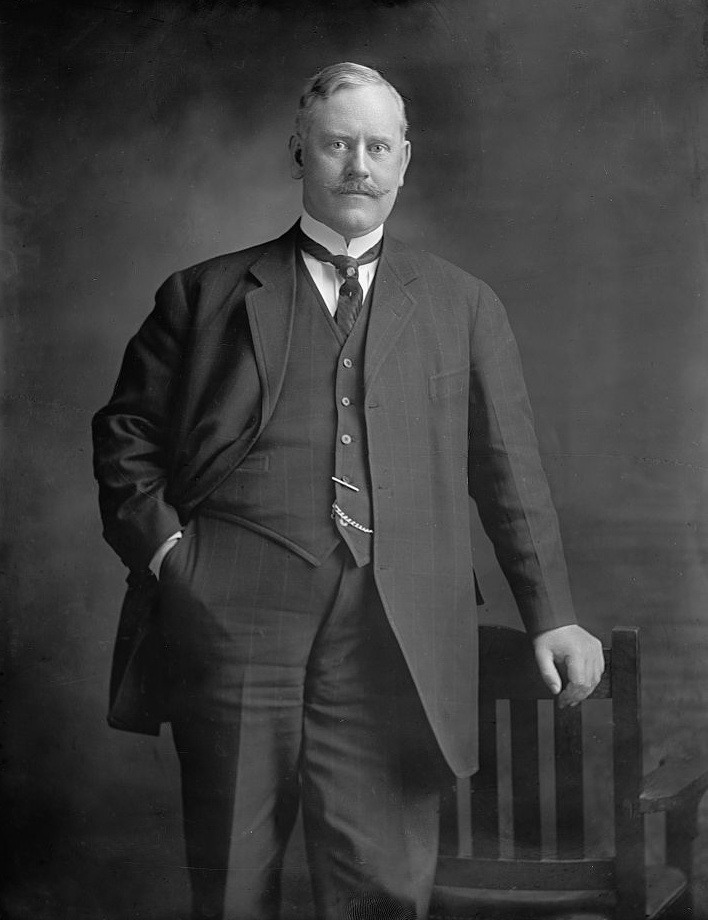
- Joyce, 1905–1931

Member of the U.S. House of Representatives from Ohio's 15th district
- In office March 4, 1909 – March 3, 1911
- Preceded by: Beman Gates Dawes
- Succeeded by: George White

Member of the Ohio House of Representatives from the Guernsey County district
- In office January 6, 1896 – December 31, 1899
- Preceded by: Nathan H. Barber
- Succeeded by: William L. Simpson

Personal details
- Born: July 2, 1870 Cumberland, Ohio, US
- Died: March 25, 1931 (aged 60) Cambridge, Ohio, US
- Resting place: Northwood Cemetery
- Party: Republican
- Education: Cincinnati Law School

James Joyce (July 2, 1870 – March 25, 1931) was an American attorney, educator, and politician who served as a member of the United States House of Representatives from Ohio's 15th congressional district for one term from 1909 to 1911.

== Early life and education ==
Born in Cumberland, Ohio, Joyce attended public schools. He taught school in Cumberland and Pleasant City, Ohio, and also studied law. He entered the Cincinnati Law School in 1891 and was graduated in 1892. He was admitted to the bar at Columbus, Ohio, on March 3, 1892.

== Career ==
He served as the superintendent of the Senecaville (Ohio) High School 1893–1895. He began the active practice of law in Cambridge, Ohio, in 1895. He served as member of the Ohio House of Representatives 1896–1900. He served as delegate to the 1904 Republican National Convention.

=== Politics ===
Joyce was elected as a Republican to the Sixty-first Congress (March 4, 1909 – March 3, 1911). He was an unsuccessful candidate for reelection in 1910 to the Sixty-second Congress.

He resumed the practice of law in Cambridge, Ohio. He was an unsuccessful candidate for election as associate justice of the Ohio Supreme Court in 1916.

== Death ==
Joyce died in Cambridge, Ohio, March 25, 1931. He was interred in the mausoleum in Northwood Cemetery.

== Sources ==
- United States Congress. "James Joyce (id: J000276)". Biographical Directory of the United States Congress.

U.S. House of Representatives
Preceded by Beman G. Dawes	U.S. Representative from Ohio's 15th Congressional District; 1909-1911	Succeeded by George White
