= Rufus Dawes =

American politician and soldier (1838–1899)

Rufus R. Dawes
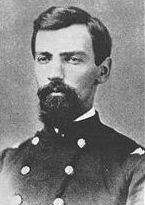

Member of the U.S. House of Representatives from Ohio's 15th district
- In office March 4, 1881 – March 3, 1883
- Preceded by: George W. Geddes
- Succeeded by: Adoniram J. Warner

Personal details
- Born: Rufus Dawes; July 4, 1838 Malta, Ohio, U.S.
- Died: August 1, 1899 (aged 61) Marietta, Ohio, U.S.
- Resting place: Oak Grove Cemetery; Marietta, Ohio
- Party: Republican
- Spouse: Mary Beman Gates
- Children: Charles Gates Dawes^{(b. 1865; died 1951)}; Rufus Cutler Dawes^{(b. 1867; died 1940)}; Beman Gates Dawes^{(b. 1870; died 1953)}; Mary Frances (Beach)^{(b. 1872; died 1956)}; Henry May Dawes^{(b. 1877; died 1952)}; 1 other
- Relatives: Ephraim C. Dawes (brother)
- Education: Marietta College

Military service
- Allegiance: United States of America; Union
- Branch/service: United States Army; Union Army
- Years of service: 1861–1864
- Rank: Colonel, USV; Brevet Brig. General, USV
- Commands: 6th Reg. Wis. Vol. Infantry
- Battles/wars: American Civil War: Northern Virginia campaign (Maj., 6th Wis.); First Battle of Rappahannock Station; Second Battle of Bull Run; Maryland campaign (Maj., 6th Wis.); Battle of South Mountain; Battle of Antietam (Took command, 6th Wis.); Fredericksburg campaign (Maj., 6th Wis.); Battle of Fredericksburg; Mud March; Chancellorsville campaign (Lt.Col., 6th Wis.); Battle of Chancellorsville; Gettysburg campaign (Lt.Col., in command, 6th Wis.); Battle of Gettysburg; Bristoe campaign (Lt.Col., 6th Wis.); Battle of Mine Run (Lt.Col., 6th Wis.); Overland Campaign (Lt.Col., 6th Wis.); Battle of the Wilderness (Took command, 6th Wis.); Battle of Spotsylvania Court House; Battle of North Anna; Battle of Cold Harbor; Siege of Petersburg (Col., in command, 6th Wis.); Second Battle of Petersburg

Rufus R. Dawes (July 4, 1838 – August 1, 1899) was an American politician, military officer, and author. He served in the U.S. House of Representatives from 1881 to 1883. He was a military officer in the Union Army during the American Civil War. He used the middle initial "R" but had no middle name. He was noted for his service in the famed Iron Brigade, particularly during the Battle of Gettysburg.

He was a post-war businessman, Congressman, and author, and the father of four nationally known sons, one of whom, Charles G. Dawes, won the Nobel Peace Prize and served as Vice President of the United States, and of two daughters. He was himself a great-grandson of William Dawes, who alerted colonial minutemen of the approach of the British Army prior to the Battles of Lexington and Concord at the outset of the American Revolution, and a maternal great-grandson of the Rev. Manasseh Cutler, who was instrumental in adoption of the Northwest Ordinance of 1787, led the formation of the Ohio Company of Associates, and became "Father of Ohio University". He was also one of the founders of Alpha Digamma during his time as a student at Marietta College in 1859.

== Civil War ==
Having migrated to Wisconsin prior to the outbreak of the Civil War, Dawes organized a volunteer company from Juneau County in May, was elected Captain, and appointed as such by the State on May 5, and on July 16, 1861, his Company K was mustered into the 6th Wisconsin Volunteer Infantry for three years service. The regiment served for almost a year in Northern Virginia without seeing major action. In June 1862, Dawes was promoted to major. He served with his regiment at the Second Battle of Bull Run, South Mountain, Antietam, and Fredericksburg. He was in command of the regiment for most of the Battle of Antietam after Lieutenant Colonel Edward S. Bragg was shot and injured. In March 1863, Dawes received a promotion to the rank of lieutenant colonel and served in the Chancellorsville Campaign, leading a river crossing under fire at Fitzhugh's Crossing on April 29.

During the first day of the Battle of Gettysburg on July 1, 1863, Dawes led a counterattack on Confederate Brigadier General Joseph R. Davis's brigade of the 2nd, 11th and 42nd Mississippi Infantry Regiments and the 55th North Carolina Infantry Regiment, many of whom were sheltered in an unfinished railroad cut west of town, and forced the surrender of more than 200 of the Confederate soldiers. He later served that year in the Mine Run Campaign. During a furlough, Dawes returned to Ohio and married Mary Beman Gates (1842–1921), from Marietta, Ohio, on January 18, 1864. Returning to the Army of the Potomac, he served at the Battle of the Wilderness and the Siege of Petersburg. In July 1864, Dawes was offered the full rank of colonel, but declined the promotion. He was mustered out of the army on August 10, 1864, following the Battles of Spotsylvania and Cold Harbor.

On February 24, 1866, President Andrew Johnson nominated Dawes for appointment to the grade of brevet brigadier general of volunteers to rank from March 13, 1865, and the United States Senate confirmed the appointment on April 10, 1866.

In 1888, Dawes became a Companion of the Ohio Commandery of the Military Order of the Loyal Legion of the United States and was assigned insignia number 6327.

Some of Dawes' letters are available to researchers. From his time in the Civil War, Dawes likely suffered from post-traumatic stress disorder, although he was able to cope with the symptoms.

== After the war ==
Dawes returned home to Marietta, Ohio and entered the lumber business. In August of that year, his son Charles Gates Dawes was born, a future vice president of the United States. In July 1867, Rufus C. Dawes was born at the family home. He would become a well-respected businessman and lawyer, being awarded Chicago's Most Distinguished Citizen Award" in 1934. A third son, Beman Gates Dawes, would later serve as a Congressman from Ohio, and Henry May Dawes would be a powerful banker who would serve as Comptroller of the Currency for the United States under Warren G. Harding and Calvin Coolidge. Rufus and Mary Dawes also had two daughters, Mary Frances Dawes Beach and Betsey Dawes Hoyt.

Dawes also served on the Board of Trustees of Marietta College from 1871 until his death, 28 years later. He was also a Trustee for Ohio's Institute for the Deaf and Dumb.

=== Congress ===
Dawes was elected to the U.S. House of Representatives in 1881 as a representative from the 15th Congressional District. A Republican, he served for one term before losing his bid for re-election because he voted against the Chinese Exclusion Act of 1882.

=== Later career ===
In 1890, he published a well-received account of his Civil War career, Service with the 6th Wisconsin Volunteers. This memoir was republished in Madison, Wisconsin by the State Historical Society of Wisconsin for the Wisconsin Civil War Centennial Commission, in 1962. His reputation as an orator and his influential voice for the establishment of diplomatic relations with Persia prompted President William McKinley to offer Dawes the position of Minister to Persia in 1897, a post he declined due to failing health.

=== Death and burial ===
Dawes died two years later, August 1, 1899, in Marietta, Ohio, and was buried in Oak Grove Cemetery, Marietta.

=== Legacy ===
Dawes was elected to Marietta College's Hall of Honor in 2003.

Register of the Commandery of Ohio, from February 7, 1883, to July 31, 1893 https://www.loc.gov/item/18004778/ Joined the Commandery of the State of Ohio Military Order of the Loyal Legion of the United States

== See also ==
- List of American Civil War brevet generals (Union)
- Ephraim C. Dawes, younger brother of Rufus, a major who served under Ulysses S. Grant and William T. Sherman

== Notes ==
Military offices
Preceded by Edward S. Bragg	Command of the 6th Wisconsin Volunteer Infantry Regiment; July 5, 1864 – August 9, 1864	Succeeded by John Azor Kellogg
U.S. House of Representatives
Preceded by George W. Geddes	Member of the U.S. House of Representatives from Ohio's 15th congressional district March 4, 1881 – March 3, 1883	Succeeded by Adoniram J. Warner
