= Mary Bird Lake =

Mary Bird Lake (1728–1796) was an English-born American nurse.

She was born in Bristol, England, in 1728. She married Archibald Lake and moved to Newfoundland. Later, they moved to New York, where Archibald started to work in ship building. Mary Bird Lake had eight children. During the American Revolution, Mary became a Matron of Hospitals and was personally thanked by General George Washington for her care for the wounded.

She moved to Marietta, Ohio in 1789. Mary was the founder of the first Sunday School in the Northwest Territory. This Sunday School was the second one in America. Mary Bird Lake died in 1796 and is buried in Rainbow, Ohio. In 1930, a bronze tablet from the Daughters of the American Revolution was placed on her grave to commemorate her services in the Revolutionary War.
