= H. Clay Van Voorhis =

American politician (1852–1927)

Henry C. Van Voorhis
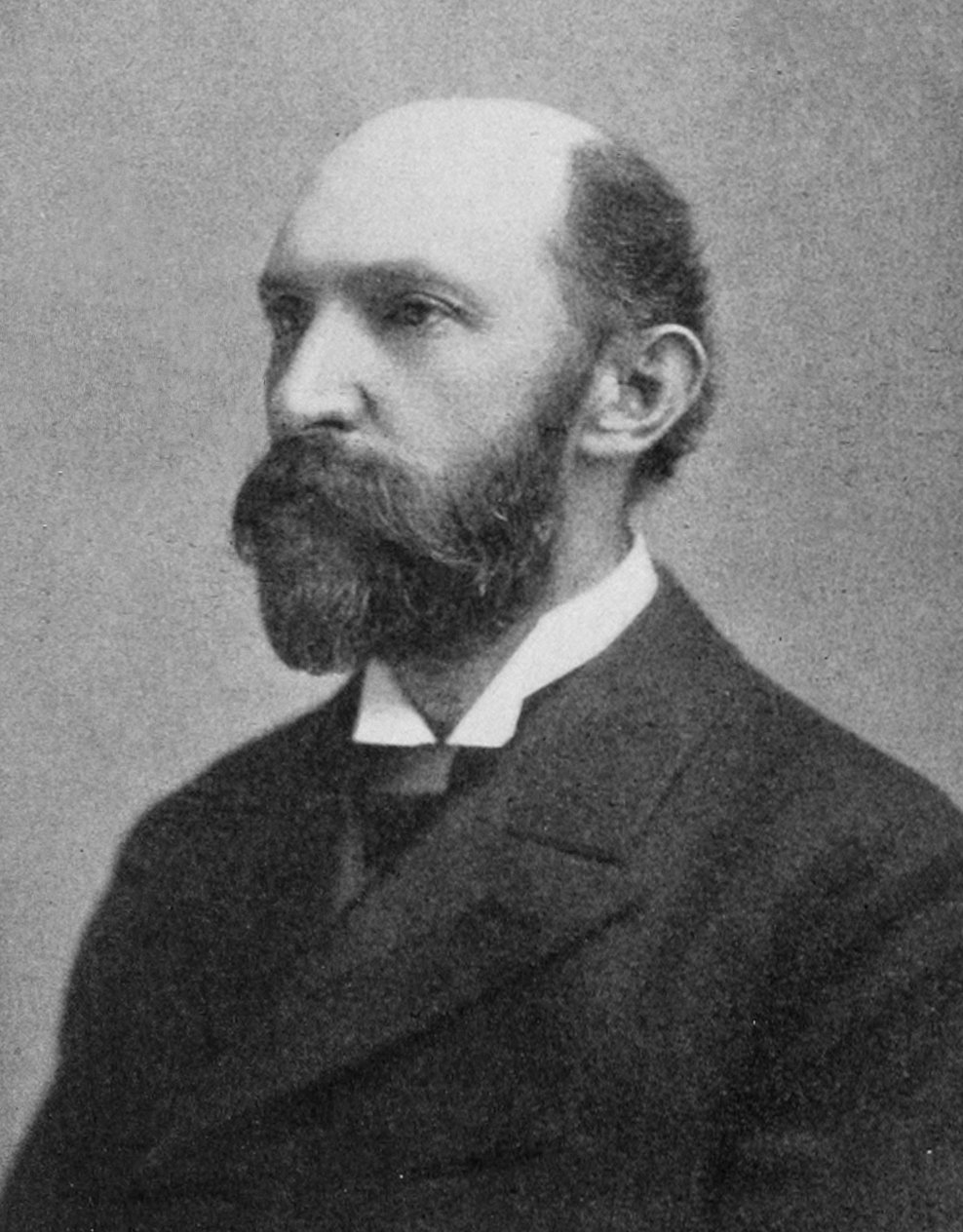

Member of the U.S. House of Representatives from Ohio's 15th district
- In office March 4, 1893 – March 3, 1905
- Preceded by: Michael D. Harter
- Succeeded by: Beman Gates Dawes

Personal details
- Born: Henry Clay Van Voorhis; May 11, 1852 Nashport, Ohio
- Died: December 12, 1927 (aged 75) Zanesville, Ohio
- Resting place: Greenwood Cemetery
- Party: Republican
- Spouse: Mary A. Brown
- Children: five, including Daniel Van Voorhis
- Education: Denison University; Cincinnati Law School

Henry Clay Van Voorhis (May 11, 1852 – December 12, 1927) was an American lawyer and politician. He was a member of the U.S. House of Representatives from Muskingum County, Ohio, serving six terms from 1893 to 1905.

== Early life ==
Van Voorhis was born to Daniel and Jane (Roberts) Van Voorhis in Nashport, Ohio. His father moved to Muskingum Co., Ohio from Washington County, Pennsylvania in 1812 with his parents, and became a member of the Ohio Legislature during the Civil War.

Van Voorhis was educated at Denison University in Granville, Ohio and the University of Cincinnati Law School. In 1873, he moved to Zanesville, the county seat of Muskingum County, Ohio at the junction of the Muskingum and Licking Rivers.

== Career ==
When Van Voorhis moved to Zanesville, he became involved in the Republican Political Committee Organization. He was admitted to the bar in 1874.

In 1885, Van Voorhis became president of Citizens National Bank of Zanesville. In 1892, he was nominated for 53d Congress. He served in 53rd–58th Congresses, for a total of 12 years. During that time, he was a member of the Appropriations Committee.

He relinquished the job as president of the bank between 1892 and 1905, while he was in Congress, and was reelected to the post in 1905.

== Personal life ==
In 1875, he married Mary A. Brown, daughter of Judge William A. and Margaret Brown. They had five children: Ada V., Dollie M. A., TGL Daniel, John A., and Margaret.

He died on December 12, 1927 in Zanesville. He was buried in Greenwood Cemetery.

== See also ==
- Charles Henry Voorhis
- John Van Voorhis

U.S. House of Representatives
Preceded by Michael D. Harter	Member of the U.S. House of Representatives from Ohio's 15th congressional district 1893-1905	Succeeded by Beman G. Dawes
