= Don Drumm (American football) =

American athlete and coach (1887–1968)

Biographical details
- Born: October 24, 1887; Marietta, Ohio, U.S.
- Died: January 9, 1968 (aged 80); Marietta, Ohio, U.S.

Playing career

Football
- 1906–1910: Marietta

Coaching career (HC unless noted)

Football
- 1912–1916: Marietta
- 1919: West Virginia Wesleyan
- 1942: Marietta

Basketball
- 1908–1917: Marietta

Administrative career (AD unless noted)
- 1912–1917: Marietta
- 1919–1920: West Virginia Wesleyan

Head coaching record
- Overall: 37–18–2 (football)

Donald David Drumm (October 24, 1887 – January 9, 1968) was an American college football and college basketball player and coach. Drumm served as the head football coach at Marietta College from 1912 to 1916 and again in 1942 and at West Virginia Wesleyan College in 1919. Drumm died on January 9, 1968, at Memorial Hospital in Marietta, Ohio.

== Head coaching record ==
=== Football ===
Year	Team	Overall	Conference	Standing	Bowl/playoffs
Marietta Pioneers (Independent) (1912–1916)
1912	Marietta	4–4			
1913	Marietta	5–2–1			
1914	Marietta	8–2			
1915	Marietta	6–3–1			
1916	Marietta	7–3			
West Virginia Wesleyan Bobcats (Independent) (1919)
1919	West Virginia Wesleyan	5–4			
West Virginia Wesleyan:		5–4			
Marietta Pioneers (Ohio Athletic Conference) (1942)
1942	Marietta	2–0	1–0	NA	
Marietta:		32–14–2	1–0		
Total:		37–18–2			
