= Wells S. Jones =

American physician, politician, and soldier (1830–1914)

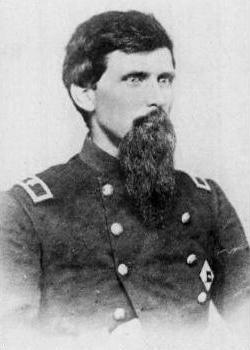
- Born: March 8, 1830; Ross County, Ohio, U.S.
- Died: March 21, 1914 (aged 84); Waverly, Ohio, U.S.
- Burial place: Evergreen-Union Cemetery, Waverly
- Alma mater: Starling Medical College
- Spouse: Mary Frances Molineaux Wetmore
- Children: 1
- Military career
- Rank: Colonel; Brevet Brigadier General
- Commands: 53rd Ohio Infantry
- Conflicts: American Civil War; Battle of Shiloh; Siege of Corinth; Vicksburg Campaign; Siege of Vicksburg; Battle of Missionary Ridge; Atlanta campaign; Battle of Resaca; Battle of Dallas; Battle of Kennesaw Mountain; Battle of Atlanta; Battle of Jonesborough; Sherman's March to the Sea; Battle of Fort McAllister (WIA)
- Other work: Politician; physician

Wells S. Jones (August 3, 1830 – March 21, 1914) was an American physician, politician, and soldier. He served as an infantry officer in the Union Army in the Western Theater during the American Civil War, and was breveted a brigadier general near the end of the conflict. After the war, Jones studied to become a doctor at Starling Medical College, precursor to the Ohio State University College of Medicine.

== Early life ==
Wells S. Jones was born in 1830 in Paxton Township, within Ross County, Ohio.

== Civil War service ==
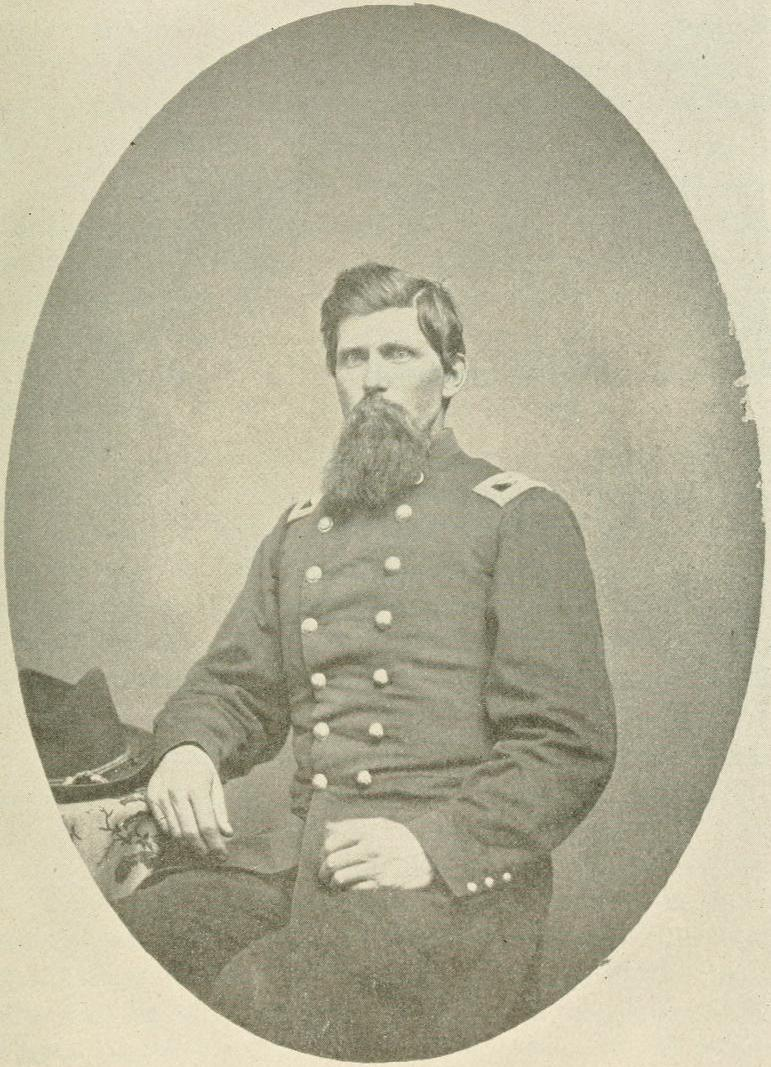
Jones during the American Civil War

When the American Civil War began in 1861 Jones volunteered for service in the Union Army. On October 3 he was elected captain of the 53rd Ohio Infantry Regiment, and saw action as such during the Battle of Shiloh and the Siege of Corinth. On May 2, 1862, Jones became colonel of the 53rd Ohio and its commanding officer. He led his regiment during the Siege of Vicksburg and at the battle of Missionary Ridge, both in 1863. Jones saw further action throughout the 1864 Atlanta campaign, fighting at Resaca, Dallas, Kennesaw Mountain and Atlanta. In August, Jones was appointed to brigade command when his superior officer, Brigadier General Joseph A. J. Lightburn was wounded and relinquished command for the remainder of the war. Colonel Jones now led the 2nd Brigade in William B. Hazen's 2nd Division of the XV Corps at Jonesboro. Coincidentally, the 1st Brigade of that division was also led by another "Colonel Jones", Theodore Jones of the 30th Ohio. Wells Jones participated in the 1864 March to the Sea, and was wounded during operations around Fort McAllister, Georgia, on December 13.

On March 13, 1865, Jones was breveted a brigadier general, cited for "gallant and meritorious services" during the war. He was mustered out of volunteers in the Union Army on August 11.

== Postbellum ==
After the war, Jones attended and graduated from Starling Medical College, Columbus, Ohio, in 1866. He also married Mary Frances Molineaux Wetmore, and the couple had at least one child together, Mary Kathleen born in 1886. Jones died in 1914 at Waverly, Ohio, and was buried in that city's Evergreen-Union Cemetery.
