= Beman Gates Dawes =

American politician

Beman G. Dawes
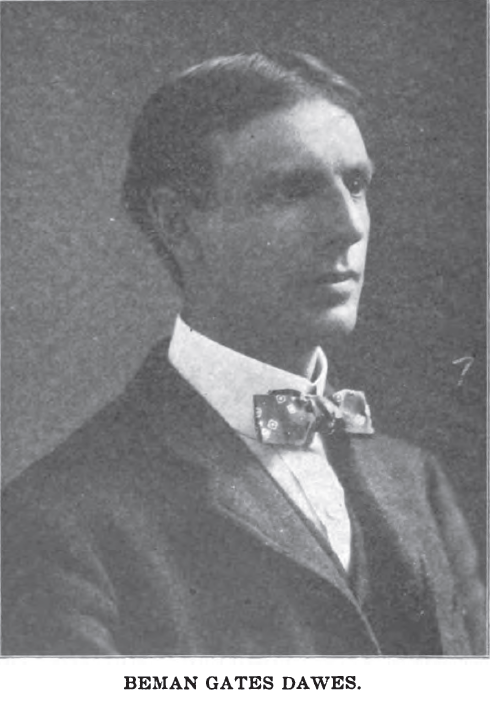

Member of the U.S. House of Representatives from Ohio's 15th district
- In office March 4, 1905 – March 3, 1909
- Preceded by: H. Clay Van Voorhis
- Succeeded by: James Joyce

Personal details
- Born: Beman Gates Dawes; January 14, 1870 Marietta, Ohio, US
- Died: May 15, 1953 (aged 83) Newark, Ohio, US
- Resting place: Dawes Arboretum
- Party: Republican
- Spouse: Bertie Burr
- Parent(s): Rufus Dawes; Mary Beman Gates
- Education: Marietta College

Beman Gates Dawes (January 14, 1870 – May 15, 1953) was a politician and oil executive who served two terms as a Republican congressman from Ohio from 1905 to 1909.

== Biography ==
Dawes, a descendant of American Revolution hero William Dawes and the son of American Civil War Brevet Brigadier General Rufus R. Dawes, was born in Marietta, Ohio. Three brothers also gained international prominence in politics and business: Charles G. Dawes, Rufus C. Dawes, and Henry May Dawes.

=== Early life and education ===
Beman attended the public schools of Marietta and graduated from Marietta College with the Class of 1890. He married Bertie Burr on October 3, 1894. Dawes engaged in agriculture and engineering, and became interested in public utilities.

=== Career ===
He was President of The Ohio River Bridge & Ferry Company in 1903 when the Williamstown–Marietta Bridge was constructed.

==== Congress ====
He served in the U.S. House of Representatives from Ohio's 15th District from 1905 to 1909, the Fifty-ninth and Sixtieth United States Congresses.

=== Later career ===
After his retirement from Congress, Dawes became interested in the production of oil and the building of electric railways. Along with his wife, he founded the Dawes Arboretum, an endowed institution dedicated to the education of youth. In 1914, he was elected president and chairman of the board of directors of the Pure Oil Company.

=== Death ===
Beman Gates Dawes died in Newark, Ohio. His body was entombed in a mausoleum at the Dawes Arboretum.

U.S. House of Representatives
Preceded by H. Clay Van Voorhis	U.S. Representative from Ohio's 15th congressional district 1905-1909	Succeeded by James Joyce
