= Marietta, Ohio =

- City
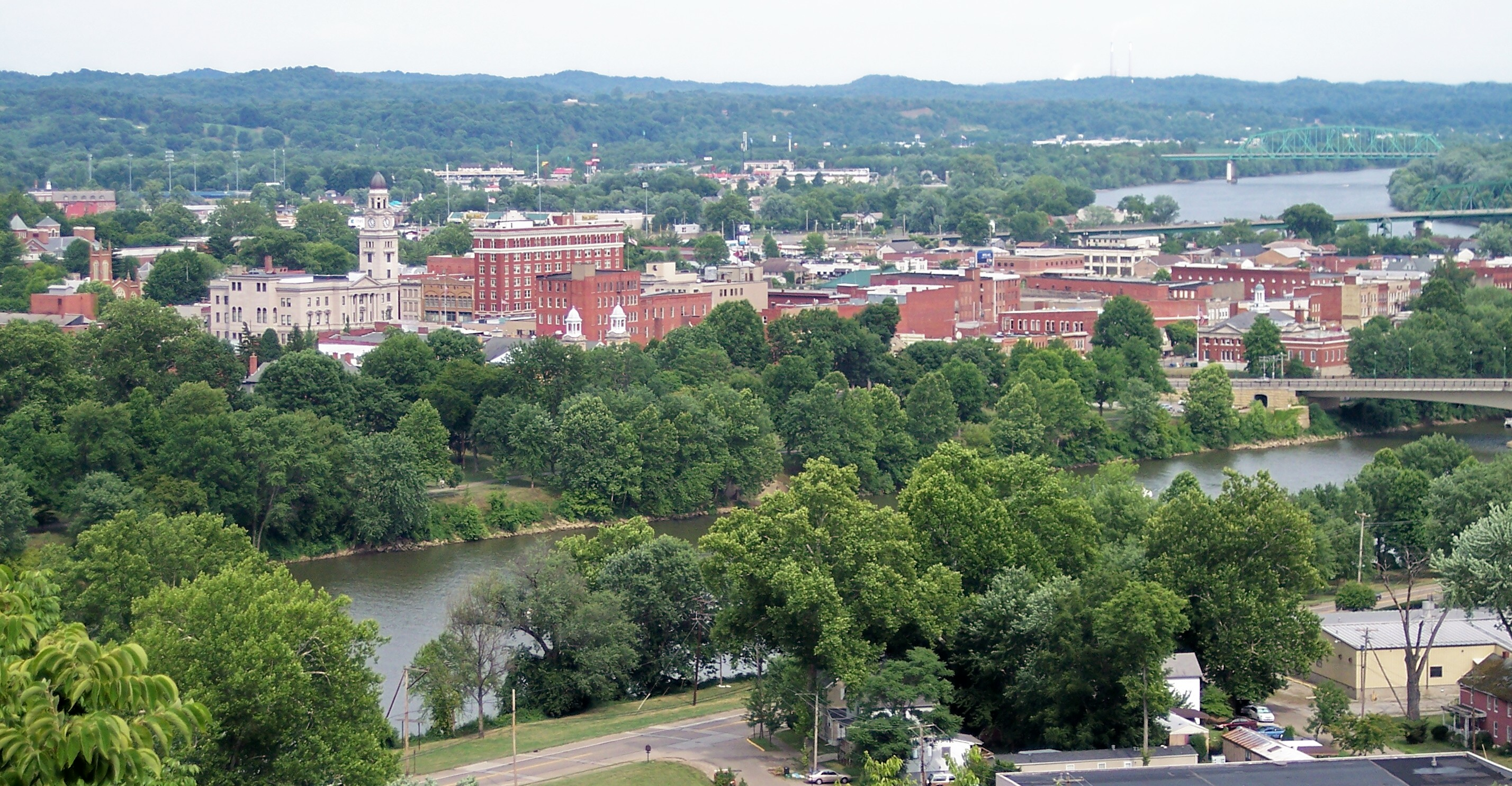
- Downtown Marietta, with Muskingum River in foreground, and Ohio River in background right
- Interactive map of Marietta, Ohio
- Location within Ohio Location within the United States
- Coordinates: 39°25′27″N 81°26′47″W
- Country: United States
- State: Ohio
- County: Washington
- Settled: April 7, 1788
- Incorporated: December 2, 1800
- Named for: Marie Antoinette

Government
  - Type: Mayor-council
  - Mayor: Josh Schlicher (R)

Area
  - Total: 8.75 sq mi (22.66 km^{2})
  - Land: 8.43 sq mi (21.83 km^{2})
  - Water: 0.32 sq mi (0.83 km^{2})
- Elevation: 653 ft (199 m)

Population (2020)
  - Total: 13,385
  - Density: 1,588/sq mi (613.1/km^{2})
- Time zone: UTC-5 (Eastern (EST))
  - Summer (DST): UTC-4 (EDT)
- ZIP code: 45750
- Area codes: 740, 220
- FIPS code: 39-47628
- GNIS feature ID: 1087138
- Website: mariettaohio.gov

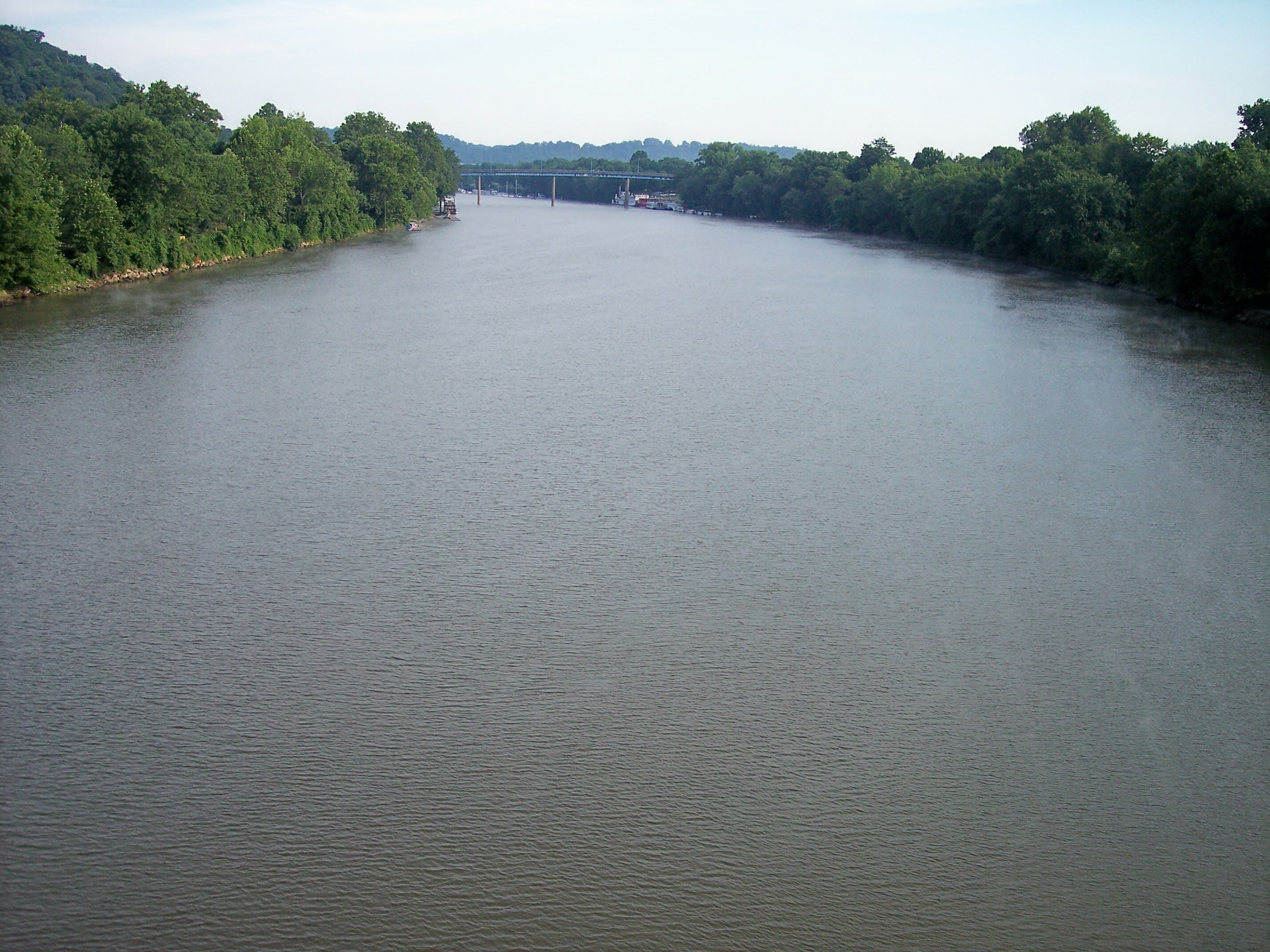
Muskingum River near its mouth in downtown Marietta

Marietta is a city in Washington County, Ohio, United States, and its county seat. It is located in southeastern Ohio at the confluence of the Muskingum and Ohio Rivers, 11 miles (18 km) northeast of Parkersburg, West Virginia. As of the 2020 census, Marietta has a population of 13,385 people. It is the principal city of the Marietta micropolitan area, which includes all of Washington County, and is the second-largest city in the Parkersburg–Marietta–Vienna combined statistical area.

Founded in 1788 by pioneers to the Ohio Country, Marietta was the first permanent U.S. settlement in the newly established Northwest Territory, created in 1787, and what would later become the state of Ohio. It is named after Marie Antoinette, then Queen of France, in honor of French aid in the American Revolution. The area was inhabited by various native tribes of the Hopewell tradition, who built the Marietta Earthworks, a complex more than 1,500 years old, whose Great Mound and other major monuments were preserved by the earliest settlers in parks such as Mound Cemetery. Since 1835 the city has been home to Marietta College, a private, nonsectarian liberal arts school with approximately 1,200 students. Leading up to the American Civil War, the city was a station on the Underground Railroad.

== History ==
=== Prehistoric ===
Succeeding Indigenous cultures lived along the Ohio River and its tributaries for thousands of years. Among them were more than one culture who built earthwork mounds, monuments which generally expressed their cosmology, often with links to astronomical events.

Between 100 BC and AD 500, the Hopewell culture built the multi-earthwork complex on the terrace east of the Muskingum River near its mouth with the Ohio. It is now known as the Marietta Earthworks. Developed over many years, it had a large enclosed square, within which were four platform mounds, used for ceremonial purposes and elite residential; another square, and a larger conical mound used for burials. A walled, graded path led to the river's edge.

=== Settlement ===
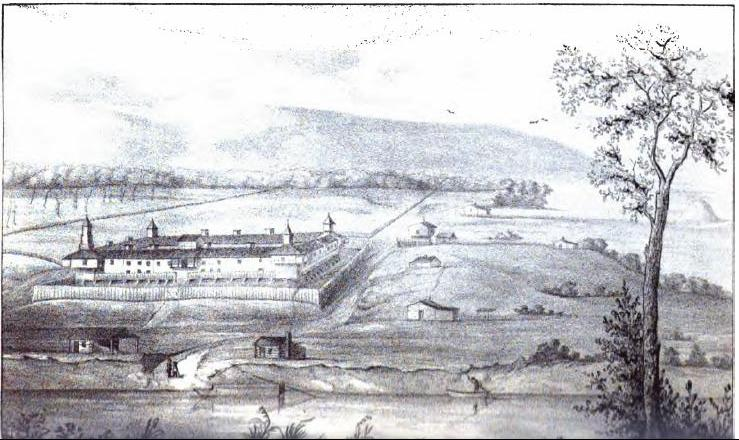
Campus Martius fort at Marietta, with conical Great Mound visible in background to right of tree

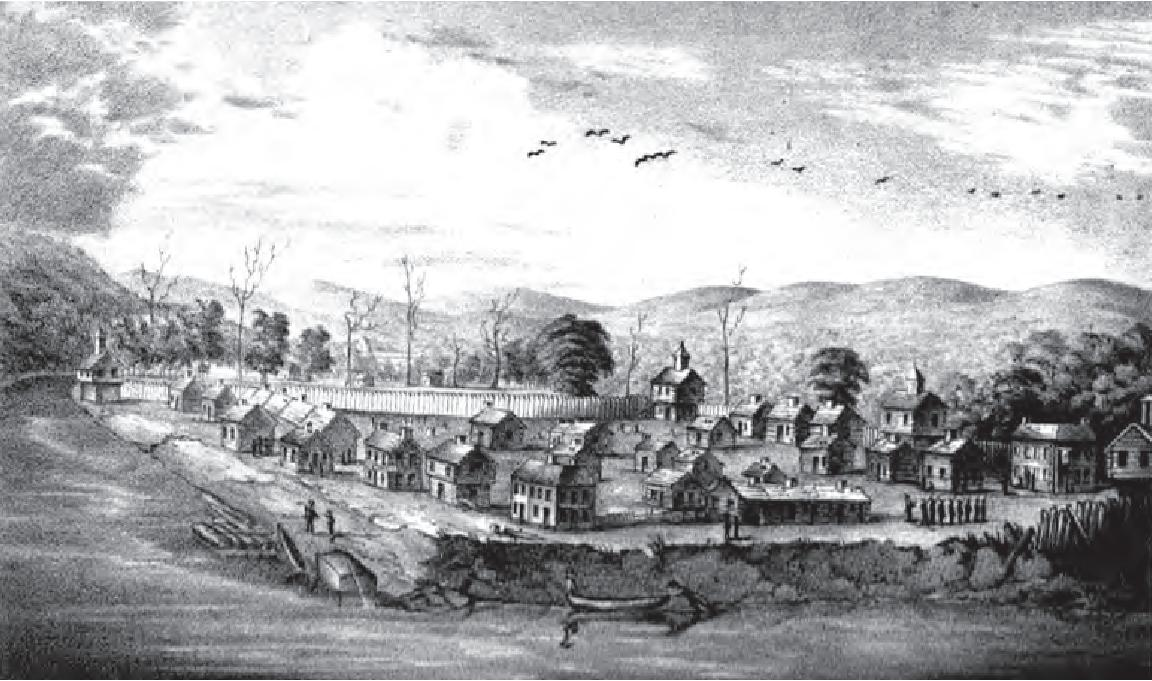
Picketed Point stockade at Marietta

The government of Canada sent Pierre Joseph Céloron de Blainville in a military expedition to this area in the 18th century, and in 1749 the expedition buried six leaden plates to mark their claim to the Ohio Country. They later ceded their territory east of the Mississippi to the British after the French and Indian War. In 1798, one plate was discovered in Marietta and another was discovered near the Kanawha River. The Marietta Plate was replicated for what is known as the French monument which was erected in the 20th century. Before the importance of the plate was recognized, it had been partially destroyed to make musket balls.

In 1770, the future U.S. president George Washington, then a surveyor, began exploring large tracts of land west of his native Virginia. During the Revolutionary War, Washington told his friend General Rufus Putnam of the beauty he had seen in his travels through the Ohio Valley and of his ideas for settling the territory. By 1787, Washington owned 30,000 acres of land on the east side of the Ohio River.

After the American Revolutionary War, the U.S. sold or granted large tracts of land to stimulate development in this area after the Seven Ranges survey was completed in 1780s. Marietta is located just east of the southern terminus of the Seven Ranges. Marietta was founded by settlers from New England who were investors in the Ohio Company of Associates. It was the first of numerous New England settlements in what was then the Northwest Territory. These New Englanders, or "Yankees" as they were called, were descended from the Puritan English colonists who had settled New England in the 1600s and were primarily Congregationalists. The first church constructed in Marietta was a Congregationalist church, founded around 1786. Before the mid-1790s services were held at the fort or in Munsell's Hall at nearby Point Harmar. In 1798 the Muskingum Academy was built on the site of the 19th century Marietta Congregationalist Church. The academy building served both educational and religious purposes.

After the war, the newly formed United States had little cash but plenty of land. Eager to develop additional lands, the new government decided to pay veterans of the Revolution with warrants for land in the Northwest Territory, which was organized under federal authority in 1787 by the Northwest Ordinance. Competing states had agreed to end their claims to the lands; Pennsylvania and Virginia received some lands in a settlement. Arthur St. Clair was appointed by the president as governor of the new territory. He was inaugurated on a site now marked by the Start Westward Memorial.

The Ohio Company of Associates had supported provisions in the ordinance to allow veterans to use their warrants to purchase the land. They bought 1.5 million acres (6,100 km^{2}) of land from Congress. On April 7, 1788, 48 men of the Ohio Company of Associates, led by General Putnam, arrived at the confluence of the Muskingum and Ohio rivers. The location was selected because an earlier survey done by geographer Thomas Hutchins had recommended the confluence of these two rivers as "the best part of the whole of the western country." The site was on the east side of the Muskingum River, across from Fort Harmar, a military outpost built three years prior.

Bringing with them the first government sanctioned by the US for this area, they established the first permanent United States settlement in the Northwest Territory. (Older European settlements in the Northwest Territory region include Sault Ste. Marie, Michigan, 1668; Cahokia, Illinois, 1696, Detroit, 1701; Kaskaskia, Illinois, 1703, Ouiatenon, Indiana, 1717, Prairie du Rocher, Illinois, 1720; Vincennes, Indiana, 1732, Clarksville, Indiana, 1783, Martin's Ferry, Ohio, 1785, Fort Finney/Jeffersonville, Indiana, 1786, most settled by ethnic French colonists from Canada.) The Americans named Marietta in honor of Marie Antoinette, the Queen of France, who had aided the colonies in their battle for independence from Great Britain.

The settlers immediately started construction of two forts: Campus Martius, whose former site is now occupied by the museum of the same name, and Picketed Point Stockade, at the confluence of the Muskingum and Ohio rivers. At the same time, the settlers started developing their community, platted according to plans they had made in Boston.

In 1788, George Washington said:

No colony in America was ever settled under such favorable auspices as that which has just commenced at the Muskingum. ... If I was a young man, just preparing to begin the world, or if advanced in life and had a family to make provision for, I know of no country where I should rather fix my habitation....

The families of the settlers began arriving within a few months. By the end of 1788, 137 people populated the area.

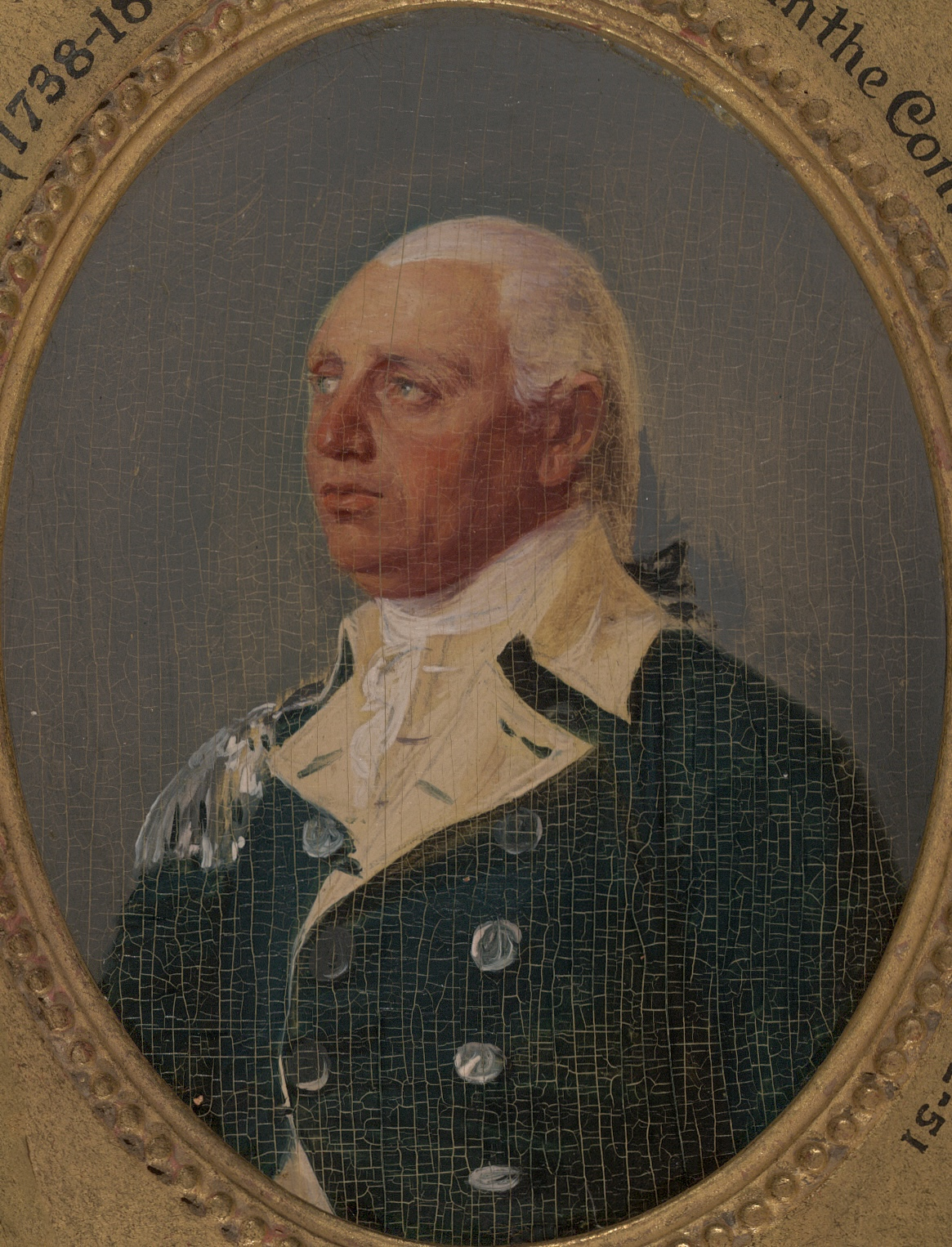
Rufus Putnam was George Washington's chief engineer. After the Revolutionary War, he led the first settlers to Marietta, erected the Campus Martius fort, and established the Northwest Territory as free soil - no slavery.

In 1789, the United States signed the Treaty of Fort Harmar with several Indigenous tribes that occupied areas of the Northwest Territory, to settle issues related to trade, as well as the boundary between their lands and United States settlement. The US did not address the Indigenous people's major grievance about American settlers moving into their lands, particularly in the Western Reserve, where there were disputes over land. Although Congress authorized Governor Arthur St. Clair to give land back to the Indigenous people, he did not do so. Conflict increased as the Indigenous people tried to push the settlers out. After years of warfare in the region, they were defeated. The US signed the Treaty of Greenville (1795) with the Indigenous people, which secured the safety of settlers to leave the forts and develop their farms.

The settlers held services regularly and chartered the first church in 1799. It was a Congregational institution; its charter was unusually inclusive due to the varied religious backgrounds of its members. The congregation constructed the first church building in 1807. The original church burned in 1905 and another constructed in its place in 1906. The church, First Congregational Church United Church of Christ, is the longest continuously worshiping congregation west of the Alleghenies.

Education was important to the settlers, many of whom had been officers during the Revolution. During that first winter, they began a basic school for the children at Campus Martius. In 1797, settlers founded Muskingum Academy. The town had numerous abolitionists, and Ephraim Cutler was instrumental as a state delegate in 1802 at the state convention in swaying the vote for the state to be free of slavery.

=== 19th century ===
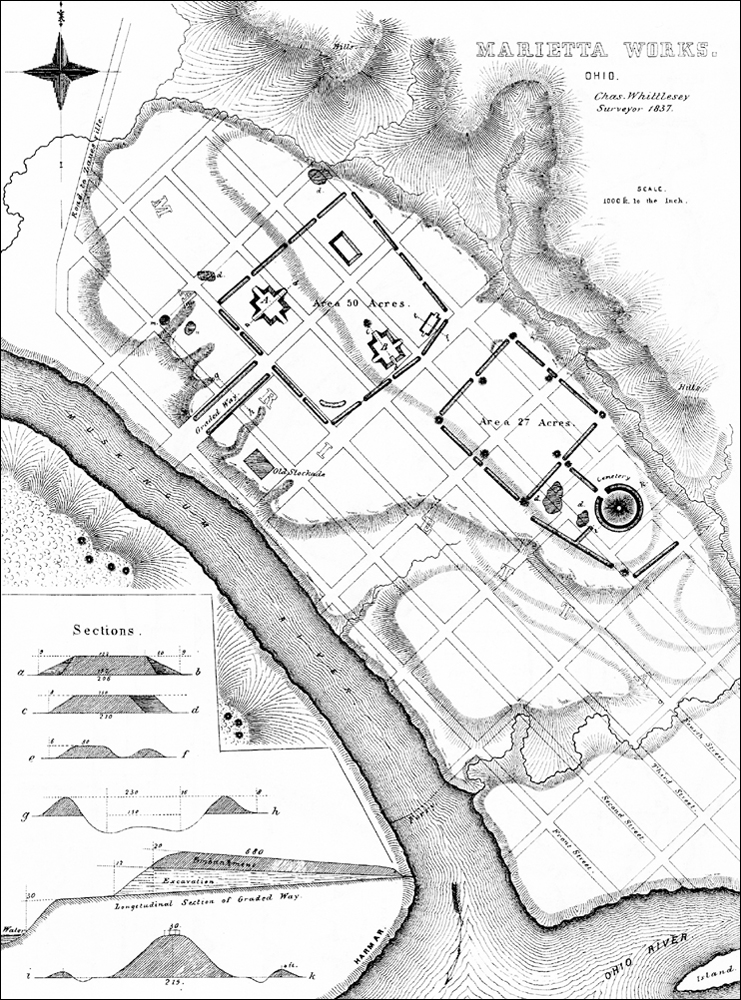
1837 Survey of Marietta Earthworks

Townspeople organized and chartered Marietta College in 1835. It was used as a station on the Underground Railroad to help slaves escape from the South.

The settlers preserved the Great Mound, or Conus, by planning their own cemetery around it. They also preserved the two largest platform mounds, which they called Capitolinus and Quadrophenus. The former was developed as the site for the city library. As of 1900, the Mound Cemetery had the highest number of burials of Revolutionary War officers in the nation, indicating the nature of the generation that settled Marietta.

Marietta's location on two major navigable rivers made it ideal for industry and commerce. Boat building was one of the early industries. Artisans built oceangoing vessels and sailed them downriver to the Mississippi River and south to New Orleans and the Gulf of Mexico. In less than two decades after settlement, the steamboat had been developed, and was also constructed here. Brick factories and sawmills supplied materials for homes and public buildings. An iron mill, along with several foundries, provided rails for the growing railroad industry; the Marietta Chair Factory made furniture.

Interest in the prehistoric culture that built the Marietta Earthworks continued. The complex was surveyed and drawn by Ephraim George Squier and Edwin Hamilton Davis, whose large project on numerous prehistoric mounds throughout the Ohio and Mississippi valleys was published by the Smithsonian Institution in 1848 as Ancient Monuments of the Mississippi Valley. It was the first book published by the Smithsonian. Their drawing above shows the plan of the original complex, which "included a large square enclosure surrounding four flat-topped pyramidal mounds, another smaller square, and a circular enclosure with a large burial mound at its center." The walled, graded path, called by the settlers the Sacra Via, led from the largest enclosure to the lower river's edge. This pathway was destroyed in 1843 during mid-nineteenth century development.

=== Railroads and oil ===
Local development began with the Belpre and Cincinnati Railroad (B&C); it was founded in 1845. It was intended to connect from Belpre, Ohio, the next town downriver, to a planned Baltimore and Ohio Railroad (B&O) spur to Parkersburg. But, for years, the Virginia government did not allow the B&O to construct track south of Wheeling. In 1851 developers changed the Ohio state terminus to Marietta and changed the name of the railroad to the Marietta and Cincinnati Railroad (M&C) that year. The right-of-way for an alternate connection to the B&O extended upriver from Marietta to Bellaire, Ohio. The M&C was bankrupt by 1857, but construction of track continued west to reach Cincinnati. The first through-train from Cincinnati ran on April 9, 1857. The M&C got out of bankruptcy in 1860.

In 1871, the Ohio Valley Railroad was formed and for the next two years built tracks going north for 103 miles. Their home office was in Marietta, with treasurer offices in Pittsburgh. The Ohio Valley railroad was reorganized as the Marietta and Cleveland. The Pennsylvania Railroad in its expansion later purchased the railroad and its right-of-way between Marietta and Bellaire.

Passengers traveling between Marietta and Parkersburg, Virginia, (now West Virginia) had to take a steamboat for the 14 miles between the two towns and transfer. With help from the B&O and the Baltimore City Council, the Union Railroad finally connected Marietta to Belpre, Ohio, in 1860. Later absorbed by the B&O, this section of track is still in operation as of 2026. The tracks are currently being leased to the Belpre Industrial Parkersburg Railroad.

The planned bridge from Parkersburg across the Ohio River to Belpre was finally built 1868–1870 by the B&O, as part of its main line from Baltimore to St. Louis, Missouri. This cut Marietta off from traffic and trade, although it retained local and Ohio service. In the early 20th century, 24 passenger trains served Marietta each day, most of which ran on the PRR tracks.

William P. Cutler was a major figure in the M&C. He also backed the Union Railroad and the Marietta, Columbus and Cleveland Railroad, among other local railroads. Cutler served as General Manager and as President of the M&C for many years.

In 1860, oil was first drilled in the Marietta region. Oil booms in 1875 and 1910 made investors rich, who constructed numerous lavish houses in town, of which many still stand. The Dawes brothers of Marietta founded the Pure Oil Company. All four brothers became nationally prominent businessmen or politicians: Charles Gates Dawes, Rufus C. Dawes, Beman Gates Dawes and Henry May Dawes. Charles Dawes was elected in 1924 with President Calvin Coolidge to serve as the 30th Vice President of the United States (1925–1929). In 1925, he shared the Nobel Peace Prize, based on his work on the Dawes Plan and relieving an international crisis in 1923 related to German reparations after World War I.

In 1880, the first Putnam Street Bridge was opened to connect Marietta to Fort Harmar. It provided the first free crossing of the Muskingum River.

=== 20th century ===
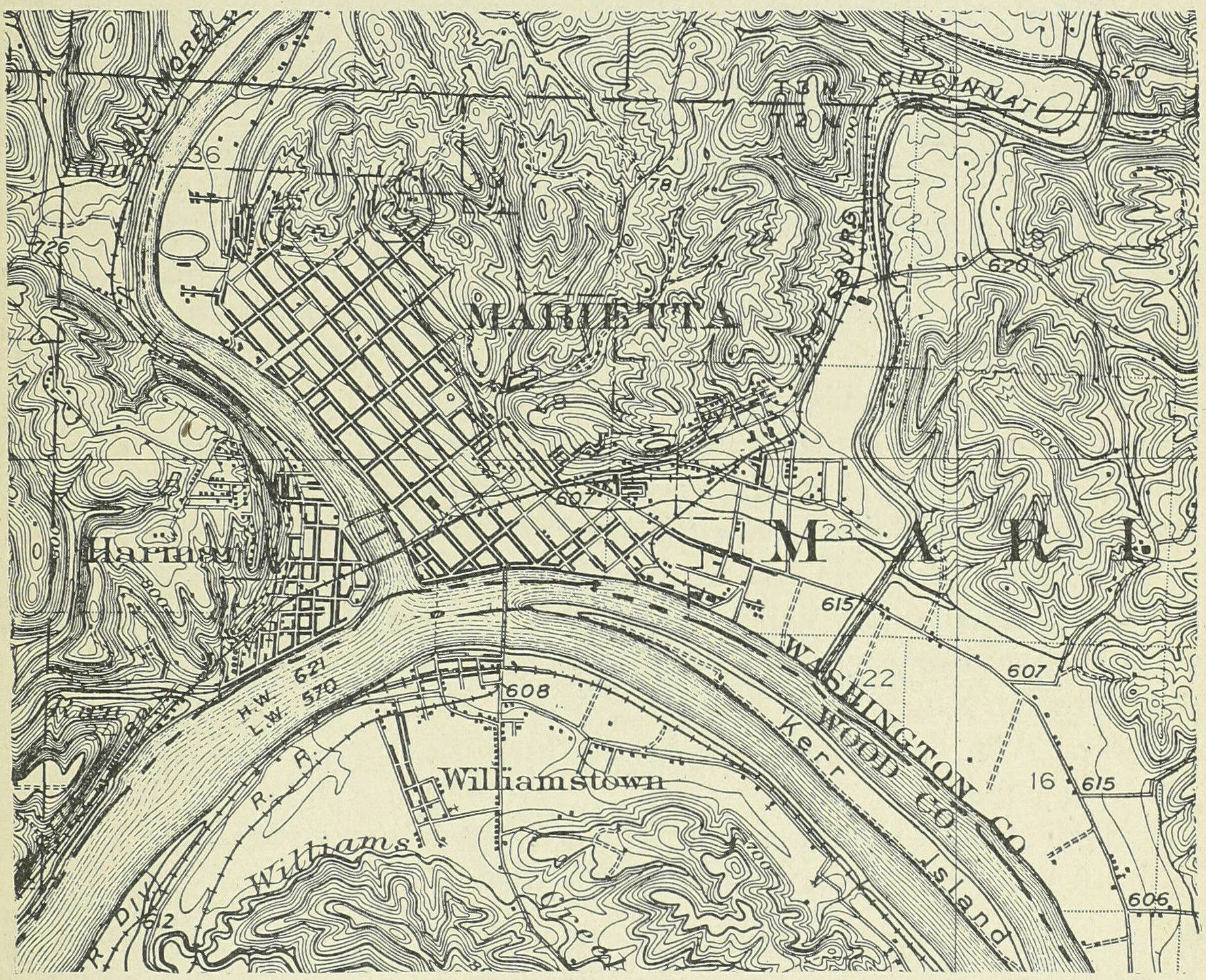
Map of Marietta, 1923

As transportation advanced along railroads and highways, Marietta was initially passed by. From 1868 to 1870, the Baltimore and Ohio Railroad built a bridge to connect Parkersburg, West Virginia, and Belpre; and the National Road went further north through Zanesville. The Pennsylvania Railroad expanded in the late 19th century and had a station in Marietta, running 26 daily trains between Marietta and Pittsburgh. In 1917, a group of 23 young men organized the Marietta College Ambulance Unit, which went on to serve in France, landing at Bordeaux in June; four died in battle. A plaque was given by the government of France to the city of Marietta and dedicated to the Marietta College Ambulance Unit in 1939, during the Northwest Territory Sesquicentennial Celebration. In 1939, the Sons and Daughters of Pioneer Rivermen was established in Marietta during the Great Depression to celebrate the city's substantial river history and its people. Two years later the Ohio River Museum was opened. After World War II, passenger service decreased as the railroads restructured and the federal government invested in highway construction. The last rail passenger service ended in 1953. Marietta was relatively isolated from new travel routes until 1967, when I-77 was opened with close access to the city.

The 2016 Ohio State of the State address by governor John Kasich was held at People's Bank Theater on April 6.

== Geography ==
According to the U.S. Census Bureau, the city has a total area of 8.75 square miles (22.66 km^{2}), of which 8.43 square miles (21.83 km^{2}) is land and 0.32 square miles (0.83 km^{2}) is water.

The Muskingum River and Duck Creek flow into the Ohio River at Marietta. The area is part of the Appalachian Plateau which covers the eastern half of Ohio. The Appalachian Plateau consists of steep hills and valleys and is the most rugged area in the state. The area is within the ecoregion of the Western Allegheny Plateau. This portion of the state has some of Ohio's most abundant mineral deposits.

Marietta was affected by the Great Flood of 1913.

=== Climate ===
The climate in this area is characterized by humid summers, cold winters, and evenly distributed precipitation throughout the year that can not be accurately predicted because of the amount of water in the Ohio Valley. According to the Köppen Climate Classification system, Marietta has a Humid continental climate, abbreviated "Dfa" on climate maps.

Climate data for Marietta, Ohio (1991–2020 normals, extremes 1893–present)
Month	Jan	Feb	Mar	Apr	May	Jun	Jul	Aug	Sep	Oct	Nov	Dec	Year
Record high °F (°C)	77 (25)	78 (26)	89 (32)	96 (36)	99 (37)	100 (38)	105 (41)	106 (41)	104 (40)	93 (34)	86 (30)	78 (26)	106 (41)
Mean maximum °F (°C)	64.8 (18.2)	66.8 (19.3)	75.8 (24.3)	83.1 (28.4)	88.1 (31.2)	91.9 (33.3)	93.5 (34.2)	92.5 (33.6)	90.4 (32.4)	82.7 (28.2)	74.2 (23.4)	65.2 (18.4)	94.5 (34.7)
Mean daily maximum °F (°C)	39.5 (4.2)	42.9 (6.1)	52.8 (11.6)	65.6 (18.7)	74.5 (23.6)	81.8 (27.7)	85.3 (29.6)	84.6 (29.2)	78.7 (25.9)	66.6 (19.2)	54.0 (12.2)	43.7 (6.5)	64.2 (17.9)
Daily mean °F (°C)	31.1 (−0.5)	33.5 (0.8)	41.9 (5.5)	53.2 (11.8)	63.2 (17.3)	71.4 (21.9)	75.3 (24.1)	74.0 (23.3)	67.4 (19.7)	55.2 (12.9)	43.9 (6.6)	35.9 (2.2)	53.8 (12.1)
Mean daily minimum °F (°C)	22.7 (−5.2)	24.2 (−4.3)	30.9 (−0.6)	40.8 (4.9)	51.9 (11.1)	60.9 (16.1)	65.3 (18.5)	63.4 (17.4)	56.1 (13.4)	43.8 (6.6)	33.8 (1.0)	28.0 (−2.2)	43.5 (6.4)
Mean minimum °F (°C)	3.3 (−15.9)	7.2 (−13.8)	15.3 (−9.3)	27.0 (−2.8)	36.7 (2.6)	47.2 (8.4)	54.7 (12.6)	52.7 (11.5)	42.3 (5.7)	30.7 (−0.7)	20.0 (−6.7)	11.9 (−11.2)	0.5 (−17.5)
Record low °F (°C)	−23 (−31)	−22 (−30)	−6 (−21)	11 (−12)	24 (−4)	34 (1)	44 (7)	38 (3)	30 (−1)	17 (−8)	1 (−17)	−11 (−24)	−23 (−31)
Average precipitation inches (mm)	3.49 (89)	3.14 (80)	3.98 (101)	3.98 (101)	4.35 (110)	4.87 (124)	4.79 (122)	3.60 (91)	3.39 (86)	3.16 (80)	2.91 (74)	3.61 (92)	45.27 (1,150)
Average snowfall inches (cm)	7.2 (18)	4.0 (10)	2.7 (6.9)	0.1 (0.25)	0.0 (0.0)	0.0 (0.0)	0.0 (0.0)	0.0 (0.0)	0.0 (0.0)	0.0 (0.0)	0.2 (0.51)	2.1 (5.3)	16.3 (41)
Average precipitation days (≥ 0.01 in)	15.0	13.3	14.0	13.9	14.3	12.7	12.4	10.1	9.6	11.0	11.6	14.0	151.9
Average snowy days (≥ 0.1 in)	4.0	3.0	1.6	0.1	0.0	0.0	0.0	0.0	0.0	0.0	0.3	2.6	11.6
Source: NOAA

=== Environmental issues ===
Eramet has released thousands of pounds of manganese and other hazardous air pollutants into the air.

== Demographics ==
Historical population
Census	Pop.	Note	%±
1800	321		—
1810	463		44.2%
1820	746		61.1%
1830	1,207		61.8%
1840	1,814		50.3%
1850	3,175		75.0%
1860	4,323		36.2%
1870	5,218		20.7%
1880	5,444		4.3%
1890	8,273		52.0%
1900	13,348		61.3%
1910	12,923		−3.2%
1920	15,140		17.2%
1930	14,285		−5.6%
1940	14,543		1.8%
1950	16,006		10.1%
1960	16,847		5.3%
1970	16,861		0.1%
1980	16,467		−2.3%
1990	15,026		−8.8%
2000	14,515		−3.4%
2010	14,085		−3.0%
2020	13,385		−5.0%

=== 2020 census ===
As of the 2020 census, Marietta had a population of 13,385. The median age was 39.4 years, 18.2% of residents were under the age of 18, and 20.1% of residents were 65 years of age or older. For every 100 females there were 91.1 males, and for every 100 females age 18 and over there were 89.0 males age 18 and over.

99.5% of residents lived in urban areas, while 0.5% lived in rural areas.

There were 5,758 households in Marietta, of which 23.7% had children under the age of 18 living in them. Of all households, 34.0% were married-couple households, 22.4% were households with a male householder and no spouse or partner present, and 34.6% were households with a female householder and no spouse or partner present. About 39.5% of all households were made up of individuals and 16.9% had someone living alone who was 65 years of age or older.

There were 6,472 housing units, of which 11.0% were vacant. The homeowner vacancy rate was 1.8% and the rental vacancy rate was 8.2%.

Racial composition as of the 2020 census
Race	Number	Percent
White	12,140	90.7%
Black or African American	200	1.5%
American Indian and Alaska Native	40	0.3%
Asian	153	1.1%
Native Hawaiian and Other Pacific Islander	3	0.0%
Some other race	140	1.0%
Two or more races	709	5.3%
Hispanic or Latino (of any race)	283	2.1%

=== 2010 census ===
As of the 2010 census, there were 14,085 people, 5,828 households, and 3,215 families residing in the city. The population density was 1,670.8 inhabitants per square mile (645.1/km^{2}). There were 6,519 housing units at an average density of 773.3 per square mile (298.6/km^{2}). The racial makeup of the city was 94.9% White, 1.3% African American, 0.3% Native American, 1.4% Asian, 0.5% from other races, and 1.5% from two or more races. Hispanic or Latino of any race were 1.1% of the population.

There were 5,828 households, of which 25.3% had children under the age of 18 living with them, 37.9% were married couples living together, 13.0% had a female householder with no husband present, 4.3% had a male householder with no wife present, and 44.8% were non-families. 37.4% of all households were made up of individuals, and 15.7% had someone living alone who was 65 years of age or older. The average household size was 2.14 and the average family size was 2.80.

The median age in the city was 39 years. 18.9% of residents were under the age of 18; 16% were between the ages of 18 and 24; 21.1% were from 25 to 44; 25.7% were from 45 to 64; and 18.4% were 65 years of age or older. The gender makeup of the city was 46.9% male and 53.1% female.

== Economy ==
Sewah Studios, a producer of historical markers, was founded in Marietta in 1927. The company produced the United States' first aluminum historical markers, and currently produces about 1,200 markers per year for historical societies across the country.

Marietta is home to one of the longest-running ferromanganese refinery in North America, Eramet Marietta Industries Inc., a global leaders in manganese emissions.

== Arts and culture ==
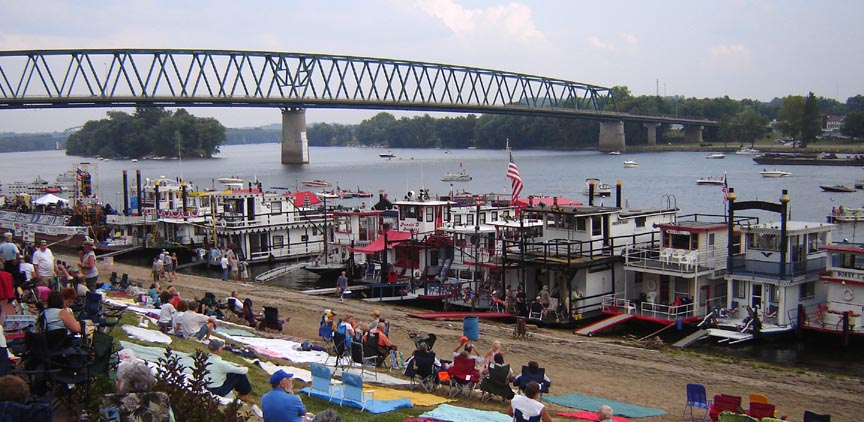
Ohio River Sternwheel Festival

The annual Ohio River Sternwheel Festival was founded in 1976, and features Sternwheeler ships gathering on the Ohio River in Marietta. The event attracts an estimated 100,000 attendees per year. Other boating events include the Ralph Lindamood Memorial Regatta, the Marietta Invitational Regatta, and the "Head of the Muskingum".

A Marietta Civil War Reenactment is held annually, and features Union and Confederate reenactors battling across the Muskingum River. Goodfest is a music festival held at Goodfellows Park.

In 2023, Marietta installed a gallery of public murals by local artists, which reflected Marietta's history.

=== Library ===
Marietta has a public library, a branch of the Washington County Public Library.

== Government ==
Marietta uses a mayor-council government. The mayor is a full-time position; the seven city council members and the city council president are all part-time positions. The mayor is Joshua Schlicher.

Marietta is represented by Republican Kevin Ritter (District 94) in the Ohio House of Representatives, and by Republican Brian Chavez (District 30) in the Ohio Senate. Marietta falls within Ohio's 6th congressional district, which is currently represented by Republican Michael Rulli.

== Education ==
As of 2021, the Marietta City School District operates three elementary schools and one building that houses a middle/high school, Marietta High School.

Marietta College and Washington State College of Ohio are both located in Marietta.

== Transportation ==
Interstate 77 runs east of Marietta connecting it to Cleveland, Ohio, to the north and Charleston, West Virginia, to the south. Six state routes run through Marietta. These are: Ohio State Route 7, Ohio State Route 60, Ohio State Route 26, Ohio State Route 550, Ohio State Route 676, and Ohio State Route 821.

Marietta is served by Mid-Ohio Valley Regional Airport in Williamstown, West Virginia, which has three flights a day Monday through Friday from Charlotte Douglas International Airport.

Marietta's River Trail bike path is a two lane, paved trail that spans over four miles. While built for cycling, it is heavily used by pedestrians as well. The trail runs along the Ohio and Muskingum rivers and connects various points of interest throughout Marietta, including downtown and multiple parks.

== Notable people ==
Notable people on the list of early settlers of Marietta, Ohio include: Arthur St. Clair, the 9th President of the Congress of the Confederation who later was the first governor of the Northwest Territory; Gen. Rufus Putnam, Gen. Benjamin Tupper, Gen. James Varnum, Gen. Samuel Holden Parsons, Commodore Abraham Whipple, Col. William Stacy, and Griffin Greene.

Other notable people include:

- Levi Barber, politician, president of the Bank of Marietta
- Dewey F. Bartlett, politician, born in Marietta in 1919
- Zak Boggs, soccer player, born in Marietta in 1986
- Hobart Bosworth, actor, director, writer, and producer, born in Marietta in 1867
- John Brough, politician, born in Marietta in 1811
- Clem S. Clarke, politician, born in Marietta in 1897
- William P. Cutler, politician, died in Marietta in 1889
- Charles G. Dawes, 30th Vice President of the United States, born in Marietta in 1865
- Rufus Dawes, politician, died in Marietta in 1899
- Charles H. Elston, politician, born in Marietta in 1891
- Althea Flynt, pornographic model, born in Marietta in 1952
- Marion Havighurst, poet, novelist, and children's author, born in Marietta in 1894
- Samuel Prescott Hildreth, pioneer physician, scientist, and historian, died in Marietta in 1863
- Nancy Hollister, first female governor of Ohio, former mayor of Marietta
- Bill Johnson, politician, president of Youngstown State University
- Perley Brown Johnson, politician, born in Marietta in 1798
- Mary Bird Lake, the town's first Sunday school teacher
- Alf Landon, politician, raised in Marietta
- Francis Butler Loomis, 25th United States Assistant Secretary of State, born in Marietta in 1861
- Return Jonathan Meigs Jr., politician, died in Marietta in 1825
- Robert Oliver, politician, died in Marietta in 1810 or 1811
- C. William O'Neill, politician, born in Marietta in 1916
- Harrison Gray Otis, publisher of the Los Angeles Times, born near Marietta in 1837
- Greg Pryor, professional baseball infielder, born in Marietta in 1949
- Lilly Martin Spencer, painter, lived in Marietta
- Eliza M. Chandler White, charity work leader and clubwoman, born in Marietta in 1831
- George White, politician, settled in Marietta by 1902
- William A. Whittlesey, politician, moved to Marietta in 1821
- Warner Wing, politician, born in Marietta in 1805
- Chief Zimmer, professional baseball catcher and manager, born in Marietta in 1860

== Sister cities ==
- Gautier, Mississippi
- Rutland, Massachusetts

== See also ==
- List of cities and towns along the Ohio River
- List of mayors of Marietta, Ohio
- Washington State Community College
- Marietta College

== Sources ==
- McCullough, David (2019). The Pioneers: The Heroic Story of the Settlers who Brought the American Ideal West. New York: Simon & Schuster. ISBN 978-1501168680.
