= John G. Walsh =

American economist (born 1950)

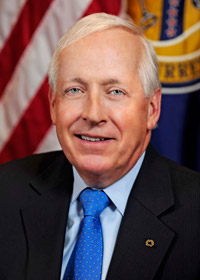

Acting Comptroller of the Currency
- In office August 15, 2010 – April 9, 2012
- President: Barack Obama
- Preceded by: John Dugan
- Succeeded by: Thomas J. Curry

Personal details
- Born: September 6, 1950 (age 76) Baltimore, Maryland, United States
- Education: University of Notre Dame (B.A.); Kennedy School of Government (M.P.P.)

John G. Walsh (born September 9, 1950) is an American economist who was the acting Comptroller of the Currency from 2010 until 2012. He had been Chief of Staff and Public Affairs at the office since October 2005 and became interim Comptroller on August 15, 2010, following John Dugan. He ceased being interim Comptroller with the April 9, 2012 swearing-in of Thomas J. Curry as the 30th Comptroller of the Currency.

Walsh was born in Baltimore in 1950. He has previously served as the executive director of the Group of 30, a nonprofit consultative group that studies international economic and monetary affairs. He has served on the staff of the Senate Banking Committee from 1986 to 1992 and as an International Economist for the US Treasury Department from 1984 to 1986. He has also been an International Program Analyst at the Office of Management and Budget, has worked with the Mutual Broadcasting System, and served in the U.S. Peace Corps in Ghana.

== Career at the OCC ==
The OCC's main tasks under Walsh's leadership have been:

- Continued supervision of the national banking system as the country emerges from recession
- Implementation of the Dodd-Frank Wall Street Reform and Consumer Protection Act's new requirements, including the transfer of the Office of Thrift Supervision's functions into the OCC
- Completion of the Basel III capital accord

== Controversial issues ==
On June 21, 2011, Walsh spoke before the Centre for the Study of Financial Innovation in London, warning about the dangers of excessive financial regulation. He called it a "swinging pendulum problem" and expressed his view that "we are in danger of trying to squeeze too much risk and complexity out of banking as we institute reforms to address problems and abuses stemming from the last crisis".

The following day, three senators – Jack Reed (D-RI), Carl Levin (D-MI), and Jeff Merkley (D-OR) – called for a "fundamental rethink of the OCC's leadership" arguing that Walsh "is not interested in leading an agency charged with ensuring the safety and soundness of our financial institutions".

The OCC released a statement on June 23 suggesting the senators took Walsh's speech out of context and defended the Comptroller.

== Current status ==
On September 8, 2011, a Senate panel approved the nomination of Thomas Curry, then serving as a director of the Federal Deposit Insurance Corp., as Comptroller of the Currency.

The full Senate confirmed Curry on March 29, 2012, and Curry was sworn in on April 9, 2012, ending Walsh's tenure as acting Comptroller.
