= Louis T. McFadden =

American politician

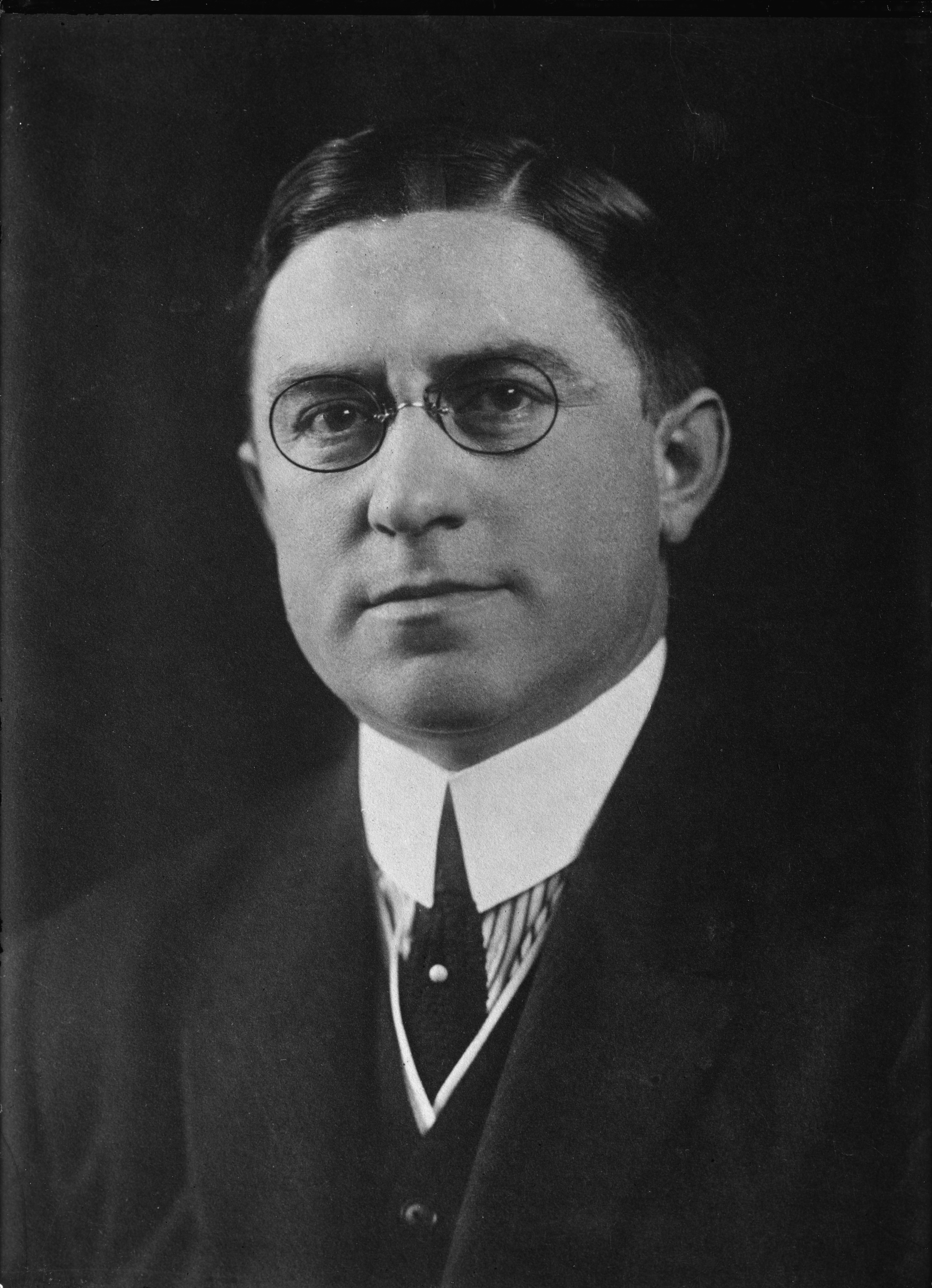
- McFadden c. 1910–25

Chairman of the Committee on Banking and Currency
- In office June 7, 1920 – March 4, 1931
- Preceded by: Edmund Platt
- Succeeded by: Henry B. Steagall

Member of the U.S. House of Representatives from Pennsylvania
- In office March 4, 1915 – January 3, 1935
- Preceded by: William D.B. Ainey
- Succeeded by: Charles E. Dietrich
- Constituency: 14th district (1915–23); 15th district (1923–35)

Personal details
- Born: July 25, 1876 Bradford County, Pennsylvania, U.S.
- Died: October 1, 1936 (aged 60) New York City, New York, U.S.
- Party: Republican

Louis Thomas McFadden (July 25, 1876 – October 1, 1936) was a Republican member of the United States House of Representatives from Pennsylvania, serving from 1915 to 1935. A banker by trade, he was the chief sponsor of the 1927 McFadden Act, which rechartered the Federal Reserve System in perpetuity, liberalized branch banking for national banks and increased competition between member and non-member banks. He is known for his antisemitic conspiracy theories, which eventually saw him lose his seat in the House of Representatives.

== Early life ==
McFadden was born in Granville Center, Granville Township, Bradford County, Pennsylvania. He graduated from Warner's Commercial College (currently known as the Elmira Business Institute) in Elmira, New York. In 1892, he entered the employ of the First National Bank in Canton, Pennsylvania.

In 1899, he was elected cashier; he became its president on January 11, 1916 and served until 1925.

McFadden served as treasurer of the Pennsylvania Bankers' Association in 1906 and 1907, and as president in 1914 and 1915. He was appointed in 1914 by the agricultural societies of the State of Pennsylvania as a trustee of Pennsylvania State College.

== Political career ==
In 1914, McFadden was elected as a Republican Representative to the Sixty-fourth Congress and to the nine succeeding Congresses. He served as Chairman of the United States House Committee on Banking and Currency during the Sixty-sixth through Seventy-first Congresses, or 1920-1931. Though re-elected without opposition in 1932, he lost to the Democratic nominee in 1934. He was an unsuccessful candidate for nomination in 1936.

McFadden's main official legacy was the working on and the passing of the McFadden Act of 1927, limiting nationally-chartered branch banks to the state in which the main branch operates. The Act sought to give national banks competitive equality with state-chartered banks by letting national banks operate branch banks to the extent permitted by state law. The McFadden Act specifically prohibited interstate branching by allowing national banks to branch only within the state in which they were situated. Although the Riegle-Neal Interstate Banking and Branching Efficiency Act of 1994 repealed this provision of the McFadden Act, it specified that state law continues to control intrastate branching, or branching within a state's borders, for both state and national banks.

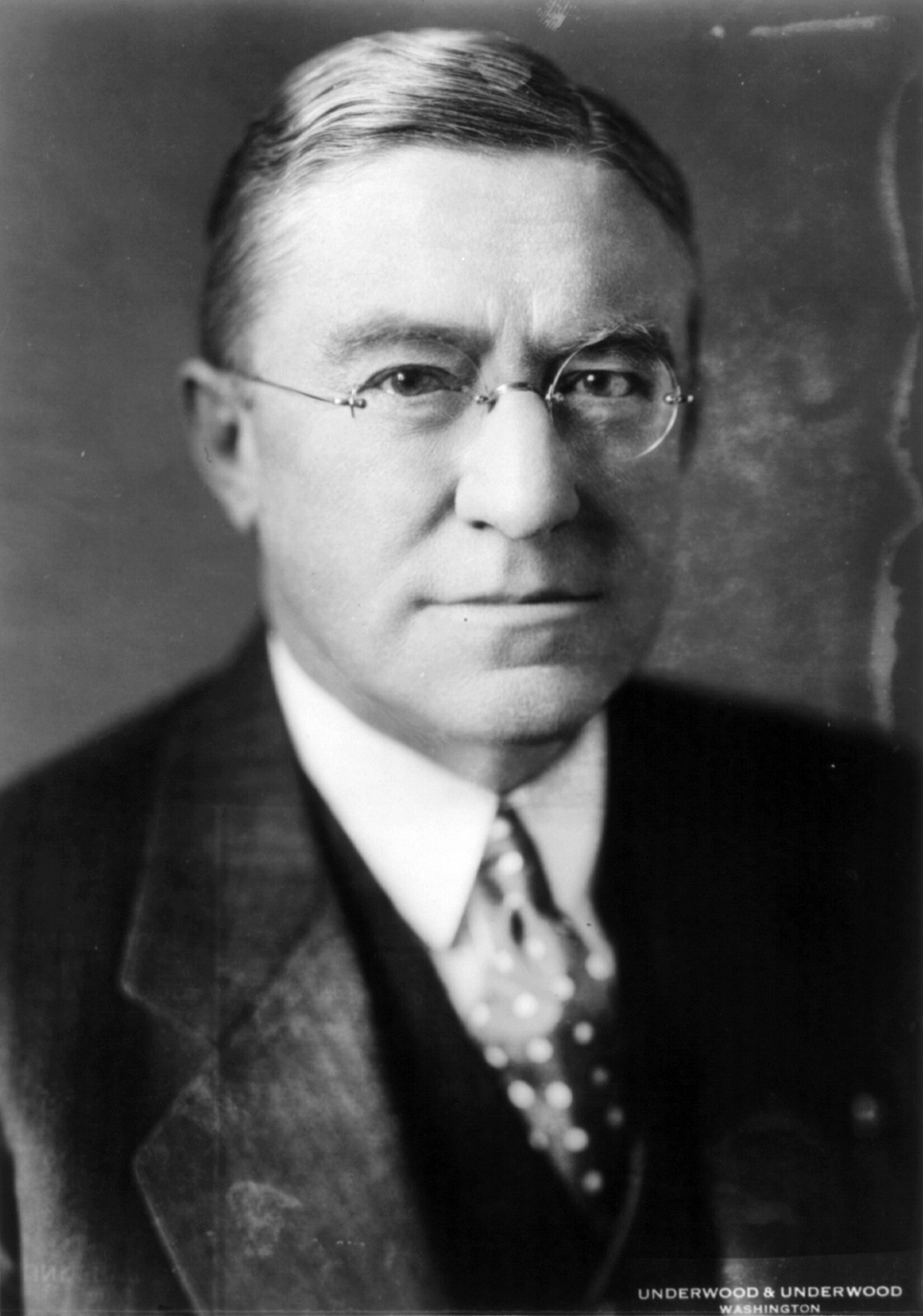
McFadden in 1931

McFadden later became a "vociferous foe of the Federal Reserve", which he claimed was created and operated by Jewish banking interests who conspired to economically control the United States. In a speech in the House of Representatives in December 1931, McFadden accused Paul Warburg, one of the leading forces behind the Federal Reserve Act, of “having engineered the great depression.” On June 10, 1932, McFadden made a 25-minute speech before the House of Representatives, in which he accused the Federal Reserve of deliberately causing the Great Depression.

After the expulsion from Washington, D.C., of the veteran petitioners of the Bonus Army, which he called "the greatest crime in modern history", McFadden moved to impeach President Herbert Hoover in 1932, and he also introduced a resolution bringing conspiracy charges against the Board of Governors of the Federal Reserve. The impeachment resolution was defeated by a vote of 361 to 8; it was seen as a big vote of confidence to President Hoover from the House. According to Time magazine McFadden was "denounced and condemned by all Republicans for his 'contemptible gesture'." The Central Press Association reported that he was "virtually read out of his party ... [had] his committee posts ... taken away from him…was ostracized by Republicans [and] called crazy ...". Sen. David A. Reed (R-PA) said "We intend to act to all practical purposes as though McFadden had died".

In 1933, he introduced House Resolution No. 158, which included articles of impeachment for the Secretary of the Treasury, two assistant Secretaries of the Treasury, the Board of Governors of the Federal Reserve, and the officers and directors of its twelve regional banks.

In 1934, he made several comments from the floor of the House and in newsletters to his constituents wherein he cited the Protocols of the Elders of Zion, claimed the Roosevelt administration was controlled by Jews, and objected to Henry Morgenthau Jr., who was Jewish, becoming Secretary of the Treasury. Drew Pearson claimed in his "Washington Merry-Go-Round" column that, in a publication by the American fascist Silver Shirts, McFadden had been "extensively" quoted "in support of Adolf Hitler". In September the Nazi tabloid Der Stuermer praised McFadden. He was also lauded by the publications of William Dudley Pelley, leader of the Silver Shirts, on several occasions. On election day that year he lost to Charles E. Dietrich by "about 2,000 votes". This was the only election between 1912 and 1950 when the district elected a Democrat.

According to McFadden's Jewish Telegraphic Agency obituary: "In January 1935, he announced his candidacy for president with the backing of an organization called 'the Independent Republican National Christian-Gentile Committee' on a platform to 'keep the Jew out of control of the Republican Party!'" Not garnering much support for his presidential bid, he tried to win back his congressional seat. He lost the nomination by a wide-margin to Col. Albert G. Rutherford who went on to win the general election.

== Death ==
He was in New York City visiting with his wife and son in late September 1936, when he was taken ill at his hotel and died of coronary thrombosis shortly thereafter in the Hospital for Ruptured and Crippled, in Manhattan. He was interred in East Canton Cemetery in Canton Township, Bradford County, Pennsylvania.

== See also ==
- Elizabeth Dilling
- Criticism of the Federal Reserve

U.S. House of Representatives
Preceded by William D. B. Ainey	Member of the U.S. House of Representatives from Pennsylvania's 14th congressional district 1915–1923	Succeeded by William M. Croll
Preceded by Edgar R. Kiess	Member of the U.S. House of Representatives from Pennsylvania's 15th congressional district 1923–1935	Succeeded by Charles E. Dietrich
