= Charles Dietrich =

Charles Dietrich is the name of:

- Charles E. Dietrich (1889–1942), American politician from Pennsylvania
- Charles H. Dietrich (1853–1924), American politician from Nebraska
