= Joseph McIntosh =

Joseph McIntosh or Joe McIntosh may refer to:

- Joseph W. McIntosh (1873–1952), United States Comptroller of the Currency, 1924–28
- Joe McIntosh (Joseph Anthony McIntosh, born 1951), former Major League Baseball pitcher
- Joseph McIntosh (Canadian politician), for Klondike (electoral district), Yukon
- Joe McIntosh (American football) (born 1962), American football running back
