= Noreika =

- Lithuanian surname
- m.: Noreika
- f.: (unmarried): Noreikaitė, Noreikytė
- f.: (married): Noreikienė
- f.: (short): Noreikė

Noreika is a Lithuanian language family name. It was derived from the Lithuanian words norėti, 'to desire' or norus, 'greedy'.

The surname may refer to:

- Jonas Noreika (1910–1947), Lithuanian army officer, anti-Soviet rebel
- Keith Noreika, American lawyer
- Liudas Noreika (1884–1928), Lithuanian attorney, activist, and politician
- Maryellen Noreika (born 1966), American jurist
- Pranas Noreika (1927–2021), Lithuanian engineer, statesman, industrial manager
- Rūta Oginskaitė-Noreikaitė (born 1954). Lithuanian journalist and film critic
- Virgilijus Noreika (1935–2018), Lithuanian tenor
