= Keith Noreika =

American lawyer

Keith A. Noreika

United States Ambassador to Lithuania
- Nominee
- Assuming office TBD
- President: Donald Trump
- Succeeding: Kara McDonald

Acting Comptroller of the Currency
- In office May 5, 2017 – November 27, 2017
- Preceded by: Thomas J. Curry
- Succeeded by: Joseph Otting

Personal details
- Born: Pennsylvania, United States
- Party: Republican
- Education: University of Pennsylvania (BS); Harvard University (JD)

Keith A. Noreika is an American lawyer who specializes in the regulation of financial institutions. He served as Acting Comptroller of the Currency from May 5, 2017, to November 27, 2017, following the 30th Comptroller of the Currency, Thomas J. Curry, and preceding the 31st Comptroller of the Currency, Joseph Otting. Noreika rejoined the law firm of Simpson Thacher on January 8, 2018. He joined Patomak Global Partners as Executive Vice President and Chairman of its Banking Supervision and Regulation Group on July 5, 2022. In 2026, Noreika was nominated to be U.S. Ambassador to Lithuania.

== Career at the OCC ==
As Acting Comptroller of the Currency, Noreika headed a 4,000-person agency responsible for chartering, regulating, and supervising all national banks and federal savings associations as well as federal branches and agencies of foreign banks in the United States. The Office of the Comptroller of the Currency supervises approximately 1,400 national banks and federal savings associations and about 50 federal branches and agencies of foreign banks in the United States. These institutions comprise nearly two-thirds of the assets of the commercial banking system. The Comptroller also is a director of the Federal Deposit Insurance Corporation (FDIC) and member of the Financial Stability Oversight Council.

== Major Issues as Acting Comptroller of the Currency ==
Noreika's focused on reducing regulations, promoting economic growth and opportunity, and enhancing the value of the federal charter for national banks, federal savings associations, and federal branches of foreign banks operating the United States.

=== Arbitration ===
Noreika played a role in the opposition of a rule made by the Consumer Financial Protection Bureau (CFPB) regarding arbitration agreements in the contracts of certain financial products. He first raised concerns with the proposed rule in June 2017 questioning whether the rule would adversely affect the safety and soundness of community banks and savings associations. Following the issuance of the final rule, the OCC conducted a review of the data and analysis used by the CFPB to develop and support the rule. The OCC found that the rule would likely increase the cost of credit by a significant amount. Noreika summarized his concerns with the rule in an op-ed in The Hill on October 13, 2017. The U.S. Treasury followed with a separate analysis criticizing the rule. On October 24, 2017, the U.S. Senate voted to overturn the CFPB using the Congressional Review Act, and on November 1, 2017, President Trump signed the resolution repealing the rule.

=== De Novo Banks ===
On October 27, 2017, Noreika signed and presented the first full-service national bank charter since the financial crisis to Winter Park National Bank of Florida. As Acting Comptroller of the Currency, Noreika advocated to make the process for chartering new banks and obtaining federal deposit insurance more efficient. Those views were summarized in an op-ed in the American Banker on October 30, 2017. In the article, Noreika repeated calls made during June 2017 testimony before the U.S. Senate to change the process to rely on the due diligence, examination and judgment of the prudential regulator during its decision-making process both to grant a bank charter and grant deposit insurance, unless the FDIC objects, with reason, within a given period. This approach would reduce the paperwork burden for applicants and create a clearer timeline for a final decision. Eliminating ambiguity would help de novo banks project startup costs and timing, which is critical for companies raising capital and kicking off a new business. At the same time, the suggestion preserves the FDIC's veto power if it has reason to differ substantively with the judgment of the primary regulator.

=== Short-Term, Small-Dollar Lending ===
Following the CFPB's issuance of its final rule on payday lending, the OCC rescinded its guidance related to Deposit Advance Products, a kind of short-term loan repaid from customers' direct deposits to their accounts. Noreika stated that it has become difficult for banks to serve consumers' need for short-term, small-dollar credit in part because of the guidance. As a result, consumers who would rely on highly regulated banks and thrifts for these legitimate and well-regulated products to meet their financial needs turn to other, lesser regulated entities, which may result in consumer harm and expense, hurting the very consumers it was intended to help—the most marginalized, unbanked and underbanked portions of society. Noreika repeated calls made by prior Comptrollers encouraging banks and savings associations to meet the short-term, small-dollar credit needs of consumers. He summarized these views in an op-ed in The Hill on November 17, 2017.

=== Community Reinvestment Act ===
Noreika approved several changes related to the Community Reinvestment Act. The changes provide greater transparency regarding the OCC's framework for evaluating certain types of licensing applications and incentive for covered institutions to support the goals of the Community Reinvestment Act. The changes also require evaluation of banks' performance under the Community Reinvestment Act to consider activities directly related to community reinvestments and states that it is OCC policy not to lower a bank's Community Reinvestment Act composite or component rating by more than one rating level.

=== Reducing Regulatory Burden and Promoting Economic Opportunity ===
Noreika advocated for changes to regulations that reduced unnecessary burden on banks and promoted economic opportunity, while ensuring financial institutions continued to operate in a safe and sound manner, provide fair access to financial services, and treat customers fairly. Noreika proposed a number of changes to the Volcker Rule (§ 619 of 12 U.S.C. § 1851, the Dodd–Frank Wall Street Reform and Consumer Protection Act). On August 2, 2017, the OCC solicited public input on whether certain aspects of the implementing regulation should be revised to better accomplish the purposes of section 619 while decreasing the compliance burden on banking entities and fostering economic growth. Noreika also called for policy makers to rethink their use of arbitrary thresholds, specifically the $50 billion asset threshold for determining systemically important financial institutions (SIFI). Thresholds such as these become barriers to competition and can serve to protect the largest institutions, according to Noreika. On November 13, 2017, Senator Mike Crapo announced a bipartisan proposal to exempt small banks from the Volcker Rule and revise the threshold for SIFIs.

Noreika also pushed to rationalize and simplify capital requirements for banks and savings associations to ensure banks continued to operate in a safe and sound manner and remain capable of serving as powerful engines for the U.S. economy and meeting the needs of consumers, businesses, and communities across the United States. Federal banking agencies took initial steps to simplify regulatory capital in August 2017 and September 2017.

=== Innovation and Financial Technology ===
Noreika continued to encourage responsible innovation in the federal banking system and to support federal charters for financial technology companies engaged in the business of banking, as had his predecessor.

The Conference of State Bank Supervisors and the New York Department of Financial Services (NYDFS) sued the OCC, challenging its authority to grant special purpose national bank charters to nondepository financial technology companies engaged in the business of banking. Companies engaged in the business of banking can seek a national bank charter under the agency's existing authority to charter full-service national banks and federal saving associations, as well as other long-established special purpose national banks, such as trust banks, bankers' banks, and other so-called CEBA banks. According to Noreika, chartering innovative de novo institutions through these existing authorities enhances the federal banking system, increases choice, promotes economic opportunity, and can improve services to consumers, businesses, and communities. On December 12, 2017, a federal judge in Manhattan dismissed the NYDFS' lawsuit challenging the OCC's fintech-charter effort, finding that legal challenges to the initiative were premature.

=== Separation of Banking and Commerce ===
Noreika questioned the presumptive separation of banking and commerce in the United States. He suggested policy makers should reexamine the reasons for maintaining the separation of banking and commerce to determine whether it still makes sense for banks, businesses, and the economy today. In a speech before The Clearing House on November 8, 2017, he pointed out that the United States is unusual in maintaining a separation between banking and commerce. He suggested that by allowing banking and commerce to mix, small banks could access more diverse sources of capital and consumers could benefit from increased choice and greater competition among financial service providers.

=== Bank Holding Companies and the Bank Holding Company Act ===
While at the OCC, Noreika raised questions regarding the continued usefulness of the Bank Holding Company Act and whether bank holding companies had become obsolete. He explored how bank holding companies have evolved in the United States and their advantages and disadvantages for banking companies during a speech at the American Enterprise Institute on November 28, 2017.

=== Special Government Employee ===
While Acting Comptroller of the Currency, Noreika was a Special Government Employee (SGE). As a special government employee serving on a short-term basis (expected to serve fewer than 130 days in a 365-day period), he was not required to sign the Executive Branch ethics pledge, consistent with guidance from the Office of Government Ethics under Presidents Obama and Trump. The 130 days is an expectation and does not bar SGE from serving more than that number of days. Following his service, Noreika will be permanently barred from communicating with or appearing before any executive or judicial branch employee on behalf of any person concerning any particular matter involving specific parties in which he participated personally and substantially at any time as a federal employee. And, for two years after leaving government he will be barred from communicating with or appearing before any executive or judicial branch employee on behalf of any person concerning any particular matter involving specific parties which he knows or reasonably should know was pending under his official responsibility during the last year of his federal service. These restrictions are described at 18 USC 207 (a) and (b).

== Prior to serving as Acting Comptroller of the Currency ==
Prior to becoming Acting Comptroller of the Currency, Noreika served on President Donald J. Trump's transition team within the U.S. Department of the Treasury.

Noreika served as a partner in Simpson Thacher & Bartlett LLP and a member of the firm's Financial Institutions Practice, where he focused on banking regulation and related litigation. He advised a range of domestic and international financial institutions on regulatory issues relating to mergers and acquisitions, minority investments, capital issuances, structuring and compliance activities, and litigation matters, particularly in the area of federal preemption. Noreika's experience includes advising regional, multinational, and other banks on the structuring of their operations, including complying with the Volcker Rule and Consumer Financial Protection Bureau regulations, and Bank Secrecy Act and anti-money laundering rules. He has represented national banks before the U.S. Supreme Court, the U.S. Courts of Appeals, and the U.S. District Courts. He previously served as partner at Covington & Burling LLP.

== At Patomak Global Partners ==
Noreika joined Patomak Global Partners in July 2022 and serves as the firm's Executive Vice President and Banking Supervision and Regulation Group Chairman. He reports directly to Paul S. Atkins and functions as his primary deputy. In this role, Noreika leads Patomak's projects related to the U.S. banking industry, including financial technology and cryptocurrency companies.

== Academic career ==
Noreika has been an adjunct faculty member at the University of Pennsylvania Law School and the University of Virginia School of Law. He received his juris doctor in 1997 from Harvard Law School, where he was editor of the Harvard Law Review. He earned his Bachelor of Science from The Wharton School of the University of Pennsylvania in 1994.
