= Brian P. Brooks =

American government official (born 1969)

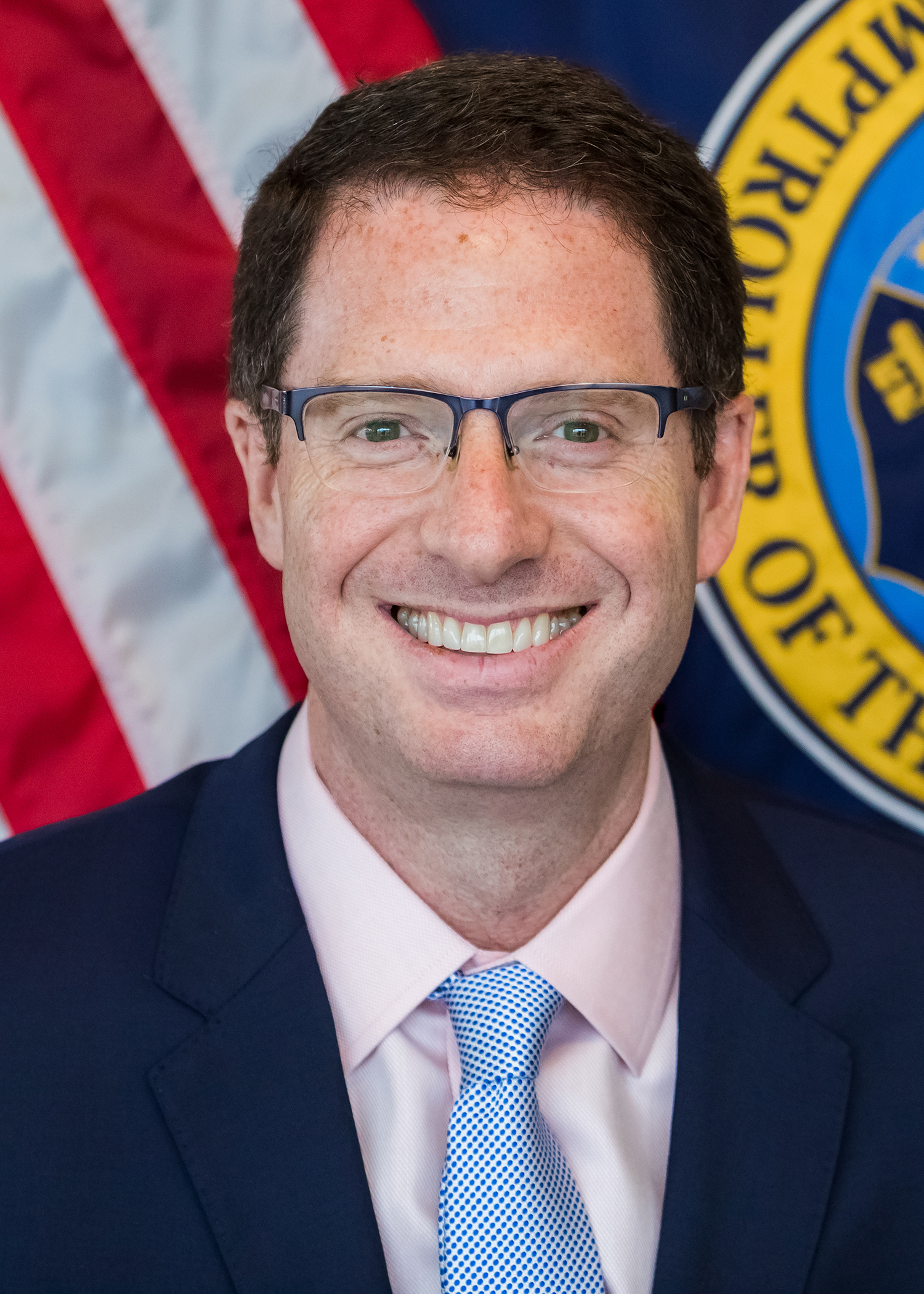
- Official portrait, 2020

Acting Comptroller of the Currency
- In office May 29, 2020 – January 14, 2021
- President: Donald Trump
- Preceded by: Joseph Otting
- Succeeded by: Blake Paulson

Personal details
- Born: 1969 (age 56–57) Pueblo, Colorado, U.S.
- Education: Harvard University (AB); University of Chicago (JD)

Brian Paul Brooks (born 1969) is an American lawyer, banker, entrepreneur, technologist, and former government official. He served as Acting Comptroller of the Currency from May 29, 2020, succeeding the 31st Comptroller of the Currency Joseph Otting, until January 14, 2021. Brooks was nominated twice by President Donald Trump for a five-year term as Comptroller of the Currency, once during the 116th Congress, and once in the 117th Congress.

== Early life and education ==
Brooks grew up in Pueblo, Colorado. He holds a bachelor's degree from Harvard University in government and a J.D. degree from the University of Chicago Law School.

== Career ==
=== O’Melveny & Myers ===
Brooks's career includes working as Managing Partner of the Washington, D.C. office of the global law firm O’Melveny & Myers, where he led an office of more than 150 attorneys, represented major financial services companies in a variety of litigation and enforcement matters, and played a lead role in crafting the banking industry's response to the 2010–2011 foreclosure crisis. Brooks also chaired the firm's Financial Services Practice Group and was an elected member of the firm's 12-partner board of directors known as the Policy Committee.

=== OneWest Bank ===
Following his work at O’Melveny & Myers, Brooks served as Vice Chairman of OneWest Bank from 2011 to 2014, where he served as chief legal officer and oversaw the bank's legal department along with its fair lending, corporate customer experience, and mortgage marketing and communications groups. In that position, he advised executive management and the board of directors on legal, risk, and strategic issues; developed and implemented strategies to manage litigation and government inquiries; led deal teams for strategic transactions; and led the bank's compliance with regulatory orders on mortgage servicing and foreclosures.

=== Fannie Mae ===
From 2014 to 2018, Brooks served as Executive Vice President, General Counsel, and Corporate Secretary of the $3.2 trillion Fannie Mae. In this role, he oversaw the Legal Department and Government and Industry Relations and served as a senior advisor to the Chief Executive Officer and the Board of Directors.

=== Coinbase ===
After working at Fannie Mae, Brooks was Chief Legal Officer of Coinbase from 2018 to 2020. Coinbase is an $8 billion Silicon Valley startup that is one of the largest digital currency platforms in the world. At Coinbase, he was responsible for the company's legal, compliance, internal audit, government relations, and global intelligence groups.

=== BitFury Group ===
From October 2021 to 2022, Brooks served as ex-CEO of Bitfury Group, a blockchain technology company and one of the largest private infrastructure providers in the blockchain ecosystem. Bitfury Group was founded in 2011, and offers technology services such as artificial intelligence, blockchain, bitcoin mining services, high-performance computing, and a digital cryptocurrencies payments platform for enterprises called Peach. Currently, he serves as a member on the Board of Directors for the company.

=== Boards and advisory roles ===
Brooks serves on the board of The HBAR Foundation, which is a foundation that supports the growth and development of the open source, public distributed ledger network called Hedera. Brooks serves on the boards of two special purpose acquisition companies: Valor Latitude Acquisition Corp. and EJF Acquisition Corp. He is also a board member of Spring Labs.

Brooks served from March 2019 through March 2020 as a member of the Board of Directors of Fannie Mae, where he sat on the company's Risk Policy and Capital Committee and its Strategic Initiatives and Technology Committee.

In addition, Brooks has been deeply involved in the financial technology sector. From November 2017 through March 2020 he served with former FDIC Chair Sheila Bair, former American Express CEO Jim Robinson, and others on the board of directors of Avant, Inc., a marketplace lending and technology platform company. He was also an advisor to financial technology companies Spring Labs, a blockchain-enabled digital credit bureau, and EarnUp, a consumer loan payment platform.

He has been in news for as a potential candidate for SEC chairperson under Donald Trump's presidency in 2025.

== Comptroller of the Currency ==
Flag of the United States Comptroller of the Currency

Brooks joined the Comptroller of the Currency (OCC) in April 2020 as Senior Deputy Comptroller and Chief Operating Officer. In this role, Brooks oversaw the agency's bank supervision, bank supervision policy, economics, supervisory system and analytical support, systemic risk identification support and specialty supervision, and innovation functions. He served as a member of the OCC's Executive Committee and was the Chair of the Technology and Systems Subcommittee.

Secretary of the Treasury Steven T. Mnuchin designated Brooks the OCC's First Deputy Comptroller, under his authority set forth in 12 USC § 4. Pursuant to 12 USC § 4, Brooks became Acting Comptroller upon Comptroller Otting's resignation on May 29, 2020.

On May 29, 2020, Brooks signed a final rule to clarify the long-standing "valid when made" doctrine to clarify that when a national bank or savings association sells, assigns, or otherwise transfers a loan, interest permissible before the transfer continues to be permissible after the transfer.

On October 27, 2020, Brooks signed an OCC rule to clarify when a national bank or federal savings association (bank) makes a loan and is the “true lender,” including in the context of a partnership between a bank and a third party.

On November 20, 2020, the OCC, under Brooks, proposed a rule that it argued would ensure “fair access” to banking services provided by national banks, federal savings associations, and federal branches and agencies of foreign bank organizations. The rule, which was proposed after President Trump had already lost the election and which the head of the Bank Policy Institute called “poorly constructed,” will force banks to lend to payday lenders, gun companies and others even if they do not support the activities such companies engage in. It was finalized on January 14, 2021.

=== Community Reinvestment Act ===
On May 20, 2020, the OCC, under Joseph Otting finalized a rule to strengthen and modernize regulations implementing the Community Reinvestment Act for national banks and savings associations. According to the OCC, the final rule will increase bank CRA-related lending, investment, and services in low- and moderate-income communities where there is significant need for credit, more responsible lending, and greater access to banking services by:

- Clarifying what qualifies for CRA consideration.
- Updating how banks define assessment areas by retaining immediate geographies around branches and establishing additional assessment areas for banks that do not rely on branch networks to serve their customers.
- Evaluating bank CRA performance more objectively through quantitative measures that assess the volume and value of activity.
- Making reporting more transparent and timelier.
- Providing greater support for small businesses, small and family-owned farms, and Indian Country.
- Thoroughly evaluating banks’ CRA performance in all their assessment areas, not just a limited evaluation in some of them.

The U.S. Senate upheld the rule on October 19, 2020, when it rejected a resolution under the Congressional Review act to overturn the rule.

=== Responsible Innovation ===
On July 10, 2020, Brooks announced the launch of Project REACh. REACh stands for Roundtable for Economic Access and Change, and the project brings together leaders from the banking industry, national civil rights organizations, business, and technology to reduce specific barriers that prevent full, equal, and fair participation in the nation's economy.

On July 22, 2020, the OCC, under Brooks' direction, published a letter clarifying national banks' and federal savings associations' authority to provide cryptocurrency custody services for customers. The letter concludes that providing cryptocurrency custody services, including holding unique cryptographic keys associated with cryptocurrency, is a modern form of traditional bank activities related to custody services. Crypto custody services may extend beyond passively holding "keys." On September 21, 2020, the OCC, under Brooks, issued a second letter regarding cryptocurrencies, which clarified national bank and savings association authority to hold deposits reserves backing stablecoins.

=== Charters and Licensing ===
On July 31, 2020, Brooks signed the first full-service national bank charter for a consumer-focused financial technology company engaged in the business of banking—Varo Bank N.A. In making the announcement, Brooks said the bank's opening "represents the evolution of banking and a new generation of banks that are born from innovation and built on technology intended to empower consumers and businesses." Under Brooks's leadership, the OCC also approved the merger of fintech payments startup Jiko and Mid-Central Federal Savings Bank, marking the first time a fintech was approved to acquire an existing insured depository institution. Fintech startup SoFi also received conditional approval from the OCC for a de novo national bank charter during Brooks's tenure.

On January 13, 2021, the OCC under Brooks conditionally approved of "the conversion of Anchorage Trust Company, a South Dakota chartered trust company, to become Anchorage Digital Bank, National Association."

=== Significant Enforcement Actions ===
On August 6, 2020, a Brooks-led OCC assessed an $80 million civil money penalty against Capital One, N.A., and Capital One Bank (USA), N.A., related to the bank's 2019 cyber breach, which affected millions of customers.

On September 21, 2020, the OCC took enforcement against three former senior executives of Wells Fargo Bank, N.A., Sioux Falls, South Dakota, for their roles in the bank's systemic sales practices misconduct. The settlements included: (1) a prohibition order and $925,000 civil money penalty (CMP) to former Community Bank Group Finance Officer Matthew Raphaelson; (2) a personal cease and desist order (PC&D) and $400,000 CMP to the former Head of Community Bank Deposit Products Group Kenneth Zimmerman; and (3) a PC&D and $350,000 CMP to the former Head of Community Bank Human Resources Tracy Kidd.

On October 7, 2020, under Brooks, the OCC issued a $400 million civil money penalty against Citibank related to deficiencies in enterprise-wide risk management, compliance risk management, data governance, and internal controls.

On October 8, 2020, the OCC fined Morgan Stanley Bank NA and Morgan Stanley Private Bank NA $60 million for risk management problems tied to a 2016 data breach.

On October 14, 2020, the OCC fined USAA Federal Savings Bank $85 million "for shortcomings in its risk management and compliance with laws protecting service members."

On November 24, 2020, the OCC under Brooks fined JPMorgan Chase Bank, N.A., $250 million for "failure to maintain adequate internal controls and internal audit over its fiduciary business."

=== Nomination and End of Term ===
On November 17, 2020, President Donald Trump announced his intention to nominate Brooks to a five-year term, and his nomination was submitted to the Senate on November 27, 2020. On January 3, 2021, his nomination was returned to the President under Rule XXXI, Paragraph 6 of the United States Senate. On January 14, 2021, Brooks stepped down and Blake Paulson became Acting Comptroller of the Currency.

== Binance.US ==
On April 20, 2021, the Wall Street Journal report that Brooks would become CEO of Binance.US, a cryptocurrency exchange, on May 1, 2021.

After just 3 months, he quit the job on August 6, 2021.

== Personal life ==
Brooks has played significant roles in professional, charitable and community development organizations. He has served as a board member of the California Bankers Association (vice chairman at large), the Housing Policy Council (executive council), the Appleseed Foundation (chairman), the National Symphony Orchestra (treasurer), the Los Angeles Master Chorale (treasurer), the Blockchain Association, and the Pasadena Conservatory of Music. He is also an elected member of the American Law Institute. An accomplished musician, Brooks is a classical pianist and also plays keyboards in DC-area classic rock cover band The Johnny Esquire Band. He lives with his wife Janet in Pasadena, California.

Government offices
| Preceded by Joseph Otting | Acting Comptroller of the Currency; 2020–2021 | Succeeded by Blake Paulson |
