= Michael J. Hsu =

Acting Comptroller of the Currency

Michael Hsu
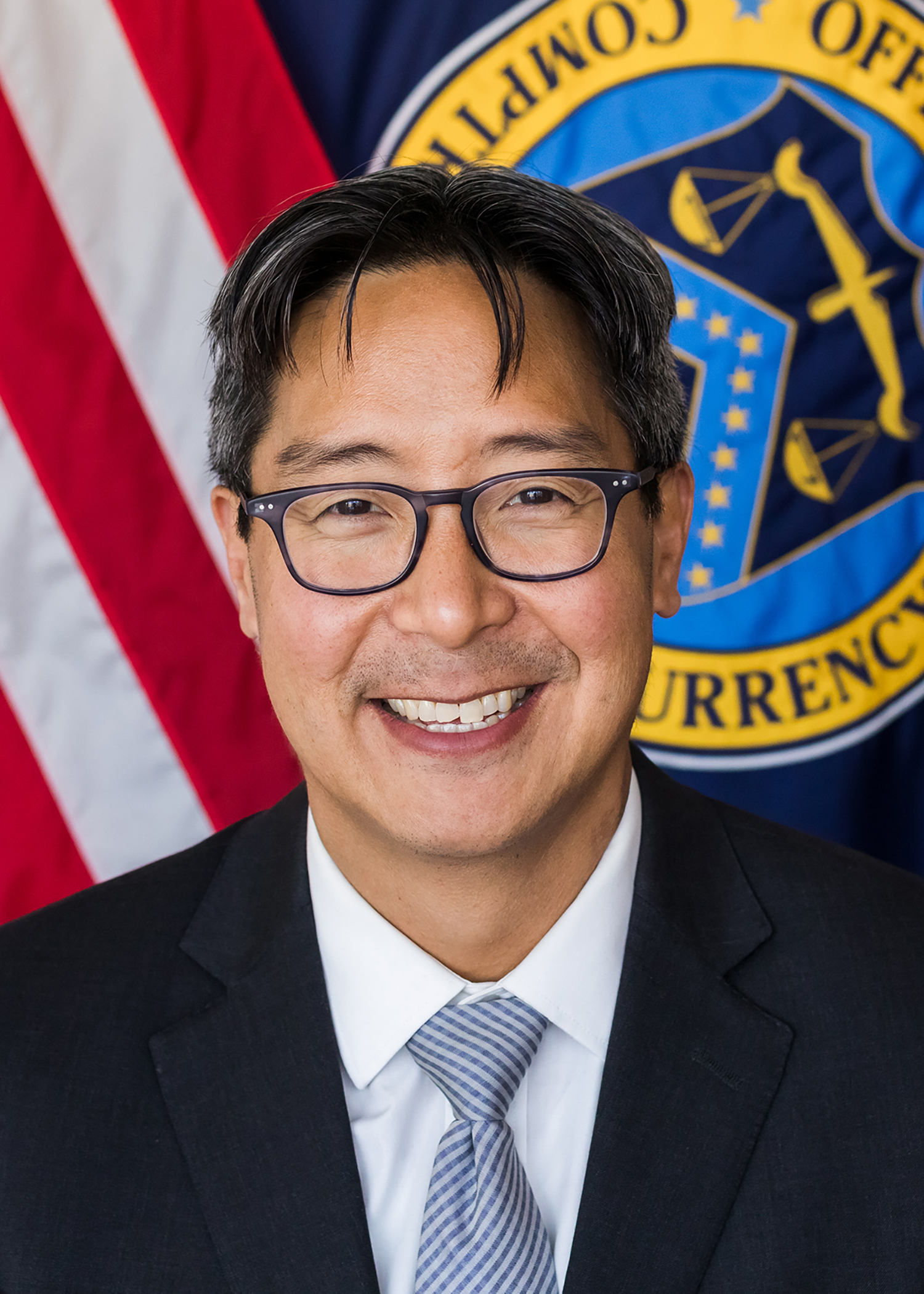

Acting Comptroller of the Currency
- In office May 10, 2021 – February 10, 2025
- President: Joe Biden; Donald Trump
- Preceded by: Blake Paulson (acting)
- Succeeded by: Rodney E. Hood (acting)

Personal details
- Education: Brown University (BA); George Washington University (MS); New York University (JD)

Michael J. Hsu is an American civil servant who served as the Acting Comptroller of the Currency. Prior to this role, Hsu served as an associate director in the Division of Supervision and Regulation at the Federal Reserve Board of Governors.

Secretary of the Treasury Janet Yellen designated Hsu as First Deputy Comptroller on May 10, 2021, making him the Acting Comptroller of the Currency.

As the Acting Comptroller of the Currency, Hsu held an ex officio seat on the board of directors of the Federal Deposit Insurance Corporation.

== Career ==
He started his career in 2002 as a staff attorney in the Federal Reserve Board's Legal Division. At the Federal Reserve, he led the Large Institution Supervision Coordinating Committee (LISCC) Program.

Secretary of the Treasury Janet Yellen designated Hsu as First Deputy Comptroller on May 10, 2021, making him the Acting Comptroller of the Currency. On November 23, 2021, he announced that banks would not be allowed to provide certain cryptocurrency services unless they met several regulations.

In July 2024, he defended federal preemption of banking regulation over state regulations, which was praised by the American Bankers Association.

Citing the collapse of Synapse, in October 2024, he endorsed federal oversight of digital payments, saying there was a regulatory gap.

In November 2024, as Acting Comptroller of the Currency, Hsu warned against regulators allowing "too much leeway" in AI applications for financial firms and banks, saying that regulators and firms should "co-learn" the technology.

Government offices
Preceded by Blake Paulson	Acting Comptroller of the Currency; 2021–	Succeeded by Incumbent
