= John W. Pole =

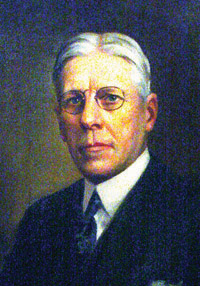

17th Comptroller of the Currency
- In office November 21, 1928 - September 20, 1932
- President: Calvin Coolidge; Herbert Hoover
- Preceded by: Joseph W. McIntosh
- Succeeded by: J. F. T. O'Connor

Personal details
- Born: December 9, 1870 Kings Lynn, England
- Died: May 1, 1958 (aged 87) Fairfield, Illinois, United States
- Education: Institution of Civil Engineers
- Occupation: bank examiner

John William Pole (December 9, 1870 – May 1, 1958) was a United States Comptroller of the Currency from November 21, 1928, to September 20, 1932.

Pole was a native of England. He was appointed a national bank examiner in 1915 and subsequently chief examiner for the Sixth Federal Reserve District.

Pole was serving as chief national bank examiner of the United States when President Calvin Coolidge appointed him Comptroller. His administration witnessed the financial boom that led up to 1929 and the crash that followed. Pole advocated allowing more liberal branch banking to reduce the number of small, weak banks and as an alternative to the formulation of holding companies that were being organized on a large scale. Pole later resigned to enter private business.
