= Blake Paulson =

Career US national bank examiner and acting Comptroller of the Currency

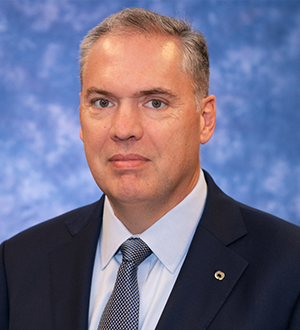

Acting Comptroller of the Currency
- In office January 14, 2021 – May 10, 2021
- President: Donald Trump; Joe Biden
- Preceded by: Brian P. Brooks
- Succeeded by: Michael J. Hsu

Personal details
- Education: University of South Dakota (BS)

Blake Paulson, is an American career national bank examiner, who was the Acting Comptroller of the Currency in 2021.

Paulson became Acting Comptroller of the Currency on January 14, 2021, upon the resignation of Acting Comptroller of the Currency Brian P. Brooks. As Acting Comptroller of the Currency, Mr. Paulson was the administrator of the federal banking system and chief officer of the Comptroller of the Currency (OCC). He held the position until May 10, 2021.

== Early life and education ==
He has a Bachelor of Science in business administration from the University of South Dakota.

== Career ==
Paulson joined the Office of the Comptroller of the Currency in 1986 in Sioux Falls, South Dakota.

In the 1990s, Paulson was the assistant deputy comptroller for midsize bank supervision where he was responsible for a portfolio of national banks with total assets between $10 billion and $30 billion.

In April 2020, Paulson served concurrently as the chief operating officer (COO) of the OCC and senior deputy comptroller for midsize and community bank supervision. As COO, he was responsible for OCC management operations, oversight of staff responsible for systemic risk identification and analytical support, and the Specialty Supervision System. He was designated the chief national bank examiner.

In his role as senior deputy comptroller for midsize and community banks, Paulson was responsible for supervising 1,100 national banks and federal savings associations, and 1,600 OCC employees. Prior to that, he served as associate deputy comptroller and later, as deputy comptroller for the agency's Central District where he was responsible for the oversight of community banks and federal savings associations, independent data service providers, and trust companies across the upper Midwest.

On May 10, 2021, Paulson was succeeded in his role as Acting Comptroller of the Currency by Michael J. Hsu.

== Attribution ==
Government offices
Preceded by Brian P. Brooks	Acting Comptroller of the Currency; 2021	Succeeded by Michael J. Hsu
