= Joseph W. McIntosh =

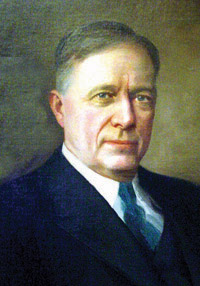

16th Comptroller of the Currency
- In office December 20, 1924 - November 20, 1928
- President: Calvin Coolidge
- Preceded by: Henry M. Dawes
- Succeeded by: John W. Pole

Personal details
- Born: December 23, 1873 Macomb, Illinois
- Died: August 27, 1952 (aged 78) Warrenton, Virginia
- Occupation: banker

Joseph Wallace McIntosh (December 23, 1873 – August 27, 1952) was a United States Comptroller of the Currency from December 20, 1924, to November 20, 1928.

Joseph W. McIntosh, appointed Comptroller by President Calvin Coolidge, was a banker who had served with distinction in World War I.

The passage of the McFadden Act in 1927 brought major changes to the national banking system. National banks could consolidate with state banks under certain conditions. They could establish branches under specified limitations, but only within the limits of the city or town of the parent bank. National bank charters became perpetual unless terminated by voluntary liquidation or receivership. McIntosh became a banker and businessman after his term as Comptroller.
