= Wilson D. Gillette =

American politician (1880–1951)

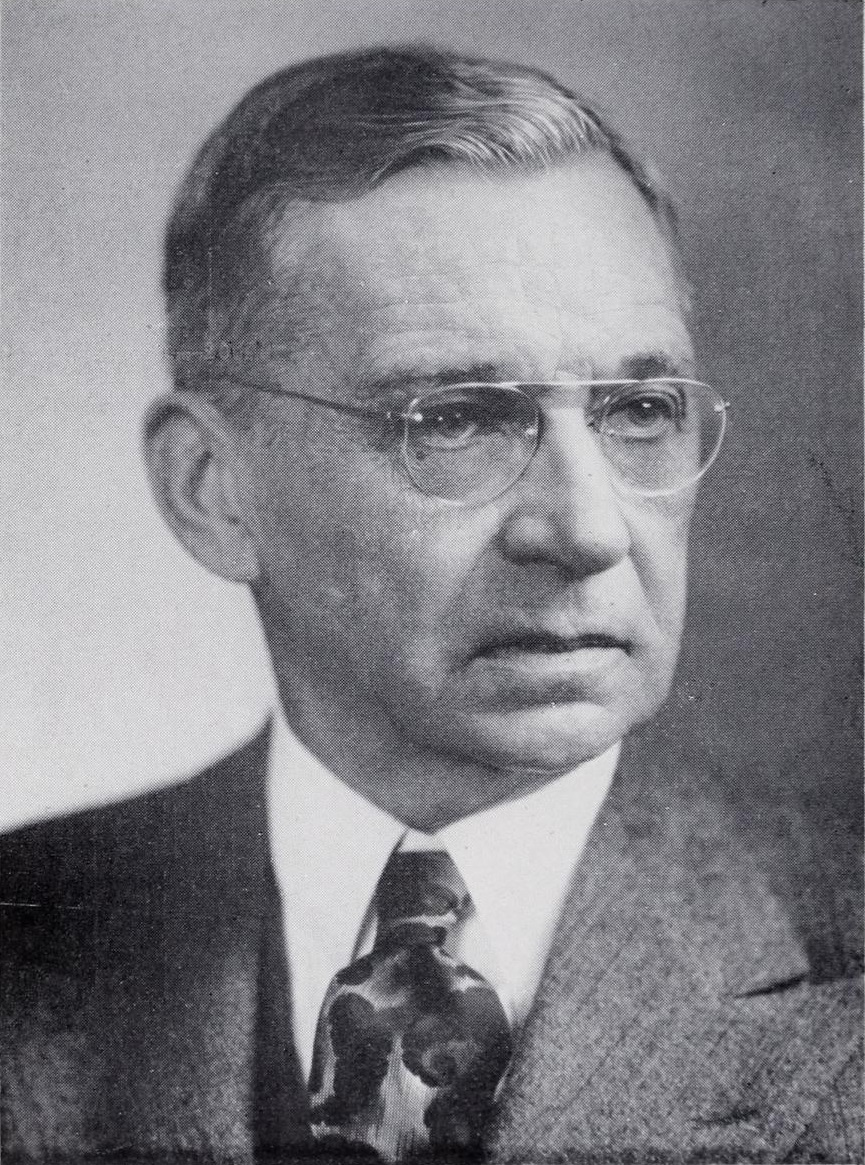
- Frontispiece of 1952's Wilson Darwin Gillette, Late a Representative from Pennsylvania.

Member of the U.S. House of Representatives from Pennsylvania
- In office November 4, 1941 – August 7, 1951
- Preceded by: Albert G. Rutherford
- Succeeded by: Joseph L. Carrigg
- Constituency: 15th district (1941–1945); 14th district (1945–1951)

Member of the Pennsylvania House of Representatives
- In office 1930–1941

Personal details
- Born: July 1, 1880 Sheshequin Township, Pennsylvania, U.S.
- Died: August 7, 1951 (aged 71) Towanda, Pennsylvania, U.S.
- Party: Republican
- Education: Susquehanna Collegiate Institute

Wilson Darwin Gillette (July 1, 1880 – August 7, 1951) was a Republican member of the U.S. House of Representatives from Pennsylvania serving in the United States House of Representatives from 1941 until his death in Towanda, Pennsylvania in 1951.

== Biography ==
He was born on a farm near Sheshequin, Pennsylvania. He attended Susquehanna Collegiate Institute in Towanda, Pennsylvania. He was engaged in agricultural pursuits, clerked in a general store and became a dealer of automobiles in 1913. He was a member of the Pennsylvania State House of Representatives from 1930 to 1941.

Gillette was elected as a Republican to the 77th Congress to fill the vacancy caused by the death of Albert G. Rutherford, and was reelected to the Seventy-eighth and to the four succeeding Congresses and served from November 4, 1941, until his death from bronchial pneumonia in Towanda, Pennsylvania.

== See also ==
- List of members of the United States Congress who died in office (1950–1999)

== Sources ==
- United States Congress. "Wilson D. Gillette (id: G000206)". Biographical Directory of the United States Congress.
- Eilson D. Gillette at The Political Graveyard
- Wilson Darwin Gillette, Late a Representative from Pennsylvania. Washington, DC: U.S. Government Printing Office. 1952.

U.S. House of Representatives
Preceded by Albert G. Rutherford	Member of the U.S. House of Representatives from Pennsylvania's 15th congressional district 1941–1945	Succeeded by Robert F. Rich
Preceded by Daniel K. Hoch	Member of the U.S. House of Representatives from Pennsylvania's 14th congressional district 1945–1951	Succeeded by Joseph L. Carrigg
