= McFadden Act =

United States federal banking legislation

- Other short titles: McFadden Act of 1927
- Long title: An Act To amend section 5139 and section 5146 of the Revised Statutes of the United States, in reference to par value of shares of stock of national banks, and section 5196 of the Revised Statutes of the United States, in reference to reserves of national banks, and for other purposes
- Enacted by: the 69th United States Congress

Citations
- Public law: Pub. L. 69–639
- Statutes at Large: 44 Stat. 1224

Codification
- Acts amended: Federal Reserve Act
- Titles amended: 12

Legislative history
- Introduced in the House as H.R. 2 by Louis T. McFadden; Committee consideration by House Banking and Currency; Passed the House on; Passed the Senate on; Signed into law by President Calvin Coolidge on February 25, 1927

Major amendments
- Banking Act of 1933

The McFadden Act is a United States federal law that reformed the U.S. banking system. The Act liberalized branch banking rules, forcing states to give the same branching rights to national banks and state banks. The bill, based on the recommendations made by former Comptroller of the Currency Henry May Dawes, was signed into law by President Calvin Coolidge on February 25, 1927.

It is named after Louis Thomas McFadden, member of the United States House of Representatives and Chairman of the United States House Committee on Banking and Currency.

The bill was first introduced in Congress by McFadden on February 11, 1924.

The Act sought to give national banks competitive equality with state-chartered banks by letting national banks branch to the extent permitted by state law. The McFadden Act specifically prohibited interstate branching by allowing each national bank to branch only within the state in which it is situated. Under a grandfather clause, three major banks were allowed to continue conducting interstate banking (Northwestern National Bank, First Bank Stock Corporation, and First Western Bank).

An amendment to the McFadden Act extended the Federal Reserve's charter in perpetuity.

Although the Riegle-Neal Interstate Banking and Branching Efficiency Act of 1994 repealed this provision of the McFadden Act, it specified that state law continues to control intrastate branching, or branching within a state's borders, for both state and national banks.

== See also ==
- Bank Holding Company Act of 1956
