= Office of the Comptroller of the Currency =

US federal bank regulatory agency

- Seal of the Office of the Comptroller of the Currency

- Logo of the Office of the Comptroller of the Currency

- Flag of the Comptroller of the Currency

Agency overview
- Formed: February 25, 1863; 163 years ago
- Headquarters: Constitution Center, Washington, D.C.
- Employees: 3,610 (FY 2024)
- Agency executive: Jonathan V. Gould, Comptroller of the Currency
- Parent agency: Department of the Treasury
- Website: occ.gov

The Office of the Comptroller of the Currency (OCC) is an independent bureau within the United States Department of the Treasury that was established by the National Currency Act of 1863 and serves to charter, regulate, and supervise all national banks and federal thrift institutions and the federally licensed branches and agencies of foreign banks in the United States.

The head of the agency, the comptroller of the currency, is Jonathan V. Gould, who took office on July 15, 2025.

== Duties and functions ==
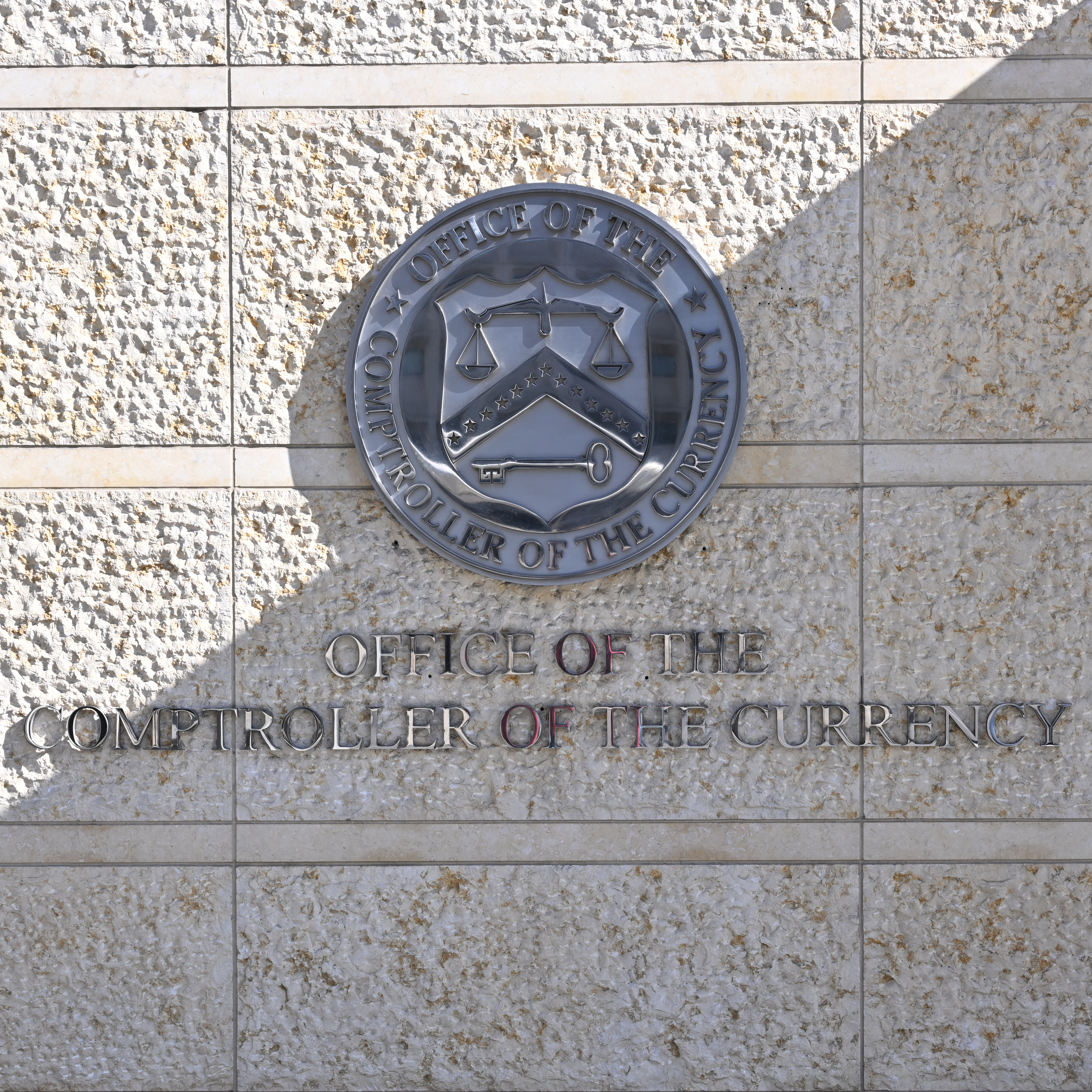
Headquarters building logo

The OCC is one of the United States' federal banking regulators, with primary prudential authority over all national banks. There are two other federal regulators, the Federal Deposit Insurance Corporation (FDIC) and the Federal Reserve. The agency is headquartered in Washington, D.C. with four district offices located in New York City, Chicago, Dallas and Denver. It is an independent bureau of the United States Department of the Treasury. The official head of the agency is the comptroller of the currency, who is appointed to a five-year term by the president with the consent of the Senate. The agency's budget is not congressionally appropriated, being paid for by assessment fees levied on regulated banks.

The OCC pursues a number of main objectives:

- to ensure the safety and soundness of the national banking system;
- to foster competition by allowing banks to offer new products and services;
- to improve the efficiency and effectiveness of OCC supervision especially to reduce the regulatory burden;
- to ensure fair and equal access to financial services to all Americans;
- to enforce anti-money laundering and anti-terrorism financing laws that apply to national banks and federally licensed branches and agencies of international banks; and
- to investigate misconduct committed by institution-affiliated parties of national banks, including officers, directors, employees, agents and independent contractors (including appraisers, attorneys and accountants).

The OCC supervises national banks, federal savings associations, and federal branches and agencies of foreign banks to ensure that they operate safely and soundly, provide fair access to financial services, treat customers fairly, and comply with applicable laws and regulations.

The OCC regulates and supervises about 1,200 national banks, federally-licensed savings associations, and federally-licensed branches of foreign banks in the United States, accounting for more than two-thirds of the total assets of all U.S. commercial banks (as of September 30, 2020).

Other financial regulatory agencies like the OCC include the FDIC (of which the comptroller serves as a director), the Federal Reserve, the Consumer Financial Protection Bureau, and the National Credit Union Administration. The OCC routinely interacts and cooperates with other government agencies, including the Consumer Financial Protection Bureau, Financial Crimes Enforcement Network, the Office of Foreign Asset Control, the Federal Bureau of Investigation, the U.S. Department of Justice, and the Department of Homeland Security.

The Comptroller serves as an ex officio board member of the Neighborhood Reinvestment Corporation, Federal Deposit Insurance Corporation, Financial Stability Oversight Council, and the Federal Financial Institutions Examination Council.

=== Preemption of state banking regulation ===
In 2003, the OCC proposed regulations to preempt virtually all state banking and financial services laws for national banks and their diverse range of non-bank, corporate operating subsidiaries. Despite opposition from the National Conference of State Legislatures, the OCC's regulations went into effect. In Watters v. Wachovia Bank, N.A. 550 U.S. 1 (2007), the United States Supreme Court validated the preemption of state regulations by the OCC, ruling that the OCC, not the states, has the authority to subject national banks to "general supervision" and "oversight":

State regulators cannot interfere with the business of banking by subjecting national banks or their OCC-licensed operating subsidiaries to multiple audits and surveillance under rival oversight regimes.

In Cuomo v. Clearing House Association, L. L. C. 557 U.S. 519 (2009), the Court clarified its decision in Watters, stating that federal banking regulations did not preempt the ability of states to enforce their own fair-lending laws, as "'general supervision and control' and 'oversight' are worlds apart from law enforcement", and therefore states retain law enforcement powers but have restricted "visitorial" powers over national banks (i.e., the right to examine the affairs of a corporation).

=== HelpWithMyBank.gov ===
In July 2007, the OCC launched HelpWithMyBank.gov to assist customers of national banks and provide answers to national banking questions.

=== Financial inclusion ===
On July 10, 2020, the OCC announced the launch of Project REACh. REACh stands for Roundtable for Economic Access and Change, and the project brings together leaders from the banking industry, national civil rights organizations, business, and technology to reduce specific barriers that prevent full, equal, and fair participation in the nation's economy.

== History ==
During the American Civil War, leaders of the U.S. federal government, including President Abraham Lincoln and Treasury Secretary Salmon P. Chase, drafted plans for a national banking system. These plans were put into action by the National Currency Act of 1863, subsequently amended by the National Bank Act, which created the Office of the Comptroller of the Currency to administer the new system. Hugh McCulloch, former president of the state-owned Bank of Indiana, was chosen to be the first comptroller of the currency.

Under the law, banks could apply to the OCC for a charter issued by the federal government. Approved banks would purchase U.S. government bonds, generating cash flow for the government. The bonds would then be deposited with the U.S. Treasury to provide security to back the paper money to be issued by the banks, a new uniform United States currency that could be redeemed for gold or silver at banks around the country. By ensuring the new currency was backed by the government-held bonds, the system gave users greater confidence in the stability of the paper money.

By 1868, the OCC had 72 staff, a third of them women. They processed charter applications and distributed currency to national banks. Until 1913, these staff were paid by distance distributed and did not have set salaries.

In 1913, the Federal Reserve Act established a central bank, the Federal Reserve, to issue American currency. The OCC's role shifted to bank examination and regulation, though it retained "currency" as part of its name. In response to the growing power of local banks, the OCC insisted on deregulating national banks in order to compete, which was realized in the McFadden Act of 1927. In 1937, the OCC signed an agreement with the Federal Reserve and the Federal Deposit Insurance Corporation to standardize the regulation of banks between the agencies.

In the 1960s, 21st comptroller James J. Saxon passed a number of controversial regulations, including one which allowed national banks to underwrite revenue bonds for the governments of states and municipalities. Many of these were later overturned in court. However, some reforms, like creating international banking and economics units and strengthening the law department, remained after his term.

The OCC was involved in the response during and after the 2008 financial crisis, including work with the Troubled Asset Relief Program (TARP), designing stress tests for major banks, and collecting and analyzing data on home mortgage loans. The Dodd–Frank Wall Street Reform and Consumer Protection Act of 2010 abolished the Office of Thrift Supervision and merged its former oversight functions into the OCC. The law also reassigned much of the OCC's former compliance mandate to the new Consumer Financial Protection Bureau. It further established the Financial Stability Oversight Council, on which the Comptroller of the Currency sits.

== Pronunciation ==
As with other uses of the English word "comptroller" there is some ambiguity about the agency's pronunciation. Historically, the word was pronounced identically to "controller," though it is increasingly pronounced as it is spelled (that is, comp-troller). According to Marketplace, former acting comptroller Keith Noreika and his successor, Joseph Otting, both used the latter pronunciation.

== List of comptrollers of the currency ==
Since 1863, the following persons have served as the comptroller of the currency:

No.	Portrait	Administrator	Took office	Left office	Notes
1		Hugh McCulloch	February 25, 1863	March 9, 1865	
2		Freeman Clarke	March 9, 1865	July 24, 1866	
3		Hiland R. Hulburd	February 1, 1867	April 3, 1872	
4		John Jay Knox Jr.	April 25, 1872	April 30, 1884	
5		Henry W. Cannon	May 12, 1884	March 1, 1886	
6		William L. Trenholm	April 20, 1886	April 30, 1889	
7		Edward S. Lacey	May 1, 1889	June 30, 1892	
8		A. Barton Hepburn	August 2, 1892	April 25, 1893	
9		James H. Eckels	April 26, 1893	December 31, 1897	
10		Charles G. Dawes	January 1, 1898	September 30, 1901	
11		William Barret Ridgely	October 1, 1901	March 28, 1908	
12		Lawrence O. Murray	April 27, 1908	April 27, 1913	
13		John Skelton Williams	February 2, 1914	March 2, 1921	
14		Daniel Richard Crissinger	March 17, 1921	March 30, 1923	
15		Henry M. Dawes	May 1, 1923	December 17, 1924	
16		Joseph W. McIntosh	December 20, 1924	November 20, 1928	
17		John W. Pole	November 21, 1928	September 20, 1932	
18		James Francis Thaddeus O'Connor	May 11, 1933	April 16, 1938	
19		Preston Delano	October 24, 1938	February 15, 1953	
20		Ray M. Gidney	April 16, 1953	November 15, 1961	
21		James J. Saxon	November 16, 1961	November 15, 1966	
22		William B. Camp	November 16, 1966	March 23, 1973	
acting		Justin T. Watson	March 24, 1973	July 4, 1973	
23		James E. Smith	July 5, 1973	July 31, 1976	
acting		Robert L. Bloom	August 1, 1976	July 20, 1977	
24		John G. Heimann	July 21, 1977	May 15, 1981	
acting		Charles Lord	May 16, 1981	December 16, 1981	
25		C. T. Conover	December 16, 1981	May 4, 1985	
–		H. Joe Selby	May 5, 1985	December 1, 1985	
26		Robert L. Clarke	December 2, 1985	February 29, 1992	
acting		Stephen Steinbrink	March 1, 1992	April 5, 1993	
27		Eugene Ludwig	April 5, 1993	April 3, 1998	
acting		Julie L. Williams	April 4, 1998	December 8, 1998	
28		John D. Hawke Jr.	December 8, 1998	October 13, 2004	
acting		Julie L. Williams	October 14, 2004	August 4, 2005	
29		John Cunningham Dugan	August 4, 2005	August 14, 2010	
acting		John G. Walsh	August 15, 2010	April 9, 2012	
30		Thomas J. Curry	April 9, 2012	May 5, 2017	
acting		Keith Noreika	May 5, 2017	November 27, 2017	
31		Joseph Otting	November 27, 2017	May 29, 2020	
acting		Brian P. Brooks	May 29, 2020	January 14, 2021	
acting		Blake Paulson	January 14, 2021	May 10, 2021	
acting		Michael J. Hsu	May 10, 2021	February 10, 2025	
acting		Rodney E. Hood	February 10, 2025	July 15, 2025	
32		Jonathan V. Gould	July 15, 2025	Present	

== See also ==
- Bank regulation in the United States
- Title 12 of the Code of Federal Regulations
- Volcker Rule
- List of financial supervisory authorities by country

== Bibliography ==
- Office of the Comptroller of the Currency (November 2011). A Short History (PDF).
- Perkins, David W (December 28, 2020). Bank Supervision by Federal Regulators: Overview and Policy Issues (PDF) (Report). Congressional Research Service. R46648.
