= Henry M. Dawes =

American businessman and banker

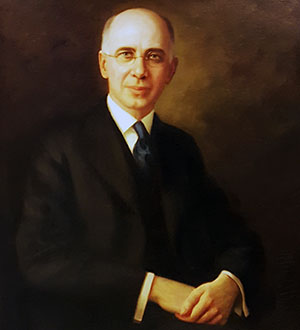

Comptroller of the Currency
- In office May 1, 1923 - December 17, 1924
- President: Warren G. Harding; Calvin Coolidge
- Preceded by: Daniel Richard Crissinger
- Succeeded by: Joseph W. McIntosh

Personal details
- Born: April 22, 1877 Marietta, Ohio
- Died: September 29, 1952 (aged 75) Evanston, Illinois
- Spouse: Helen Moore Curtis
- Parent(s): Rufus Dawes; Mary Beman Gates
- Occupation: Banker, businessman

Henry May Dawes (April 22, 1877 – September 29, 1952) was an American businessman and banker from a prominent Ohio family. He served as a United States Comptroller of the Currency from 1923 to 1924 and also worked as an executive in the oil industry.

Dawes was born in Marietta, Ohio, the youngest son of American Civil War brevet Brigadier General Rufus R. Dawes and great-great-grandson of American Revolution hero William Dawes. His brothers Charles, Rufus, and Beman also gained national and international prominence in politics and business. Henry M. Dawes graduated from Marietta College and entered business. He married Helen Moore Curtis of Coshocton, Ohio, in 1905.

Dawes was an Illinois banker and businessman when he was named Comptroller by President Warren G. Harding in 1923. Although he held office for only 19 months, Dawes carried out a nationwide effort to gather recommendations from national bank officials and other experts for changes in the banking laws. With the assistance of a volunteer committee of national bankers, Dawes drafted proposals that were submitted to Congress. The Dawes recommendations resulted in the McFadden Act, enacted under his successor.

Dawes returned to the oil industry after his term, as president of Pure Oil Company from 1924 to 1952. In 1936, along with other oil company executives, he was indicted and stood trial for violations of the Sherman Antitrust Act. Acquitted, he resumed his civic duties, serving as Program Committee Chair for the Economic Club of Chicago from 1939 until 1940, as well as on its board of directors, along with his brother Rufus. He died on September 29, 1952, in Evanston, Illinois.

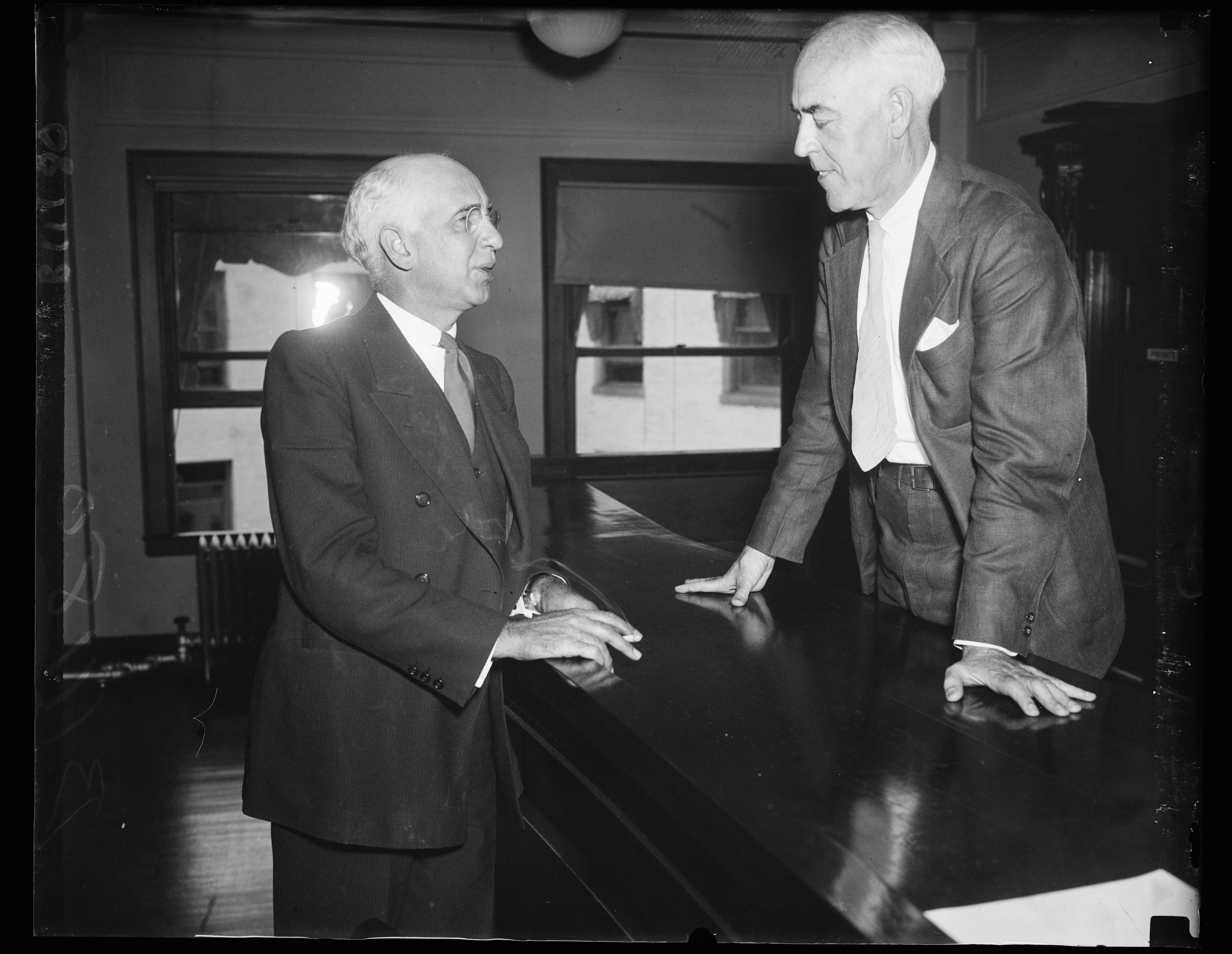

Former "Red Eye w/ Greg Gutfeld" personality (Fox News Channel) Bill Schulz is Henry Dawes's great-grandson.
