= John D. Hawke Jr. =

American lawyer and comptroller (1933–2022)

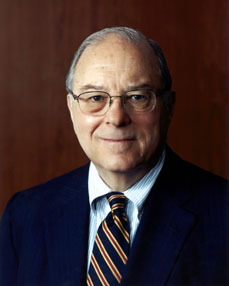
- John D. Hawke Jr.

Under Secretary of the Treasury for Domestic Finance
- In office 1995–1998
- President: Bill Clinton
- Preceded by: Frank N. Newman
- Succeeded by: Gary Gensler

28th Comptroller of the Currency
- In office December 8, 1998 – October 13, 2004
- President: Bill Clinton; George W. Bush
- Preceded by: Eugene Ludwig
- Succeeded by: John C. Dugan

Personal details
- Born: June 29, 1933 New York City, New York, U.S.
- Died: January 3, 2022 (aged 88) Washington, D.C., U.S.
- Spouse: Marie R. Hawke (deceased)
- Education: Yale University (B.A.); Columbia University (J.D.)

Military service
- Branch/service: United States Air Force
- Years of service: 1955–1957

John D. Hawke Jr. (June 29, 1933 – January 3, 2022) was an American lawyer who served as the United States Under Secretary of the Treasury for Domestic Finance from 1995 to 1998, and was the United States Comptroller of the Currency from 1998 to 2004.

== Personal history ==
John D. Hawke Jr. was born in New York City on June 26, 1933. He was graduated from Yale University in 1954 with a B.A. in English. From 1955 to 1957 he served on active duty with the U.S. Air Force. After graduating in 1960 from Columbia University School of Law, Hawke was a law clerk for Judge E. Barrett Prettyman on the United States Court of Appeals for the District of Columbia Circuit. From 1961 to 1962 he served as counsel to the Select Subcommittee on Education in the U.S. House of Representatives. Hawke joined the Washington, D.C., law firm of Arnold & Porter as an associate in 1962 and later became a senior partner. In 1975 he left the firm to serve as general counsel to the Board of Governors of the Federal Reserve System, returning in 1978. From 1987 to 1995 he served as chairman of the firm.

From 1970 to 1987 Hawke taught courses on federal regulation of banking at the Georgetown University Law Center. He has also taught courses on bank acquisitions and financial regulation and served as the chairman of the Board of Advisors of the Morin Center for Banking Law Studies. In 1987 Hawke served as a member of a committee of inquiry appointed by the Chicago Mercantile Exchange to study the role of futures markets in connection with the stock market crash in October of that year.

He was a founding member of the Shadow Financial Regulatory Committee and served on the committee until joining the Treasury Department in April 1995. Hawke served for 3½ years as Under Secretary of the Treasury for Domestic Finance. In that capacity he oversaw the development of policy and legislation in the areas of financial institutions, debt management, and capital markets. After serving as Comptroller of the Currency, 1998–2004, Hawke returned to private practice with the well-connected Washington, D.C. law firm of Arnold & Porter.

Hawke died from cancer in Washington, D.C., on January 3, 2022, at the age of 88.

== Comptroller of the Currency, 1998–2004 ==
Hawke was sworn in as the 28th Comptroller of the Currency on December 8, 1998. After serving for 10 months under a recess appointment, he was sworn in for a full five-year term as Comptroller on October 13, 1999.

During his term as Comptroller, Hawke has stressed the importance of the safety and soundness of national banks through such supervisory initiatives as Project Canary (an "early warning" system) and the "Supervision in the Future", which makes extensive use of technology.

He has introduced management and budget reforms in the internal operations of the Office of the Comptroller of the Currency as well as programs designed to increase workplace diversity.

=== Supervisory structure ===
The disparity between the supervisory fees that state and national banks pay has been a priority during Hawke's tenure, and he has emphasized reducing regulation on national banks. His community bank initiative stresses streamlined supervision and increased outreach.

== Publications ==
Hawke has written extensively on matters relating to the regulation of financial institutions and is the author of Commentaries on Banking Regulation, published in 1985.

Government offices
Preceded by Frank N. Newman	Under Secretary of the Treasury for Domestic Finance; 1995–1998	Succeeded by Gary Gensler
Preceded by Eugene Ludwig	Comptroller of the Currency; 1998–2004	Succeeded by John C. Dugan
