= Jonathan Gould (lawyer) =

32nd Comptroller of the Currency

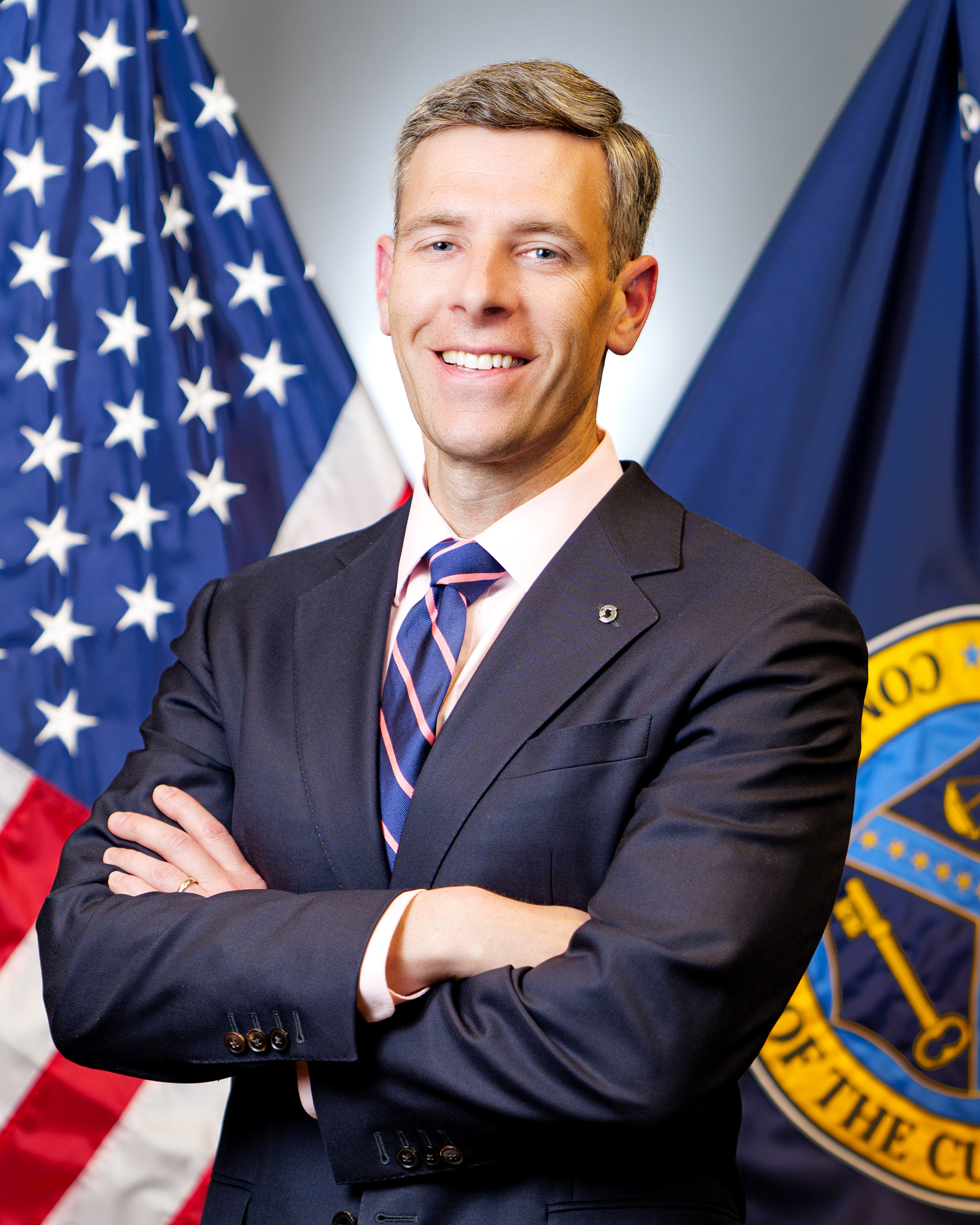
- Gould in 2025

Comptroller of the Currency
- Incumbent
- Assumed office July 15, 2025
- President: Donald Trump
- Preceded by: Rodney E. Hood (acting)

Personal details
- Education: Princeton University (BA); Washington and Lee University (JD)

Jonathan V. Gould is an American lawyer who is the comptroller of the currency since 2025. He has worked for Alston & Bird, Promontory Financial Group, BlackRock, Jones Day, and for the U.S. Senate Committee on Banking, Housing, and Urban Affairs.

== Biography ==
Gould graduated from Princeton University with a Bachelor of Arts cum laude. He later attended Washington and Lee University where he received his Juris Doctor degree as part of the class of 2001.

In 2001, Gould began his career, working as an associate for the firm Alston & Bird through 2005. Afterwards, he was employed by the U.S. Senate Committee on Banking, Housing, and Urban Affairs from 2005 to 2008 as a counsel. He then served as the director of the Promontory Financial Group from 2008 to 2014, where he "advised clients on bank regulatory issues". Gould later served as a director for the investment company BlackRock from 2014 to 2018.

Gould returned to the Senate Committee on Banking, Housing, and Urban Affairs in February 2018, becoming the committee's chief counsel. On December 24, 2018, he was appointed the senior deputy comptroller and the chief counsel in the Office of the Comptroller of the Currency (OCC). He served under Comptroller Joseph Otting and remained in his position at the OCC until June 2021, having served several months into the Joe Biden administration. Gould returned to law in February 2022, first joining Bitfury, a blockchain firm, as its chief legal officer before becoming a partner at Jones Day, a law firm, in September the same year.

In February 2025, Gould was announced by President Donald Trump as the nominee to serve as Comptroller of the Currency. He was confirmed by the Senate on July 10, 2025, in a 50 to 45 vote, taking office five days later on July 15, 2025 as the 32nd comptroller.
