= Thomas J. Curry =

30th Comptroller of the Currency

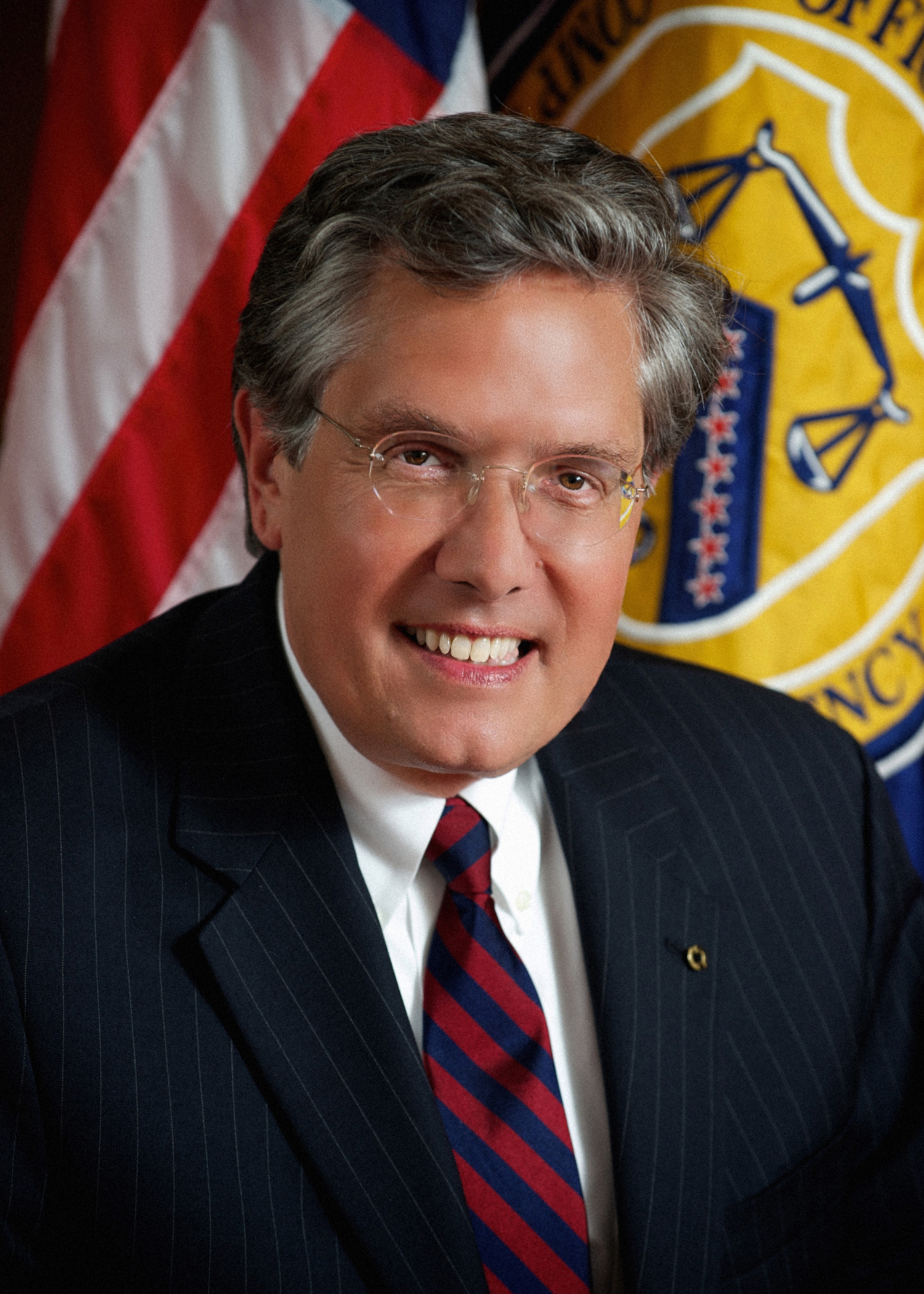

30th Comptroller of the Currency
- In office April 9, 2012 – May 5, 2017
- President: Barack Obama; Donald Trump
- Preceded by: John C. Dugan
- Succeeded by: Joseph Otting

Personal details
- Born: January 9, 1957 (age 69) Greenwich, Connecticut

Thomas James Curry (born January 9, 1957) is an American government official who served as the 30th Comptroller of the Currency of the United States from April 9, 2012, until May 5, 2017. Prior to becoming Comptroller of the Currency, Curry served as a Director of the Federal Deposit Insurance Corporation (FDIC) and as the chairman of the NeighborWorks America Board of Directors. He was born in Greenwich, Connecticut and raised in Stamford, Connecticut.

Prior to joining the FDIC's board of directors, Curry served as Commissioner of Banks for the Commonwealth of Massachusetts from 1990 to 1991 and from 1995 to 2003. He served as Acting Commissioner from February 1994 to June 1995. Previously, he served as First Deputy Commissioner and Assistant General Counsel within the Massachusetts Division of Banks. He entered state government in 1982 as an attorney with the Massachusetts' Secretary of State's Office.

Curry served as the Chairman of the Conference of State Bank Supervisors from 2000 to 2001, and served two terms on the State Liaison Committee of the Federal Financial Institutions Examination Council, including a term as Committee chairman. On April 1, 2013, Curry was named chairman of the Federal Financial Institutions Examination Council (FFIEC) for a two-year term.

He is a 1978 graduate of Manhattan College, summa cum laude, where he was elected to Phi Beta Kappa. He received his J.D. degree from the New England School of Law.

Curry's tenure as Comptroller of the Currency ended on May 5, 2017. He was succeeded by Acting Comptroller of the Currency Keith A. Noreika.

Curry is a partner at Boston law firm Nutter McClennen & Fish LLP in the Corporate and Transactions Department. He is a co-leader of the firm's Banking and Financial Services group. In January 2021, he was elected to be a member of the Board of Directors of the Federal Home Loan Bank of Boston.

Government offices
Preceded by John C. Dugan	Comptroller of the Currency; 2012–2017	Succeeded by Joseph Otting
