= Joseph Otting =

American businessman (born 1957)

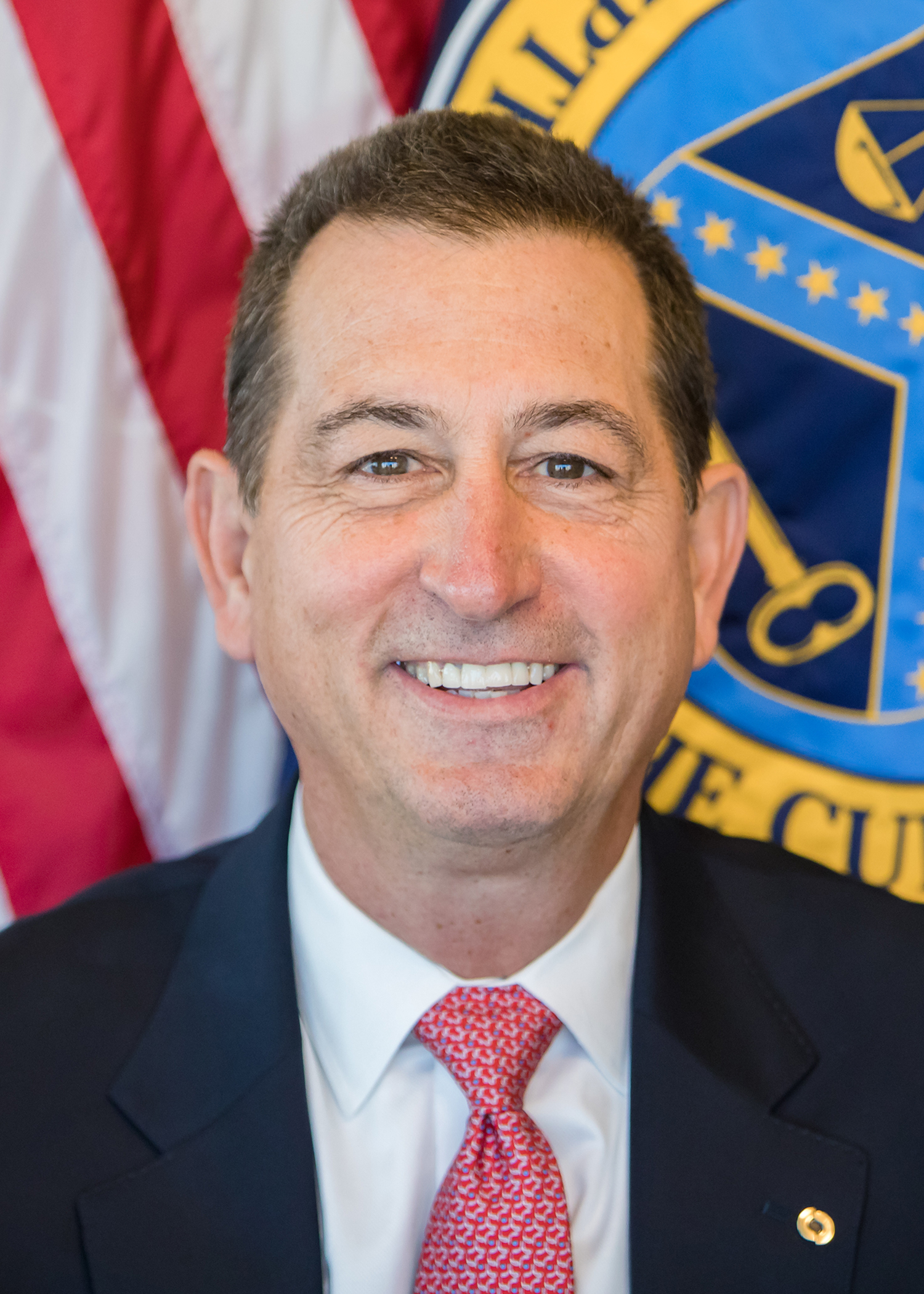
- Official portrait

31st Comptroller of the Currency
- In office November 27, 2017 – May 29, 2020
- President: Donald Trump
- Preceded by: Thomas J. Curry
- Succeeded by: Jonathan Gould (2025)

Director of the Federal Housing Finance Agency
- Acting; January 6, 2019 – April 9, 2019
- President: Donald Trump
- Preceded by: Mel Watt
- Succeeded by: Mark Calabria

Personal details
- Born: 1957 (age 68–69) Maquoketa, Iowa, U.S.
- Education: University of Northern Iowa (BA)

Joseph Michael Otting (born 1957) is an American businessman and government official. He served as the 31st Comptroller of the Currency from November 27, 2017 to May 29, 2020.

== Early life and education ==
Otting grew up in Maquoketa, Iowa, the son of Grace and James Otting.

He holds a Bachelor of Arts degree in management from the University of Northern Iowa, which he received in 1981. He is also a graduate of the School of Credit and Financial Management, a multi-year program that includes four-weeks of classroom instruction offered by the National Association of Credit Management, which was held at Dartmouth College at the time he attended in 1992.

== Career ==
=== Bank of America and Union Bank ===
Otting started his career at Bank of America, where he held positions in branch management, preferred banking, and commercial lending. From 1986 to 2001, Otting was with Union Bank, where he held roles including deputy regional vice president, senior vice president, executive vice president, and group head of commercial banking.

=== U.S. Bank ===
Between 2001 and 2010, Otting worked for U.S. Bank, a subsidiary of U.S. Bancorp. Otting served as Market President of U.S. Bank in Oregon from December 2001 to June 2003 and as Executive Vice President and Manager of East Region Commercial Banking Group from June 2003 to April 2005. Until his departure in 2010, he served as one of eight Vice Chairman, as the head of the Commercial Banking Group. In addition, during his tenure, he led U.S. Bank's efforts in California as the senior executive responsible for expansion in the region.

=== OneWest Bank ===
Otting was president, CEO, and a board member of OneWest Bank, N.A., from October 2010 until August 2015, when the bank merged with CIT Group, which purchased OneWest Bank for $3.4 billion, following regulatory approval. He served as President of CIT Bank and co-president of CIT Group from August 2015 to December 2015.

At OneWest, he worked closely with the bank's founder, Steven Mnuchin, who later became the U.S. Secretary of the Treasury. Mnuchin led a group that purchased the California-based residential lender, IndyMac Federal Bank, FSB, on March 19, 2009, from the FDIC to create OneWest, FSB, with the intent of turning around the failed bank. The FDIC established IndyMac Federal Bank, FSB, in 2008 when IndyMac Bank, F.S.B., failed and oversaw its operations through the sale which created OneWest, FSB. OneWest Bank, FSB, converted to a national bank and was renamed OneWest Bank, N.A., in February 2014, as the bank transitioned from a residential lender to a full-service bank.

In 2011, Otting signed a consent order, in conjunction with 14 other large bank mortgage servicers, with the U.S. Office of Thrift Supervision regarding the bank's mortgage servicing and foreclosure practices. The OCC terminated that order on July 21, 2015, after determining that the bank “satisfied the terms of the 2011 foreclosure-related consent order” and completed the independent foreclosure review in accordance with the requirements included in the original 2011 order. OneWest did not enter into a payment agreement with the OCC, and in April 2014, the OCC published a report showing that an independent consultant found a relatively low error rate in the bank's mortgage and foreclosure activity covered by the regulator's order. When Otting left CIT in December 2015, the Wall Street Journal calculated that he earned $24.9 million in compensation for 2015, including a $12 million severance payment.

During the merger of OneWest and CIT, consumer advocates who protested against approval of the merger clashed with bank supporters, based on the community redevelopment and reinvestment activities of the bank.

In May 2017, the U.S. Department of Justice reached an $89 million settlement with CIT involving a portfolio of reverse mortgage products acquired from the failed IndyMac Federal Bank and compliance with HUD foreclosure requirements, which requires banks to complete resolution and foreclosure activities within an aggressive timeline.

=== Flagstar Financial (formerly New York Community Bancorp) ===
On March 7, 2024, Otting was announced as the new CEO of New York Community Bancorp, Inc, parent company of Flagstar Bank. NYCB was renamed Flagstar Financial in October 2024. Otting serves as Executive Chairman, President, and chief executive officer of Flagstar Financial, Inc. and of its bank subsidiary, Flagstar Bank, N.A. He was appointed Executive Chairman of both the Company and the Bank Boards effective June 5, 2024. He has served as president and chief executive officer of the Company and the Bank since April 1, 2024.

== Comptroller of the Currency ==
Flag of the United States Comptroller of the Currency

On June 5, 2017, President Donald Trump nominated Otting to become the Comptroller of the Currency, responsible for overseeing federally-chartered banks, savings associations, and federal branches of foreign banks operating in the United States. The U.S. Senate confirmed him on November 16, 2017, and he was sworn in on November 27, 2017.

The Comptroller of the Currency is the administrator of the federal banking system and chief officer of the Office of the Comptroller of the Currency (OCC). The OCC supervises nearly 1,400 national banks, federal savings associations, and federal branches and agencies of foreign banks operating in the United States. The mission of the OCC is to ensure that national banks and federal savings associations operate in a safe and sound manner, provide fair access to financial services, treat customers fairly, and comply with applicable laws and regulations.

The Comptroller also serves as a director of the Federal Deposit Insurance Corporation and member of the Financial Stability Oversight Council and the Federal Financial Institutions Examination Council.

During his July 27, 2017, confirmation hearing before the United States Senate Committee on Banking, Housing, and Urban Affairs, Otting voiced support for simplifying regulatory capital requirements and for bank's ability to provide short-term, small-dollar loans, which in his view had been pushed out of the federal banking system by previous regulatory action.

During his swearing-in ceremony, Otting stressed that his priorities include job creation and economic discrimination, reducing regulations, enhancing the value of the federal charter, and ensuring the OCC operates as effectively and efficiently as possible.

In his first testimony as Comptroller, Otting discussed his main priorities, which included modernizing the Community Reinvestment Act; encouraging banks to meet the short-term, small-dollar needs of their customers; making Bank Secrecy Act compliance work more efficiently; simplifying regulatory capital and Volcker Rule; and helping the OCC operate as efficiently and effectively as possible.

On May 23, 2018, the OCC published a bulletin promoting short-term, small-dollar installment loans to encourage national banks and federal savings association to help meet the credit needs of their customers.

On July 31, 2018, Otting his decision to begin accepting applications for national bank charters from non-depository financial technology (fintech) companies engaged in the business of banking. "The decision to consider applications for special purpose national bank charters from innovative companies helps provide more choices to consumers and businesses, and creates greater opportunity for companies that want to provide banking services in America," said Comptroller Otting. "Companies that provide banking services in innovative ways deserve the opportunity to pursue that business on a national scale as a federally chartered, regulated bank." Federal preemption applies to state law regarding federally chartered banks.

On August 28, 2018, Otting announced that the OCC released an Advance Notice of Proposed Rulemaking to solicit input on the best ways to modernize the regulations implementing the Community Reinvestment Act (CRA). On December 12, 2019, the FDIC and the OCC announced a proposed rule to strengthen and modernize CRA regulations, which may require large banks "to lend more in poor areas under the new rules."

On May 20, 2020, the OCC finalized the updates to the 1977 Community Reinvestment Act. On that same day, the OCC and other federal financial regulators published principles for offering small-dollar loans in a responsible manner to meet financial institutions customers’ short-term credit needs. Although community and industry groups agree that the CRA, which has gone without major updates since 1995, is in need of updates, groups from both camps were critical of Otting's proposed changes. Community groups such as the National Community Reinvestment Coalition expressed concerns that the changes would lead to reduced lending in low- and middle-income communities. Industry groups like the American Bankers Association and Independent Community Bankers of America worried about the complexity of the updates and the lack of agreement between the OCC and the FDIC and Federal Reserve, all of which share responsibility for enforcing the CRA, on the rule changes. Otting's proposed changes would go into effect on January 1, 2023, and would expand the criteria under which banking activities qualify as serving low-income communities. For example, a $500,000 mortgage in an area where the average mortgage size is $1 million could qualify as low- or moderate-income lending. Otting was the CEO of OneWest when the bank sought approval to merge with CIT, a process that was complicated by the bank's history of noncompliance with the CRA. Regulators approved the merger only after both banks pledged to increase their lending in low-income communities. Congresswoman Maxine Waters commented that Otting's efforts to weaken the CRA were likely informed by the challenges the law presented to the merger he presided over at OneWest.

In May 2020, it was reported that Otting would resign as Comptroller of the Currency, upon the finalization of the updates to the 1977 Community Reinvestment Act. He formally announced his resignation on May 21, 2020.

== Federal Housing Finance Agency ==
On December 21, 2018, President Donald J. Trump designated Otting to be the acting director of the Federal Housing Finance Agency (FHFA) upon completion of current Director Mel Watt's term.

== Personal life ==
Otting has played significant roles in charitable and community development organizations. He has served as a board member for the California Chamber of Commerce, the Killebrew-Thompson Memorial foundation, the Associated Oregon Industries, the Oregon Business Council, the Portland Business Alliance, the Minnesota Chamber of Commerce, and Blue Cross Blue Shield of Oregon. He was also a member of the Financial Services Roundtable, the Los Angeles Chamber of Commerce, and the Board and executive committee of the Los Angeles Economic Development Corporation.

His interests include golf, tennis, cross-training and reading. Mr. Otting resides in Cold Spring Harbor, NY.

In 2018, while living in Las Vegas, Otting also co-owned Southern Highlands Golf Club, Tennis Facility, and Spa.

Government offices
Preceded by Thomas Curry	Comptroller of the Currency; 2017–2020	Succeeded by Brian P. Brooks (Acting)
