= Charles E. Dietrich =

American politician

Member of the U.S. House of Representatives from Pennsylvania's 15th district
- In office January 3, 1935 – January 3, 1937
- Preceded by: Louis T. McFadden
- Succeeded by: Albert G. Rutherford

Personal details
- Born: Charles Elmer Dietrich; July 30, 1889 Tunkhannock, Pennsylvania, U.S.
- Died: May 20, 1942 (aged 52) Tunkhannock, Pennsylvania, U.S.
- Resting place: Sunnyside Cemetery
- Party: Democratic

Charles Elmer Dietrich (July 30, 1889 – May 20, 1942) was a Democratic member of the U.S. House of Representatives from Pennsylvania for one term from 1935 to 1937.

== Early life and career ==
Charles E. Dietrich was born in Tunkhannock, Pennsylvania. He graduated from Wyoming Seminary in Kingston, Pennsylvania, in 1907.

He owned and operated a theater from 1914 to 1942. He was engaged in agricultural pursuits from 1924 to 1942. He served as prothonotary and clerk of the courts of Wyoming County, Pennsylvania, from 1920 to 1935. He was a delegate to the 1932 Democratic National Convention.

== Congress ==
In 1934 Dietrich defeated disgraced incumbent Louis T. McFadden and was the only Democrat to win the 15th district between 1912 and 1950. He was an unsuccessful candidate for reelection in 1936.

== Later career and death ==
He resumed former business pursuits, and died in Tunkhannock. Interment in Sunnyside Cemetery.

== Sources ==
- United States Congress. "Charles E. Dietrich (id: D000340)". Biographical Directory of the United States Congress.
- The Political Graveyard

U.S. House of Representatives
Preceded by Louis Thomas McFadden	Member of the U.S. House of Representatives from Pennsylvania's 15th congressional district 1935–1937	Succeeded by Albert G. Rutherford
