= Albert G. Rutherford =

American politician

Albert Rutherford
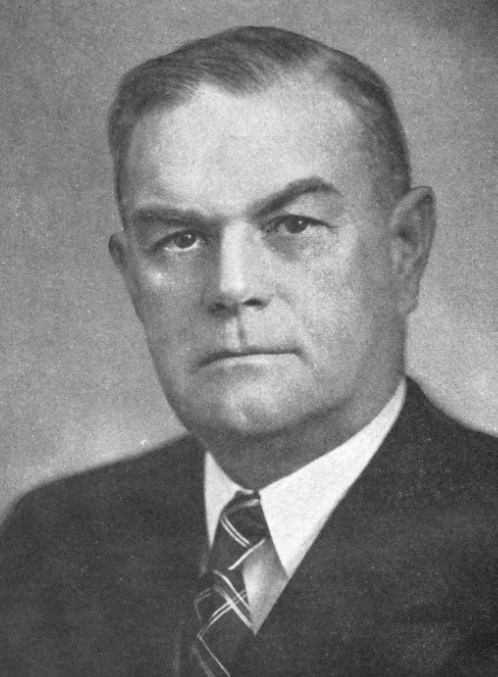

Member of the U.S. House of Representatives from Pennsylvania's 15th district
- In office January 3, 1937 – August 10, 1941
- Preceded by: Charles E. Dietrich
- Succeeded by: Wilson D. Gillette

Personal details
- Born: Albert Greig Rutherford; January 3, 1879 Watford, Ontario, Canada
- Died: August 10, 1941 (aged 62) Washington, D.C., U.S.
- Party: Republican

Albert Grieg Rutherford (January 3, 1879 – August 10, 1941) was an American lawyer and politician who was elected to three terms as a Republican member of the U.S. House of Representatives from Pennsylvania, serving from 1937 until his death in 1941.

== Biography ==
Albert G. Rutherford was born in Watford, Ontario, Canada. He immigrated to the United States in 1883 with his parents, who settled in Carbondale, Pennsylvania. He attended Blair Academy in Blairstown, NJ, and the Scranton-Lackawanna Business College. He graduated from the University of Pennsylvania Law School at Philadelphia in 1904, where he became a member of the Delta Chi fraternity.

=== Early career ===
He served as deputy prothonotary of Lackawanna County, Pennsylvania, from 1907 to 1914. He moved to Honesdale, Pennsylvania, in 1918 and continued the practice of law. He enlisted in the Pennsylvania National Guard in 1904, and served as a lieutenant colonel of the Second Pennsylvania Reserve Militia in 1918.

=== Congress ===
Rutherford was elected as a Republican to the Seventy-fifth, Seventy-sixth, and Seventy-seventh Congresses and served until his death.

=== Death ===
Rutherford died in Washington, D.C. on August 10, 1941.

== See also ==
- List of members of the United States Congress who died in office (1900–1949)

== Sources ==
- United States Congress. "Albert G. Rutherford (id: R000546)". Biographical Directory of the United States Congress.
- The Political Graveyard

U.S. House of Representatives
Preceded by Charles E. Dietrich	Member of the U.S. House of Representatives from Pennsylvania's 15th congressional district 1937–1941	Succeeded by Wilson D. Gillette
