= John Cunningham Dugan =

American attorney (born 1955)

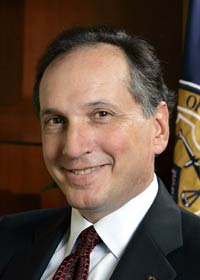

29th Comptroller of the Currency
- In office August 4, 2005 – August 14, 2010
- President: George W. Bush; Barack Obama
- Preceded by: John D. Hawke, Jr.
- Succeeded by: Thomas J. Curry

Personal details
- Born: June 3, 1955 (age 71) Washington, D.C., U.S.
- Children: 2
- Education: University of Michigan (BA); Harvard University (JD)
- Occupation: Former Chairman of Citigroup; Lead Independent Director

John Cunningham Dugan (born June 3, 1955) is an American corporate executive, attorney, and former government official who served as the 29th comptroller of the currency from August 2005 to August 14, 2010. He has since worked as the chairman of Citigroup.

== Early life and education ==
Dugan was born in Washington, D.C. He earned a Bachelor of Arts degree from the University of Michigan and a Juris Doctor from Harvard Law School.

== Career ==
In September 2007, Dugan was appointed chairman of the Joint Forum, which is a group of senior financial sector regulators from the United States, Canada, Europe, Japan, and Australia that deals with issues common to the banking, securities, and insurance industries, including supervision of conglomerates.

Dugan was appointed as under secretary of the treasury for domestic finance in 1992 and served in Department of the Treasury from 1989 to 1993. Before that he was minority counsel and minority general counsel for the United States Senate Committee on Banking, Housing, and Urban Affairs, from 1985 to 1989. He was also director of Minbanc, a charitable organization, and was a member of the American Bar Association's committee on banking law. Before serving as comptroller, Dugan worked for 12 years as a lobbyist representing the banking industry.

Dugan acted as chairman of the Joint Forum on the Basel Committee on Banking Supervision from 2007 through December 2009.

In 2023, Dugan also the chairman of the International Monetary Conference.

In October, 2025, upon the election of Jane Fraser as Chairman, Dugan assumed the role of Lead Independent Director at Citi.

== Personal life ==
As of 2010, Dugan is married and has two children.

Government offices
Preceded by John D. Hawke, Jr.	Comptroller of the Currency; 2005–2010	Succeeded by Thomas J. Curry
Business positions
Preceded by Michael E. O'Neill	Chairman of Citigroup; 2019–2025	Succeeded by Jane Fraser
