= Riegle-Neal Interstate Banking and Branching Efficiency Act of 1994 =

US banking legislation

- Long title: An Act to amend the Bank Holding Company Act of 1956, the Revised Statutes of the United States, and the Federal Deposit Insurance Act to provide for interstate banking and branching.
- Enacted by: the 103rd United States Congress

Citations
- Public law: Pub. L. 103-328
- Statutes at Large: 108 Stat. 2338

Legislative history
- Introduced in the House as H.R. 3841 by Stephen L. Neal on February 10, 1994; Signed into law by President Bill Clinton on September 29, 1994

An Act To amend the Bank Holding Company Act of 1956, the Revised Statutes of the United States, and the Federal Deposit Insurance Act to provide for interstate banking and branching, more commonly known by its short title, the Riegle-Neal Interstate Banking and Branching Efficiency Act of 1994, (IBBEA) amended the laws of the United States governing federally chartered banks in order to restore the laws' competitiveness with the recently relaxed laws governing state-chartered banks. The goal was the return to a balance between the benefits of a state bank charter versus a federal bank charter. Among other notable changes, the Act stipulated that a federally chartered bank wishing to expand must first undergo a review of its Community Reinvestment Act compliance. Congress approved the bill by September 14, 1994. The bill was signed by Bill Clinton on September 29, 1994.

== Expansion of the Community Reinvestment Act ==
Three sections of the IBBEA address and expand the Community Reinvestment Act: Section 107, Section 109, and Section 110. Section 110 amends the Community Reinvestment Act itself to include a new section regarding the method of evaluating the compliance of banks with branches in more than one state.

== Effect ==
Newly formed firms used less outside debt financing and invested less, suggesting that greater banking competition increased financial constraints for these firms. These effects diminished and ultimately reversed as firms aged.

== Usage in popular media ==
- It was referenced by Chuck McGill in Season 2, Episode 8 ("Fifi") of Better Call Saul.
