= List of Marietta College alumni =

Marietta College is a private liberal arts college in Marietta, Ohio. Following are some of its notable alumni.

== Art ==
Name	Class	Major	Notability	References
Theodore Earl Butler			American impressionist	
Charles L. Peterson			Artist	

== Business ==
Name	Class	Major	Notability	References
Henry M. Dawes	1896		President of Pure Oil Company of United States Comptroller of the Currency	
Bart Gullong	1970		Developed and marketed QuikClot, a hemostatic dressing designed to rapidly control bleeding	
Douglas Putnam	1859		President of Lexington and Big Sandy Railroad Co. and Ashland Coal & Iron Railway; U.S. Army colonel and member of Ulysses S. Grant's staff	
Mike Salvino	1987	Industrial Engineering	President and chairperson of DXC Technology	

== Clergy ==
Name	Class	Major	Notability	References
Obed Dickinson			Congregational minister and abolitionist	
Dean Hess	1941		Clergyman, soldier, and humanitarian	
Edward Marsden			Minister and missionary to the Tlingit community of Saxman	
John Poage Williamson			Missionary to the Lower Sioux Agency and Crow Creek Indian Reservation; South Dakota House of Representatives	

== Education ==
Name	Class	Major	Notability	References
Kenneth P. Bogart	1965	Mathematics	Mathematician and professor at Dartmouth College	
Edmund Burke Fairfield			Chancellor of the University of Nebraska and lieutenant governor of Michigan	
John Fantuzzo			Professor of Human Relations at the University of Pennsylvania and director of the Penn Child Research Center	
Doug La Follette	1963	Chemistry	Academic, environmental scientist, and secretary of state of Wisconsin	
Scott Lephart		Sports Medicine	Dean of the University of Kentucky College of Health Sciences and sports medicine scholar	
John Nesselroade			Professor of psychology at the University of Virginia and adjunct professor of human development at Pennsylvania State University	
Elsie Eaton Newton			Dean of Women at Marietta and educator with the United States Indian Service	
Wilbur Schramm	1928		Academic and founding father of the Communication Studies discipline	

== Entertainment ==
Name	Class	Major	Notability	References
Nick Gehlfuss	2007		Actor	
Gary Kott	1969		Television and advertising writer, and producer	

== Law ==
Name	Class	Major	Notability	References
James H. Brown			Justice of the Supreme Court of Appeals of West Virginia	
Martin Dewey Follett			Associate justice of the Ohio Supreme Court	
Joseph McCormick			Ohio attorney general, lawyer, and participant in the second Ohio Constitutional Convention	
Chuck McRae			Justice of the Supreme Court of Mississippi	
Steven Sadow			Criminal defense attorney	
Riley E. Stratton			Justice of the Oregon Supreme Court	
Joseph G. Wilson	1846		Justice on the Oregon Supreme Court and United States House of Representatives	

== Literature and journalism ==
Name	Class	Major	Notability	References
Kathy Brodsky	1967		Author and poet	
Rich Galen	1968		Columnist, press secretary, and Republican strategist	
Joyce Harrington	1953		Novelist	
Joy Williams	1963		Novelist, short story writer, and essayist	

== Military ==
Name	Class	Major	Notability	References
William H. Nash	1854		Attended, 1850–1852; US Army brigadier general	
Douglas Putnam	1859		U.S. Army colonel and member of Ulysses S. Grant's staff, president of Lexington and Big Sandy Railroad Co. and Ashland Coal & Iron Railway	
Walter Cowen Short	1888		U.S. Army brigadier general	

== Politics ==
Name	Class	Major	Notability	References
Edward H. Allen			Mayor of Kansas City, Missouri	
Ray Barnhart	1959		Federal Highway Administration director and Texas House of Representatives	
James Capehart			United States House of Representatives	
Eldon Jacob Crull	1881		Montana House of Representatives	
Beman Gates Dawes			United States House of Representatives	
Charles G. Dawes	1884		U.S. vice president, Nobel Peace Prize recipient, and ambassador	
Henry M. Dawes			United States Comptroller of the Currency and president of Pure Oil Company	
Rufus Dawes			United States House of Representatives	
Frank Deem			West Virginia Senate and West Virginia House of Delegates	
Edmund Burke Fairfield			Lieutenant governor of Michigan and chancellor of the University of Nebraska	
John F. Follett			United States House of Representatives	
Glen Gainer Jr.			State auditor of West Virginia	
Carte Goodwin	1996		United States Senate	
Amy Grady			West Virginia Senate	
William Irwin	1848		Governor of California	
Doug La Follette			Secretary of state of Wisconsin, academic, and environmental scientist	
Isaac Naylor			Mayor of Dallas	
Henry S. Neal			United States House of Representatives	
C. William O'Neill	1938		Governor of Ohio	
John Patterson			Ohio House of Representatives	
Joel Pritchard			United States House of Representatives and lieutenant governor of Washington	
John M. Stowell			Wisconsin State Assembly and mayor of Milwaukee	
Willard Warner	1845		United States Senate	
Albert B. White			Governor of West Virginia	
Wilbur M. White			United States House of Representatives	
John Poage Williamson			South Dakota House of Representatives and Lower Sioux Agency and Crow Creek Indian Reservation missionary	
Joseph G. Wilson	1846		United States House of Representatives and justice on the Oregon Supreme Court	

== Science and medicine ==
Name	Class	Major	Notability	References
Richard M. Krause	1947	Biology	Director of the National Institute of Allergy and Infectious Diseases, physician, microbiologist, and immunologist	
F. Story Musgrave	1960	Chemistry	NASA astronaut and shuttle pilot	

== Sports ==
Name	Class	Major	Notability	References
Dale E. Chadwick			College football coach and collegiate athletic director	
W. D. Chadwick			Coach of college football, baseball, and basketball and athletics administrator	
Dane Dastillung			Professional football player	
Matt DeSalvo	2002	Environmental Science	Professional baseball player with the New York Yankees	
Mel Doherty			Professional football player-coach	
Turner Hill			Professional baseball player	
Ban Johnson	1887		Founder of baseball's American League	
Terry Mulholland	1985		Professional baseball player	
Don Schaly	1959		ABCA Hall of Fame member, all-time winningest baseball coach in Division III	
John Strotbeck	1979		U.S. Olympic rower	
Kent Tekulve	1969		Professional baseball player with the Pittsburgh Pirates	
Jim Tracy	1978		Former Major League Baseball manager with the Colorado Rockies, Pittsburgh Pirates, and Los Angeles Dodgers	
Bob Walsh	1962	Journalism	Sports executive, television producer, and marketing executive	

== Other ==
Name	Class	Major	Notability	References
Andrea Parhamovich	2000		National Democratic Institute employee killed in Baghdad, Iraq on January 17, 2007	
Walter E. Webbe			Sovereign Grand Commander of the Scottish Rite of Freemasonry for the Northern Jurisdiction of the United States	
