= South Salem, Ohio =

- Village
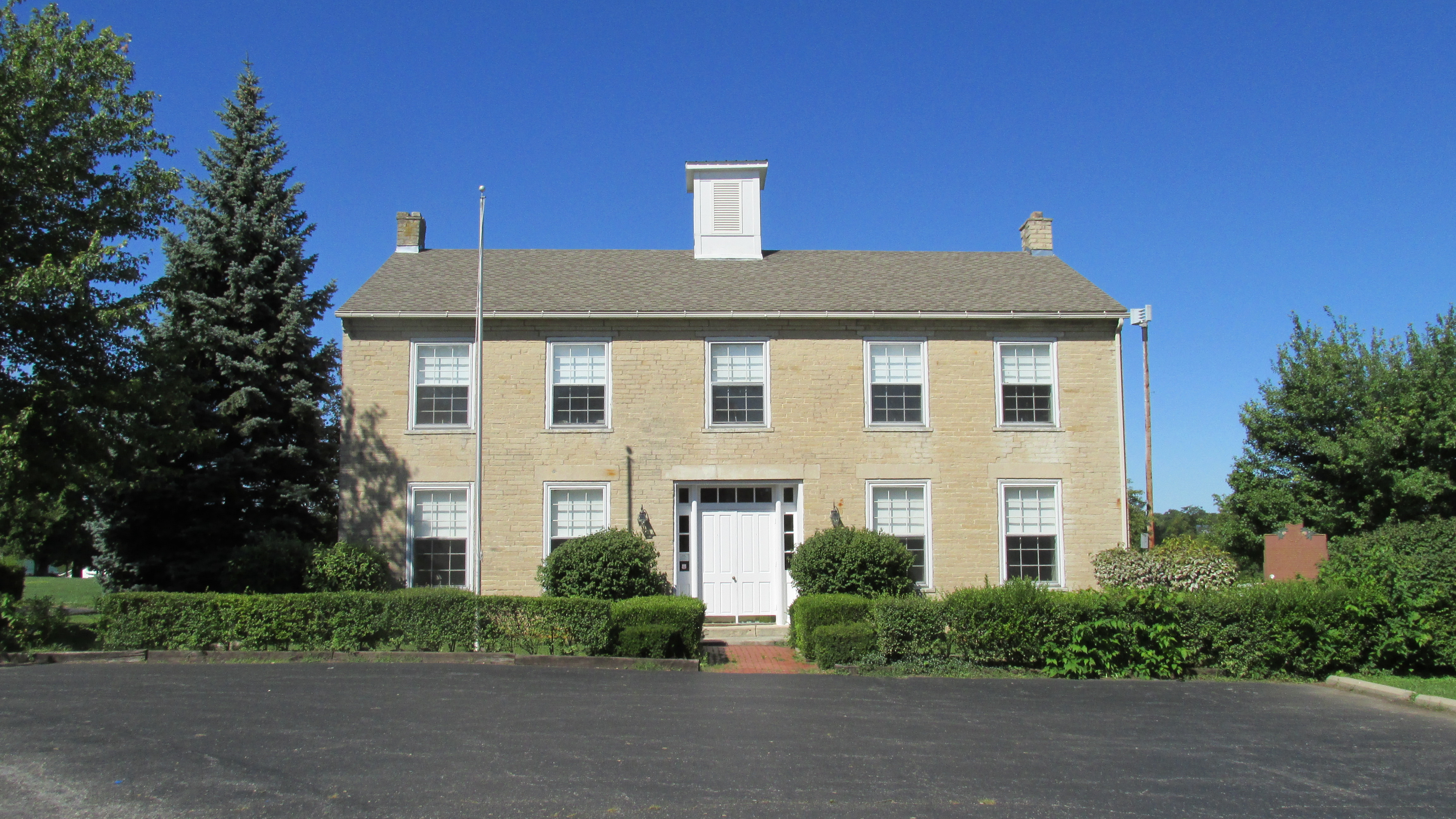
- The South Salem Academy

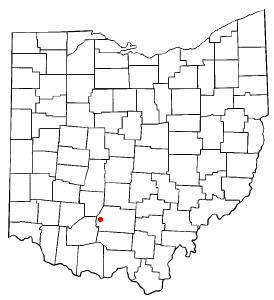
- Location of South Salem, Ohio

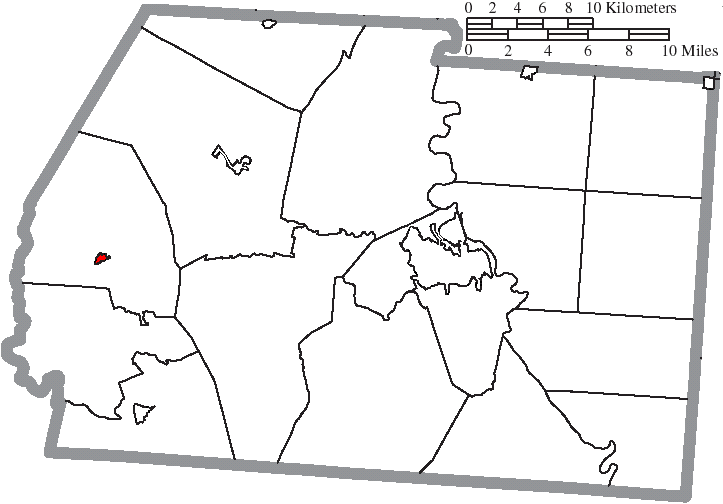
- Location of South Salem in Ross County
- Coordinates: 39°20′14″N 83°18′26″W
- Country: United States
- State: Ohio
- County: Ross

Government
  - Mayor: Michael Stroud

Area
  - Total: 0.18 sq mi (0.47 km^{2})
  - Land: 0.18 sq mi (0.47 km^{2})
  - Water: 0 sq mi (0.00 km^{2})
- Elevation: 925 ft (282 m)

Population (2020)
  - Total: 219
  - Density: 1,217.1/sq mi (469.94/km^{2})
- Time zone: UTC-5 (Eastern (EST))
  - Summer (DST): UTC-4 (EDT)
- ZIP code: 45681
- Area code: 740
- FIPS code: 39-73698
- GNIS feature ID: 2399858

South Salem is a village in Ross County, Ohio, United States. The population was 219 at the 2020 census.

== History ==
In 1842, local Presbyterian minister Hugh Stewart Fullerton orchestrated the establishment of a school in southwestern Ross County. Known as the "Salem Academy," this school became the foundation of the present village: landowner John Sample platted South Salem in 1846 in order better to serve the students and teachers of the school. After two years of rapid growth, the village reached the point that it could easily serve the needs of the school, and growth ceased. Although South Salem incorporated in the 1870s, few other changes occurred during the late years of the nineteenth century. In 1917, its population was deemed to be between 350 and 400 residents, a size that had remained consistent since the 1850s. The Salem Academy (by then known as the "South Salem Academy") closed in 1907 due to competition from other schools, and since that time, the village has declined in population.

== Geography ==
According to the United States Census Bureau, the village has a total area of 0.21 square miles (0.54 km^{2}), all land.

== Demographics ==
Historical population
Census	Pop.	Note	%±
1850	479		—
1860	318		−33.6%
1880	299		—
1890	263		−12.0%
1900	264		0.4%
1910	211		−20.1%
1920	193		−8.5%
1930	201		4.1%
1940	185		−8.0%
1950	206		11.4%
1960	180		−12.6%
1970	209		16.1%
1980	252		20.6%
1990	227		−9.9%
2000	213		−6.2%
2010	204		−4.2%
2020	219		7.4%
U.S. Decennial Census

=== 2010 census ===
As of the census of 2010, there were 204 people, 80 households, and 58 families residing in the village. The population density was 971.4 inhabitants per square mile (375.1/km^{2}). There were 84 housing units at an average density of 400.0 per square mile (154.4/km^{2}). The racial makeup of the village was 98.5% White, 1.0% African American, and 0.5% from two or more races.

There were 80 households, of which 35.0% had children under the age of 18 living with them, 55.0% were married couples living together, 13.8% had a female householder with no husband present, 3.8% had a male householder with no wife present, and 27.5% were non-families. 21.3% of all households were made up of individuals, and 7.6% had someone living alone who was 65 years of age or older. The average household size was 2.55 and the average family size was 2.90.

The median age in the village was 42 years. 23% of residents were under the age of 18; 5.8% were between the ages of 18 and 24; 27.5% were from 25 to 44; 31.3% were from 45 to 64; and 12.3% were 65 years of age or older. The gender makeup of the village was 49.0% male and 51.0% female.

=== 2000 census ===
As of the census of 2000, there were 213 people, 77 households, and 60 families residing in the village. The population density was 1,027.8 inhabitants per square mile (396.8/km^{2}). There were 81 housing units at an average density of 390.8 per square mile (150.9/km^{2}). The racial makeup of the village was 96.24% White, 0.94% African American, 0.47% Native American, 0.94% from other races, and 1.41% from two or more races. Hispanic or Latino of any race were 1.41% of the population.

There were 77 households, out of which 37.7% had children under the age of 18 living with them, 64.9% were married couples living together, 10.4% had a female householder with no husband present, and 20.8% were non-families. 16.9% of all households were made up of individuals, and 10.4% had someone living alone who was 65 years of age or older. The average household size was 2.77 and the average family size was 3.11.

In the village, the population was spread out, with 25.4% under the age of 18, 8.0% from 18 to 24, 33.8% from 25 to 44, 20.7% from 45 to 64, and 12.2% who were 65 years of age or older. The median age was 35 years. For every 100 females there were 113.0 males. For every 100 females age 18 and over, there were 93.9 males.

The median income for a household in the village was $32,500, and the median income for a family was $37,250. Males had a median income of $31,563 versus $22,500 for females. The per capita income for the village was $12,762. About 6.3% of families and 14.0% of the population were below the poverty line, including 17.7% of those under the age of eighteen and 17.4% of those 65 or over.
