= John Poage Williamson =

American missionary, politician, and writer

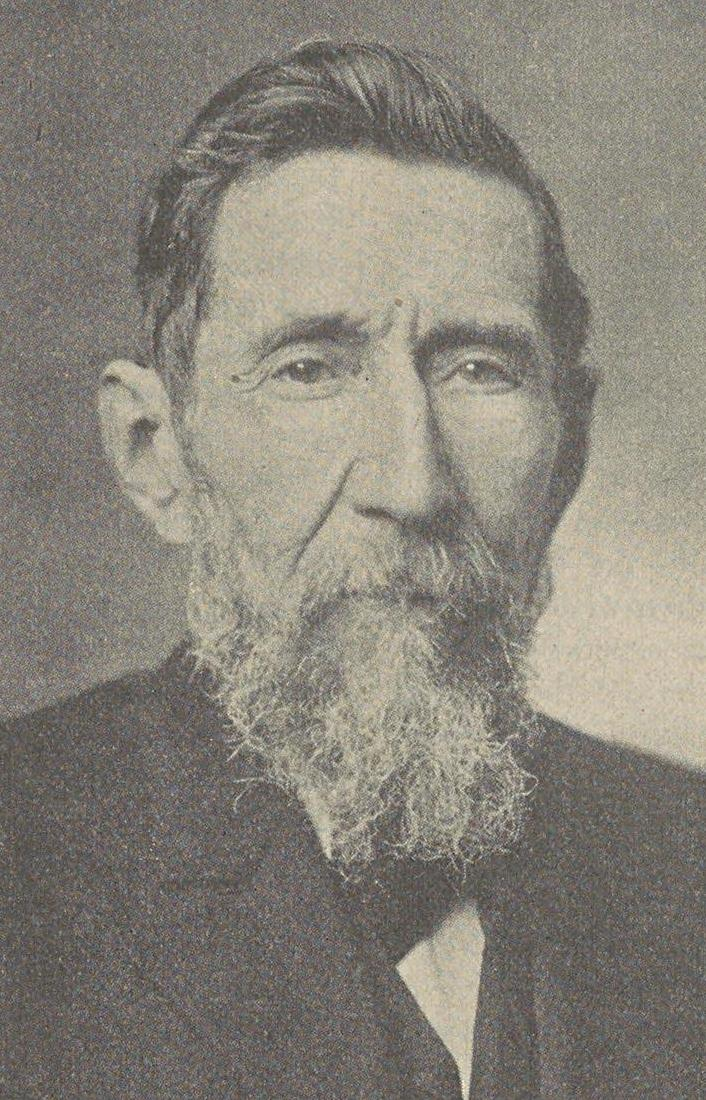
- Born: October 27, 1835; Lac qui Parle Township
- Died: October 3, 1917 (aged 81); Greenwood
- Alma mater: Lane Seminary; Knox College; Marietta College; South Salem Academy
- Political party: Republican Party
- Position held: member of the South Dakota House of Representatives (1897–1898)

John Poage Williamson (October 27, 1835 – October 3, 1917) was an American missionary, politician, and writer.

== Early life and education ==
John Poage Williamson was born on October 27, 1835, in Lac qui Parle, Minnesota, to Margaret (Poage) (died 1872) and Thomas S. Williamson (died 1879), a doctor and clergyman.

Williamson spent the first 12 years of his life on the frontier in Minnesota. In 1847 he was sent east, and he studied two years in South Salem Academy; one year at Harmar Academy, in Marietta, Ohio; one year at Mount Palatine Academy, in LaSalle, Illinois; two years in Knox College, under the abolitionist Jonathan Blanchard; and two years at Marietta College, where he graduated in 1857. He then entered Lane Theological Seminary, where he graduated in 1860.

== Missions ==
In 1835, John's father Thomas was commissioned by the American Board of Commissioners for Foreign Missions to conduct a mission among the Sioux. After numerous Sioux were taken prisoner by the United States during the Dakota War of 1862, Thomas and John preached to the prisoners of war at Mankato, Minnesota, and Fort Snelling. Thomas died in 1879.

Williamson was licensed to preach by the Presbyterian Church of Minnesota in 1859, and in the year following his graduation he worked as a pastor at Allensville and Zoar, Indiana. He started as a missionary in fall 1860 at Lower Sioux Agency and remained as a missionary thereafter. He arrived at Crow Creek Indian Reservation on May 31, 1863, which at that time was governed by Clark W. Thompson as superintendent and had a population of 1,300 Indigenous people.

The Indigenous population on the Crow Creek reservation was expelled in 1866. Williamson went with them to Niobrara, Nebraska. He remained in Niobrara until March 1869, when he became a missionary to the Yankton Sioux Tribe at Yankton Agency in South Dakota. He remained in South Dakota until his death. He reportedly oversaw the construction of 39 churches in South Dakota, which were organized into the Dakota Indian Presbytery.

== Politics ==
Williamson was a Republican. He was appointed United States special agent for the Flandreau Indian Reservation in 1873 and remained in office for five years. In 1896, he was elected to the South Dakota House of Representatives and served one term.

== Publications ==
Williamson, who had learned Dakota as a child, published several books and articles in Dakota and English, including an English-Dakota dictionary and a monthly newspaper in Dakota titled lapi Oaye. His publications include:

- Williamson, John Poage (1865). Oowa Wowapi: Dakota Iapi En. New York: American Board of Commissioners for Foreign Missions; American Tract Society.
- Williamson, John Poage (1886). An English-Dakota School Dictionary: Wa'sicun Qu Dakota Ieska Wowapi. Yankton Agency: Iapi Oaye Press.
- Williamson, John Poage; Riggs, Alfred Longley (1899). Dakota Odowan: Dakota Hymns. New York: American Tract Society.

== Personal life ==
Williamson married Sarah A. Vannice (born 1843) on April 27, 1866. They had seven children. Williamson died in Greenwood, Charles Mix County, South Dakota, on October 3, 1917, from pneumonia.

== Sources ==
- Dixon, John (1918). "John P. Williamson". The American Indian and Missions. New York: Presbyterian Board of Home Missions: 2–4.
- Robinson, Doane (1904). "Rev. John Poage Williamson". History of South Dakota. B.F. Bowen. pp. 1702–1704. OCLC 1046591291.
