= Charles Barber (author) =

American author (born 1962)

Charles Matthew Barber
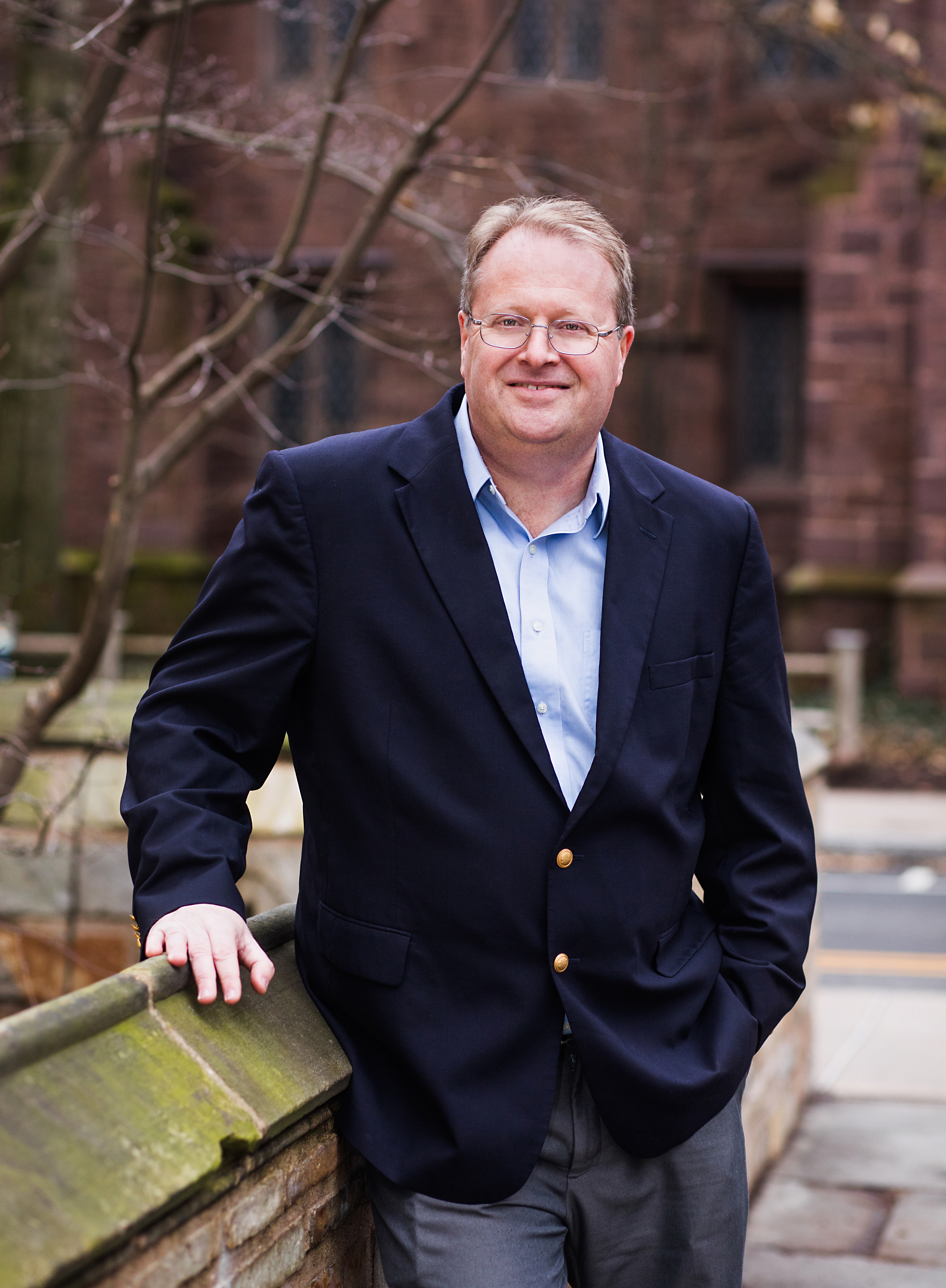
- Born: 1962 (age 63–64)
- Citizenship: American
- Education: Harvard University, Columbia University
- Spouse: Laura Radin
- Relatives: William Barber, economist
- Writing career
- Subjects: Mental health, psychiatry, criminal justice
- Notable works: Comfortably Numb, Songs from the Black Chair
- Website: www.charlesbarberwriting.com

Charles Barber (born 1962) is an American author and Writer in Residence at Wesleyan University who writes narrative nonfiction books about medicine, psychiatry, and criminal justice.

== Early life, education and influences ==
Barber grew up in Middletown, Connecticut, the son of economist William Barber. He attended Harvard University, where he studied with and was greatly influenced by the psychiatrist and writer Robert Coles. After attending graduate school at Columbia University, Barber worked for ten years with the homeless mentally ill in New York City. He worked in shelters at Bellevue and NewYork-Presbyterian Hospital, and in supportive housing programs. Later, he worked in the criminal justice system in Connecticut, in prisons and halfway houses. Before becoming an author, he co-published scholarly works in criminal justice and psychiatry.

== Writing ==
In 2005, Barber published Songs from the Black Chair: A Memoir of Mental Interiors, an account of his work with the homeless and also the story of his own experiences with obsessive–compulsive disorder (OCD). The New England Journal of Medicine compared the book to William Styron’s Darkness Visible and Sylvia Nasar’s A Beautiful Mind.

In 2008, Barber published Comfortably Numb: How Psychiatry is Medicating a Nation, a critique of the over-use of psychiatric medications, particularly antidepressants, to treat and medicate everyday life problems. Comfortably Numb was a Barnes and Noble Discover Great New Writers selection, and was called "a blockbuster" by Library Journal.

Barber published Citizen Outlaw: One Man's Journey from Gang Leader to Peacekeeper about reformed New Haven gangster William Outlaw in late 2019. Barber and Outlaw appeared on The Today Show and on C-SPAN's Book TV.

In 2022, Barber published Peace & Health: How a group of small-town activists and college students set out to change healthcare, about the fifty-year history of the Community Health Center and the center's CEO Mark Masselli. Barber has spoken nationally about the book, appearing with Masselli and Colorado Senator John Hickenlooper.

In May 2023, Grand Central Publishing released Barber's In the Blood: How Two Outsiders Solved a Centuries Old Medical Mystery and took on the U.S. Army. The Wall Street Journal described In the Blood as "the captivating, often cinematic story of how a medical innovation was improbably developed, fiercely resisted, and ultimately adopted". It tells the story of how inventor Frank Hursey and his business partner Bart Gullong developed the blood-clotting properties of zeolite into a hemostatic dressing called QuikClot. The book was a finalist for the 2024 PEN America/E.O. Wilson Literary Science Writing Award and was named an Amazon Editor's Pick for Best Books of 2023 So Far.

== Lectures, affiliations, and awards ==
Barber has lectured nationally and internationally at colleges, medical schools, and mental health advocacy organizations. He is a Writer in Residence at Wesleyan University and a Lecturer in Psychiatry at the Yale School of Medicine. At Yale, he is editor of The Perch, an award winning arts journal with a mental health theme. In 2025, he was named a Literary Arts Fellow of the Montalvo Arts Center's Sally and Don Lucas Artists Program in Saratoga, California, receiving a three-month residency to develop new work.

== Published works ==
- In the Blood: How Two Outsiders Solved a Centuries-Old Medical Mystery and Took on the U. S. Army (Grand Central Publishing, 2023) ISBN 978-1-538-70986-3
- Peace & Health: How a group of small-town activists and college students set out to change healthcare (Octoberworks, 2022) ISBN 978-1-959-26202-2
- Citizen Outlaw: One Man's Journey from Gang Leader to Peacekeeper (HarperCollins, 2019) ISBN 978-0-062-69284-9
- Comfortably Numb: How Psychiatry Is Medicating a Nation (Softcover) (Vintage, 2009) ISBN 978-0-307-27495-3
- Comfortably Numb: How Psychiatry Is Medicating a Nation (Hardcover) (Pantheon, 2008) ISBN 978-0-375-42399-4
- Songs from the Black Chair (Softcover) (Bison Books, 2007) ISBN 978-0-8032-5975-1
- Songs from the Black Chair (Hardcover) (Nebraska Press, 2005) ISBN 978-0-8032-1298-5
