= Anita DeFrantz =

American rower

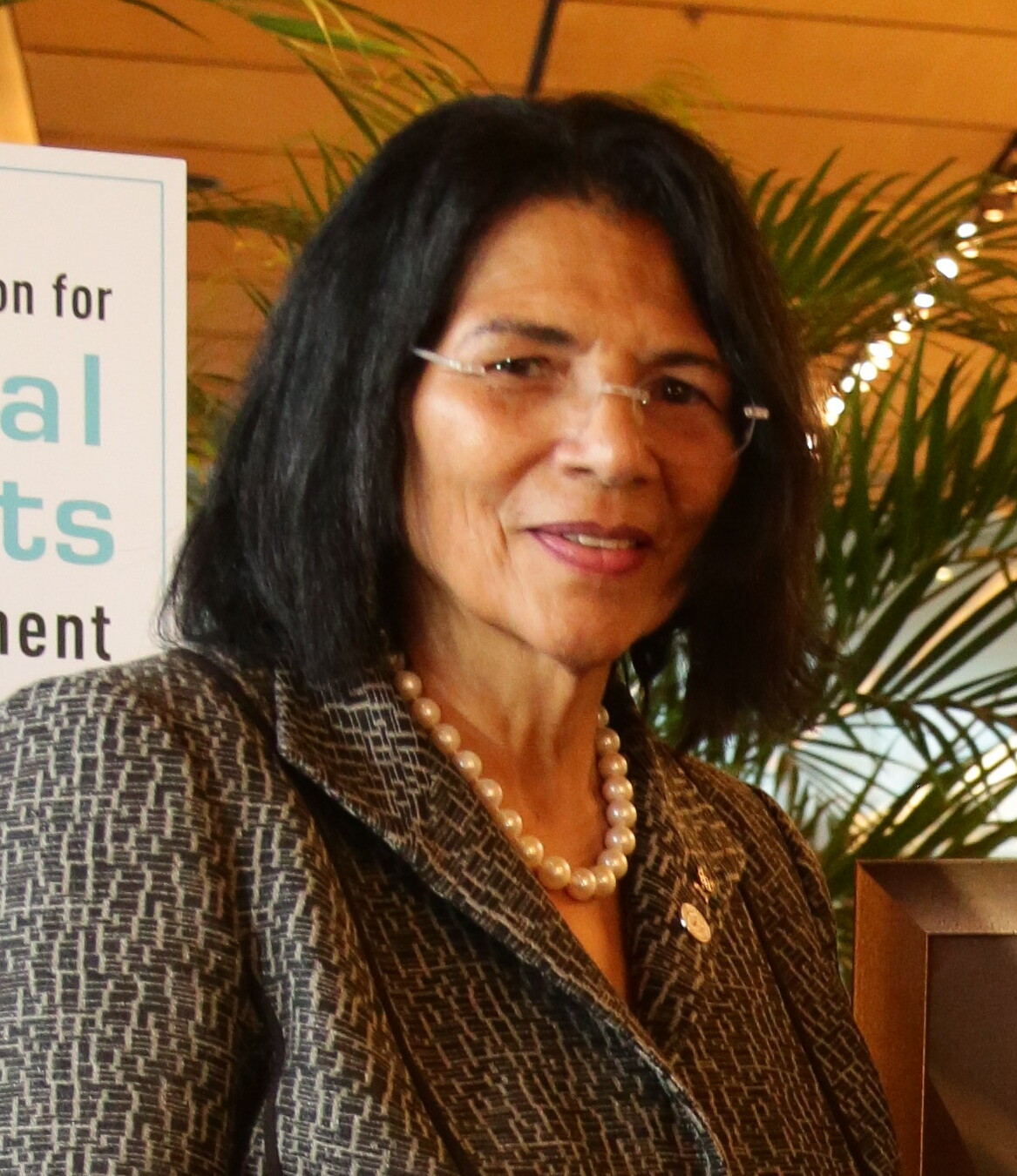
- DeFrantz in 2016

Personal information
- National team: United States
- Born: October 4, 1952 (age 74) Philadelphia, Pennsylvania, U.S.
- Education: Connecticut College (BA); University of Pennsylvania (JD)
Medal record
Rowing
Representing the United States
Olympic Games
Bronze medal – third place	1976 Montreal	Women's eight

Anita Lucette DeFrantz (born October 4, 1952) is an American Olympic rower, member of the International Olympic Committee, and twice vice-president of International Rowing Federation (FISA).

== Early life ==
DeFrantz was born on October 4, 1952, in Philadelphia, Pennsylvania. She encountered rowing during her sophomore year at Connecticut College, when crew coach Bart Gullong encouraged her to try out. She earned her degree in political philosophy. DeFrantz continued on to law school at the University of Pennsylvania after graduating in 1974, where she was able to focus on rowing and compete with the Vesper Boat Club.

== Olympics ==
DeFrantz was captain of the American rowing team at the 1976 Summer Olympics, winning the bronze medal in women's eight. In 1980, the United States boycotted the 1980 Olympic Games in Moscow, Russian SFSR, USSR: DeFrantz qualified as part of the 1980 U.S. Olympic team, but she was unable to compete. She was one of 461 athletes to receive a Congressional Gold Medal.

== Board member ==
In 1986, the International Olympic Committee (IOC) appointed DeFrantz to membership in the organization. She became the first chair of the prototype of the IOC Women in Sport Commission in 1992, and the first female vice-president of the IOC executive committee in 1997, serving until 2001. On June 25, 2012, DeFrantz told AroundTheRings.com that she would like to return to the IOC Executive Committee. She was elected back onto the IOC Executive Board on September 10, 2013, and she was elected to a four-year term as IOC Vice President at the 131st IOC Session in Lima, Peru on September 15, 2017.

DeFrantz is also on the board of the Al Oerter Foundation (AOF) which runs the Art of the Olympians (AOTO) program which is an international organization of Olympian and Paralympian artists promoting the Olympic values and ideals through educational and cultural programs and exhibitions.

== Honors ==
In 1980, DeFrantz was awarded the Olympic Order for her contributions to the Olympic Movement. In 2017, a plaque honoring her was unveiled in the L.A. Memorial Coliseum's Court of Honor.
