= Bart Gullong =

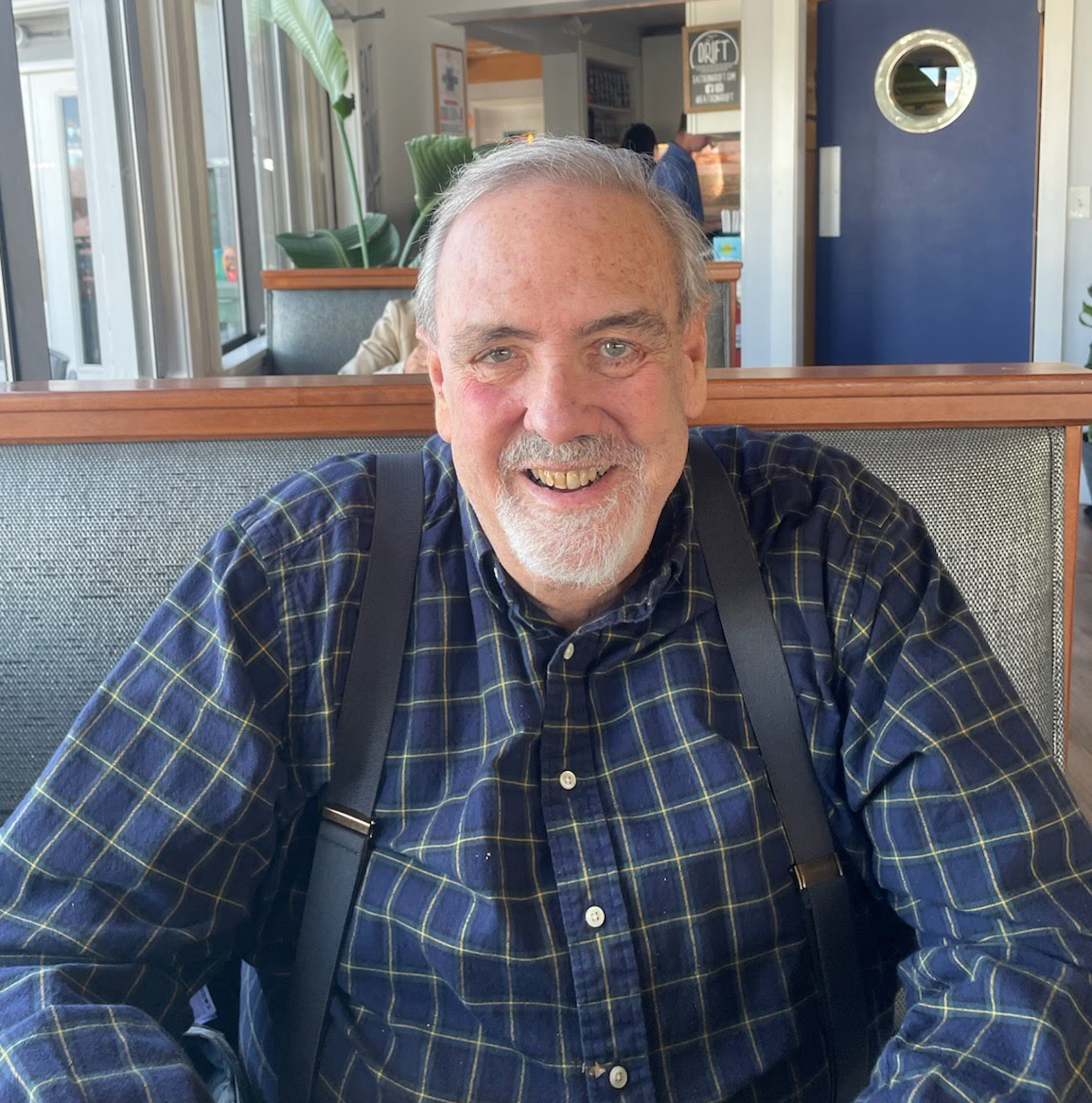
- Born: 1948 (age 77–78)
- Occupation: Entrepreneur
- Known for: Co-developing and marketing QuikClot
- Children: 1 (Sarah)

Charles Barton Gullong (born 1948) is an American businessman best known for developing and marketing QuikClot, a hemostatic dressing designed to rapidly control bleeding, with its inventor Frank Hursey. Gullong was instrumental in bringing QuikClot to the entire United States Armed Forces and overcoming initial resistance from the US Army Institute of Surgical Research. QuikClot is the hemostatic agent of choice recommended by the Committee on Tactical Combat Casualty Care and it has saved thousands of lives.

== Early life ==
Gullong grew up in central Connecticut and attended Tabor Academy and Marietta College. He was an accomplished rower and went on to become the head crew coach at Connecticut College. Gullong served as a Title IX advocate, recruited the future Olympian oarswoman Anita DeFrantz on campus, and gained national renown as a coach.

== Entrepreneur ==
In 1999, Gullong met inventor Frank Hursey, who was developing a blood clotting agent based on the mineral zeolite. After the September 11th attacks, Gullong brought the zeolite product, now called QuikClot, to the attention of the U.S. Navy and Marines. QuikClot performed better in blood-clotting tests than all other hemostatic products being tested. The Navy and Marines adopted QuikClot, and it was deployed in Iraq and Afghanistan in 2002.

== Controversy with U.S. Army ==
QuikClot was adopted by all service branches except the Army, which favored two competing products. Both failed, and one, recombinant factor VII, may have exposed soldiers to life-threatening risks. Army medical personnel criticized Gullong, claiming that QuikClot burned surrounding tissue when applied to a wound. The burn risk affected only 3% of treatments in a field study, with the benefits vastly outweighing the costs, and soldiers and families made informal arrangements to obtain QuikClot. Gullong worked with mineral scientist Galen D. Stucky and the Office of Naval Research to develop an improved product employing kaolin, which causes no burns. In 2008, this revised product, QuikClot Combat Gauze, was adopted by the entire U.S. military as its hemostatic agent of choice, and remains so to this day.

== Subsequent history and popular culture ==
In 2019, Taylor Swift stated, "I carry QuikClot army grade bandage dressing, which is for gunshot or stab wounds", citing her fear of an attack at one of her concerts. In 2020, QuikClot was sold to Teleflex for more than $500 million. Charles Barber's 2023 book In the Blood: How Two Outsiders Solved a Centuries-Old Medical Mystery and Took on the U.S. Army positioned Gullong as the chief protagonist, and was a finalist for the 2024 PEN America/E.O. Wilson Literary Science Writing Award. Gullong was the commencement speaker and received an honorary doctorate degree from Marietta College in 2025.
