= Frank Hursey =

Francis Xavier Hursey
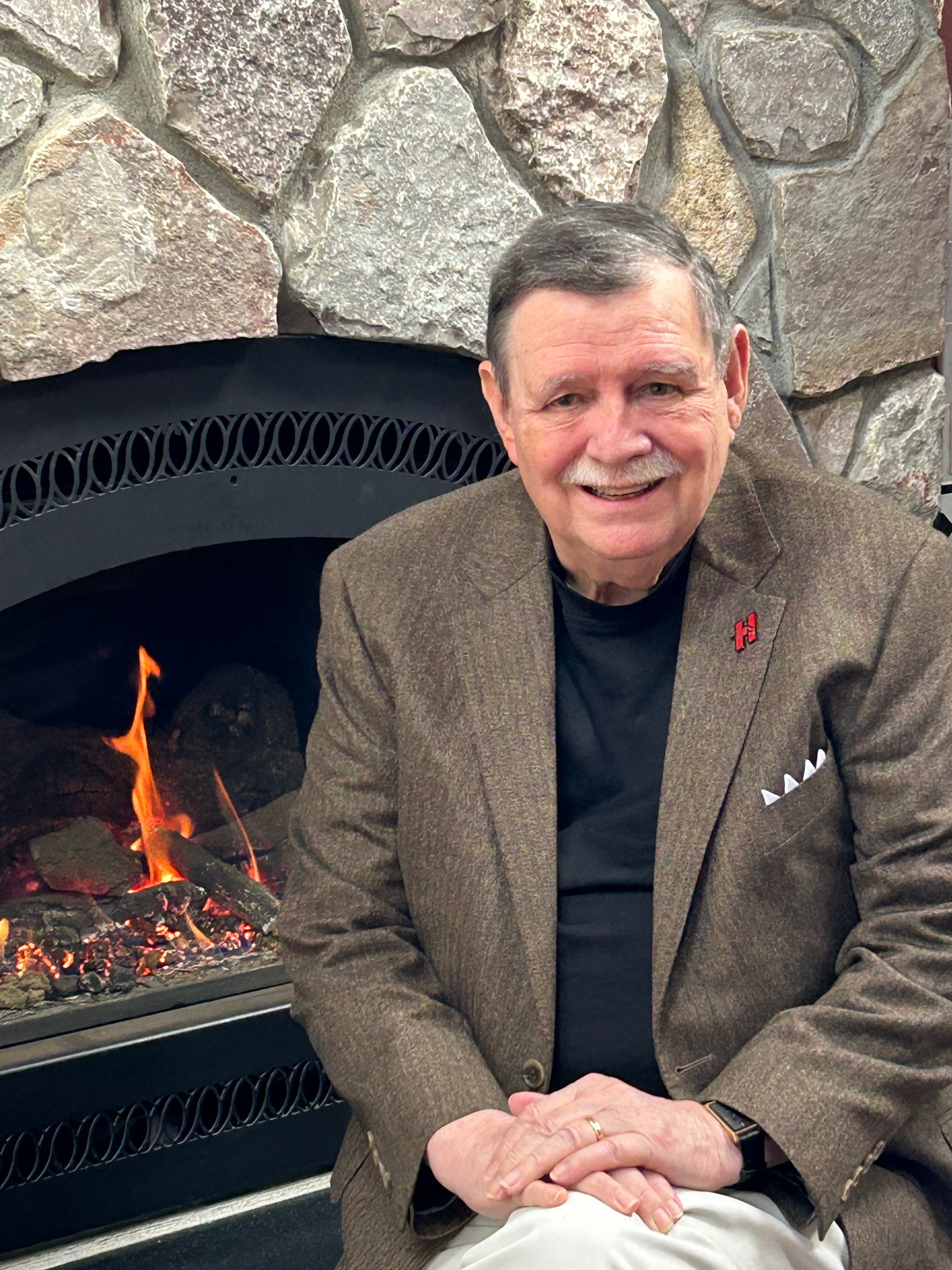
- Born: 1944 (age 81–82)
- Known for: Inventing QuikClot
- Spouse: Nancy O'Neil
- Children: 3

Frank Hursey (born 1944) is an American inventor and philanthropist, best known for inventing QuikClot, a hemostatic dressing designed to rapidly control bleeding. QuikClot Combat Gauze, impregnated with kaolin, is the hemostatic agent of choice recommended by the Committee on Tactical Combat Casualty Care for the United States Armed Forces. It is widely used by hospital operating & emergency rooms, the military, EMS crews, law enforcement, and consumers. It has saved thousands of lives.

== Early life ==
Hursey grew up in Dillon, South Carolina and moved to Connecticut at age 19. He began working at Pratt & Whitney on fuel cells for NASA's Apollo program. He earned a bachelor's degree in mechanical engineering from the University of Hartford after twelve years of night classes, followed by a master's degree in management from Rensselaer Polytechnic Institute.

== Invention of QuikClot ==
Hursey worked as a hospital engineer specializing in respiratory machines, where he encountered zeolite, a mineral used to enrich oxygen by adsorbing nitrogen. In 1987, he founded On-Site Gas Systems, a company producing oxygen and nitrogen generators.

In the mid-1980s, Hursey hypothesized that zeolite could be used to treat wounds by adsorbing water from blood while leaving clotting agents intact. He filed a patent in 1989 but struggled to market the product.

In 1999, Hursey partnered with entrepreneur Bart Gullong. Gullong and Hursey created a company called Z-Medica in 2002 to produce QuikClot. After the September 11 attacks, Gullong introduced QuikClot to the U.S. Navy and Marines, where it outperformed other hemostatic agents and was deployed in Iraq and Afghanistan in 2002.

The U.S. Army initially rejected QuikClot in favor of competing products. Hursey collaborated with mineral scientist Galen Stucky and the Office of Naval Research to develop an improved product using kaolin, which eliminated the exothermic burn reaction side effect with zeolite. In 2008, QuikClot was adopted across the U.S. military.

Hursey holds 39 patents related to QuikClot.

In 2020, Z-Medica was sold to Teleflex for over $500 million.

The story of Hursey and Gullong's invention was chronicled in Charles Barber's 2023 book, In the Blood: How Two Outsiders Solved a Centuries-Old Medical Mystery and Took on the U.S. Army.

== Philanthropy and personal life ==
The Francis X. and Nancy Hursey Center for Advanced Engineering and Health Professions opened in 2021. In 2023, Hursey received an honorary doctorate from the University of Hartford.

He married Nancy O'Neil, a nurse, in 1967. They have three children and reside in West Hartford, Connecticut and Cape Cod. He is the primary investor in three hotels and two restaurants on Cape Cod. He also funds the Hursey Center hotel and youth camp in Uganda.
