= QuikClot =

Brand of hemostatic wound dressings owned by Teleflex

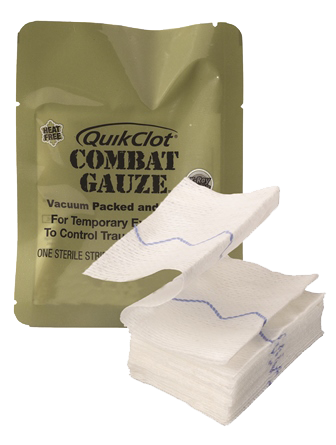
QuikClot Combat Gauze

QuikClot is a brand of wound dressings that contain kaolin, a hemostatic agent. The brand is owned by Teleflex. It is primarily used by militaries, surgeons, EMS, and first responding civilians to stop traumatic hemorrhage.

== History ==
The use of a sterilized molecular sieve material, such as zeolite, in a binding material to treat wounds was patented by Frank Hursey in 1989. Hursey's business partner Bart Gullong brought the invention to the U.S. Navy and Marines in early 2002 as part of an Office of Naval Research study comparing different antihemorrhagic technologies. QuikClot received the best score in the study. Another study found that when used to treat lethal groin injuries in swine, the treated animals had a 100% survival rate.

QuikClot was chosen as the U.S. Department of Defense's "hemostatic dressing of choice" by the CoTCCC (Committee on Tactical Combat Casualty Care) in 2008. In 2014, it was listed as the ideal hemostatic dressing to be used for external hemorrhage not amenable to tourniquet use or as an adjunct to tourniquet removal if evacuation time is anticipated to be longer than 2 hours. In the TCCC Guidelines published in 2021, QuikClot remained the choice hemostatic dressing for such an injury.

The challenges faced by Gullong and Hursey in getting QuikClot accepted by the military, especially the Army, were chronicled by Charles Barber in his book In the Blood: How Two Outsiders Solved a Centuries-Old Medical Mystery and Took on the U.S. Army.

== Mechanism ==
=== Zeolite ===
QuikClot was originally available as a zeolite granulate to be poured directly on a wound to stem bleeding. The zeolite had an exothermic (heat-releasing) reaction with blood during the clotting process, which could cause second-degree burns. Because of this, the product was not available for retail and was only used in emergency scenarios, such as in combat.

=== Kaolin ===
By 2008, QuikClot devices were made of gauze impregnated with kaolin instead of using zeolite. The kaolin device performed equivalently to previously developed hemostatic bandages. Kaolin doesn't trigger skin allergies due to its inert (nonreactive) characteristics. Galen Stucky's lab provided supporting research of improved behavior.

The kaolin in QuikClot absorbs the water molecules in blood, leaving behind the relatively bigger platelets and clotting factor molecules. The higher concentration of these remaining cells and molecules cause them to naturally clot faster. Kaolin activates factor XII, a protein factor which assists in the initiation of the coagulation cascade, a protein chain reaction which promotes blood clotting as a result of trauma.
