= South Salem Academy =

- U.S. National Register of Historic Places
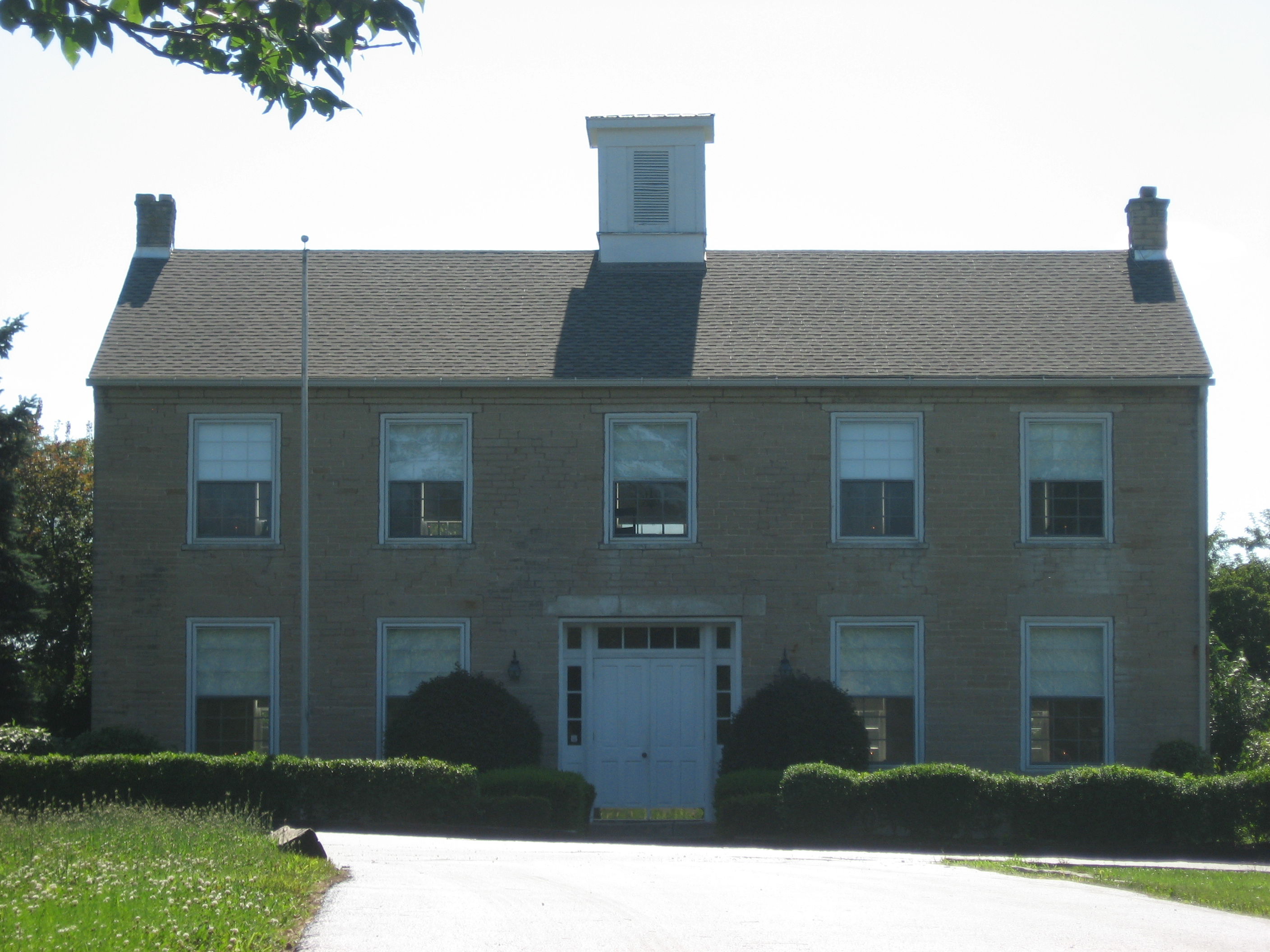
- Front of the academy

- Location within Ohio Location within the United States
- Location: Church St., South Salem, Ohio
- Coordinates: 39°20′10″N 83°18′38″W
- Area: less than one acre
- Built: 1842
- Architect: H.S. Fullerton, et al.
- Architectural style: Federal
- NRHP reference No.: 79001937
- Added to NRHP: February 23, 1979

The South Salem Academy is a historic former school in South Salem, Ohio, United States. Built in 1842, it is a stone building constructed in the Federal style of architecture.

Throughout nineteenth-century Ohio, churches played a major part in founding educational institutions. Because no upper-level schools were present in southwestern Ross County in 1842, a local Presbyterian minister, Hugh Stewart Fullerton, called a meeting to remedy the situation. Both the members of his congregation and the remaining local residents responded heartily to his proposal; by the end of the year, the present structure had been constructed. It is a two-story rectangular building of cut limestone, five bays wide on the front and ornamented with a cupola in the middle of the roof. The Salem Academy's first classes began meeting in 1842, following the classical model of education. Students were able to enroll in preparatory and normal departments; included in the curriculum were courses on mathematics, various sciences, and English, all of which were taught from a Christian perspective. As the years passed, the village of South Salem grew up around the school, having been platted in 1846 primarily to serve the needs of the school's students and teachers. After the academy came under the supervision of the Chillicothe Presbytery of the Presbyterian Church in 1859, students pursued a two-year course of instruction and, upon graduation, departed for other schools. During the second half of the nineteenth century, the school declined. Many students left to fight in the Civil War in the 1860s, and rising numbers of high schools elsewhere in the area reduced the demand for a school in South Salem. After the academy's doors closed in 1922, the building was sold to the Buckskin Township Board of Education. Among its 1,500 alumni was Joseph B. Foraker, a future Governor of Ohio.

The academy was expanded in 1903. When its original four rooms — two per floor — became too small for the school, two concrete block wings were added to the building. Despite this modification, it was designated a historic site in 1979, being added to the National Register of Historic Places. It qualified for inclusion on the Register both because of its well-preserved historic architecture and because of its leading place in local history.
