= Mark Masselli =

American public health leader

- Born: 1951 (age 74–75); Middletown, Connecticut
- Occupation: American public health leader
- Spouse: Jennifer Alexander
- Children: 4
- Parents: Nicholas William Masselli; Ida Marie (Rusconi) Masselli

Mark Masselli (born 1951) is an American public health leader and community organizer. In 1972, Masselli co-founded Community Health Center (CHC), the largest Federally Qualified Health Center in Connecticut. He has served as CHC's president and CEO since the organization's founding. CHC provides primary care services to more than 150,000 patients at 200 sites across Connecticut. CHC was also integral in setting up and running Connecticut's COVID-19 vaccination sites, administering more than half a million vaccines. Masselli's work conceiving and building CHC is detailed in Peace & Health: How a group of small-town activists and college students set out to change healthcare. In 2024, Masselli founded the Moses/Weitzman Health System, the nation's first health system dedicated to primary care for underserved populations. The system was named for Masselli's early mentors and long-time CHC board members, pharmacist Gerard Weitzman, whose family escaped pogroms in Ukraine, and Reba Moses, a descendant of slaves in South Carolina who migrated North and became a leading advocate for health equity and social justice.

== Early life and education ==
Masselli was born in 1951 in Middletown, Connecticut to Nicholas William Masselli and Ida Marie (Rusconi) Masselli. He attended Xavier High School, graduating in 1969. In 2009, Masselli was awarded an honorary Doctorate of Humane Letters by Wesleyan University.

== Community Health Center, Inc. ==
In 1972, Masselli founded Community Health Center, Inc. alongside Middletown community activists and students at Wesleyan University, including John Hickenlooper. In his memoir, Senator Hickenlooper describes CHC's beginnings as a free clinic in a walk-up apartment. CHC has evolved into one of the nation's largest and most innovative federally qualified health centers, offering primary medical, dental & behavioral health care and an array of specialty services.

CHC operates with a basic core mission: healthcare is a right, not a privilege. The center makes a special commitment to providing care to the uninsured, underserved, and key populations such as those living with HIV/AIDS.

During the 1990s, supported by federal funding for FQHCs, CHC expanded to midsize cities across Connecticut, including New London, Meriden, and New Britain. The center now operates 16 large community clinics, a national training and technology development arm, and 185 school-based health centers.

In 2021, CHC set up the largest mass vaccination site in Connecticut in East Hartford. CHC set up additional mass vaccination sites in Stamford and Middletown. In 2022, CHC received funding from the American Rescue Plan to expand virtual appointment options.

== International work ==
Masselli has been active on global health issues in India and South Asia. In October 2008, he delivered an address titled Sustainability: A community approach. Being relevant to the community and forging partnerships, at the Aravind Eye Hospital, Global Consultation on Sustainability, Pondicherry, India.

He has traveled throughout India, China, Nepal and Tibet and was increasingly drawn to the works of Archbishop Desmond Tutu and the Dalai Lama, first encountering His Holiness at an event at Harvard in 1979. They later met and Mark traveled with His Holiness during his visit to France in the early 1980s, where Mark had the opportunity to discuss his community work in Middletown with the Dalai Lama personally. Later, he was invited by the Office of Tibet in New York to assist with strategy to engage the US to support Tibet, and has continued his advocacy, including serving as a host family for a Tibetan couple and their children fleeing persecution. In the 1980s, Mark worked directly with Archbishop Tutu to establish the Bishop Tutu Refugee Fund to aid refugees from apartheid in South Africa.

== Podcast ==
Masselli and cohost Margaret Flinter launched Conversations on Health Care on Wesleyan University's radio station WESU in 2009. The first guest was Speaker of the United States House of Representatives Nancy Pelosi. Over the years, the show has been distributed nationally on NPR, as a podcast, a video series, and through major news outlets in New York City and Washington, DC. Guests have included leaders in health care and politics such as Anthony Fauci, Mark Cuban, and Francis Collins. Since 2023, Conversations on Health Care has been invited to record at the Aspen Institute conference, Aspen Ideas: Health. Guests recorded in Aspen include Renee Fleming, Dr. John Torres and Stephanie Carlton of the Centers for Medicare and Medicaid Services.

== Professional life ==
Masselli's vision of health care expands beyond medical offices. In her book on community renewal, singer-songwriter Dar Williams describes the work Masselli and his wife have done to strengthen the community fabric of Middletown. In 2000, Masselli, together with his wife, established Vinnie's Jump and Jive, a community dance hall, to encourage families to participate in healthy community activities together. Masselli received the key to the city of Middletown in 2022. Masselli was named one of the Health Power 25 by the Hartford Business Journal in 2020.

Masselli has been a leader in Economic Development. He chaired the committee that created the Inn at MIddletown in Middletown, CT. At the time, he was quoted in the New York Times about putting the project back on track after the 9/11/2001 terrorist attacks.

As chairman of the Middletown Hotel Committee, Masselli was quoted in the CT Insider, listing the economic activity the Inn was expected to generate in Middletown, including guests from businesses like Aetna and Pratt & Whitney and tourist attractions such as the Goodspeed Opera House and Kidcity Children's Museum.

Masselli is chair of the board for the School-Based Health Alliance, and board chair of the National Institute for Medical Assistant Advancement. He also serves on the board of the Consortium for Advanced Practice Providers and on the Goodspeed Opera House Board of Trustees.
