= Kathy Brodsky =

American author and poet

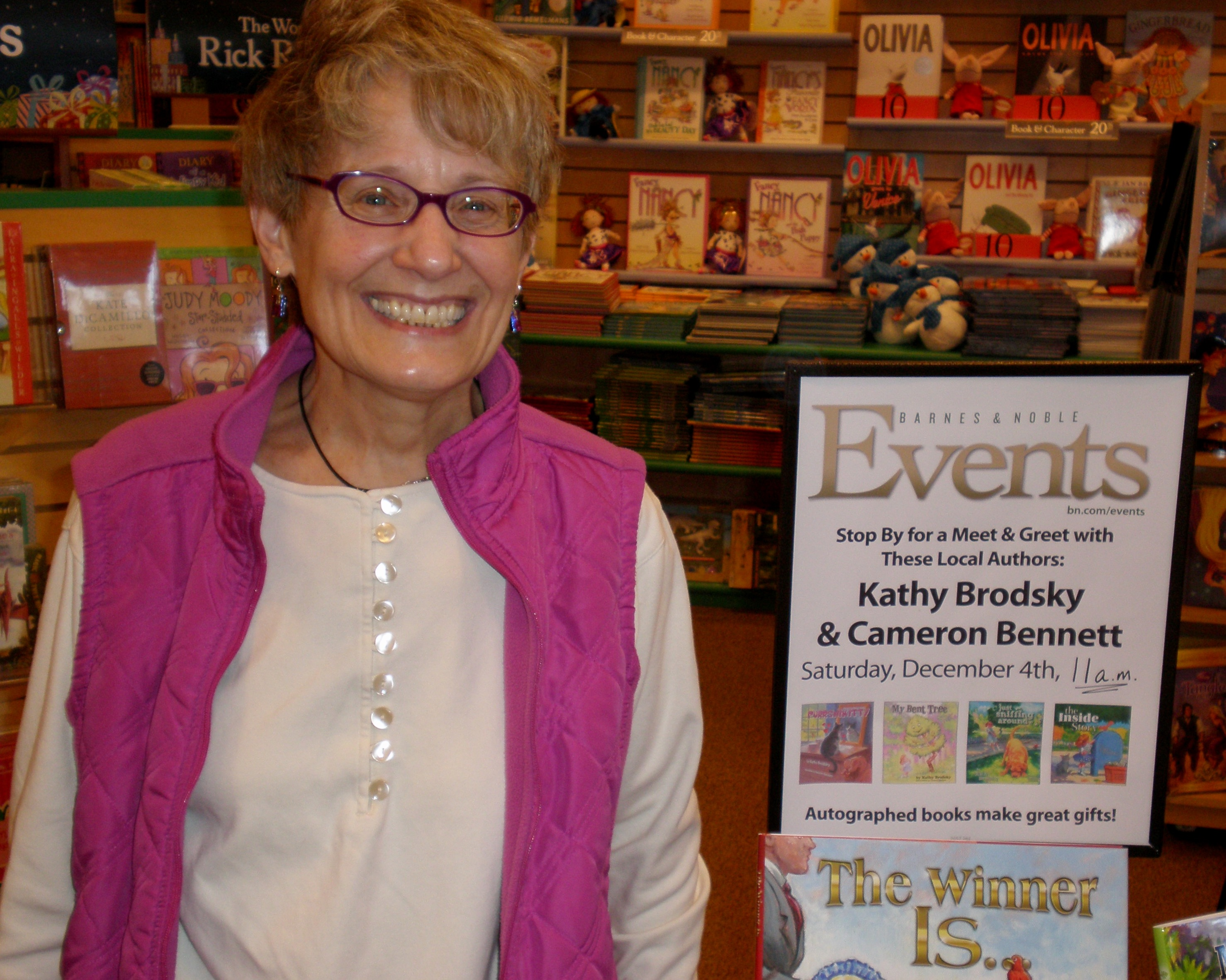
Kathy Brodsky at a Barnes & Noble author's signing in 2010.

Kathy Brodsky (born January 8, 1945) is an American author and poet. She has written seventeen books, sixteen of which are children's books, and one that is a collection of 65 poems reflecting her observations and insights about life. She was the writer-in-residence at the Pierce School in Bennington, New Hampshire, and at the Harold Martin School in Hopkinton, New Hampshire.

Brodsky is a presenter for the Children's Literacy Foundation and has spoken at writer's conferences around the United States, and she has made guest appearances at libraries and schools across New England. According to the WorldCat global catalog of library collections, Brodsky's works are held by 111 libraries worldwide.

Some of Brodsky's books have been published in a Braille edition for readers who are blind or visually impaired. One of her titles has been translated into Spanish.

Brodsky's books have won multiple awards, including two national honors from the Green Book Festival, Book of the Year from Creative Child Magazine, and a top 10 listing from the International Literacy Association and Children's Book Council's Children's Choice Reading List. Each year 12,500 school children from throughout the United States read newly published children's and young adult books and vote for their favorites. Brodsky was selected for this list in 2014.

Her books have been featured and reviewed in Publishers Weekly, The Huffington Post, Orange County Register, Edmonton Sun, The Guardian, New Hampshire Union Leader, Concord Monitor, Cape Cod Times, Monadnock Ledger-Transcript, The Portsmouth Herald, The Amherst Citizen, Foster's Daily Democrat, and The Telegraph.

Brodsky is a psychotherapist, a Licensed Clinical Social Worker specializing in individual, women's, couples, and family issues. She has been quoted for her expertise as a therapist in The Wall Street Journal, The Sunday Independent (South Africa), the New Hampshire Union Leader, and Parenting NH.

== Psychotherapy career ==
Prior to attending graduate school at Simmons College School of Social Work in Boston, Brodsky worked at Massachusetts General Hospital at a walk-in clinic connected to the psychiatry department. Later, as part of her clinical social work training in grad school, she worked at a youth guidance center in Framingham, Massachusetts, followed by a year counseling veterans at the VA Hospital in Bedford, Massachusetts.

After earning her MSW in 1970, Brodsky worked for five years as a therapist for the Greater Manchester, NH, Mental Health Center, an outpatient and acute residential treatment facility, where she was responsible for intake and therapy for adolescents and adults. Starting in 1976, Brodsky was a therapist at Child and Family Services of New Hampshire, a non-profit agency, where she counseled individuals; she later began helping couples, often prior to divorce, deal with their next phase of life.

Following her eight-year tenure at Child and Family Services, Brodsky was named the citywide school and family education liaison, helping families of children with special needs in Manchester – the largest and most diverse public school district in the state, with 14,000 students. In 1987, she opened her private counseling and therapy practice, which she continues to this day.

== Writing career ==
Brodsky began her writing career with a poetry book, Moments in our Lives: A Woman's Eye View, published in 2004. The book consists of a series of poems capturing her experiences as a woman and a therapist. According to The Laconia Daily Sun, these poems "reveal joys, strength and courage in dealing with stressful personal situations." Florence Henderson wrote of the book, "Brodsky's poems are a delight. They are full of humor, compassion, and insight into women's joy, frustration, and sadness." Brodsky also recorded Moment of our Lives for audio listening.

Brodsky's writing focuses on simple, everyday events that bring to mind larger issues in the world. Her first volume of essays, Moments in our Lives, illustrates universal life events and experiences – memories of childhood, the joys of pets, and walks in the woods.

=== Children's Stories ===
After Moments in our Lives, Brodsky turned to writing children's books. The stories are all told in rhyming verse, and the poems aim to entertain while integrating social messages about the important issues children deal with in their lives. The Laconia Daily Sun writes that Brodsky's work "features lovable characters and their lively adventures concluding with questions designed to engage readers and activities meant to enjoy individually or in a group." While each of Brodsky's stories has its own protagonist, the characters from her other books make appearances in each other's stories, allowing for recurring supporting characters in all Brodsky's books.

"And rhythm is important," Brodsky told book reviewer Ella Johnson, in a 2011 interview. "Each of my books started as a poem. What I like about poetry is that it's very succinct. Each character in my books comes from either something someone has said to me or something I've seen."

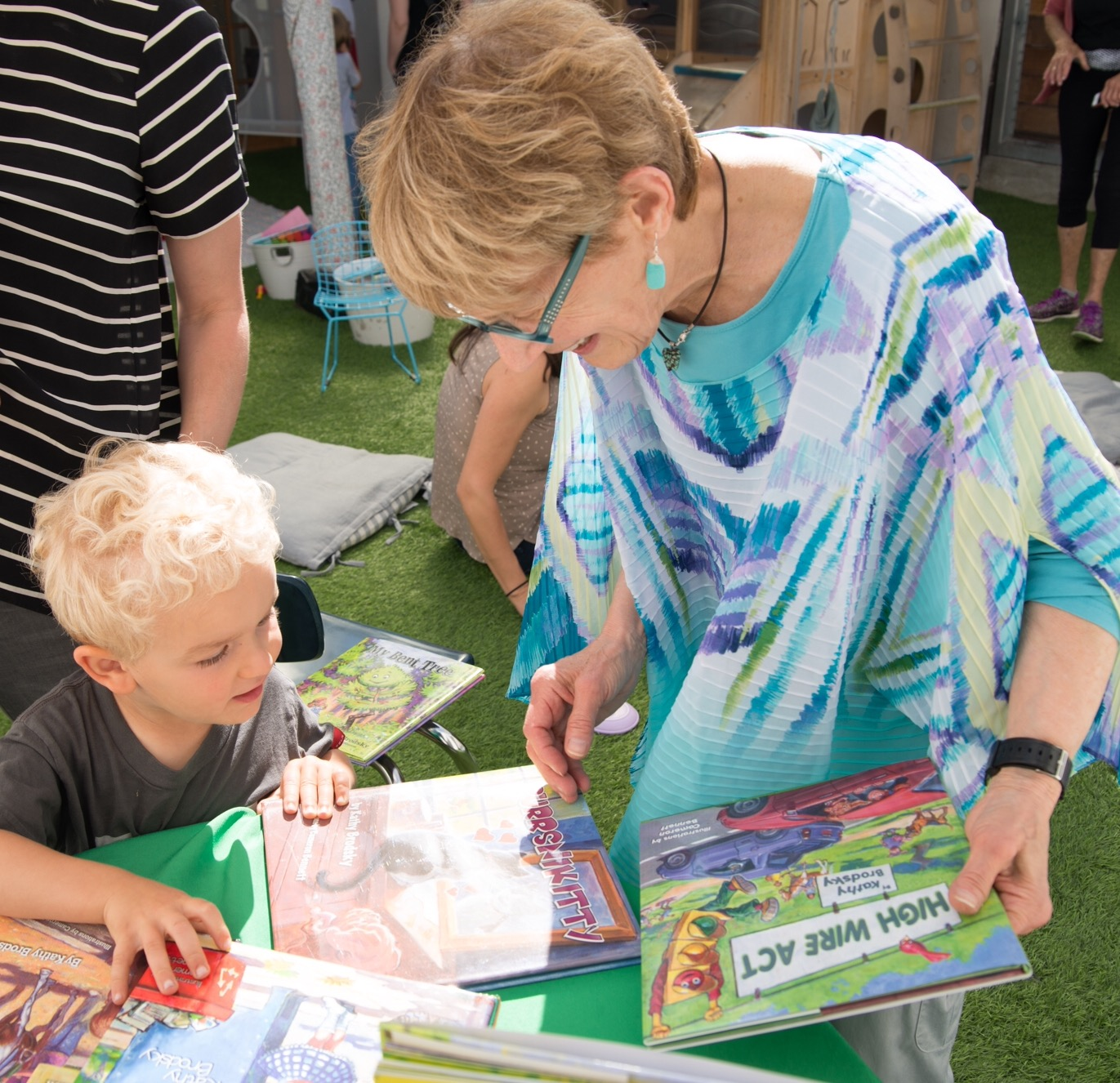
Kathy Brodsky with a young reader at Books and Cookies bookstore in Santa Monica, California, following her book signing in May 2017.

Brodsky's stories reflect her lifelong interest in animals and nature. The characters in them include dogs, cats, pigs, horses, and a talking tree. All stories have discussion questions at the back of the book, so that teachers and parents can talk about the major themes of each book, turning each story into an opportunity for further discussion. The stories cover issues that include peer pressure, healthy eating, and self-confidence.

According to WorldCat, psychological themes found in Brodsky's books include the subjects: self-actualization, self-esteem, self-realization, change, identity, and individual responsibility.

"Because I am a therapist, my books all have very positive messages," Brodsky told the New Hampshire Union Leader in a 2017 interview. Her books focus on topics such as being true to who you are, accepting others who are different, the advantages of unusual friendships and adjusting to change, she told the newspaper.

In a review in the Children's Book Review, Hannah Coloson writes that Brodsky's stories "gently promote conversations about the issues today facing children and families, like childhood obesity, bullying, and the amount of time children spend plugged in."

=== Inspiration for Brodsky's writing ===
Brodsky attributes her 50+ years as a clinical social worker as a partial inspiration for her writing. In an interview with author Rebecca Rule, Brodsky said the stories her clients have told her "often reveal great courage, inner strength and joy." Brodsky said she has witnessed the human struggle to "overcome personal difficulties that started in childhood." "My books for children have messages in them that come from my social work experience...differences, friendship, loyalty, and social action," Brodsky told journalist Michael Cousineau in a 2008 interview in the New Hampshire Sunday News. "I feel very strongly that all of us can be productive and contribute, even if we may be different in some way."

"Kids go through so many changes in their young lives, and my books help teach them how to grow stronger through those difficult times," Brodsky told journalist Kimberly Houghton in a 2017 interview.

Brodsky's books also highlight the importance of safety and kindness — two things that she believes are critical for children to learn at a young age.

==== My Bent Tree ====
A walk in her neighborhood inspired her first children's story, My Bent Tree. She was walking her dog and saw a crooked pine scarred by an old lightning strike. It reminded Brodsky of her own childhood encounter with polio, as well as her many clients' challenges with adversity, yet "reveal great courage, inner strength and joy" by overcoming those challenges. The poem became a reflection upon early life experiences marking us permanently, but also becoming aspects of our lives that help us to grow into who we become.

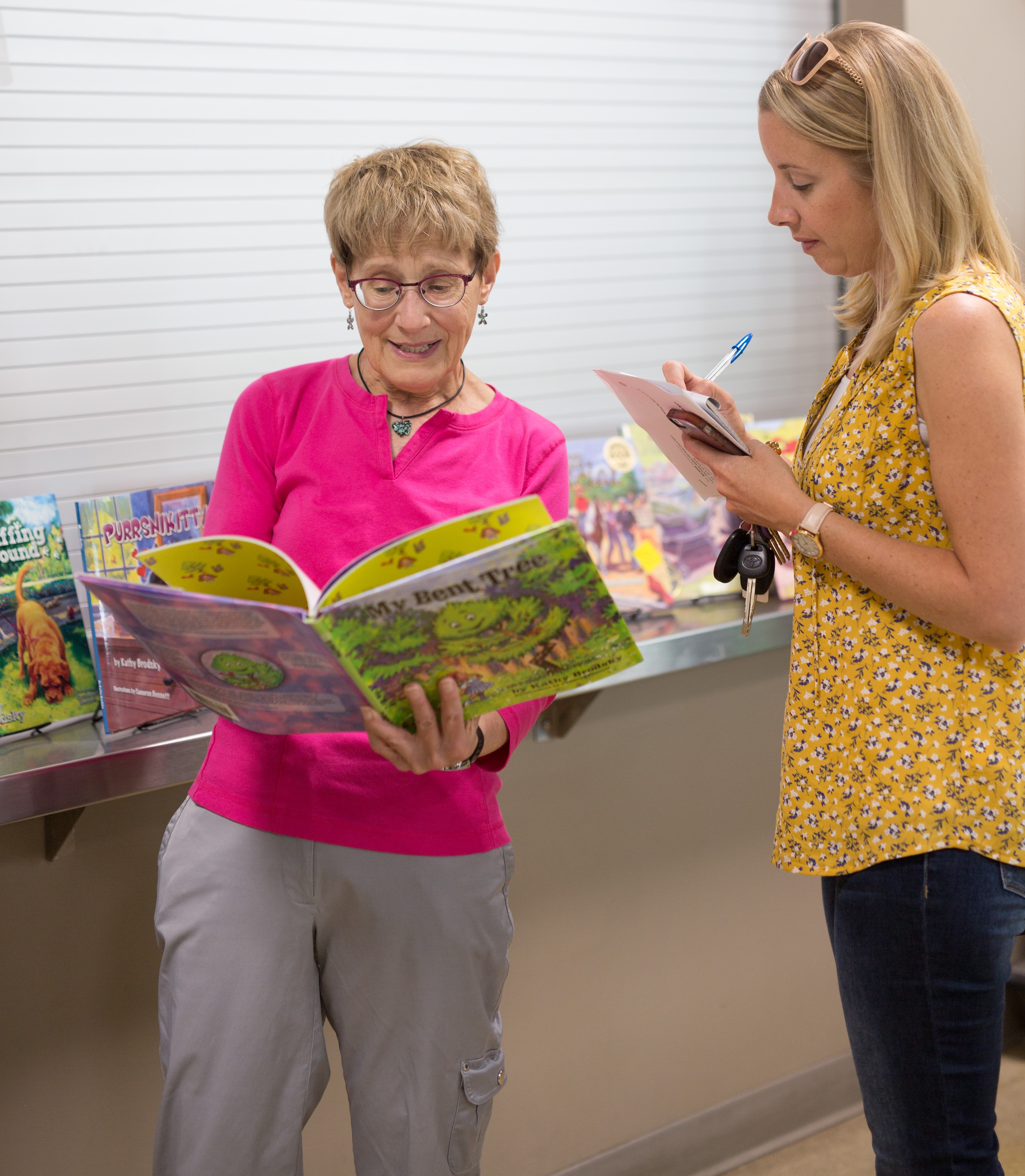
Kathy Brodsky, left, being interviewed by New Hampshire Union Leader correspondent Kimberly Houghton, before Brodsky's reading at the Nashua, NH, Soup Kitchen and Shelter for the Children's Literacy Foundation in August 2017.

In 2018, for a 10th anniversary edition, My Bent Tree was published in a bilingual Spanish/English version - Mi Árbol Doblado / My Bent Tree.

In addition to telling the importance of embracing diversity and overcoming hardships, My Bent Tree also concerns issues of environmentalism. The book received an award at the Green Book Festival, which honors "books that contribute to greater understanding, respect for, and positive action on the changing worldwide environment." It has additionally been showcased by the Children's Book Council. The Girl Scouts magazine The Studio featured My Bent Tree in its article discussing how inspiration can come from anywhere. The Girl Scouts magazine also awarded a Brownie Badge to My Bent Tree under the category "My Best Self" for promoting self-esteem awareness.

My Bent Tree was recorded as a talking book by the Perkins School for the Blind for its students to listen to Brodsky's writing. The Perkins School also published this book in Braille.

While writing My Bent Tree, Brodsky commissioned artist Cameron Bennett to provide full-color illustrations for the story. The two have since collaborated on all of her picture books. Bennett's illustrations are created with acrylic paint on canvas. As a 10th anniversary edition, My Bent Tree was published as a bilingual Spanish-language version - Mi Árbol Doblado / My Bent Tree in 2018.

==== The Inside Story ====
Brodsky's third book, The Inside Story, began as an off-hand comment from a friend. Brodsky asked if her friend would like Brodsky to mail some letters for her, and the friend responded, "they'll be very happy." This led Brodsky to imagine happy letters, excited to go where they are going. Rebecca Rule writes in her review that it is a story "about what happens on those occasions (rare these days, it seems) when one writes and mails a personal letter, told from the point of view of an envelope." This gave Brodsky an opportunity to broach the idea of change and how children can best understand and cope with it. Brodsky explains: "Even though the story is an adventure about recycling and the mail system, I think the main theme is about change. Change is difficult for all of us. Kids often deal with change -- in school, in their families, in their neighborhoods." For its discussion of recycling, the book received a national citation from the Green Book Festival in San Francisco.

==== Just Sniffing Around ====
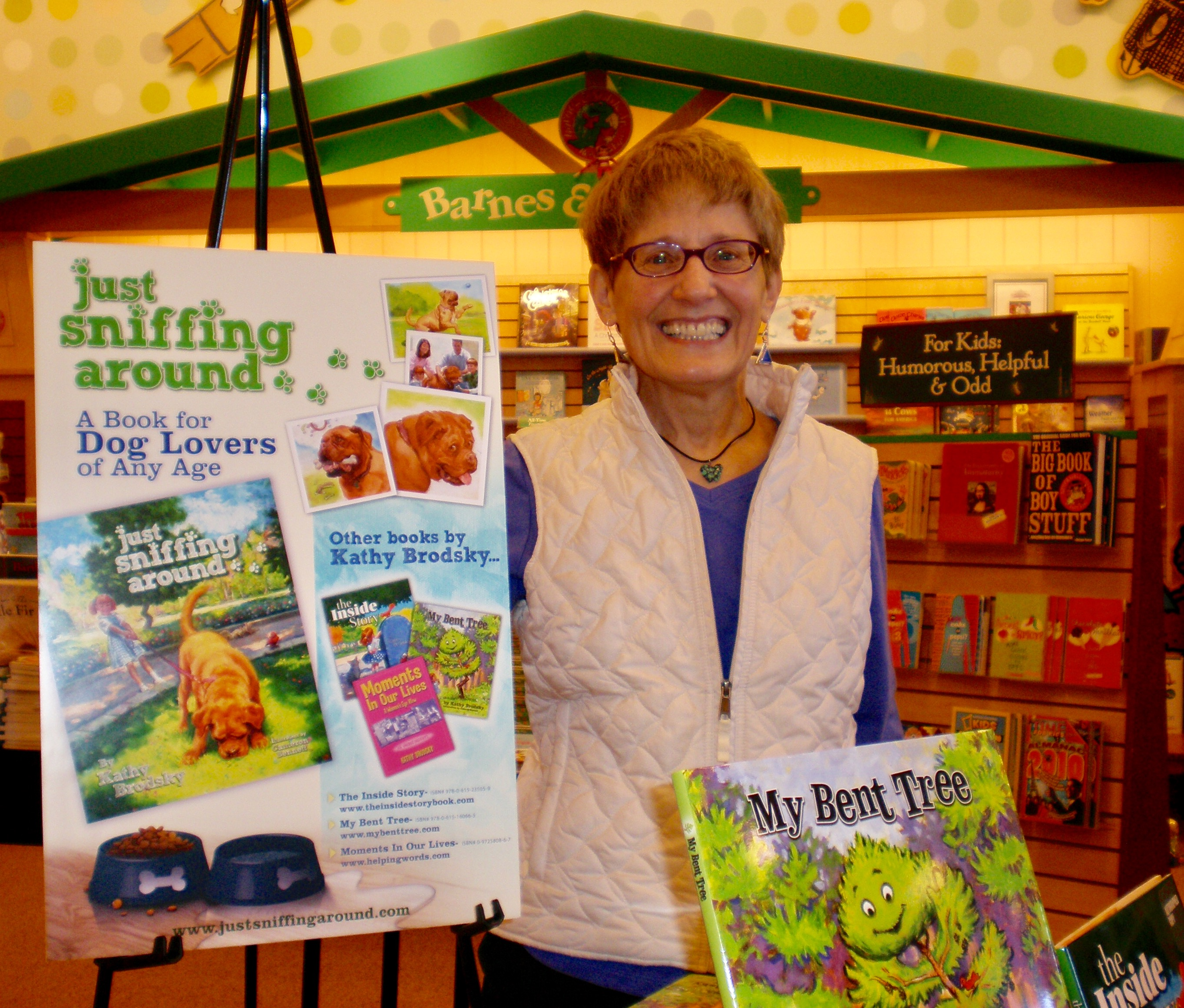
Kathy Brodsky at a Barnes & Noble signing to celebrate the release of Just Sniffing Around, in December 2009.

Her fourth book, Just Sniffing Around, was dedicated to her French mastiff Cali, who died in 2008. The book opens with a picture of Cali, as well as a poem entitled "We are so Lucky to Have Each Other." The illustrations in the book are modeled from Cali. Just Sniffing Around tells the story of a curious dog and the challenges of raising him. The discussion questions in the book focus on the responsibility of pet ownership, as well as the roles dogs play within the lives of their human companions. Pamme Boutselis of Parenting NH magazine writes that the book emphasizes "the special qualities that Brodsky feels these incredible four-legged beings bring to our lives."

==== Purrsnikkity ====
The popularity of Just Sniffing Around brought requests for a companion poem for cat lovers. In response, Brodsky wrote Purrsnikkity, and held a contest to find a cat to be the main character. For every three pictures they submitted of their cat, children were encouraged to donate $5 to a local rescue shelter. The winning cat was selected by illustrator Cameron Bennett to be the model for the illustrations in the book. The Midwest Book Review writes, "Told from the cat's point of view (is there any other?), Pursnikitty presents many recurring themes in tales of pet care and responsible pet ownership." Reviewer Steve McEvoy writes, "this book captures the essence and spirit of a cat and the cat's relationship to the family and the environment it lives in." Brodsky said in a 2010 interview about the book, "the book's messages deal with family interaction and tolerance," noting "how important it is to look beyond first impressions."

==== The Winner Is... ====
Brodsky followed up Just Sniffing Around and Purrsnikkity with a book that combined both with The Winner Is..., a story of a bored dog that reads about a contest for a cat to be the star of a book. Jealousy ensues, and the dog decides to pretend to be a cat in order to enter and win the contest. Reviewer Cindy Donnelly writes, "Any parent of a budding 'star' knows that kids can get excited about winning, and sometimes they get frustrated if they are not the best singer, dancer, speller etc. This book can help them cope with the possibility of not being first place and being happy with who they are and the talents they possess."

Brodsky promoted a contest to find a floppy eared dog, similar to her Cocker Spaniel Sophie, to be the protagonist of the book. Photos of 100 dogs from around the United States were submitted by dog owners for the contest. The winning dog, a one-year-old bloodhound named Gabriel, was selected as the model for the book. Gabriel and his owner, Jim Schoch, are from Contoocook, New Hampshire.Publishers Weekly praised the story's humor and the book's illustrations. The Winner Is... won a "Preferred Choice Award" in the Character Building category from Creative Child Magazine's Creative Toy Awards.

==== Stover ====
Brodsky decided to make a pig the focus of his own book because she thought he would be a great role model. In an interview, she notes, "we have a huge problem with obesity in this country. I thought that Stover would be a great role model for kids. He's a pig who knows how to be fit and eat healthy foods."

Her sixth children's book, Stover, is based on a pig featured in The Winner Is.... The story focuses on Stover's healthy lifestyle, which consists of healthy eating and working out. The book won a "Preferred Choice Award" from Creative Child Magazine in the Health and Fitness Storybook category, and the Children's Book Council spotlighted the book in its "On the Move" showcase, which presented books about "setting and achieving personal and physical wellness goals" for children. The book has received several favorable reviews, both for its poetry, and for its focus on the role of exercise and the dangers of poor eating. Reviewer Christopher Lewis notes the discussion questions at the end of the book "should lead to a discussion about exercise and how exercise can become a part of your life." However, a reviewer from the Edmonton Sun in Alberta, Canada, objected to one illustration in the book that referred to Stover's body self-image.

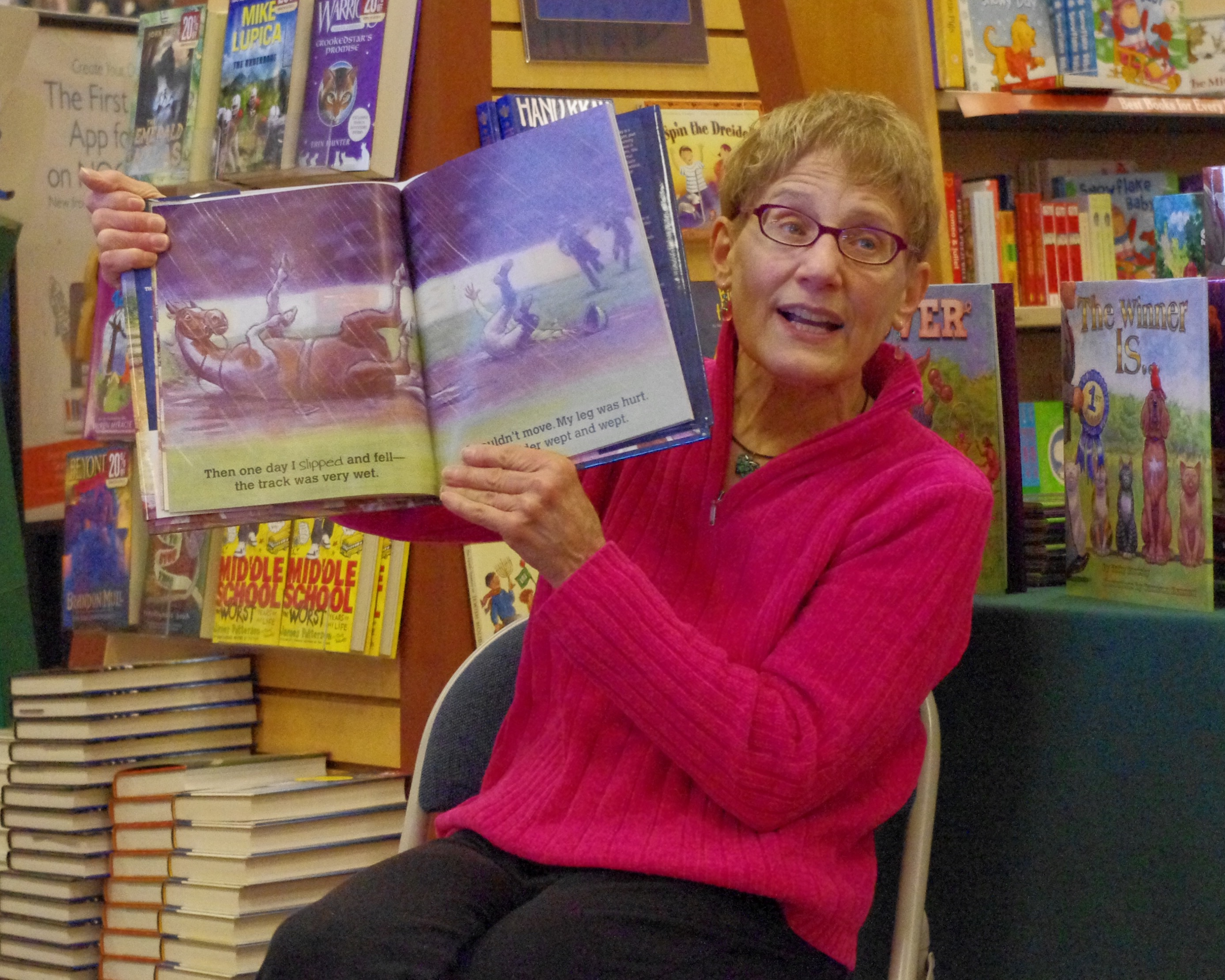
Kathy Brodsky at Barnes & Noble in 2011, reading her book, A Horse Named Special.

==== A Horse Named Special ====
After Just Sniffing Around, Purrsnikitty, and The Winner Is..., Brodsky decided to write a book about horses. For the story, Brodsky held another contest to find a model horse for the book's illustrations, this time with money going towards equine rescue organizations. The book Brodsky wrote, A Horse Named Special, is a story about a race horse who becomes a therapeutic horse and changes the lives of others after an injury. Diane Walters notes in a review, "the relationship between rider and horse is an empowering one: bringing new skills in the mastery of horsemanship, which can be life changing when normal physical limitations or emotional issues are continually a challenge to manage on a daily basis." A Horse Named Special has been showcased by the Children's Book Council. The story has been recommended by the Christopher and Dana Reeve Foundation in its featured booklist on therapy horses, and was cited as a real-life inspiration to children using service horses.

==== A CatFish Tale ====
Brodsky's 2013 book, A CatFish Tale, tells of a cat asked to care for some delicious-looking fish. The story teaches the responsibility of taking care of a pet, as well as the importance of making good choices. In her review, Diane Walters writes, "although clever and fun, also shows how hard it is to have self-control sometimes—especially from a cat's point of view when minding the fish." A CatFish Tale has won several awards, including Creative Child Magazine's Picture Book of the Year. It has also been highlighted by the Children's Book Council's "Silver & Gold: Friends New & Old" booklist, as well as selected by children to be one of the top 10 books on the International Literacy Association and Children's Book Council's "Children's Choices Reading List Award," which allows over 12,000 children to choose their favorite books of the year.

The book and its discussion questions have been praised for helping children understand vital issues of responsibility and compassion. Richard Davidson, psychology professor at the University of Wisconsin–Madison, writes that, "through rhyme, illustration and probing questions, Kathy Brodsky offers a delightful tale of friendship and kindness that will help nurture positive social skills in our children." Bill McManus, a reviewer for The Huffington Post, wrote, "A CatFish Tale is a funny book about unusual friendships. The author is quite talented in her use of rhyme in telling her stories." The book was named the Storytime Pup's "Pick of the Litter" in Story Monsters magazine March 2017 issue.

In early 2017, A CatFish Tale was translated into a Spanish-language edition - El Cuento de Don Gato Pez. El Cuento de Don Gato Pez is the first of Brodsky's books to be translated into Spanish.

==== High Wire Act ====
Brodsky's 2016 High Wire Act tells the story of the personification of a traffic light that is blown down by a strong gust of wind. Watching traffic stand still without it, the traffic light comes to realize its own importance. High Wire Act was named the 2016 Book of the Year by Creative Child Magazine in its life skills category. It was additionally showcased by the Children's Book Council.

Two Arms, Two Legs, Two Feet

Brodsky's 2018 board book Two Arms-Two Legs-Two Feet follows a newborn on a quest to find their family and to discover "Who am I?" "Where do I fit in?" "Where do I belong?"

In 2020, in support of the Black Lives Matter movement, a version was published with a Black baby as the protagonist.

Stover Goes to Camp

Brodsky's 2019 Stover Goes to Camp tells the story of her character Stover the pig going to overnight summer camp for the very first time. Stover goes to Camp Welcome, a very diverse camp where all are welcome, and where all of the campers and counselors are different types of animals. Stover who has never spent any time away from home, gets a chance to experience many new things, including a bout with homesickness. Discussion questions include what it's like for kids to leave home for the first time.

How Talula Turned Her Day Around

Brodsky's 2021 How Talula Turned Her Day Around, tells the story of Talula turtle who doesn't like wearing her mask. It's during the height of the COVID pandemic, and Talula is sad because she can't go to school, and she's missing her friends. Her mom helps Talula come up with a plan to help cope with feelings of isolation, so Talula can look forward to regaining time with friends – even though she has to stay masked. Included discussion questions relate to how kids have about themselves during the pandemic. A separate coloring/activity book was published concurrently.

Stover Learns to Swim

Brodsky's 2022 Stover Learns to Swim book is her third book about Stover the pig. The book follows Stover as he takes swimming lessons for the first time. When he was younger, Stover was thrown into the water, and he has been afraid to swim ever since. Now he's older, and all of his friends know how to swim, so Stover feels ready to learn. The book follows Stover's journey from his initial fear, to being comfortable and feeling safe in the water, to actually swimming. By the end of the book, Stover feels he's ready to swim with friends. Included discussion questions relate to kids feelings about swimming, and what it's like to experience activities they may have been hesitant to try before. A separate coloring/activity book was published concurrently.

=== Brodsky's advice to parents ===
Brodsky told book reviewer Ella Johnson, in a 2011 interview:

Encourage your kids to read, read, read! Then when they're older, they'll have tons of images and stories in their heads. When they're asked to write something, they can 'reach inside' and pull out something in their imagination. That's what happened to me. Writing is whatever you make it, and it's yours. It can be so much fun!

== Public appearances ==
=== Media ===
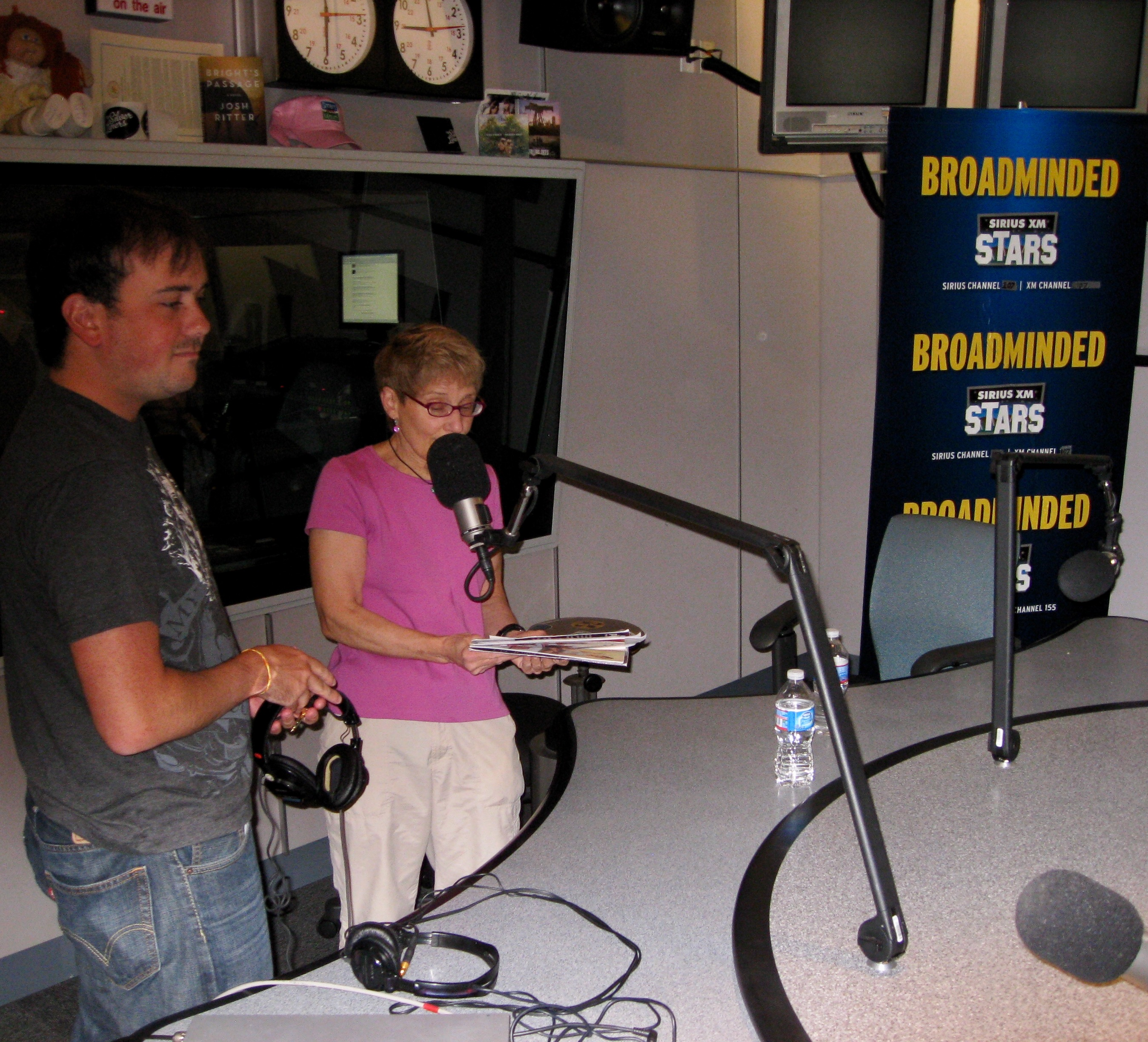
Kathy Brodsky preparing for a live SiriusXM Satellite Radio interview in Washington, D.C.

Brodsky has appeared on a number of radio shows and podcasts to read her books, as well as to discuss the process of writing and what inspires her. She was interviewed on Boston WEMF's "City Wide Blackout" radio program in October 2015, and Los Angeles KKGO FM's "Marie Hulett's Pet Place" radio program in August 2010.

In the summer of 2011 while promoting Stover, Brodsky was interviewed on the national radio programs Musical Soul Food and Daybreak USA. She discussed the process of writing on Broadminded, a live SiriusXM Satellite Radio program on channel 107, and on the "Creative Breakthrough" podcast. Brodsky has recorded both A CatFish Tale and High Wire Act on Sarasota Library's Storycast podcast, and recorded The Winner Is... for Writer's Voices on KRUU-LP radio, Fairfield, Iowa, in April 2011.

In 2017, Story Time Pup recorded A CatFish Tale on its YouTube channel.

=== Presentations ===
Brodsky has been asked to speak at conferences, author's workshops, and public events. She was the keynote speaker at the Child Health Services' Morning Matters annual breakfast. In May 2012, she was the keynote speaker at New Hampshire Public Television (NHPTV)'s PBS Go! Writer's Contest, which promotes children's writing.

In 2008, Brodsky was the keynote speaker at Girls, Inc., where she discussed the writing process and what inspired her to become a writer.

Since 2011, Brodsky has presented four times at the annual Children's Authors Tea, an event promoting "quality family time while also promoting early literacy." The event benefits the Family Resource Center of Central New Hampshire. Brodsky was a presenter for Children's Literacy Foundation's conference. She also regularly speaks at libraries across New England to discuss her books as well as her inspiration for writing.

=== Schools ===
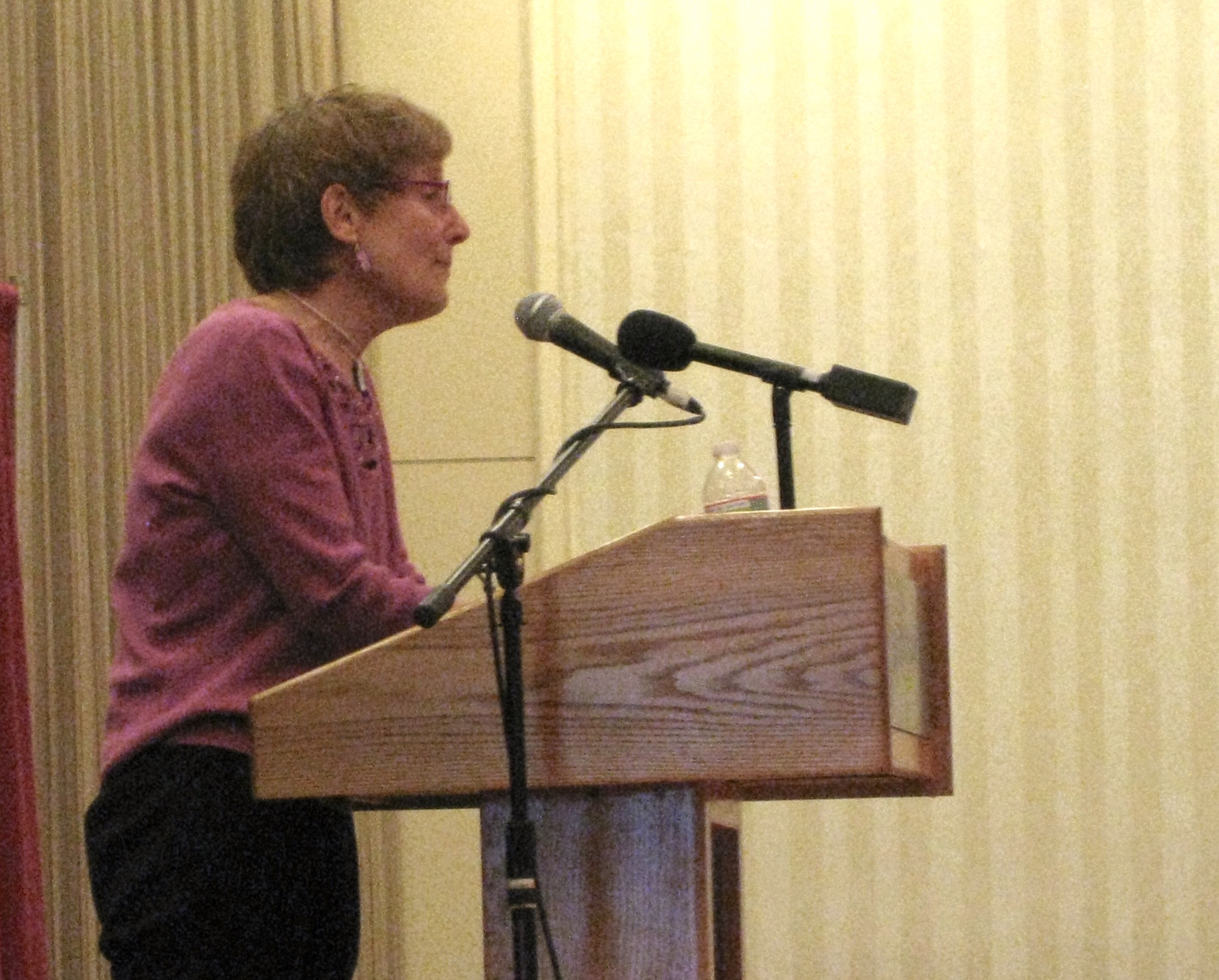
Kathy Brodsky gives the keynote address at Child Health Services’ annual breakfast.

Brodsky has traveled to schools around New England as a storyteller and writer-in-residence. In 2015, she was sponsored by the Children's Literacy Foundation's Year of the Book grant, which provided free books to schoolchildren at her readings. She kicked off the program at Freedom Elementary School's "Read Across America" event. As part of that same program, Brodsky spoke to the Valley View Community School in Farmington, New Hampshire. She was the writer-in-residence at Pierce Elementary School in Bennington, New Hampshire, and the Harold Martin School in Hopkinton, New Hampshire. She has visited events for home-schooled students in Keene, New Hampshire. The Derry Village School Cultural Arts Committee, in Derry, New Hampshire, hosted Brodsky at the Festival of Children's Authors and Illustrators in 2009.

== Charitable activities ==
Brodsky has used her writing to promote animal welfare services in New Hampshire. After writing her book Purrsnikitty, she held a contest to decide what the cat in the book would look like. For every three pictures they submitted of their cat, children were encouraged to donate $5 to a local rescue shelter. The contest raised almost $700, spurring Brodsky to run a second contest to discover a dog to be the inspiration for The Winner is.... This contest was even more successful, bringing in over $2,000 for local dog and cat shelters. She ran a similar contest for A Horse Named Special, where donations were sent to equine rescue organizations in New England. She is a donor to New Hampshire Humanities.

== Personal ==
Brodsky attended Marietta College in Ohio. She then received her Masters of Social Work (MSW) from Simmons College in Boston, Massachusetts. She is a Licensed Clinical Social Worker in private practice in New Hampshire and Massachusetts.

Brodsky is a member of New Hampshire Made, Independent Publishers of New England, the Independent Book Publishers Association, and the Children's Literacy Foundation.

== Books ==
- Moments in Our Lives. 2004. ISBN 978-0972580861
- Moments in Our Lives (Audio CD). 2005. ISBN 978-0977189441
- My Bent Tree. 2007. ISBN 978-0615160665
- The Inside Story. 2009. ISBN 978-0615235059
- Just Sniffing Around. 2009. ISBN 978-0578036205
- The Winner is.... 2010. ISBN 978-0982852903
- Purrsnikitty. 2011. ISBN 978-0578050591
- A Horse Named Special. 2011. ISBN 978-0982852927
- Stover. 2011. ISBN 978-0982852910
- A CatFish Tale. 2012. ISBN 978-0982852934
- High Wire Act. 2015. ISBN 978-0982852965
- El Cuento de Don Gato Pez (Spanish translation of A CatFish Tale). 2016. ISBN 978-0982852972
