= Scott Lephart =

American sports medicine scholar

Scott M. Lephart is an American sports medicine scholar currently the Dean of the University of Kentucky College of Health Sciences and also formerly a Distinguished Professor at University of Pittsburgh.

Lephart earned an undergraduate degree at Marietta College and masters and doctoral degrees in sports medicine at the University of Virginia.
