= 125th Illinois Infantry Regiment =

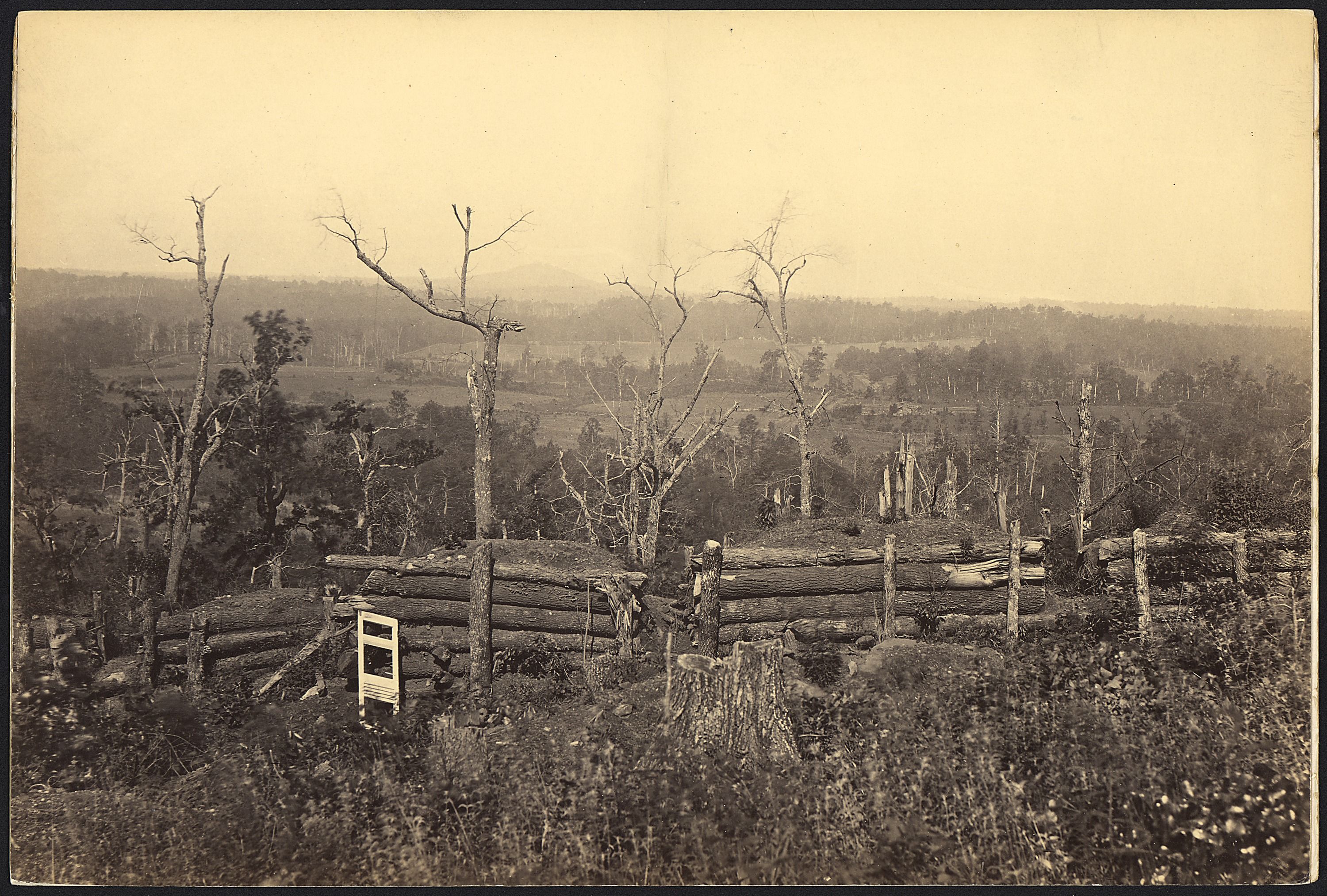
- The regiment suffered many casualties in the Battle of Kennesaw Mountain. George N. Barnard photograph shows field works near Kennesaw.
- Active: 3 September 1862 – 9 June 1865
- Country: United States
- Allegiance: (United States) Union; Illinois
- Branch: Union Army
- Type: Infantry
- Size: Regiment
- Engagements: American Civil War; Battle of Perryville (1862); Battle of Chickamauga (1863); Chattanooga campaign (1863); Knoxville campaign (1863); Atlanta campaign (1864); Battle of Resaca (1864); Battle of Kennesaw Mountain (1864); Battle of Peachtree Creek (1864); Battle of Jonesboro (1864); Sherman's March to the Sea (1864); Carolinas campaign (1865); Battle of Bentonville (1865)

Commanders
- Notable commanders: Oscar Fitzalan Harmon; James Weston Langley

The 125th Illinois Volunteer Infantry was an infantry regiment from Illinois that served in the Union Army during the American Civil War. Soon after mustering into Federal service in September 1862, the regiment fought at Perryville. After being stationed at Nashville, Tennessee, the unit briefly fought at Chickamauga and served in the Chattanooga and Knoxville campaigns in 1863. The regiment participated in the Atlanta campaign in 1864, where it took heavy losses at Kennesaw Mountain. It also fought at Peachtree Creek and Jonesborough. At the end of 1864, it served during Sherman's March to the Sea and in 1865 the unit fought in the Carolinas campaign. The regiment participated in the Grand Review of the Armies before being mustered out of service in June 1865.

== Formation ==
The 125th Illinois Infantry was organized at Danville, Illinois, and mustered in for three years service on 3 September 1862, under the command of Colonel Oscar Fitzalan Harmon of Danville. The other field officers were Lieutenant Colonel James W. Langley of Champaign and Major John B. Lee of Catlin. Other members of the regimental staff were Adjutant William Mann of Danville, Quartermaster Alexander M. Ayers of Urbana, Surgeon John J. McElroy of Catlin, First Assistant Surgeon Charles H. Mills of Champaign, and Chaplain Levi W. Sanders of Vermillion County. There were also 4 sergeant majors, 1 quartermaster sergeant, 1 commissary sergeant, 3 hospital stewards, and 2 principal musicians. Each company had 2 first lieutenants, 2 second lieutenants, 1 first sergeant, 4 sergeants, 8 corporals, and as many as 2 musicians. The men were mostly recruited from Vermillion and Champaign Counties and nearly all could read and write.

Captains of the 125th Illinois Infantry Regiment
Company	Captain
A	Clark Ralston (r-1863), Jackson Charles (k-1864), James P. Brown
B	Robert Steward (r-1862), Stephen Conover (dc-1865)
C	William W. Fellows (k-1864), Andrew W. Ingraham (dd-1865)
D	George W. Holloway
E	Nathan M. Clark (dc-1865), George W. B. Sadorus
F	Frederick B. Sale (r-1863), John B. Lester
G	John H. Gass (r-1862), Josiah Lee (r-1863), Marion Lee (k-1864), Newton Norris
H	Pleasant M. Parks (r-1864), John C. Harbor
I	Levin Vinson (r-1864), Edward B. Kingsbury (mw-1864), James H. Trimmel
K	George W. Cook

- Key: k = Killed in action, mw = mortally wounded, dd = died of disease, dc = discharged, r = resigned, no. = year.

Colonel Harmon was killed on 27 July 1864 at the Battle of Kennesaw Mountain. He replaced in command by Lieutenant Colonel Langley who was brevetted colonel on 13 March 1865. Also killed at Kennesaw were Captains Fellows and Lee. On 19 August 1864, Captain Kingsbury died of wounds received in fighting before Atlanta. On 2 September 1864, Captain Charles was killed at the Battle of Jonesborough. On 15 February 1865, Captain Ingraham died of disease at Savannah, Georgia. Captain Cook was brevetted major on 13 March 1865. Chaplain Sanders was killed in action at Colwell's (Caldwell's) Ford, Tennessee, on 17 November 1863.

== Service ==
=== 1862 ===
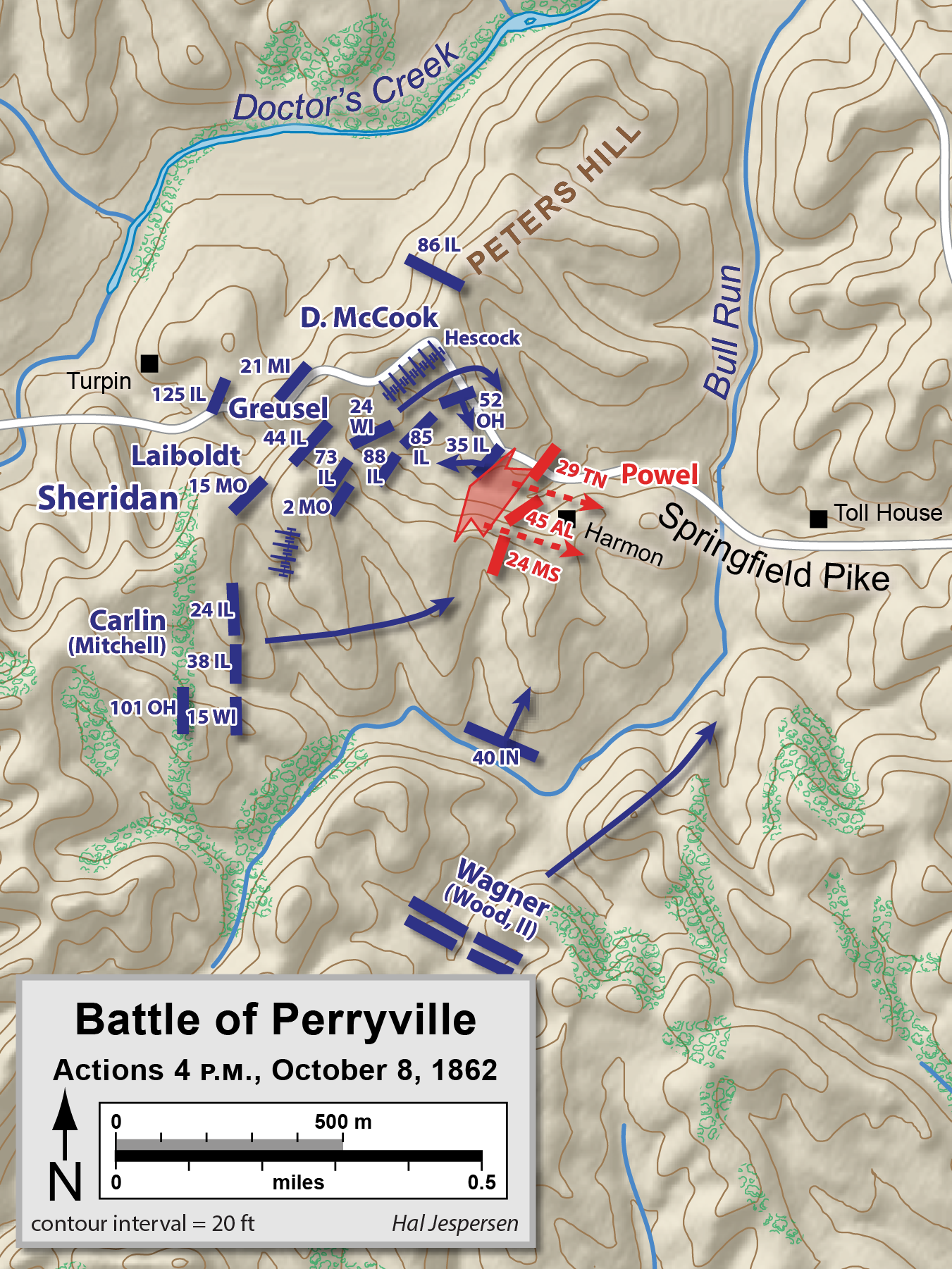
During the 4 pm fight for Peters Hill, the 125th Illinois was well to the rear.

The 125th Illinois Infantry Regiment first moved to Cincinnati, Ohio, then across the Ohio River to Covington, Kentucky, where it relieved a militia unit. Measles soon broke out in camp, killing some soldiers and causing others to be discharged for disability. On 25 September, the regiment traveled to Louisville, Kentucky, via river transport, arriving on 27 September. The next day, the unit was brigaded with the 85th Illinois, 86th Illinois, and 52nd Ohio Infantry Regiments, under the command of Colonel Daniel McCook Jr. The 125th Illinois would serve in the brigade for the remainder of the war, though two regiments would be added later. At first, the regiment was attached to 36th Brigade, 11th Division, Army of the Ohio. Soon after, the 11th Division under Brigadier General Philip Sheridan was assigned to the III Corps under Acting Major General Charles Champion Gilbert with which it fought the Battle of Perryville.

In the pre-dawn hours of 8 October 1862, Army of the Ohio commander, Major General Don Carlos Buell ordered Gilbert to seize Peters Hill. Gilbert passed the order to Sheridan who assigned McCook's brigade to capture the hill. Sheridan had two veteran brigades, but he used McCook's regiments even though they were untried in battle, possibly because he assumed that the hill was unoccupied. Just before dawn, McCook's brigade chased the 7th Arkansas Infantry Regiment off the hill after losing 6 men killed and 27 wounded. At daybreak, there was an artillery duel during which the 125th Illinois supported Barnett's Battery I, 2nd Illinois Artillery and suffered some casualties from shrapnel. The 7th and 5th Arkansas Infantry Regiments counterattacked but were repulsed by McCook's brigade, including rifle fire from the right wing of the 125th Illinois. Late in the afternoon, Sheridan's division was attacked by Colonel Samuel Powell's brigade. Sheridan's division was deployed somewhat haphazardly, with the 125th Illinois far to the rear. Nevertheless, Powell's outnumbered Confederates were beaten and driven away. The 125th Illinois sustained losses of 1 killed and 8 wounded at Perryville.

The 125th Illinois participated in the pursuit of General Braxton Bragg's Confederate army until 16 October, after which it marched to Nashville, where it arrived on 7 November. The regiment soon was ordered to guard Mill Creek, but was back in Nashville by 10 December. McCook's 2nd Brigade did not fight at the Battle of Stones River. It was part of Brigadier General Robert Byington Mitchell's 4th Division, Major General George H. Thomas' Center, and Major General William Rosecrans' Army of the Cumberland.

=== 1863 ===
After January 1863, the Center became the XIV Corps. After June 1863, the regiment was reassigned to McCook's 2nd Brigade, 2nd Division, Reserve Corps. Between 30 June and 18 July, the regiment went to Murfreesboro, Tennessee, before returning to Nashville. It left Nashville on 3 August and marched to the fighting front near Chattanooga, Tennessee. Major General Gordon Granger commanded the Reserve Corps and was a harsh disciplinarian. By 14 September, the Reserve Corps outmarched its wagon train and had no food. Though Granger had forbidden his soldiers to forage, McCook and other officers determined to ignore this unreasonable order. While sitting in front of his tent, Granger noticed two soldiers from the 125th Illinois walk past with meat plundered from a farm. As punishment, he ordered the men to march around a tree, each carrying a fence rail. Seeing other soldiers with stolen food, Granger began arresting every forager his mounted patrol could find and stringing them up by their thumbs. This provoked a near-mutiny. Finally, McCook and Brigadier General James B. Steedman convinced Granger to relent and release their men. After this incident, Granger became extremely unpopular with his soldiers.

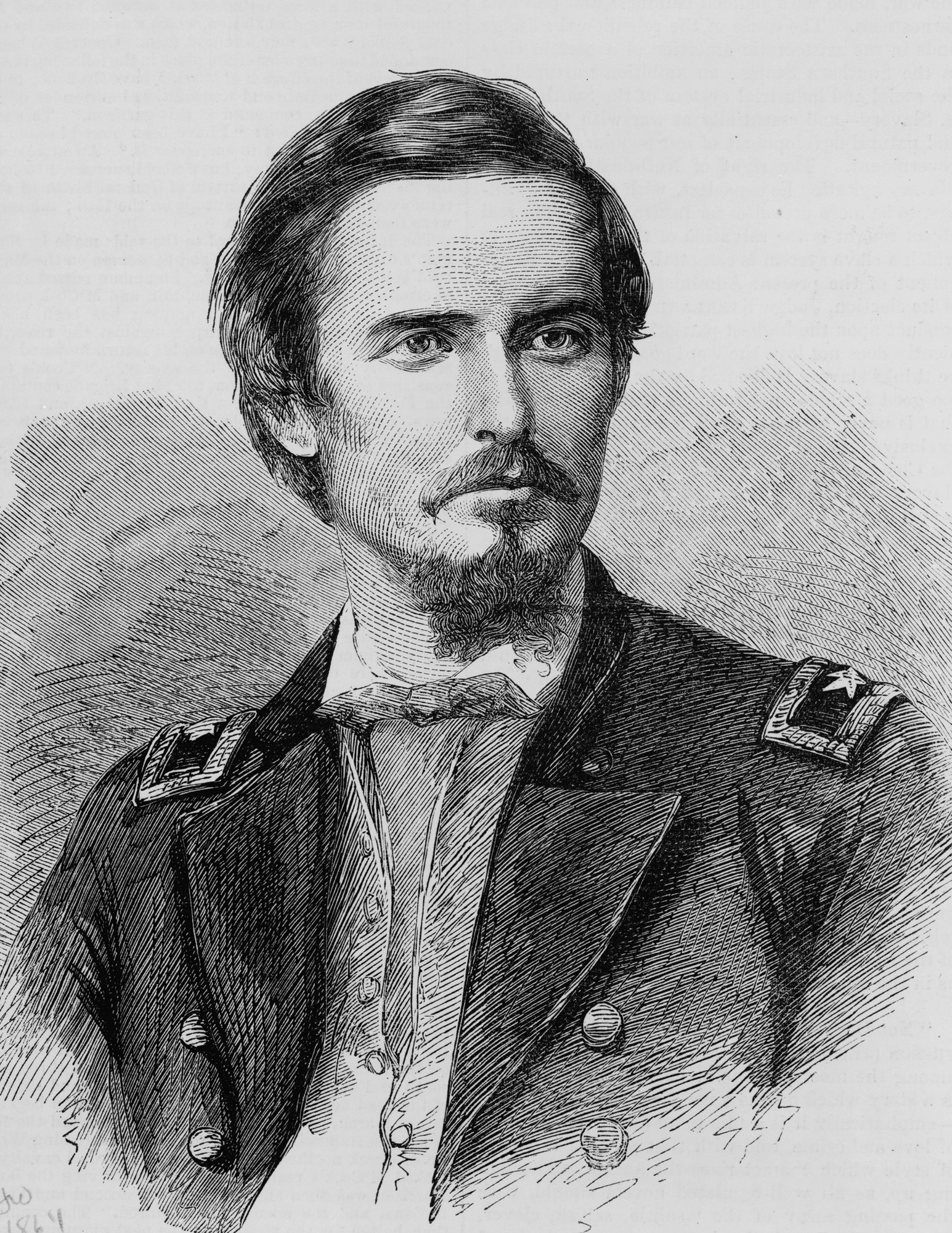
Daniel McCook Jr.

Soon after dawn on the first day (19 September 1863) of the Battle of Chickamauga, McCook ordered his soldiers to burn Reed's Bridge. He soon received orders to retreat, but became convinced that a Confederate brigade was isolated nearby and might be easily captured. He shared his belief with Thomas, who ordered a brigade from his own corps to investigate. By this time, McCook's brigade became involved in a skirmish with Confederate cavalry. McCook's troops made a rapid retreat while avoiding serious casualties. On 20 September, Granger's three brigades were at McAfee Church, about 3 mi (4.8 km) north of Thomas' left flank units. On his own initiative, Granger decided to go to Thomas' assistance with two brigades, leaving McCook's brigade behind. When Thomas' troops finally retreated, they moved north, driving away two Confederate brigades before arriving within the lines of McCook's brigade.

During the Chattanooga campaign from 24 September to 23 November 1863, there was a reorganization and McCook's brigade was reassigned as the 3rd Brigade, 2nd Division, XIV Corps, Army of the Cumberland. The 2nd Division was led by Brigadier General Jefferson C. Davis, XIV Corps was under Major General John Palmer, and the army was commanded by Thomas. The 110th Illinois Infantry was added to McCook's brigade to supplement the original four regiments. While camped at Caldwell's Ford, the regiment was subjected to a surprise bombardment by Confederate artillery. This was soon silenced by answering Union artillery fire, but not before the chaplain was killed and other men were wounded. At this time, the regiment numbered about 600 men. Brigadier General William Farrar Smith utilized McCook's brigade to help establish the Cracker Line, which opened up a supply route to beleaguered Chattanooga. Troops from McCook's brigade provided security and helped build a road. Men from the 85th and 86th Illinois served as oarsmen during the expedition. During the Battle of Missionary Ridge on 23 November, Major General William T. Sherman failed to use Davis' division which was at his disposal. Davis' division led the pursuit after the battle, but the Confederates escaped.

Davis' division participated in the Knoxville campaign. At first, Major General Ulysses S Grant wanted Granger's corps to relieve the Siege of Knoxville, but Grant soon decided to send Sherman to command the expedition with five additional divisions, including the one led by Davis. By 29 November 1863, Sherman's troops reached Charleston, Tennessee. Sherman's 30,000-man army marched 84 mi (135 km) without its artillery, baggage, and wagon train, and the soldiers were compelled to live off the country. On 4 December, Sherman's army began crossing the Little Tennessee River on makeshift bridges because high water made the fords too deep. The Confederate besieging force left the Knoxville area on 4–5 December. Except for Granger's corps, which was left at Knoxville, Tennessee, Sherman ordered his army to return to Chattanooga, which it reached between 16 and 18 December. It was a remarkable feat to complete a relief march in early winter with 30,000 men without a real line of communication.

=== 1864 ===
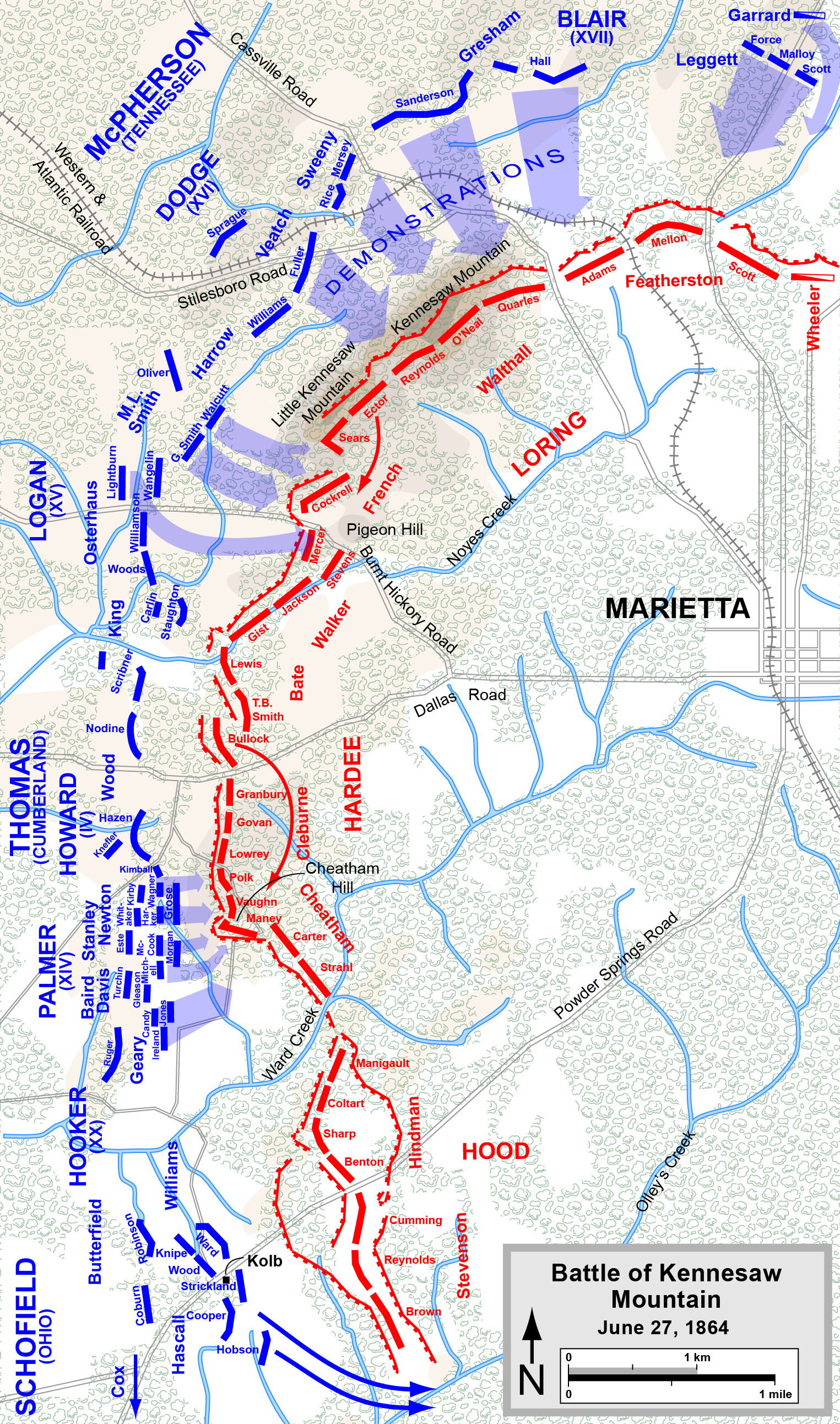
Battle of Kennesaw Mountain, 27 June 1864

McCook's brigade spent January–May 1864 at Lee and Gordon Mill, except for participating in a demonstration against the Confederate defenses covering Dalton, Georgia, on 22–27 February. For the Atlanta campaign, McCook's 3rd Brigade continued being part of Davis' division in XIV Corps under Palmer. The 22nd Indiana Infantry Regiment was added to the five regiments already in McCook's brigade. After the Battle of Resaca, Davis' division was detached from the XIV Corps and directed to march to Rome, Georgia. On 19 May, the soldiers of McCook's brigade crossed the Oostanaula River by raft, by canoe, and by swimming, and occupied Rome. Many men found stores of whisky, got drunk, and began pillaging abandoned businesses.

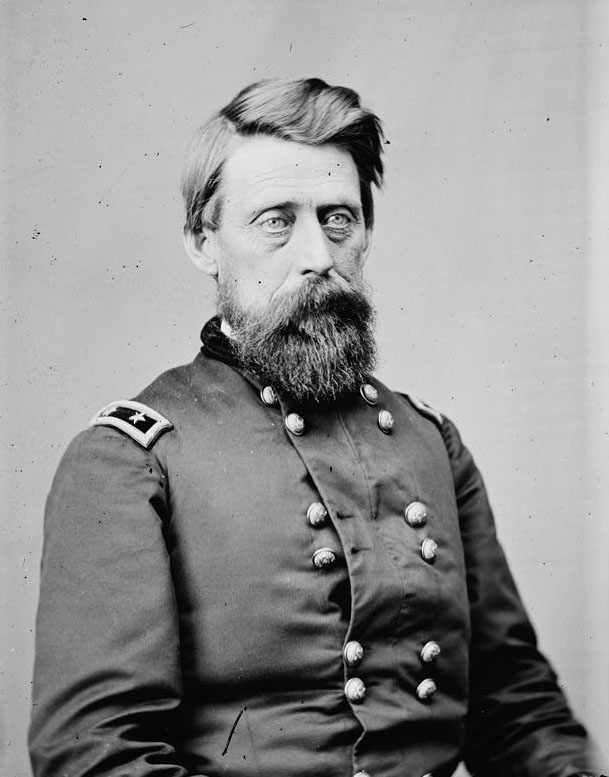
Jefferson C. Davis

Sherman ordered a frontal attack on 27 July 1864. Thomas assigned Davis' division to make the assault, probably because it had not yet made a serious attack in the campaign. Davis selected the brigades of McCook and Colonel John G. Mitchell to make the assault, keeping his third brigade in reserve. Each brigade was deployed with its regiments one behind the other, with one regiment acting as skirmishers in front. At 8 am, Thomas' artillery began bombarding the Confederate position, which was on a hill. Seeing the task that they were being asked to do, the Union soldiers were very quiet. McCook recited the poem Horatius by Thomas Babington Macaulay. The assault columns went forward at 9 am and most of McCook's men reached some dead ground just in front of the hill, but only a few climbed over the parapet, where they were immediately shot down. McCook was shot in the chest and this proved to be a mortal wound; he died twenty days later.

Harmon took command of the brigade and was immediately killed, shot in the heart. The night before the attack, Harmon had written his wife a farewell letter. Harmon was succeeded by Colonel Caleb Dilworth of the 85th Illinois, who ordered a retreat. Most of the survivors scurried back to safety or waited until nightfall to crawl away, but others were pinned down near the Confederate defenses and as many as 200 of McCook's and Mitchell's soldiers surrendered. The 125th Illinois suffered losses of 47 killed, 52 wounded, and 5 missing. Sherman employed 16,225 soldiers in his attack on the Confederate lines and over 2,000 became casualties against only 450 Confederate casualties. Sherman admitted losing "nearly 3,000" in the unsuccessful assault. Davis' division alone lost 824 killed and wounded plus prisoners.

On 19 July 1864, the day before the Battle of Peachtree Creek, Dilworth's brigade sustained 245 casualties while capturing a hill that dominated the Howell's Mill crossing. This was during a movement where Thomas' army crossed Peachtree Creek and began taking positions on its south side. By the next day, Palmer had the XIV Corps entrenched. Instead, the Confederates attacked Hooker's XX Corps and one division of the IV Corps and were repulsed. During the Battle of Utoy Creek, Palmer resigned his command in a dispute over rank; he was replaced in command of the XIV Corps by Davis. At the Battle of Jonesborough on 1 September, Davis' corps made a major assault. On the right, Brigadier General James D. Morgan's division (formerly Davis') charged with Dilworth's brigade on the right, Mitchell's in the center, and Colonel Charles M. Lum's brigade on the left. On the left were the divisions of Brigadier Generals Absalom Baird and William P. Carlin. The 125th Illinois was the center regiment of the 3rd Brigade, with the 22nd Indiana to its right and the 52nd Ohio to its left, and with the 85th and 86th Illinois in the second line. Dilworth was badly wounded at the start and replaced in command by Langley. It was the only successful frontal assault in the Atlanta campaign, capturing an entire Confederate brigade and part of another. Mitchell's and Dilworth's (Langley's) men captured Swett's Mississippi Battery.

At different times during the Atlanta campaign, the 125th Illinois infantry was led by Major John Lee, Lieutenant Colonel Langley, and Captain Cook. The brigade took part in operations against the Confederate army in northern Georgia and northern Alabama in the period 29 September–3 November. Before Sherman's March to the Sea, the Union army was organized into two wings, the Army of Georgia under Major General Henry Warner Slocum and the Army of the Tennessee under Major General Oliver Otis Howard. Slocum's army consisted of the XX Corps and the XIV Corps. The operation wrecked Georgia's ability to supply the Confederate armies and lasted from 15 November to 21 December when Savannah, Georgia, was occupied. During the march, there were skirmishes at Louisville on 30 November and Cuyler's Plantation on 9 December.

=== 1865 ===
The regiment participated in the Carolinas campaign from January to April 1865. In the campaign, the 3rd Brigade was led by Colonel Benjamin D. Fearing, and later by Langley. When Langley was not commanding the 125th Illinois, it was led by Cook. The regiment fought at the Battle of Bentonville on 19–21 March. Sherman's forces occupied Goldsboro, North Carolina, on 24 March and Raleigh on 14 April. General Joseph E. Johnston surrendered the Confederate army at Bennett Place on 26 April. Sherman's army marched to Washington, D.C. between 29 April and 19 May, and took part in the Grand Review of the Armies on 24 May 1865. The 125th Illinois Infantry mustered out of service on 9 June 1865, after which it traveled by railroad to Chicago. The regiment lost a total of 204 men during service; 9 officers and 88 enlisted men were killed or mortally wounded, while 3 officers and 104 enlisted men died of disease. A total of 1,470 men were enrolled in the regiment during its existence.

== See also ==
- List of Illinois Civil War units
- Illinois in the Civil War
