= Putnam Bridge =

Putnam Bridge may refer to:

Bridges:

- William H. Putnam Memorial Bridge, a highway bridge in Connecticut, United States
- Putnam Street Bridge, a historical crossing in Marietta, Ohio, United States
- A bridge of the New York and Putnam Railroad formerly crossing the Harlem River in New York City, United States

Other:

- Putnam's Bridge, a song by Dave Eggar
