= Douglas Putnam =

American Army colonel (1838–1918)

- Born: August 21, 1838
- Died: August 11, 1918 (aged 79)
- Education: Marietta College
- Military career
- Allegiance: United States
- Branch: Union Army

Douglas Putnam (August 21, 1838 – August 11, 1918) was a U.S. Army colonel in the American Civil War. After serving at the Battle of Shiloh he became a member of General Ulysses S. Grant's staff. Douglas was the son of Douglas and Mary A. (Hildreth) Putnam, both from Ohio. His mother was the daughter of the Doctor and historian Samuel Hildreth, from Marietta, Ohio.

Putnam attended Marietta College and graduated in 1859. In 1861 he entered the volunteer army and commanded the Ninety-Second Ohio Volunteer Infantry, during the Chattanooga campaign. He was wounded at the Battle of Missionary Ridge, and subsequently mustered out in 1864 with the rank of Lieutenant-Colonel. Putnam was also a historian and writer and produced several historical works, including an eyewitness account of the Battle of Shiloh.

== Family and early life ==
Douglas Putnam's grandfather was Israel Putnam, an American army officer and general, who fought at the Battle of Bunker Hill during the American Revolutionary War. Putnam's father, Douglas Putnam Senior, resided in Harmar, Ohio, which at that time was the western part of the town of Marietta. Putnam Senior married Mary Ann Hildreth in the early 1820s, with their marriage producing five children. Samuel and Benjamin Putnam were Douglas' older brothers. His two sisters were Catherine Hildreth, and Elizabeth Perkins Putnam.

== Civil War ==
During the winter of 1861–1862 Putnam was stationed in Cairo, Illinois. As Paymaster he worked in an office on the same floor connecting with the office of Ulysses S. Grant, where he first met him when he was then a brigadier general. While in Cairo he also met and came to know John Rawlins (Note: Rawlins would later become Secretary of War under President Grant.) who was a captain, along with Colonels John McClernand and Lew Wallace and other Civil War notables. Here Putnam also became a good friend and companion of Major Hoyt Sherman, the younger brother of William T. Sherman. (Note: Sherman was Brigadier General of the 5th Division, consisting of four brigades.) The two brothers up to that point had not seen each other in eleven years; Putnam witnessed and wrote about their reunion.

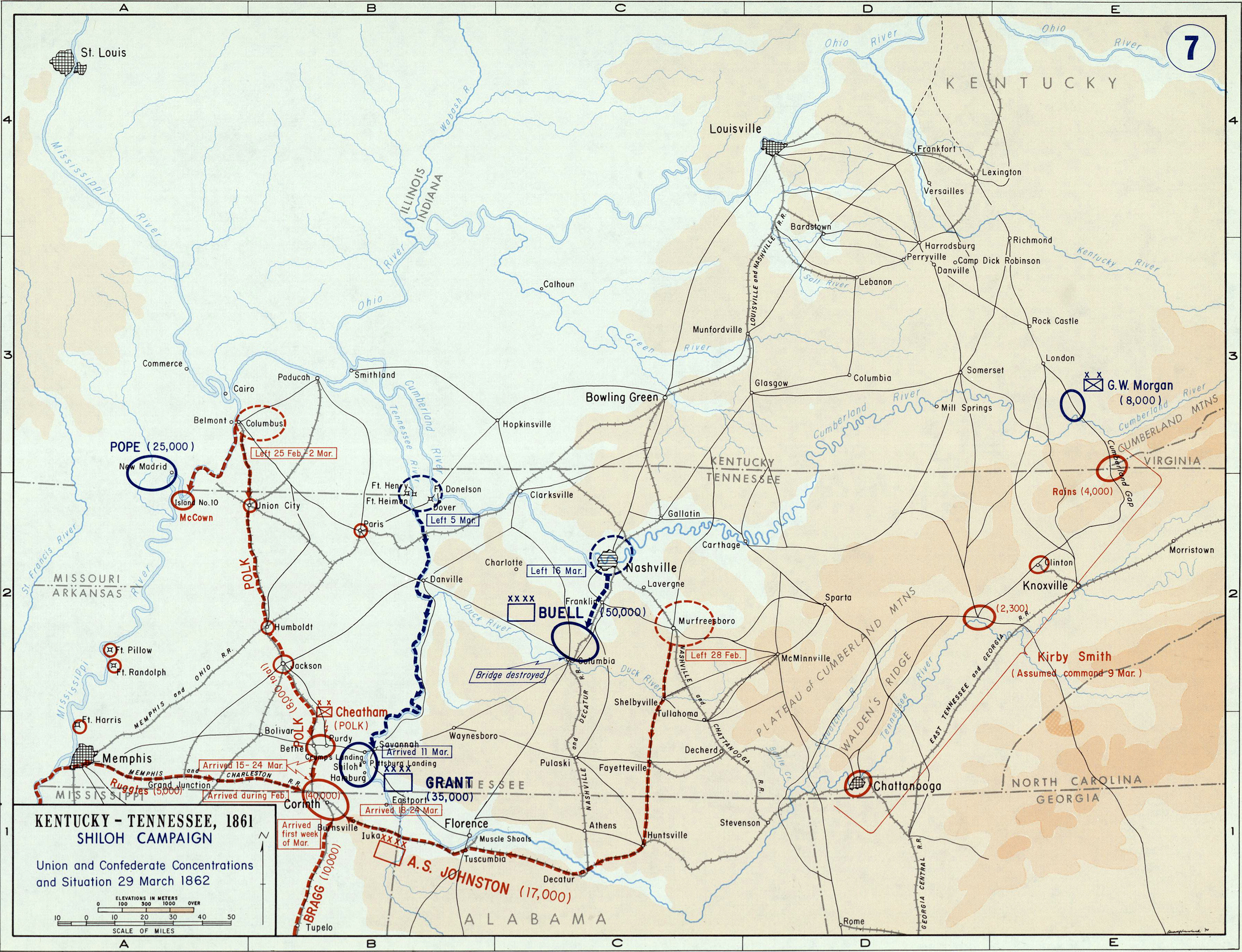
Battle of Shiloh

In 1861 Putnam entered the volunteer army and served as Paymaster's clerk. That year he organized the Ninety-Second Ohio Volunteer Infantry, which he commanded during the Chattanooga campaign while serving as Adjutant.

In the days before the Battle of Shiloh in 1862 Putnam was still a Paymaster, and distributed pay to the soldiers as they arrived at Pittsburg Landing on the Tennessee River, up until April 5, the day before the fighting began. When the battle commenced Putman boarded a steam boat and was then invited by General Grant to join him on the field as his aide. He was present and heard General Grant instruct Captain Baxter to set out and find General Wallace, who was expected to be present, and to relay verbal orders to Wallace to bring his division up. This is when Wallace declined the orders insisting that they be written, resulting in his division being absent during battle. Controversy exists as to whether this allowed the Confederates to prevail resulting in a Union retreat on the first day of the battle. That evening, after the battle and the costly Union retreat, Putnam claims that Grant had remained "cool and collected as if all were going as he had planned".

Putnam also fought in the Battle of Missionary Ridge under General Ulysses S. Grant. As part of Brigadier General John B. Turchin's brigade, Putnam led the 92nd Regiment Ohio Volunteer Infantry up the steep slope of the ridge, but while cheering his men forward, was severely wounded as he neared the summit.

Putnam would later publish an eyewitness account of the Battle of Shiloh, entitled Reminiscences of the Battle of Shiloh, published in 1890. In the narrative Putnam always referred to himself as "the writer".

== Domestic life ==
In 1869 Putnam moved to Ashland, Kentucky and started up a railroad business, the Lexington and Big Sandy Railroad Co., which later became the Ashland Iron & Mining Co., the latter of which he was president. He also became president of the Ashland Coal & Iron Railway until 1900 when he retired. His two sons, L. R. Putnam and D. G. Putnam were general manager of the Ashland Steel company and president of the Ohio Valley Milling & Supply Co. respectively, both located in Ashland. Putnam also served as a member of the Ashland City Council, and the Ashland School Board, and was active in advancing history course in Ashland's public schools.

Putnam was an active member of the Loyal Legion, an organization of Officers of the Civil War. (Note: The Loyal Legion is the third-oldest hereditary military society in the United States after the Society of the Cincinnati and the Aztec Club of 1847.) He attended the First Presbyterian Church in Ashland, which he supported for almost fifty years. Douglas Putnam died in his Ashland, Kentucky home, at the age of 79.

== See also ==
- William R. Rowley (Putnam's Galena neighbor, friend and fellow staff member for Ulysses S. Grant)
- Bibliography of Ulysses S. Grant
- List of American Civil War battles

== Bibliography ==
- Daniel, Larry J. (2008). Shiloh: The Battle That Changed the Civil War. Simon and Schuster. ISBN 978-1-4391-2861-9.
- Eicher, David J. (2001). The Longest Night: A Military History of the Civil War. New York: Simon & Schuster. ISBN 0-684-84944-5.
- McDonough, James Lee (1989). Chattanooga: A Death Grip on the Confederacy. Univ. of Tennessee Press. ISBN 978-0-8704-9630-1.
- Putnam, Douglas (1890). Sketches of War History, 1861–1865 – Papers Read Before the Ohio Commandery of the Military Order of the Loyal Legion of the United States, Volume 3. Military Order of the Loyal Legion of the United States. Ohio Commandery; R. Clarke & Company.
- Reid, Whitelaw (1868). Ohio in the War: Her Statesmen, Her Generals, and Soldiers. Cincinnati, OH: Moore, Wilstach, & Baldwin.
- Shoemaker, Ethan (2011). Among Them That Was; Samuel Hildreth Putnam and the Civil War (PDF). Marietta Library.
- Year-book of the Ohio Society of the Sons of the American Revolution. Sons of the American Revolution. Ohio State Society. 1919.
- Iron Age, Volume 102, Part 1. Chilton Company. 1918.

Further reading

- Official Army Register of the Volunteer Force of the United States Army for the Years 1861, '62, '63, '64, '65. Part V: Ohio, Michigan. Washington, D.C.: Adjutant General's Office. 1865. OCLC 686779.
- Brown, Emma Elizabeth (1885). Life of Ulysses Simpson Grant. D. Lothrop & Company.
- Headley, Joel Tyler (1879). The Life and Travels of General Grant. Hubbard bros.
