= 92nd Ohio Infantry Regiment =

- Active: August 1862 to June 19, 1865
- Country: United States
- Allegiance: Union
- Branch: Infantry
- Engagements: Tullahoma Campaign; Chickamauga Campaign; Battle of Chickamauga; Chattanooga campaign; Battle of Missionary Ridge; Atlanta campaign; Battle of Resaca; Battle of Dallas; Battle of New Hope Church; Battle of Allatoona; Battle of Kennesaw Mountain; Battle of Peachtree Creek; Siege of Atlanta; Battle of Jonesborough; Sherman's March to the Sea; Carolinas campaign; Battle of Bentonville

The 92nd Ohio Infantry Regiment, sometimes 92nd Ohio Volunteer Infantry (or 92nd OVI) was an infantry regiment in the Union Army during the American Civil War.

== Service ==
The 92nd Ohio Infantry was organized at Camp Marietta in Marietta and Gallipolis, Ohio August through September 1862 and mustered in on October 1, 1862, for three years service under the command of Colonel Nelson H. Van Vorhes.

The regiment was attached to District of the Kanawha, Department of the Ohio, to December 1862. 2nd Brigade, Kanawha Division, Department of the Ohio, to February 1863. Crook's Brigade, Baird's Division, Army of Kentucky, Department of the Cumberland, to June 1863. 3rd Brigade, 4th Division, XIV Corps, Army of the Cumberland, to October 1863. 1st Brigade, 3rd Division, XIV Corps, to June 1865.

The 92nd Ohio Infantry mustered out of service at Washington, D.C. on June 19, 1865.

== Detailed service ==
Companies A, B, and C on garrison duty at Gallipolis, Ohio, September. Ordered to Point Pleasant, Va., October 7, 1862. March to Charleston, Va., October 14-November 16, 1862. Duty at Camp Vinton until January 1, 1863. Moved to Tompkin's Farm and Colesworth January 1–3. Moved to Nashville, Tenn., January 7–22, and duty there until February 17. Moved to Carthage, Tenn., February 17, and duty there until June 5. Moved to Murfreesboro, Tenn.. June 5. Tullahoma Campaign June 23-July 7. Hoover's Gap June 24–26. Tullahoma June 29–30. Occupation of middle Tennessee until August 16. Passage of the Cumberland Mountains and Tennessee River and Chickamauga Campaign August 16-September 22. Near Graysville September 10. Catlett's Gap September 15–18. Battle of Chickamauga September 19–21. Siege of Chattanooga, Tenn., September 24-November 23. Reopening Tennessee River October 26–29. Brown's Ferry October 27. Chattanooga-Ringgold Campaign November 23–27. Orchard Knob November 23–24. Missionary Ridge November 25. Pursuit to Graysville November 26–27. At Chattanooga until February 22, 1864. Demonstration on Dalton, Ga., February 22–27. Tunnel Hill, Buzzard's Roost Gap, and Rocky Faced Ridge February 23–25. Atlanta Campaign May 1 to September 8. Demonstrations on Rocky Faced Ridge May 8–11. Buzzard's Roost Gap May 8–9. Battle of Resaca May 14–15. Advance on Dallas May 18–25. Operations on line of Pumpkin Vine Greek and battles about Dallas, New Hope Church, and Allatoona Hills May 25-June 5. Operations about Marietta and against Kennesaw Mountain June 10-July 2. Pine Hill June 11–14. Lost Mountain June 15–17. Assault on Kennesaw June 27. Ruff's Station, Smyrna Camp Ground, July 4. Chattahoochie River July 5–17. Peachtree Creek July 19–20. Siege of Atlanta July 22-August 25. Utoy Creek August 5–7. Flank movement on Jonesboro August 25–30. Battle of Jonesboro August 31-September 1. Operations against Hood in northern Georgia and northern Alabama September 29-November 3. March to the sea November 15-December 10. Siege of Savannah December 10–21. Campaign of the Carolinas January to April 1865. Fayetteville, N.C., March 11. Battle of Bentonville March 19–21. Occupation of Goldsboro March 24. Advance on Raleigh April 10–14. Occupation of Raleigh April 14. Bennett's House April 26. Surrender of Johnston and his army. March to Washington, D.C., via Richmond, Va., April 29-May 20. Grand Review of the Armies May 24.

== Casualties ==
The regiment lost a total of 244 men during service; 4 officers and 47 enlisted men killed or mortally wounded, 1 officer and 192 enlisted men died of disease.

== Commanders ==
- Colonel Nelson H. Van Vorhes - resigned March 22, 1863
- Colonel Benjamin Dana Fearing
- Lieutenant Colonel Douglas Putnam - commanded during the Chattanooga campaign
- Lieutenant Colonel John C. Morrow

== See also ==
- Douglas Putnam (Organized the 92nd infantry)
- List of Ohio Civil War units
- Ohio in the Civil War
