= Benjamin D. Fearing =

American army officer of the Civil War

BG Benjamin Dana Fearing
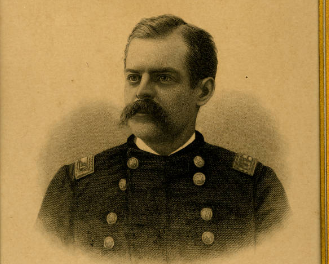
- Born: October 10, 1837; Harmar, Ohio, United States
- Died: December 9, 1881 (aged 44); Harmar, Ohio, United States
- Education: Marietta College
- Relatives: Paul Fearing
- Military career
- Allegiance: United States (Union)
- Branch: United States Volunteers
- Service years: 1861–1865
- Rank: Brevet Brig. General
- Unit: XIV Corps
- Commands: 92nd Ohio Infantry Regiment
- Conflicts: American Civil War; Battle of Manassas; Battle of Shiloh; Battle of Hoover's Gap; Battle of Chickamauga; Atlanta Campaign; Carolinas Campaign; Battle of Averasborough; Battle of Bentonville

Signature
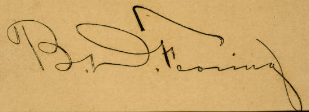

Brevet Brigadier General Benjamin Dana Fearing (October 10, 1837 – December 9, 1881) was a officer of the Union during the American Civil War.

== Biography ==
Fearing was born in Harmar, Ohio, on October 10, 1837. Fearing was the youngest among five brothers, the son of a prominent Ohio family. His paternal grandfather, Paul Fearing, was the first lawyer to move to the Ohio territory and the first delegate from there to the National Congress; and his maternal grandfather, Benjamin Dana whom he was named after, was a prominent founder of the town of Marietta, Ohio.

Fearing graduated from Marietta College at the age of 19 in 1856. Afterwards he moved to Cincinnati, Ohio, and later moved to Philadelphia, engaging in business for three years in the wholesale book and publishing business.

=== American Civil War ===
In 1861, the news of the Battle of Fort Sumter, and the onset of the Civil War, came to Fearing while he was traveling in Cincinnati. He joined with the Zouave Guards, a volunteer organization and was attached to the Ohio 2nd regiment upon arriving in Washington, D.C., already a corporal. His first deployment would be at the Battle of Manassas. He was quickly transferred to the 36th Ohio Infantry Regiment as a drill-master. Additionally, he would serve as an adjutant general to both General Slemmer and Major Andrews for three months alongside his drill-master duties.

Fearing's distinguished service saw him promoted to Major of the 77th Ohio Infantry Regiment with commendations by General Sherman for his ability in bridging operations and making corduroy roads.

At the Battle of Shiloh Church, Fearing commanded a regiment of skirmishers that held a ridge to the right of the church. General Sherman would personally send Fearing the order to retreat, going on to note his 'unyielding tenacity,' which would eventually earn him a promotion to Lieutenant Colonel, and then Colonel on March 22, 1863, of the 92nd Ohio Infantry Regiment. He was placed in command of three regiments of the Fourteenth Corps at the Battle of Hoover's Gap which were ordered to hold the gap.

Fearing suffered a severe wound at the Battle of Chickamauga, taking a minie bullet to the leg; but he was able to return to service, despite the wound hampering him for the rest of his life. On December 2, 1864 President Abraham Lincoln appointed him Brigadier-General by brevet for his conduct in the Atlanta Campaign. Fearing commanded a brigade through Sherman's March to the Sea. Afterwards, he commanded the Third Brigade, Fourteenth Corps during the Carolinas Campaign until he received a disabling wound to his right hand at the Battle of Averasborough; his horse was shot out from under him and he lost several fingers from another minie bullet. He would suffer one more injury at the Battle of Bentonville.

Fearing was mustered out of service on May 19, 1865.

=== Post-War ===
After the War, Fearing worked in manufacturing in Cincinnati but would continue suffering from his Chickamauga and Bentonville wounds. He would continue to do so until his health began to fail in 1877. In 1879, he offered his experience and services to Marietta College for free where he was appointed as an instructor of military tactics. While working as an instructor at the college he was made an honorary member of the Alpha Digamma Society at the College.

In September 1788, a local property dispute, that would be dubbed the 'Battle of Van Bergen Farm,' drew Fearing into a public dispute with another prominent Civil War icon of Washington County, Ohio. Fearing supported one side while BG Rufus Dawes backed the other, creating a battle of influence that devolved into sensationalism over what was widely considered a petty fence line.

Fearing also worked to secure the nomination of John Sherman for President of the United States for a short period in early 1880, but ultimately became disgusted with politics before his health began to fail once more. As Fearing's health declined he began engaging in literary pursuits from home.

On February 8, 1881, Fearing was struck with paralysis along the left side of his body. His health recovered for a short period, but on August 4 of that year he suffered what was viewed as a second stroke. This stroke left him speechless and incapable, with no signs of recovery, until his death on December 9, 1881, in his home in Marietta, Ohio.

== Legacy ==
Following the Civil War, several officers wrote of Fearing's bravery and capability as a soldier. Sherman praised him as, "the bravest man who fought on Shiloh's field" and McClurg wrote in his The Last Chance of the Confederacy that Fearing's brigade may have been solely responsible for winning the Battle of Bentonville, where he received another injury.

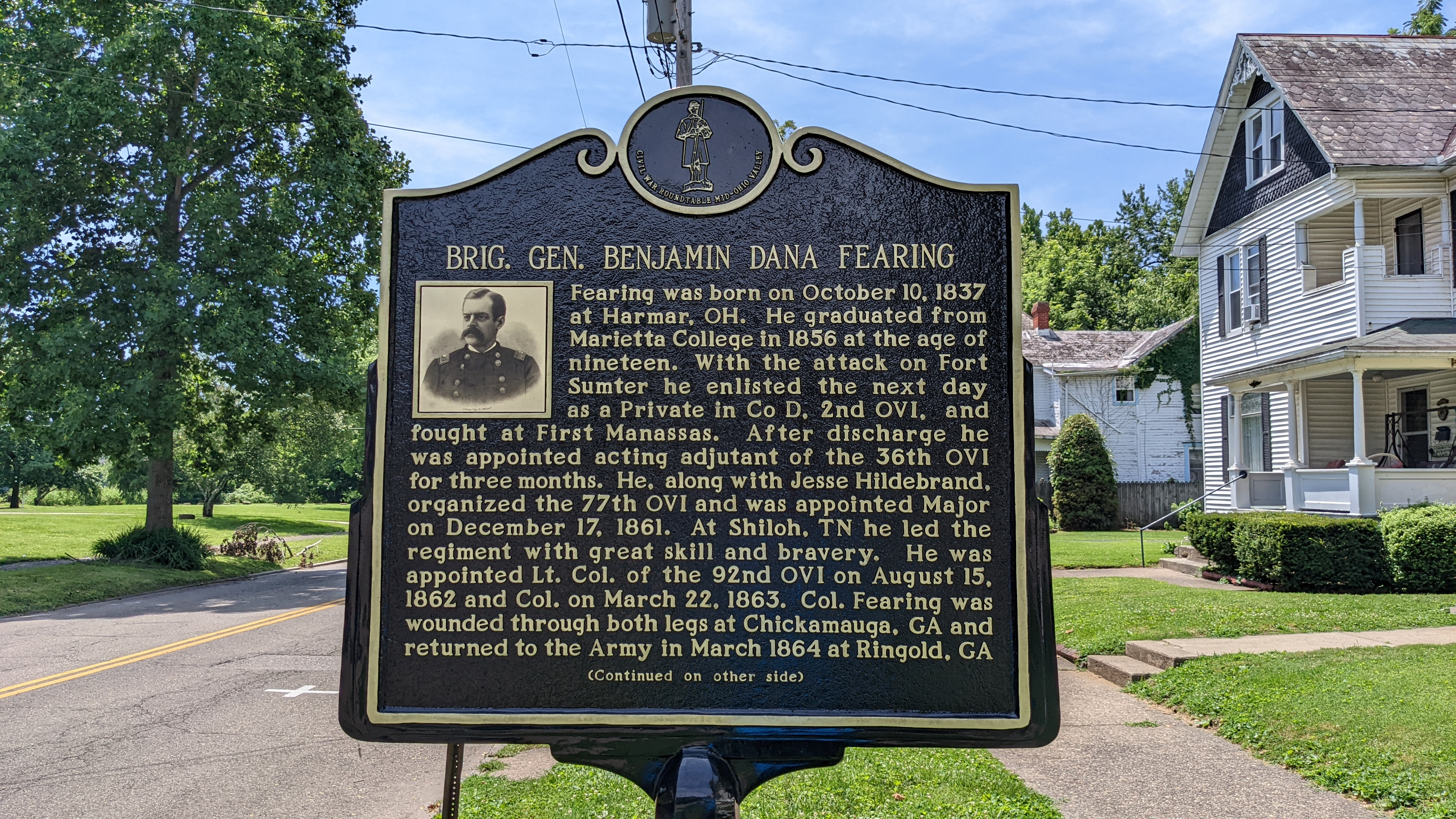
Fearing House Marker

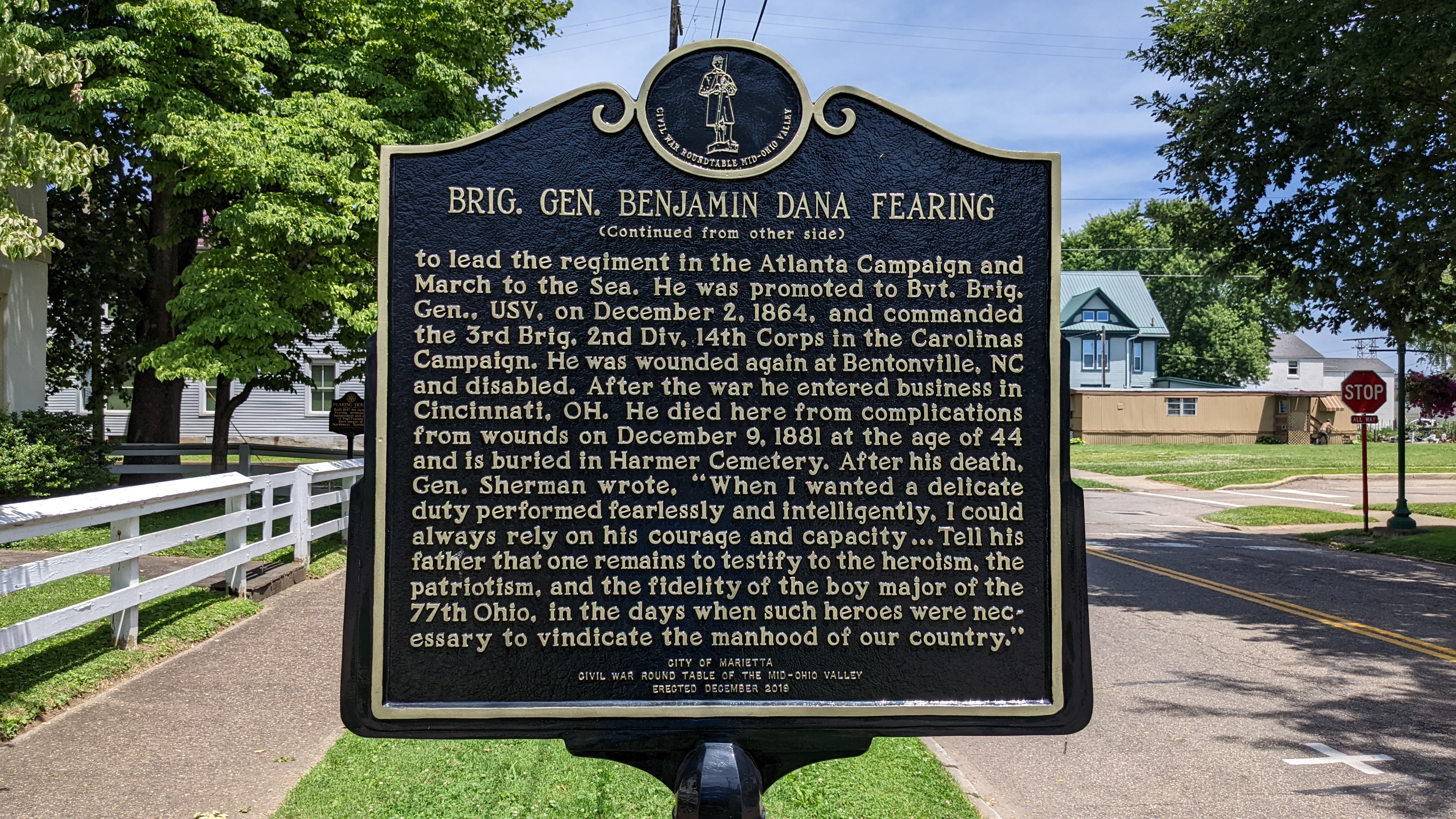
Fearing House Marker

The Fearing family home has since become a historic landmark known as the Fearing House. It features information about several patriarchs of the Fearing family and their role in Ohio's history, including Brigadier General Benjamin Fearing.

There have been efforts in the Marietta historic community to create a day dedicated to honoring the memory of Brigadier General Fearing, focusing on the day that he left military service.
