= Alexander McMillan House =

Historic house in Tennessee, United States

- U.S. National Register of Historic Places
- Location within Tennessee Location within the United States
- Nearest city: Knoxville, Tennessee
- Coordinates: 36.01127°N 83.766°W
- Area: 2.5 acres (1.0 ha)
- Built by: Alexander McMillan
- Architectural style: Side gable L-plan
- MPS: Knoxville and Knox County MPS
- NRHP reference No.: 01000504
- Added to NRHP: May 10, 2001

The Alexander McMillan House is a historic home located at 7703 Strawberry Plains Pike in Knox County, Tennessee, United States. It was constructed in 1785 by Alexander McMillan (1749–1837), an early Knox County pioneer.

Alexander McMillan arrived in Knox County in 1783 and purchased one of the original land grants that the state of North Carolina had authorized in the Land "Grab" Act of 1783, under which the state's western lands were offered for sale at a price of ten pounds for 100 acres (40 ha). He built the house in 1785. An addition was made on its front side in 1810 and a third room was added in 1860. The home was owned by his descendants until the middle of the 20th century.

The house was listed on the National Register of Historic Places in 2001.

== Alexander McMillan ==
Of Scottish descent, his family migrated to Ulster, Ireland. Alexander was born on August 12, 1749, in County Londonderry, Ireland. In 1775, he emigrated to Boston in the American colonies. He then joined the Continental Army and participated in the Battle against Quebec in 1776.

He traveled to what is now Washington County, Virginia to meet up with relatives who emigrated before him. In 1778, he married his first cousin, Martha McMillan (1762-1836), the daughter of William and Mary Leeper McMillan. William was Alexander's uncle the father of William McMillan.

He completed his service at the military with the Battle of Kings Mountain on October 7, 1780. McMillan and his wife settled in the eastern part of Tennessee.

At 63 years of age, he volunteered to serve during the War of 1812 and fought with General Andrew Jackson in the Battle of New Orleans. He lived near McMillan's Station, an East Tennessee and Virginia Railroad station 10 miles from Knoxville, Tennessee, and died in 1837. His wife Martha died in 1836. He is buried on a farm near the Old Caledonia church.
