= Paul Fearing =

American politician

Delegate to the U.S. House of Representatives from the Northwest Territory's at-large district
- In office March 4, 1801 – March 3, 1803
- Preceded by: William McMillan
- Succeeded by: Jeremiah Morrow (Representative from Ohio)

Personal details
- Born: February 28, 1762 Wareham, Massachusetts Bay, British America
- Died: August 21, 1822 (aged 60) Marietta, Ohio, U.S.
- Party: Federalist
- Relations: Benjamin D. Fearing
- Education: Harvard University (BA)
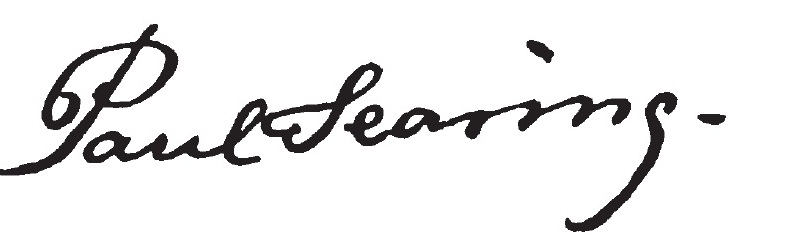
- Signature

Paul Fearing (February 28, 1762 – August 21, 1822) was an American politician who served as a delegate to the United States House of Representatives from the Northwest Territory.

== Early life and education ==
Fearing was born in Wareham, Province of Massachusetts Bay. He was prepared for college by tutors and graduated from Harvard University in 1785. He studied law in Windham, Connecticut and was admitted to the bar in 1787.

== Career ==
He moved to the Northwest Territory in May 1788 and engaged in the practice of law at Fort Harmar, now a part of Marietta, Ohio. He was the first lawyer to practice in the Northwest Territory.

Fearing was appointed the United States counsel for Washington County in 1788 and a probate judge in 1797. He was a member of the Territorial legislature from 1799 to 1801. He was elected as a Federalist a Delegate to the Seventh Congress (March 4, 1801 – March 3, 1803). He was not a candidate for renomination in 1802. He resumed the practice of law and engaged in fruit and stock raising. He was appointed associate judge of the court of common pleas in 1810 and served seven years. He was appointed master in chancery in 1814. Fearing was elected a member of the American Antiquarian Society in 1816.

== Death ==
He died at his home near Marietta, Ohio in 1822. He was buried in Harmar Cemetery, Marietta.

U.S. House of Representatives
Preceded by William McMillan	Delegate to the U.S. House of Representatives from the Northwest Territory's at-large congressional district 1801–1803	Succeeded by Jeremiah Morrow as U.S. Representative from Ohio
