= William McMillan (American politician) =

American politician (1764–1804)

Delegate to the U.S. House of Representatives from the Northwest Territory's at-large district
- In office November 24, 1800 – March 3, 1801
- Preceded by: William Henry Harrison
- Succeeded by: Paul Fearing

Personal details
- Born: March 2, 1764 near Abingdon, Virginia, British America
- Died: May 1804 (aged 39–40) Fort Washington, Ohio, U.S. (now Cincinnati)
- Resting place: Spring Grove Cemetery
- Party: Federalist
- Education: College of William and Mary (BA)

William McMillan (March 2, 1764 – May 1804) was an American lawyer, judge, county commissioner, and delegate to the 6th United States Congress from the Northwest Territory. He was among the first settlers of what would become Cincinnati, Ohio.

== Early years and education ==
He was born on March 2, 1764, near Abingdon, Washington County, Virginia, (Note: He was also said to have been born in 1760.) the second of nine children. (Note: Only one source states that he was a minister, when the sources that say that he wanted his son to be a minister do not say he was a minister.) His parents were Mary Leeper and William McMillan (died 1810), (Note: He is also said to have died in 1837.) who is of Scottish-Irish heritage and emigrated to the colonies from Ireland before 1775. He fought at the Battle of Kings Mountain during the Revolutionary War and had 200 acres on South Fork. Between 1785 and 1791, he received 900 acres in property grants and purchased 20,000 acres. The land was located in Knox County, Tennessee, from what is now Chilhowee Park to the Wooddale area, where he built a house. It still stands at 7703 Strawberry Plains Pike (called the Alexander McMillan House). He was one of the county's largest landowners. (Note: Alexander and William McMillan were both at Abingdon, Virginia. They both fought at Kings Mountain, and they both moved to Knox County, Tennessee. William, though, is consistently reported as Lawyer, Judge and Congressman William McMillan's father. William and Mary Leeper had a son-in-law named Alexander McMillian, who married their daughter Martha McMillan. She is said to have married her first cousin.)

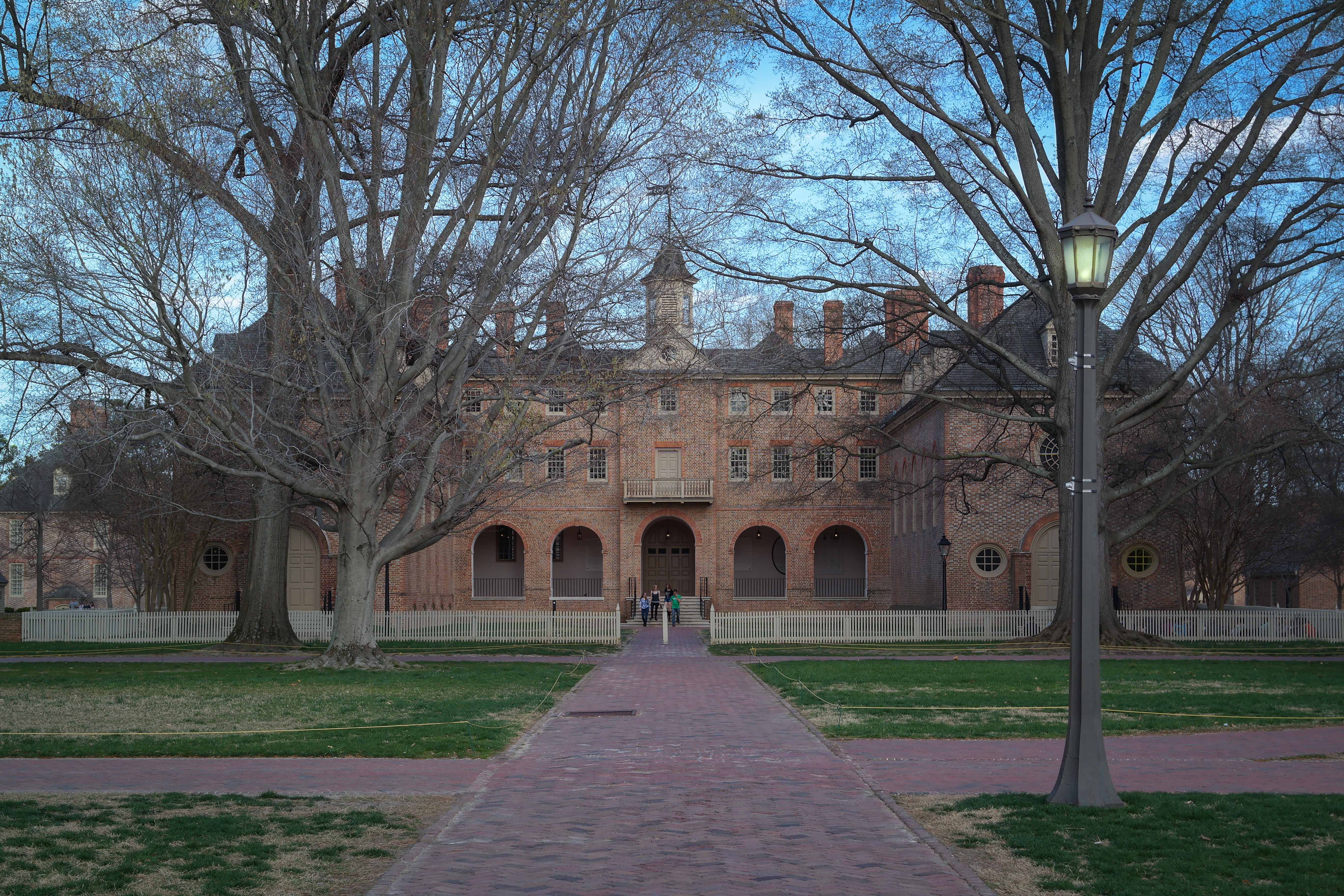
Wren Building, College of William & Mary. With a construction history dating back to 1695, it is part of the college's ancient campus.

Staunch Christians, they wanted their son to be a minister and sent him to college early in life. He studied higher philosophy and exact sciences at College of William & Mary, Williamsburg, Virginia, in 1775. The first in his class, he graduated during the Revolutionary War.

Between 1776 and 1787, McMillan worked on a farm and studied. He studied law. McMillan graduated from Mount Zion College, Winnsboro, South Carolina, in November 1787. He read about John Cleves Symmes’s Trenton Prospectus about the Northwest Territory and decided to purchase a lot between the Little and Great Miami Rivers.

== Career ==
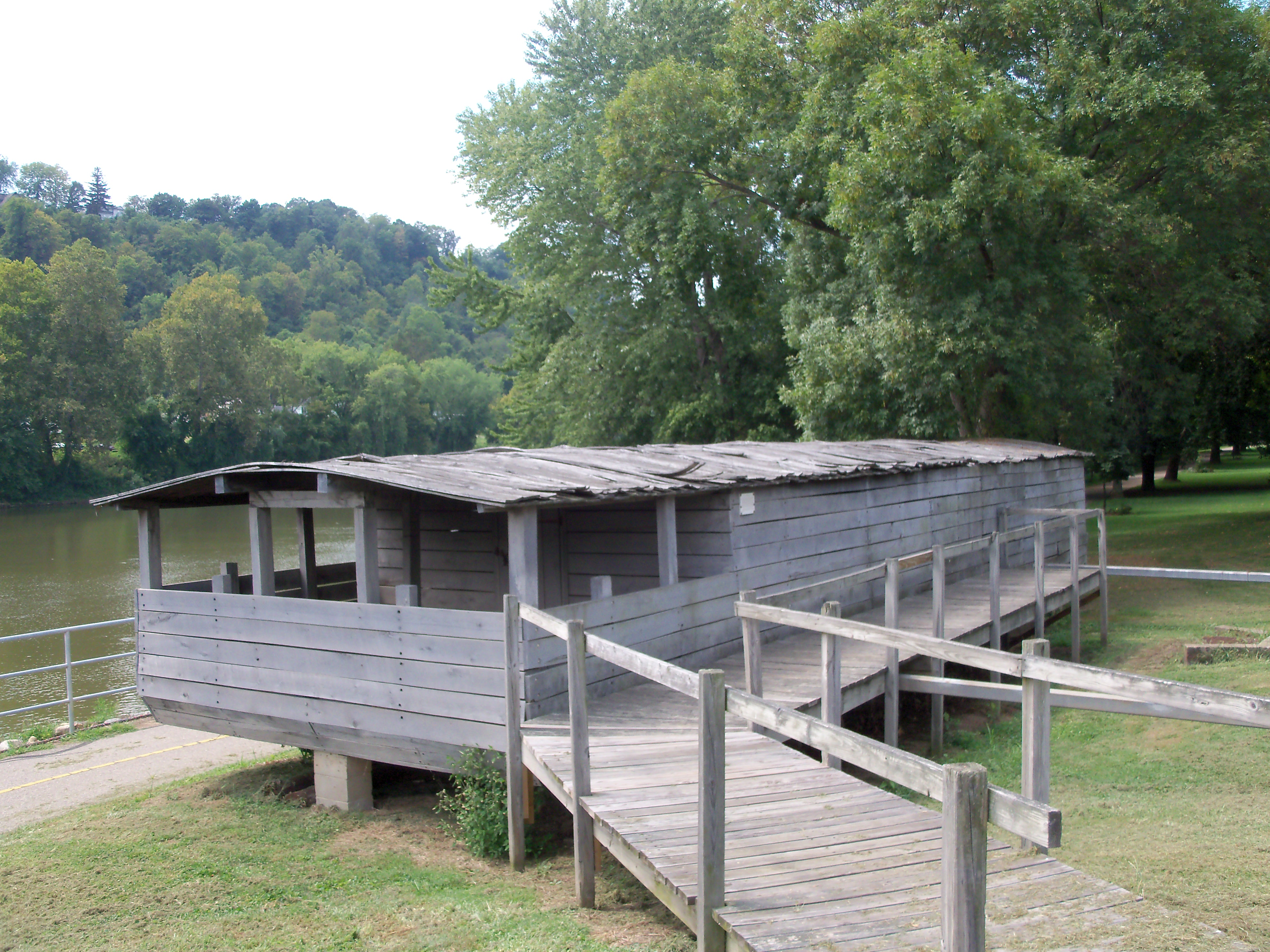
Replica of a flatboat that delivered pioneers to the three settlements: Columbia, Losantiville, and North Bend that would become Cincinnati.

He was among the Ohio River survey party of 1787 with Israel Ludlow. He was admitted to the bar in 1788. In December 1788, he was among the initial group that traveled from Limestone (now Maysville, Kentucky) to arrive at a site across from Licking River in December 1788. Originally named, Losantiville, the town was laid out by Ludlow and McMillan and other men built three or four log cabins along the Ohio River on Front Street. They hunted and fished for food. He had an assigned lot within the town by January 7, 1789. Initially, the town had no laws or codes for behavior, and behavior among the residents became unruly. McMillan was elected chairman to develop a code of by-laws and punishments for offences. John Ludlow was made sheriff and McMillan the judge. That year, McMillan received life-long injuries after four soldiers burst into his cabin on Front Street. He beat all four men from Fort Washington who were mad that McMillan had been made judge.

McMillan began to practice law in 1789. In 1790, he became the first justice of the Court of General Quarter Sessions and became a judge of the Court of Common Pleas. Most of the cases were slander, petty stealing, drunkenness, fighting, selling liquor illegally and illegally shooting guns.

He married two couples in Cincinnati in 1790. With Ludlow, Governor Arthur St. Clair, and Jonathan Dayton, he planned the town of Dayton, Ohio, in 1795. He was the County Commissioner for Hamilton County, Ohio, from 1796 to 1797.

McMillan served with Captain Robert Benham as Hamilton County Commissioners before both were elected to the Territorial House of Representatives in 1799 and 1800. He was elected to the Sixth Congress to fill the vacancy caused by the resignation of William H. Harrison He served from November 24, 1800, to March 3, 1801. He was the first delegate to represent the Northwest Territory in Congress. He declined renomination in 1800. After the admission of Ohio into the Union in 1803 he was appointed United States District Attorney for Ohio, but owing to declining health did not assume the duties. The offer, dated January 12, 1802, for the position was written by President Thomas Jefferson and was countersigned by Secretary of State James Madison.

== Personal life ==
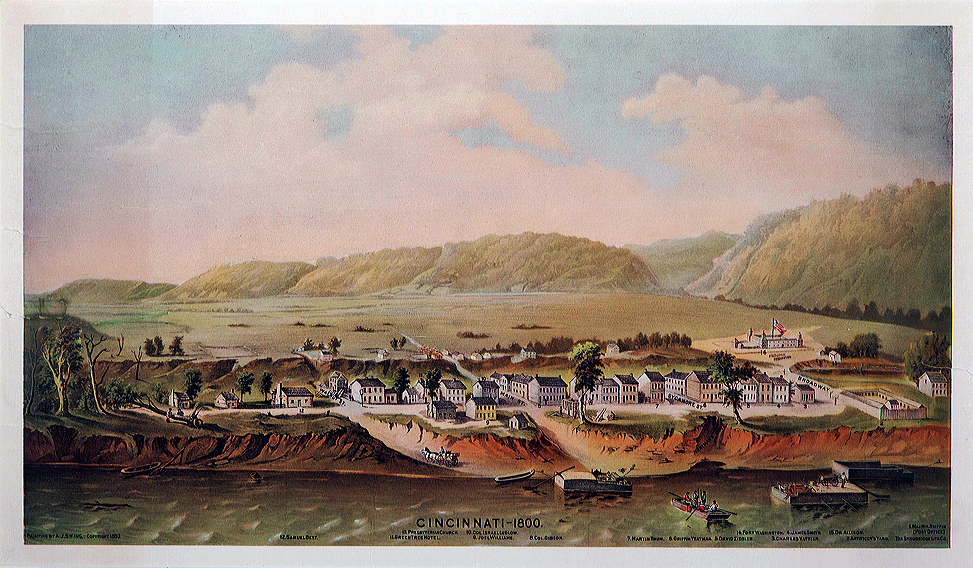
Cincinnati in 1800, lithograph, based on a painting by A.J. Swing. In 1800, there were about 30 buildings and a population of 750 people. Many of these structures and some streets are identified by number in the print.

McMillan married a woman, Constance Zenes, who was previously married. She arrived in the settlement by 1789. In 1797 he acquired 120 acres (Note: Some sources state that his property was in Avondale, but a newspaper gives specific information that show that it is in Corryville.) where he built a hewn log house. The house was located at the Corryville Triangle Park near McMillan and Auburn Streets. It was the first house built in Corryville. (Note: Corryville is named for his nephew, William Corry, who studied law under McMillan. Corry inherited the property when McMillan died and later became mayor of Cincinnati.) On April 8, 1795, McMillan joined the Nova Caesarea Harmony Lodge No. 2 of Cincinnati and was a Senior Warden of the Lodge from 1798-1789.

He died in Cincinnati, Ohio, in May 1804. He was buried first in Avondale, and 25 years later his remains were moved to Spring Grove Cemetery. In his will, McMillan left the land for the Nova Caesarea Harmony Lodge No. 2., a Masonic lodge in Ohio. A monument was installed with a plaque honoring McMillan by the Masonic Lodge.

McMillan Street in Cincinnati is named for him.

== Sources ==
- Bloom, Jo Tice. "The Congressional Delegates from the Northwest Territory." Old Northwest 3 (1977): 3-21.

U.S. House of Representatives
Preceded by William Henry Harrison	Delegate to the U.S. House of Representatives from the Northwest Territory's at-large congressional district 1800–1801	Succeeded by Paul Fearing
