= Northwest Territory's at-large congressional district =

Former administrative division in the United States

Coordinates: 41°N 86°W

- Obsolete district
- Created: 1798, as a non-voting delegate was granted by Congress
- Eliminated: 1803, as a result of statehood as Ohio
- Years active: 1798–1803

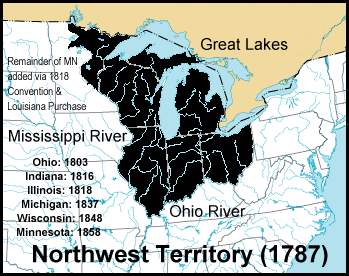

In 1798, the Northwest Territory became eligible to send a non-voting delegate to the U.S. Congress. The Assembly elected this representative.

== List of delegates representing the district ==
| Delegate | Party | Years | Cong ress | Electoral history |
|---|---|---|---|---|
| William Henry Harrison (North Bend) | None | March 4, 1799 – May 14, 1800 | 6th | Elected October 3, 1799. Resigned to become Governor of Indiana Territory. |
| Vacant | | May 14, 1800 – November 24, 1800 | 6th | |
| William McMillan (Fort Washington) | Federalist | November 24, 1800 – March 3, 1801 | 6th | Elected November 6, 1800, to finish Harrison's term. Retired. |
| Paul Fearing (Marietta) | Federalist | March 4, 1801 – March 3, 1803 | 7th | Elected November 6, 1800. District eliminated. |

The Northwest Territory was reduced to the size of Ohio when the Indiana Territory was created on July 4, 1800. The Northwest Territory went out of existence when Ohio was admitted as a state on March 1, 1803.

== See also ==
- Illinois Territory's at-large congressional district
- Indiana Territory's at-large congressional district
- Michigan Territory's at-large congressional district
- Wisconsin Territory's at-large congressional district
- Minnesota Territory's at-large congressional district
