= Putnam Street Bridge =

Putnam Bridge
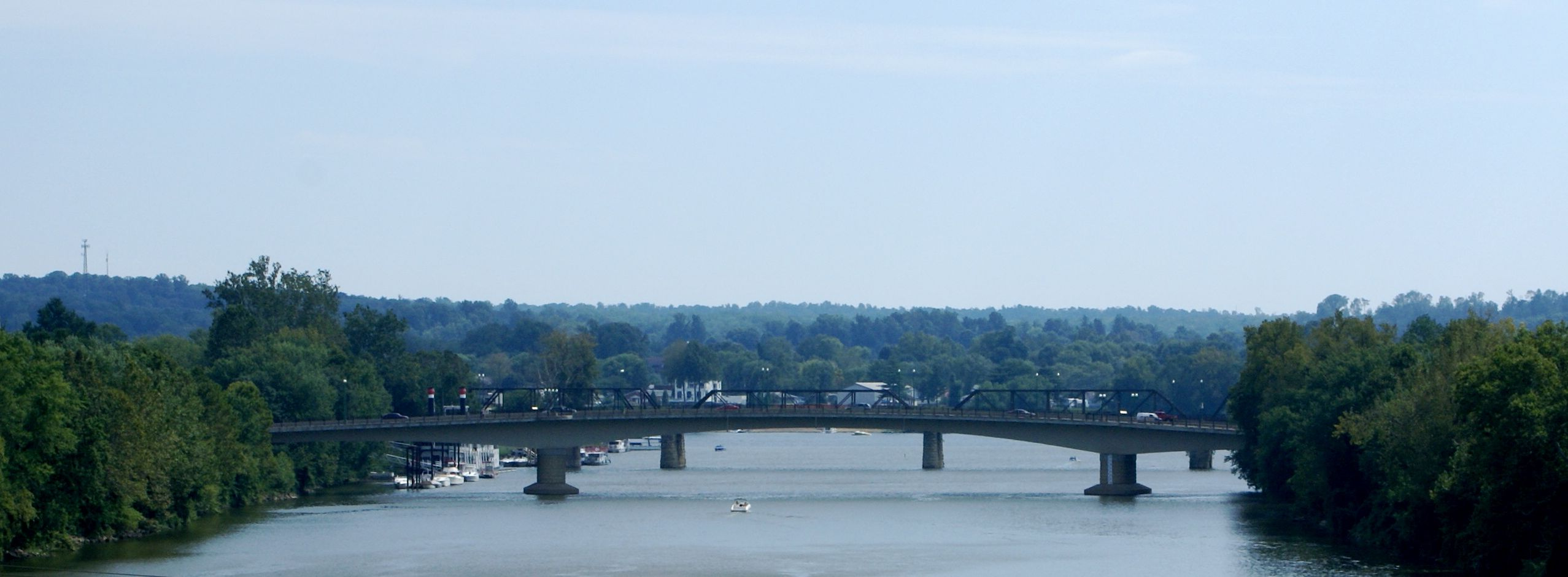
- Coordinates: 39°24′49″N 81°27′28″W
- Carries: Connects Putnam Street on the east side of the Muskingum River with Putnam Avenue on the west side
- Crosses: Muskingum River
- Locale: Marietta, Ohio
- Maintained by: Washington County, Ohio
- Heritage status: 1913: NRHP District contributing structure
- ID number: 1913: 8438536; 1999: 8430128

Characteristics
- Material: 1913: Steel; 1999: Concrete (continuous)
- Total length: 1913: 237.7 metres (780 ft); 1999: 209.1 metres (686 ft)
- Width: 1913: 10.9 metres (36 ft); 1999: 15.6 metres (51 ft)
- Piers in water: 1880: 7; 1913: 4; 1999: 2
- Load limit: 1913: 6.3 metric tons (6.9 short tons); 1999: 40.5 metric tons (44.6 short tons)
- Clearance above: 1913: 4.88 metres (16.0 ft)
- Clearance below: 1913: 10.4 metres (34 ft); 1999: 10.7 metres (35 ft)

History
- Opened: 1880

Statistics
- Daily traffic: 1979: 12,000; 1999: 17,150

The Putnam Bridge, also known as the Marietta Bridge and the Marietta Street Bridge, is a historic United States river crossing that connects Marietta, Ohio, with its Fort Harmar district. The original 1880 bridge was the first free crossing of the Muskingum River. The 1913 bridge was a contributing structure to the Harmar Historic District. The bridge crosses the Muskingum, just above its confluence with the Ohio River.

== History ==
The original bridge was constructed in 1880. It had two swing spans as the lock of a nearby dam was in the process of being moved from the west to east side. That bridge was wrecked by the 1884 flood. A second bridge was built on the same piers, also with two swing spans. An increase in traffic necessitated a new bridge in 1900, which was built on 4 new stone piers with a single swing section. That bridge was swept away in the Ohio flood of 1913.

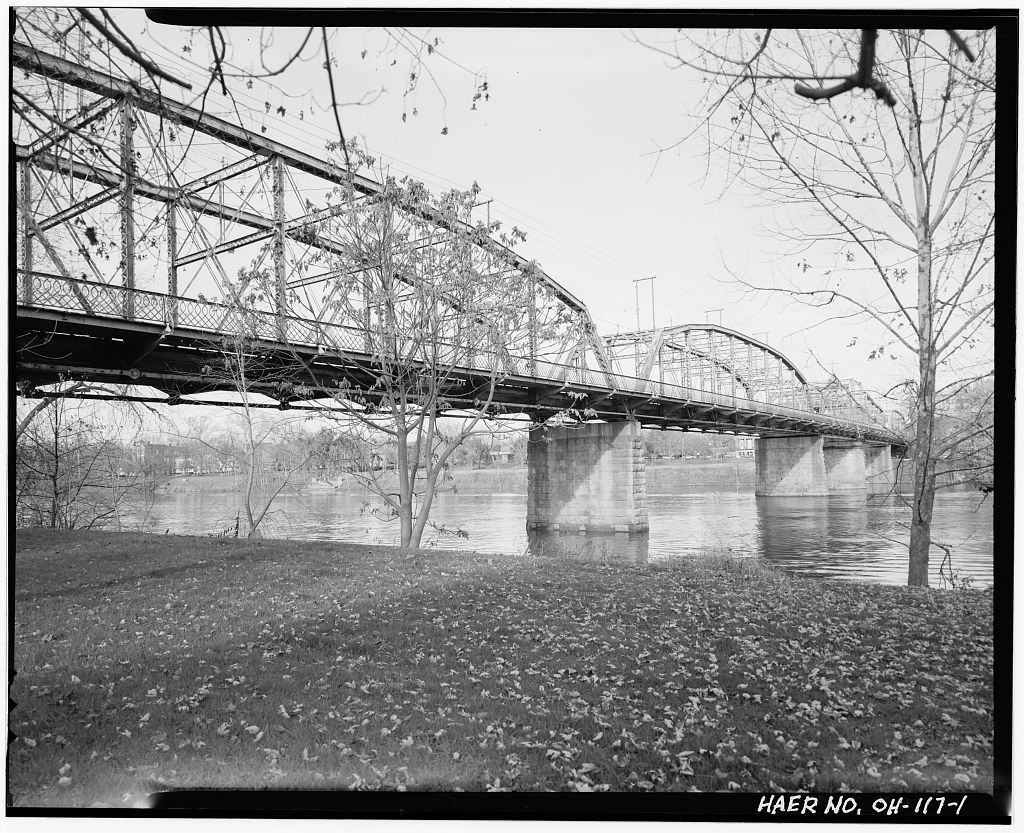
The 1913 bridge in 1996

In 1913-4 a new bridge was built on the same piers and abutments, but was raised up 4 feet (1.2 m) to reduce the risk of further flood damage. The bridge was built by the Nelson-Merydith Company of Marietta. In 1951, the timber deck was replaced by concrete. In 1972 the timber sidewalks were replaced and repairs were made to the structure. In 1993 structural reinforcements were added. On 27 April 2000, this span was demolished using 400 linear shaped charges.

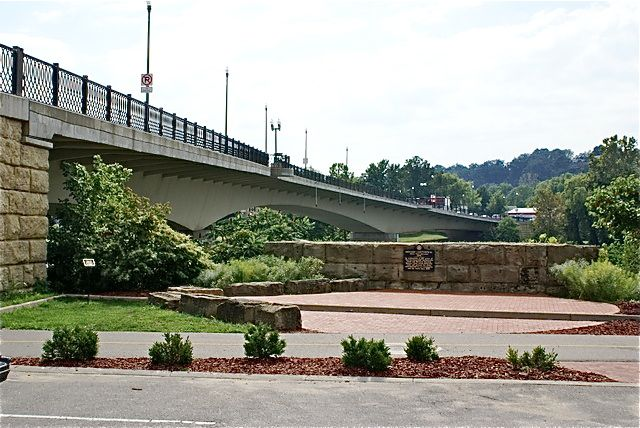
1999 Putnam Street Bridge. 1900 bridge pier in foreground

In 1999 a new bridge was constructed just down stream of the 1880 crossing. The new bridge is the first in Ohio to use the cast-in-place reinforced concrete box with the balanced cantilever method of construction. The new bridge, while of a new design, incorporates architectural details of the older bridge. The new bridge cost US$11.4 million.

=== Significance ===
The bridge connects the Harmar and Marietta Historic Districts and the 1913 bridge was a contributing structure of the former. The bridge was the primary crossing of the Muskingum until 1953, when the Washington Street Bridge opened.

== See also ==
- List of bridges documented by the Historic American Engineering Record in Ohio
