= 86th Illinois Infantry Regiment =

86th Regiment Illinois Volunteer Infantry
- Illinois flag
- Active: August 27, 1862, to June 21, 1865
- Country: United States
- Allegiance: Union
- Branch: Infantry
- Engagements: Battle of Perryville; Battle of Stone's River; Battle of Chickamauga; Siege of Chattanooga; Battle of Lookout Mountain; Battle of Missionary Ridge; Battle of Resaca; Battle of Kennesaw Mountain; Siege of Atlanta; Battle of Jonesboro; Battle of Bentonville

The 86th Regiment Illinois Volunteer Infantry was an infantry regiment that served in the Union Army during the American Civil War.

== Service ==
The 86th Illinois Infantry was organized at Peoria, Illinois and mustered into Federal service on August 27, 1862.

The regiment was mustered out on June 6, 1865, and discharged at Chicago, Illinois, on June 21, 1865.

== Total strength and casualties ==
The regiment suffered 3 officers and 73 enlisted men who were killed in action or who died of their wounds and 1 officers and 93 enlisted men who died of disease, for a total of 175 fatalities.

== Commanders ==
- Colonel David D. Irons - Died Nashville, Tennessee August 11, 1863.
- Lieutenant Colonel Allen L. Fahnestock - Mustered out with the regiment.

== See also ==
- List of Illinois Civil War Units
- Illinois in the American Civil War
