= Harmar, Marietta =

- Harmar Historic District and Boundary Increase
- U.S. National Register of Historic Places
- U.S. Historic district
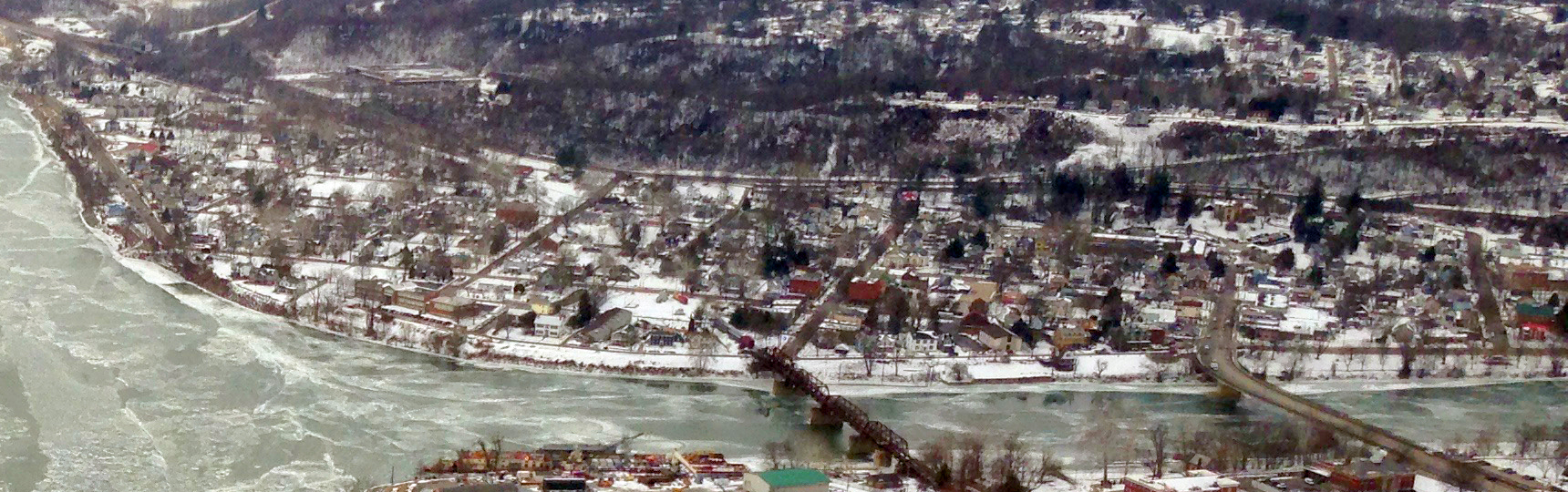
- Aerial view, looking west

- Location within Ohio Location within the United States
- Location: Roughly bounded by the Ohio and Muskingum Rivers and the rear property lines of Lancaster, George, and Franklin Sts.; also roughly bounded by Lancaster, Harmar, Putnam and Franklin Sts. and the Ohio River, Fort Harmar Dr., and the Muskingum River, Marietta, Ohio
- Coordinates: 39°24′30″N 81°27′30″W
- Area: 60 acres (24 ha); 147.5 acres (59.7 ha)
- Built: 1785
- Architectural style: Federal, Greek Revival, Gothic Revival, Late Victorian
- NRHP reference No.: 74001645; 93000987
- Added to NRHP: December 19, 1974; September 16, 1993

Harmar is a historic neighborhood in the city of Marietta, Ohio, United States. Located at the western side of the confluence of the Muskingum and Ohio Rivers, it grew up around the early Fort Harmar in the 1780s, being settled in conjunction with Marietta. After a period of forming part of Marietta, it existed separately beginning in 1837 before rejoining the mother city in 1890. Connected by bridge to the rest of the city, it retains much of its nineteenth-century architecture and landscape, and most of the neighborhood is now a historic district on the National Register of Historic Places.

== History ==
The first pioneers of Marietta landed in April 1788, beginning by building cabins and planting crops along the river. They generally lived on the eastern side of the Muskingum, across from Fort Harmar, but their farms were close enough to the fort that garrison troops routinely watched their farming activities, and their ventures across the river were not always peaceful, as pioneer Robert Warth was murdered by Indians just west of the fort on the flat land that later became occupied by the neighborhood. Until 1800, neither side of the river had an official legal status, but an act of the Northwest Territory legislature incorporated the settled areas of both sides as the town of Marietta, effective January 1, 1801. Decades later, disagreements with city leaders prompted Harmar residents to request separation from the rest of the city, and on January 5, 1837, the General Assembly passed an act incorporating Point Harmar separately from Marietta, which itself was reincorporated by an act of March 13, 1837. Believing the bill's provisions to be in accord with the desires of the residents, a legislative committee found itself to have been deceived after residents resolved almost unanimously to reject many of the provisions, and five days after Marietta's incorporation bill passed, the first act was repealed and replaced by a new act drafted to reflect the resolution of Harmar's electorate. This status continued until 1890, when the two municipalities were re-merged. The same year marked the end of Harmar's own legal school district, separate from the districts of Marietta and Marietta Township, which had been formed in 1866.

On January 9, 1970, the neighborhood was the site of fire at the Harmar House Center nursing home, which ultimately killed 32 of the 46 residents.

== Landscape ==
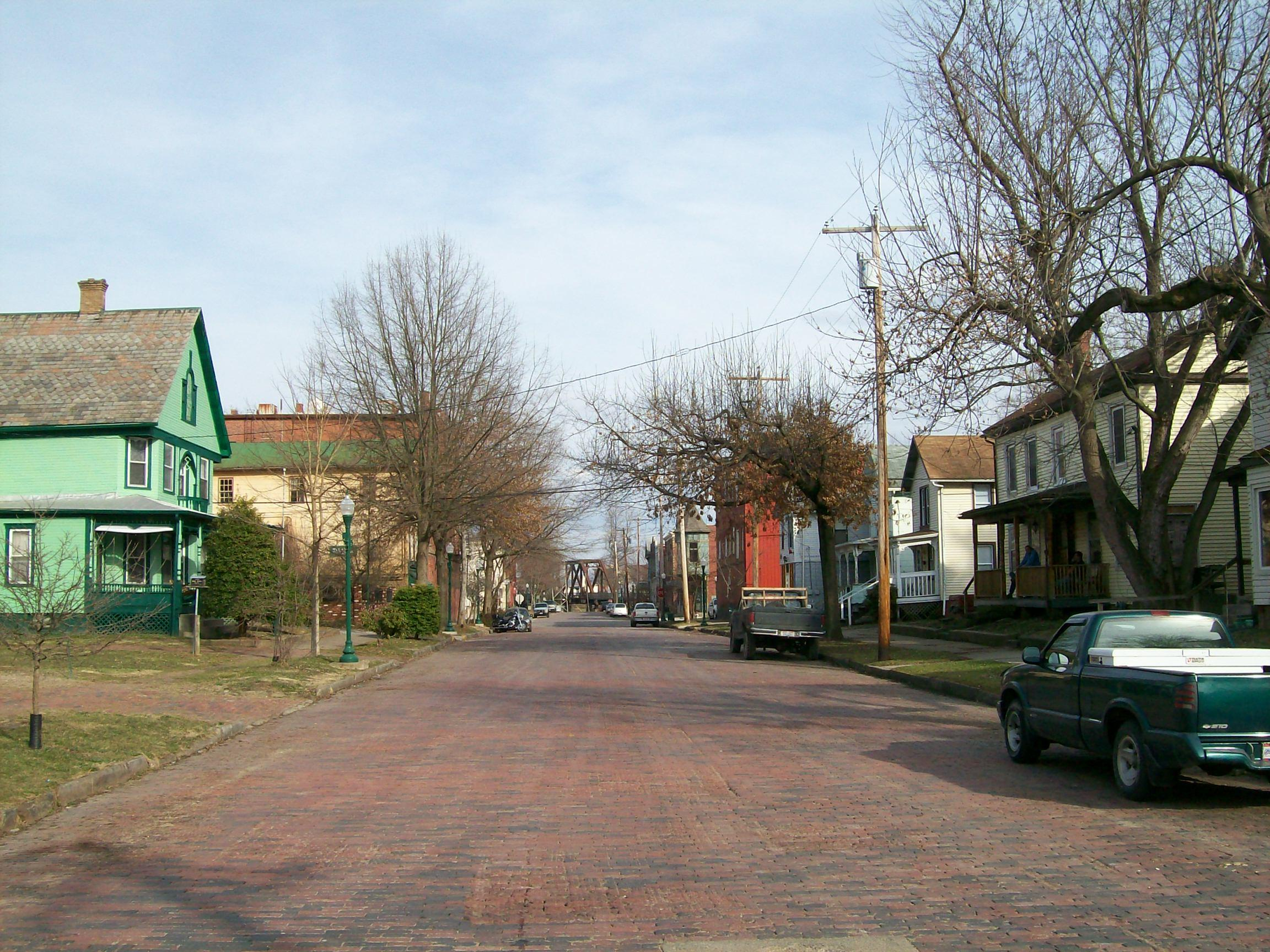
Scene on Maple Street

Architecturally, Harmar is a good example of Ohio communities planned in the nineteenth century. Its grid plan begins at Fort Harmar and proceeds along both rivers away from their confluence, with the wide tree-lined streets being oriented north-south and east-west rather than paralleling the rivers. Houses in the neighborhood include examples of various nineteenth-century architectural styles; the Federal, Greek Revival, and Gothic Revival styles are most significant, and the Colonial Revival and Italianate styles are also common. Since 1880, Harmar has been connected by bridge to Putnam Street in Marietta proper; the first bridge was destroyed in the Great Flood of 1913 and a swing bridge constructed in its place, although the bridge has since been replaced by a newer span that opened in September 2000. State Route 7 formerly traversed the neighborhood, although the opening of the nearby Washington Street Bridge facilitated its rerouting away from the Putnam Street Bridge.

== Historic district ==
In 1974, 60 acres (24 ha) of Harmar was designated the Harmar Historic District and listed on the National Register of Historic Places. Forty-two buildings, plus the fort site and one object, were included in the district as contributing properties. In 1993, the district was expanded by the addition of more than two hundred contributing properties over an area of approximately 150 acres (61 ha); the original district protected areas closer to the fort, while the later designation expanded the district to the base of the bluff at the far edges of the neighborhood. Not all of the contributing properties are still in existence, as the destroyed Putnam Street Bridge was included in the district, but the replacement span was designed to be compatible with the architecture of Harmar to the west and the larger Marietta Historic District at its eastern end.
