= Washington meridian (Mississippi) =

US survey line

Coordinates: 30°59′56″N 91°09′36″W

The Washington Meridian is one of the 38 principal meridians governing cadastral surveys in the United States. The meridian line was surveyed and established in 1803 by surveyor Isaac Briggs. Briggs named the meridian the Washington Meridian, likely because the meridian passed near his offices in the community of Washington, Mississippi.

The Washington Meridian runs north on a longitude of 91°09′36″W from the base line, which is the Mississippi–Louisiana border at latitude 31° north. The Washington Meridian is the basis of cadastral surveys in southwestern Mississippi, south of the Choctaw Meridian base line and west of the territory of the Saint Stephens Meridian. The Washington Meridian shares the same initial point as the Saint Helena Meridian, which runs south from that initial point. The Saint Helena Meridian is the basis for surveys in Louisiana east of the Mississippi River.

== See also ==
- List of principal and guide meridians and base lines of the United States
- Public Land Survey System

== Sources ==
- White, C. Albert (1991). A history of the rectangular survey system (PDF). OCLC 987270720.
