= Tallahassee meridian =

US survey line

Coordinates: 30°26′04.12″N 84°16′38.00″W

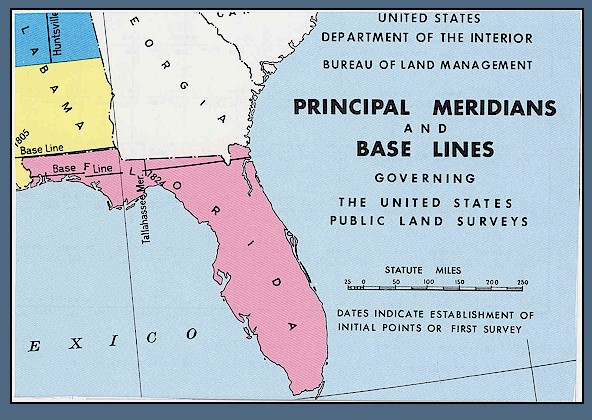
U.S. Bureau of Land Management map showing the principal meridian in Florida

The Tallahassee meridian, in longitude 84° 16′ 37.59″ west from the prime meridian at Greenwich, runs north and south from the initial point on the base line at Tallahassee, in latitude 30° 26′ 04.12″ north, and as a principal meridian governs the surveys in Florida and Alabama as part of the Public Land Survey System.

The "Tallahassee meridian" survey monument (see survey marker) is located at the intersection of these lines of longitude and latitude (the longitude line being the "Tallahassee meridian" and the latitude line being the "Tallahassee Parallel" or "Tallahassee Base Line"). This survey monument serves as the initial point for U.S. government surveys in the state of Florida. The 6 mile × 6 mile townships originate from here and are numbered by township (see survey township) depending upon whether they are north or south of this point, and are numbered by "range" depending upon whether they are east or west of this point. Thus, Township 3 South Range 26 East would extend from approximately 12 to 18 miles South of the monument, and would be positioned from approximately 150 to 156 miles East of the monument. Each township/range is then divided into 36 sections of 1 mile by 1 mile each.

This survey monument can be found in Cascades Park near the amphitheater. The monument originally marked the southwest corner of a section of land given in gratitude by the United States to Marquis de la Fayette (see Lafayette Land Grant) — his lands being part of Township 1 North Range 1 East. Photographs of the marker are published by the Principal Meridian Project.

== See also ==
- List of principal and guide meridians and base lines of the United States
