= Sixth principal meridian =

US survey line

Point of Beginning Marker for the 6th Principal Meridian at Kansas/Nebraska border

6th Principal Meridian Monument

The Sixth principal meridian at 97°22′08″W extends from the baseline coincident with the north boundary of Kansas in latitude 40°N south through the state to its south boundary in latitude 37°N and north through Nebraska to the Missouri River and governs the surveys in Kansas and Nebraska; the surveys in Wyoming except those referred to the Wind River meridian and base line, which intersect in latitude 43°01′20″N and longitude 108°48′40″W from Greenwich; the surveys in Colorado except those projected from the New Mexico and Ute meridians the latter intersecting its baseline in latitude 39°06′40″N and longitude 108°33′20″W from Greenwich; and the surveys in South Dakota extended or to be extended over the tract embracing the Pine Ridge and Rosebud Indian Reservations.

== See also ==
- List of principal and guide meridians and base lines of the United States
