= Humboldt meridian =

US survey line

Coordinates: 40°25′02.06″N 124°07′14.12″W

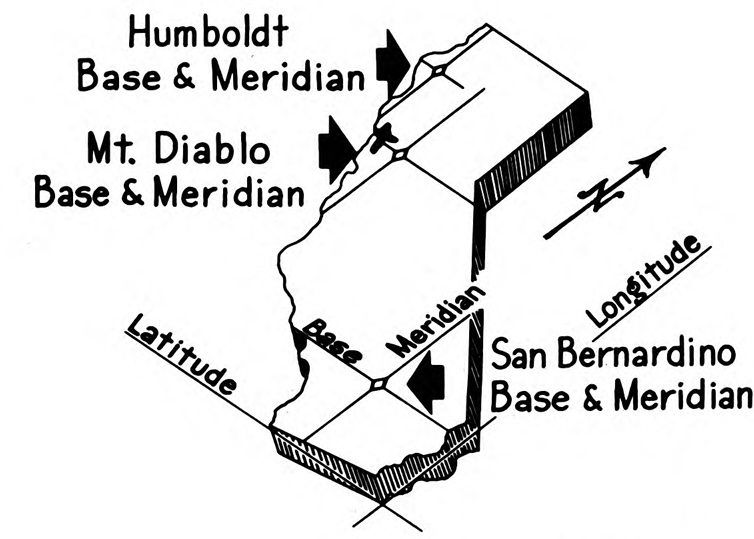
Meridians and baselines of California: Humboldt, Mt. Diablo, and San Bernardino

The Humboldt meridian in California, longitude 124° 07' 10" west from Greenwich, intersects the base line on the summit of Mount Pierce at latitude 40° 25' 02" north (co-ordinates in NAD27 datum), and governs the surveys in the northwestern corner of California, lying west of the Coast Range of mountains, and north of township 5 south, of the Humboldt meridian system. This principal meridian was established in 1853.

== See also ==
- List of principal and guide meridians and base lines of the United States
