= Fourth principal meridian =

US survey line

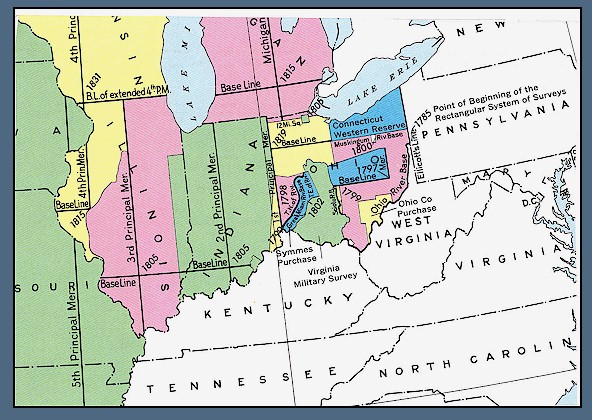
U.S. Bureau of Land Management map showing the principal meridians of Ohio, Indiana, and Illinois

The fourth principal meridian, set in 1815, is the principal meridian for land surveys in northwestern Illinois and west-central Illinois, and its 1831 extension is the principal meridian for land surveys in Wisconsin and northeastern Minnesota. It is part of the Public Land Survey System that covers most of the United States.

The fourth principal meridian begins at a point on the west bank of the Illinois River in Schuyler County, Illinois. The fourth principal meridian's baseline, sometimes called the Beardstown baseline, runs west from this initial point. The meridian and this baseline governs surveys in Illinois that are west of both the Illinois River and the third principal meridian.

The Illinois Department of Transportation 2003 Survey Manual gives the point as 40°0′50″N 90°27′11″W and notes that the meridian is an extension of the line north from the mouth of the Illinois River near Grafton, Illinois.

== Extended ==
The meridian was extended north in 1831, through Wisconsin and northeastern Minnesota. The extension uses the Illinois–Wisconsin border as its baseline, and is the basis of surveys in all of Wisconsin, as well as that part of Minnesota:

- east of the Mississippi River, and
- some land west of the Mississippi River that includes the northern parts of Dakota and Scott Counties, and eastern Hennepin County, including all of Richfield, that part of Minneapolis south of 44th Ave. N., and the eastern half of the city of Bloomington, and
- all land east of the "third guide meridian, west of the fifth principal meridian," that is north of the Mississippi River from a point near the city of Aitkin. This line follows the western boundary of Aitkin County, then goes through the center of Itasca and Koochiching Counties. This includes a portion of land west of the Mississippi River in Aitkin and Itasca Counties.

The initial point of the extended fourth principal meridian is located at 42°30′27″N 90°25′37″W.

== See also ==
- List of principal and guide meridians and base lines of the United States
- Public Land Survey System – United States survey system that established the meridians
- Second principal meridian – used in eastern Illinois
- Third principal meridian – used for most of central Illinois
