= Boise meridian =

US survey line

Coordinates: 43°22′19.25″N 116°23′38.65″W

The Boise meridian is one of the 35 principal meridians of the Public Land Survey System of the United States. Adopted in 1867, its longitude is 116° 23′ 35″ (or 116° 24′ 15″) west from Greenwich and its principal baseline is latitude 43° 22′ 21″ north. The meridian and baseline intersect approximately 19 miles (31 km) from Boise, between the Snake River and the Boise River. The Boise meridian governs land surveys in the state of Idaho.

The city of Meridian, Idaho lies directly on the meridian and is a namesake of the meridian.

== See also ==
- List of principal and guide meridians and base lines of the United States
