= Willamette Stone =

Historic surveying marker in Oregon, US

Coordinates: 45°31′10.23551″N 122°44′37.89866″W

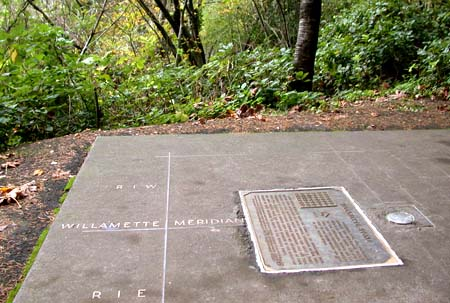
The Willamette Stone's location is now commemorated by a circular marker and plaque.

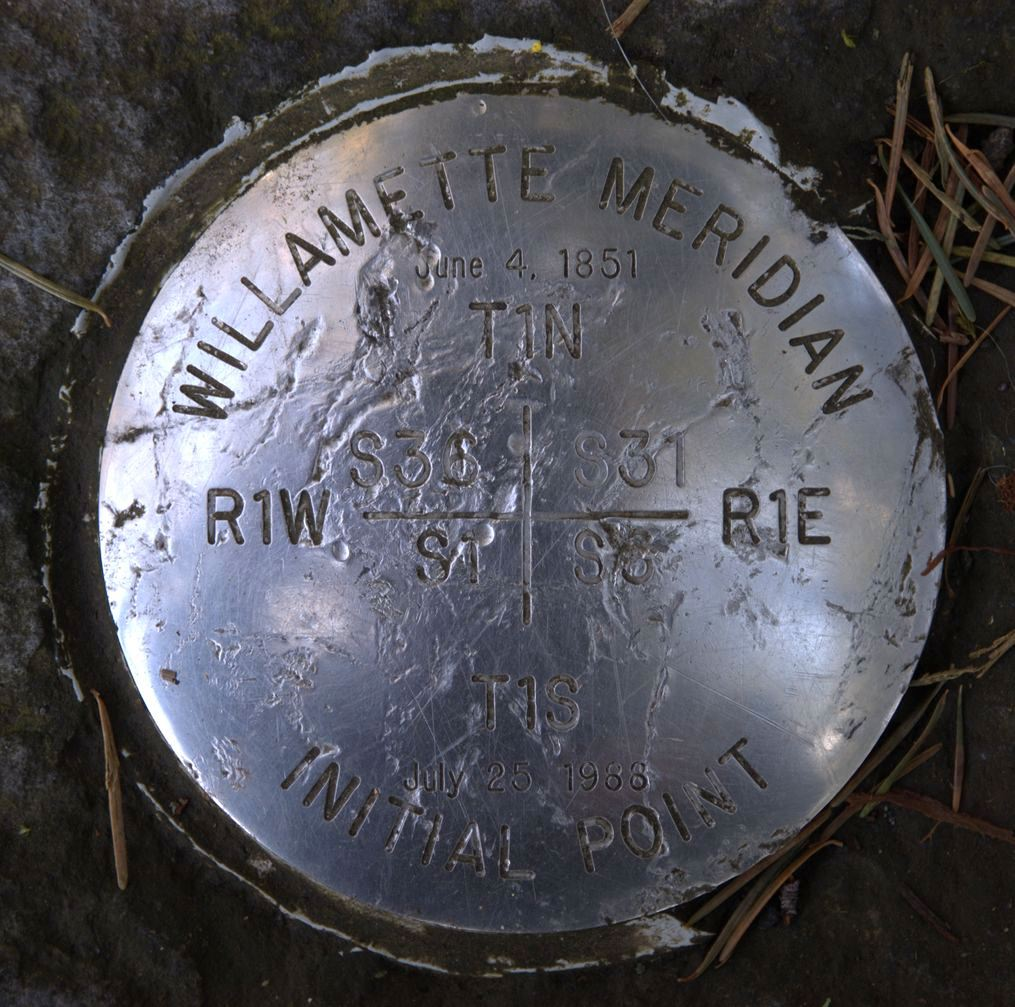
Close-up of the current marker

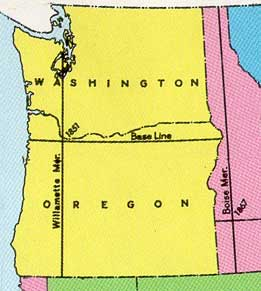
The Willamette Stone is located where the meridian and baseline intersect on this BLM map.

The Willamette Stone was a small stone obelisk originally installed by the Department of Interior in 1885 in the western hills of Portland, Oregon, in the United States to mark the intersection and origin of the Willamette meridian and Willamette baseline. It replaced a cedar stake placed by the Surveyor General of the Oregon Territory in 1851; this stake defined the grid system of sections and townships from which all real property in the states of Oregon and Washington has been measured following the Donation Land Claim Act of 1850. The Willamette meridian runs north–south, and the Willamette baseline runs east–west through the marker. The easternmost northeast corner of Washington County is sited on the marker.

== History ==
The location of the obelisk is now indicated by a stainless steel marker in Willamette Stone State Heritage Site, an Oregon state park approximately four miles (6.4 km) west of downtown Portland. The site is near Skyline Boulevard, in the West Hills overlooking the Tualatin Valley and the Willamette River watershed.

The grid defined by the stone extended the Public Land Survey System and was used as the basis of land claims in the Oregon Territory. The first marker, a red cedar stake, was placed on the site on June 4, 1851, by John B. Preston, the first Surveyor General of the Oregon Territory. Preston was appointed by President Millard Fillmore to create a system for surveying land in the territory; he lost his position in 1853, and "drifted into obscurity." The location was chosen such that the baseline would not cross the Columbia River and the meridian would lie west of Vancouver Lake. The meridian and baseline were surveyed using solar compasses by James E. Freeman of Wisconsin and William Ives of Michigan. Ives surveyed the baseline in both directions and the meridian to the north; Freeman surveyed the meridian to the south. The grid system was an extension of the system used in the Northwest Territory proposed by Thomas Jefferson. The Willamette Stone marked the location of the first townships and ranges north and south of the marker.

The Department of Interior replaced the stake with a stone obelisk on July 25, 1885. On two sides, the stone was marked with the words "BASE" and "LINE", while on the other two sides it was marked with the words "WILL." and "MER." As the stone was vandalized in the 1980s, the federal government replaced it with the current marker. An accompanying bronze plaque was also placed by the State of Oregon which read:

Beginning here, the Willamette meridian was established running north to the Canadian Border and south to the California border, and the baseline was established running east to the Idaho border and west to the Pacific Ocean.

As part of the replacement project, the park was also improved which included adding signage, information boards, and improving the trail and parking areas. The park was re-dedicated by Governor Vic Atiyeh in 1988.

== Streets ==
The location of the Willamette meridian and Willamette baseline can be identified by various streets that follow or parallel their courses, often named to call attention to this fact.

=== North–South streets and the meridian ===
Streets named because they follow the meridian

- In Clackamas County, SW Stafford Road and Meridian Road follow the meridian.
- In Marion County several sections of Meridian Road follow the meridian, but hilly terrain forces many deviations.
- In Linn County, portions of Meridian Heights Loop, north of Sweet Home follow the meridian.
- In Jackson County, Meridian Road follows several miles of the meridian.
- In Thurston County, Washington, east of Lacey, three sections of Meridian Road follow the meridian, totaling about three miles (5 km).
- In Kitsap County, Washington, west of Silverdale near Apex Airport, Willamette Meridian Road NW follows the meridian for about three miles (5 km).

Other streets that follow the meridian

- In Multnomah County, SW 65th Avenue and a short section of Interstate 5 immediately south of the Barbur Blvd. interchange overlay the meridian.
- In Clark County, Washington, north of Ridgefield, NW 71st Avenue follows the meridian for about two miles.
- In Lewis County, Washington, east of Toledo, Templeton and Schmidt roads follow the meridian for the mile adjacent to SR 505. South of US Highway 12 at Ethel, Tucker and Classe Roads follow the meridian for about 3 miles.
- In Pierce County, Washington, on the Key Peninsula, 150th Avenue S follows the meridian its entire 1 1/2-mile (2.4 km) length.
- In Thurston County, Washington, east of Lacey, Tucker Road SE (no relation to the Tucker Road in Lewis County) follows the meridian for about 3/4 mile (1.2 km).
- In Kitsap County, Washington, near the western border of Naval Submarine Base Bangor, parts of Lester Road NW, Grampus Road, and Snook Road follow the meridian for a total of about two miles.
- In Whatcom County, Washington, near Birch Bay, Jackson Road (south of the bay) and Harborview Road (north of the bay) both follow the meridian, for a total of about five miles.
- In Jefferson County, Washington, near Hadlock, Cleveland Street, south of Port Townsend Bay, follows the meridian for about 3 blocks.

Streets named because they parallel the meridian

- In Whatcom County, Washington, Guide Meridian Road (State Route 539) is named after the Guide Meridian between R2E and R3E, 12 miles (19 km) east of the Willamette meridian.
- In Newberg, Meridian Street is several miles west of the Willamette meridian.

=== East–West streets and the baseline ===
Streets named because they follow the baseline

- Baseline Road in Tillamook, Washington, Hood River, Gilliam, and Morrow counties all follow or start at the Willamette baseline.

Other streets that follow the baseline

- Stark Street in east Portland (formerly Base Line Road) and Washington County follows the Willamette baseline.

Streets named because they parallel the baseline

- Division Street in Portland (formerly Section Line Road) follows the division between the first and second rows of square-mile sections south of the Willamette baseline.

== See also ==
- List of principal and guide meridians and base lines of the United States
