= Saint Helena meridian =

US survey line

Coordinates: 30°59′56″N 91°09′36″W

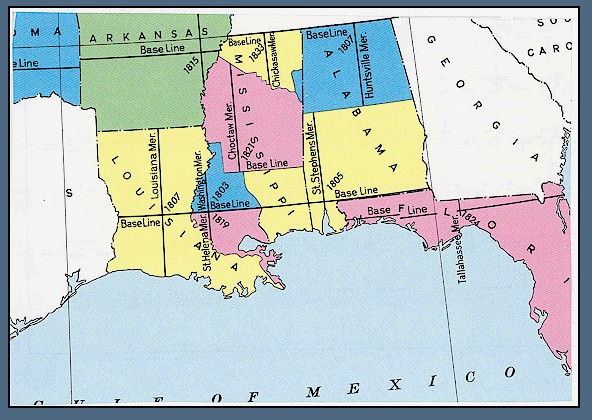
U.S. Bureau of Land Management map showing the principal meridians in Louisiana, Mississippi, and Alabama

Saint Helena meridian (French: méridian de Sainte-Hélène) begins at the initial point of the Washington meridian, in latitude 31° north, and longitude 91° 09′ 15″ west of Greenwich, passing one mile east of Baton Rouge, extends south to the Mississippi River, and governs the surveys in the Greensburg and southeastern districts of Louisiana, east of the Mississippi River.

The Saint Helena meridian has a common initial point with the Washington meridian, which runs north from the initial point and governs cadastral surveys in southwestern Mississippi.

The Saint Helena meridian is located along the east line of Township 1 South, Range 1 West as the Townships and Ranges are numbered East of the Mississippi River. The meridian is found along the Louisiana baseline from its point of intersection with the Mississippi River traversing eastward to the fifth township's east line.

The Saint Helena meridian is in East Feliciana Parish.

The Saint Helena meridian is not found in the adjoining Saint Helena Parish from which it takes its name.

== Sources ==
- Raymond, William Galt (1914). Plane Surveying for Use in the Classroom and Field (via Internet Archive). New York: American Book Company.

== See also ==
- List of principal and guide meridians and base lines of the United States
