= Mount Pierce =

Mount Pierce may refer to:

- Mount Pierce (California)
- Mount Pierce (New Hampshire)
- Pierce Mountain (Washington)
- Pierce Peak (Antarctica), named after psychiatrist Chester Middlebrook Pierce
- Pierce Peak (New Mexico), the highest peak in the Alamo Hueco Mountains
