= Navajo meridian and baseline =

US survey line

The Navajo meridian, established in 1869, is one of the two principal meridians for Arizona, the other being the Gila and Salt River meridian. Its initial point was stated as latitude 35° 45' north, longitude 108° 32' 45" west from Greenwich, but has been revised as 35°44′56″N 108°31′59″W The Navajo meridian and baseline were used to set townships and ranges in a special survey for the original Navajo Reservation, and was set at the eastern boundary of that reservation. The Arizona lands surveyed using the Navajo meridian and baseline were ranges six west to ten west and townships one north to fourteen north, and included Canyon de Chelly National Monument.

While the above-mentioned Arizona lands still reference the Navajo meridian and baseline, in New Mexico the surveys of lands originally surveyed under it were canceled in 1936, and have since been resurveyed using the New Mexico meridian and baseline. In Arizona, only the portions of the Navajo Reservation that are east of the Hopi Reservation were surveyed using the Navajo meridian and baseline.

== See also ==
- List of principal and guide meridians and base lines of the United States
