= New Mexico meridian =

US survey line

Coordinates: 34°15′35.94″N 106°53′14.96154″W

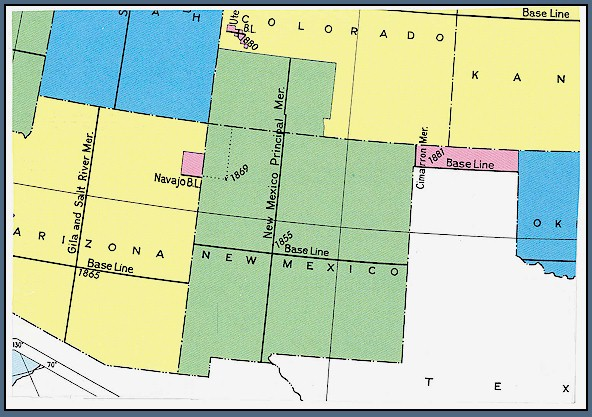
U.S. Bureau of Land Management map showing the principal meridians in New Mexico

The New Mexico meridian, is longitude 106° 53′ 40″ west from Greenwich. It extends throughout New Mexico and into Colorado, and together with the baseline, at latitude 34° 15′ 25″ north, governs township and range surveys in New Mexico, except those in the northwest corner of the state which refer to the Navajo meridian and baseline. The New Mexico meridian and Baseline also provide the basis for township and range surveys in the upper valley of the Rio Grande del Norte in Colorado.

The New Mexico meridian intersects the principal baseline, i.e. the initial point, above the Rio Grande, about ten miles (16 km) below the mouth of the Rio Puerco, on Black Butte just southeast of the village of San Acacia, New Mexico.

This meridian was established in 1855 by John W. Garretson, a surveyor for the U.S. government.

== See also ==
- List of principal and guide meridians and base lines of the United States
