= Saint Stephens meridian =

US survey line

Coordinates: 30°59′52.11″N 88°01′21.06″W

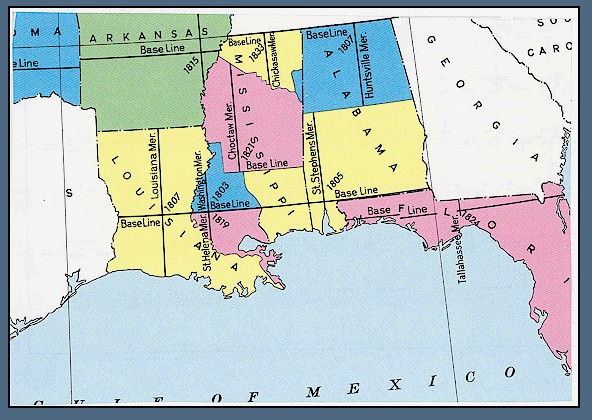
U.S. Bureau of Land Management map showing the principal meridians in Louisiana, Mississippi, and Alabama

The Saint Stephens meridian, in longitude 88° 02′ west from Greenwich, begins at the initial point (Ellicott's Corner), on the base line, in latitude 31° north, passes through Saint Stephens, Alabama, extends south to Mobile Bay and north to latitude 33° 06′ 20″, and governs the surveys in the southern district of Alabama, and in Pearl River district lying east of the river and south of the Choctaw Baseline, in latitude 31° 52′ 40″ north, in the state of Mississippi.

== Sources ==
- Raymond, William Galt (1914). Plane Surveying for Use in the Classroom and Field (via Internet Archive). New York: American Book Company.

== See also ==
- List of principal and guide meridians and base lines of the United States
