= Sweetpea Baking Company =

Vegan bakery in Portland, Oregon, U.S.

- The bakery's exterior, 2025
- Interactive map of Sweetpea Baking Company

Restaurant information
- Owner: Lisa Higgins
- Chef: Lisa Higgins
- Location: 1205 Southeast Stark Street, Portland, Multnomah, Oregon, 97214, United States
- Coordinates: 45.5195°N 122.6534°W
- Website: sweetpeabaking.com

Sweetpea Baking Company is a vegan bakery in Portland, Oregon, United States. Chef and owner Lisa Higgins operates the business on Stark Street in southeast Portland's Buckman neighborhood.

== Description ==
The vegan bakery Sweetpea Baking Company operates on Stark Street in southeast Portland's Buckman neighborhood. Willamette Week described the space as "lofty" with concrete floors and used primarily for production.

=== Menu ===
In addition to baked goods such as cakes and cupcakes, cookies, muffins, and croissants, the menu includes bagels, biscuits and gravy with seitan, breads, sandwiches, pot pies, soups, and coffee drinks. Among cake options is oatmeal with cinnamon and among cupcake options is chocolate with peanut butter frosting. Snickerdoodle is one of the cookie varieties. The Charlie Brown bar has chocolate and peanut butter. The Linzer bar has a nut-based crust and raspberry jam. Other baked goods have included a chocolate brownie and cookie sandwiches with cookies-and-cream frosting.

Schmears for bagels includes bacun scallion, garden vegetable, and strawberry. Among breakfast sandwiches is the Wirth-less, which is a biscuit with fried tofu, spinach, tomato, and hollandaise sauce. For brunch, Sweetpea has served Benedict and peach crisp. Coffee drinks are made using Stumptown.

The business has also offered seasonal specials, such as candy cane cheesecake, chocolate mousse pie, Dutch apple pie, and pumpkin pie during the Christmas and holiday season. Other seasonal specials featuring pumpkin have included chai bars, cream cheese danishes, chocolate chip cookies, spice cake, and small pies. In addition to pumpkin pie, Sweetpea has offered apple, chocolate silk, and Oregon berry pies for Thanksgiving. The bakery has also served bread rolls, gravy, and cranberry sauce for the holiday.

== History ==
Interior display case (2025)

Lisa Higgins is the chef and owner of Sweetpea.

In 2010, the Sweetpea posted an advertisement for a job opening seeking a vegan barista and counter worker. Following pushback from members of the community who considered this discrimination, the business updated the posting to specific a preference for a vegan worker, rather than a requirement.

Like many restaurants, Sweetpea operated via delivery and take-out at times during the COVID-19 pandemic. Sweetpea has supplied baked goods to Jet Black Coffee Company.

== Reception ==
Sweetpea was a runner-up in the Best Brunch category of Willamette Week's annual 'Best of Portland' readers' poll in 2010. Pete Cottell included the Charlie Brown bar in the newspaper's 2018 overview of eight "must-have munchies for when you're stoned and starving". Sweetpea was included in Portland Monthly's 2013 overview of the city's best vegan breakfast sandwiches.

== See also ==
- List of bakeries
- List of vegetarian and vegan restaurants
