= Indian meridian =

- U.S. National Register of Historic Places
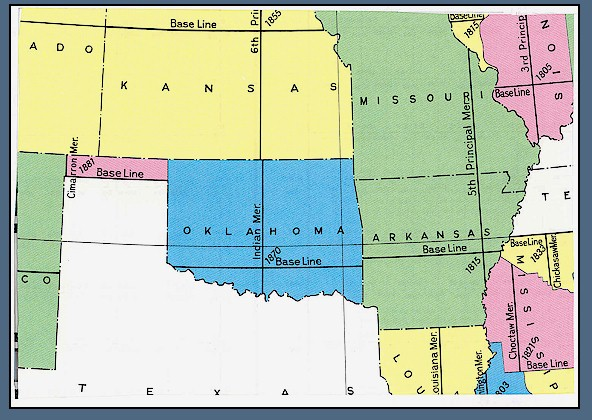
- U.S. Bureau of Land Management map showing the principal meridians in Oklahoma.

- Location within Oklahoma Location within the United States
- Location: Davis Vicinity, Garvin County, Oklahoma
- Coordinates: 34°30′24.44″N 97°14′51.16″W
- Built: 1870
- NRHP reference No.: 70000533
- Added to NRHP: October 6, 1970

The Indian meridian, in longitude 97° 14′ 30″ west from Greenwich, extends from Red River to the south boundary of Kansas, and, with the base line in latitude 34° 30′ north, governs the surveys in Oklahoma east of 100° west longitude from Greenwich (all of Oklahoma except the Oklahoma panhandle).

This line was chosen arbitrarily as part of the land survey of 1870 conducted by E. N. Darling and Thomas H. Barrett, at an arbitrary point about one mile south of Fort Arbuckle (about six miles west of present Davis, Oklahoma). From this initial point, the north–south line was designated as the Indian meridian and the East–West line was designated as the Indian baseline.

The Indian Meridian initial point is listed in the National Register of Historic Places with ID #70000533.

== See also ==
- List of principal and guide meridians and base lines of the United States

== Sources ==
- Raymond, William Galt (1914). Plane Surveying for Use in the Classroom and Field (via Internet Archive). New York: American Book Company.
