= Black Hills meridian =

US survey line

Coordinates: 43°59′44″N 104°03′16″W

The Black Hills meridian, longitude 104°03′ west from Greenwich, with the baseline in latitude 44° north, is the principal meridian that governs surveys in the state of South Dakota north and west of White River, and west of the Missouri River (between latitudes 45°55′20″ and 44°1′30″), the north and west boundaries of the Lower Brule Indian Reservation, and the west boundary of range 79 west, of the Fifth Principal Meridian system. It is named for the Black Hills of South Dakota and Wyoming.

== See also ==
- List of principal and guide meridians and base lines of the United States
