= San Bernardino meridian =

US survey line

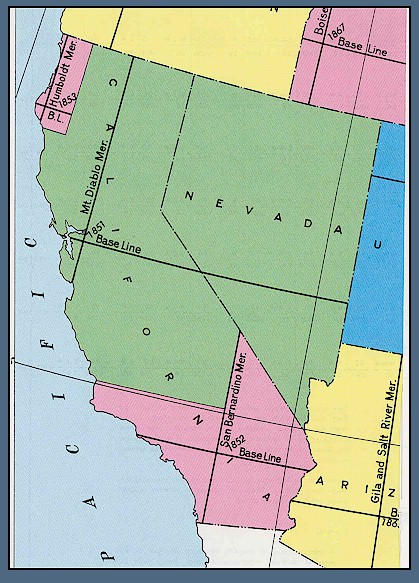
U.S. Bureau of Land Management map showing the principal meridians of California

The San Bernardino meridian, established in 1852, is one of three principal meridians in the state of California. Because of the state's shape, three meridian–baseline sets are required for surveys in all parts of the state. The San Bernardino meridian is used for Southern California, and some townships in Arizona are also referenced to it.

The initial point (datum) is at the summit of Mount San Bernardino, in the San Bernardino Mountains, in San Bernardino County, California. It is at an elevation of over 10,000 feet (3,000 meters).

The meridian runs north–south from the initial point 34°07′13″N 116°55′48″W.

== See also ==
- List of principal and guide meridians and base lines of the United States
