= Louisiana meridian =

US survey line

Coordinates: 31°00′31.91″N 92°24′55.72″W

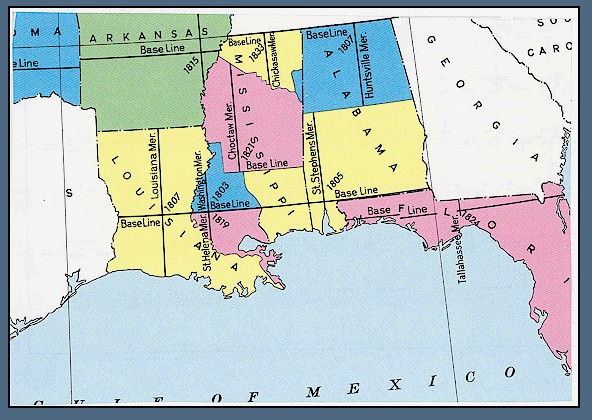
U.S. Bureau of Land Management map showing the principal meridians of Louisiana, Mississippi, and Alabama

The Louisiana meridian, in longitude 92° 24′ 15″ west of Greenwich, extends from the Gulf of Mexico to the north boundary of Louisiana, and with the baseline through the initial point conforming to the parallel of 31° north latitude, governs all the surveys in the state west of the Mississippi River.

== Sources ==
- Raymond, William Galt (1914). Plane Surveying for Use in the Classroom and Field (via Google Books). New York: American Book Company.

== See also ==
- List of principal and guide meridians and base lines of the United States
