= 1st meridian =

1st meridian may refer to:

- 1st meridian east, a line of longitude east of the Greenwich Meridian
- 1st meridian west, a line of longitude west of the Greenwich Meridian
- First principal meridian in Ohio and Indiana, United States, 84°48'50" west of Greenwich
- Principal meridian of the Dominion Land Survey in Canada, 97°27′28.41″ west of Greenwich
- Counter Revolutionary Warfare Unit a.k.a. First Meridian Squadron, a former special forces unit in the Fijian military

== See also ==
- Meridian 1, a Russian communications satellite
