= Principal meridians of Alaska =

US survey lines

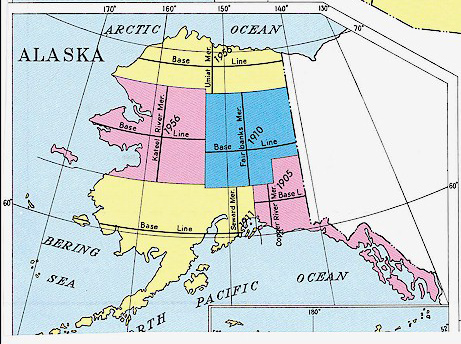
BLM map of the meridians

The five principal meridians of Alaska are the Copper River meridian (established 1905), Fairbanks meridian (adopted 1910), Kateel River meridian (adopted 1956), Seward meridian (adopted 1911) and Umiat meridian (adopted 1956).

== Initial points ==
Name	Adopted	Initial point
Copper River Meridian	1905	61°49′04″N 145°18′37″W
Fairbanks Meridian	1910	64°51′49.08″N 147°38′35.16″W
Kateel River Meridian	1956	65°26′16.374″N 158°45′31.01″W
Seward Meridian	1911	60°07′37″N 149°21′26″W
Umiat Meridian	1956	69°23′29.654″N 152°00′04.55″W

== See also ==
- List of principal and guide meridians and base lines of the United States
- Public Land Survey System
