= 4th meridian =

4th meridian may refer to:

- 4th meridian east, a line of longitude east of the Greenwich Meridian
- 4th meridian west, a line of longitude west of the Greenwich Meridian
- The Fourth Principal Meridian in Illinois, United States, 90°27'11" west of Greenwich
- The Fourth Principal Extended Meridian in Minnesota and Wisconsin, United States, 90°25'37" west of Greenwich
- The Fourth Meridian of the Dominion Land Survey in Canada, 110° west of Greenwich
