= List of principal and guide meridians and base lines of the United States =

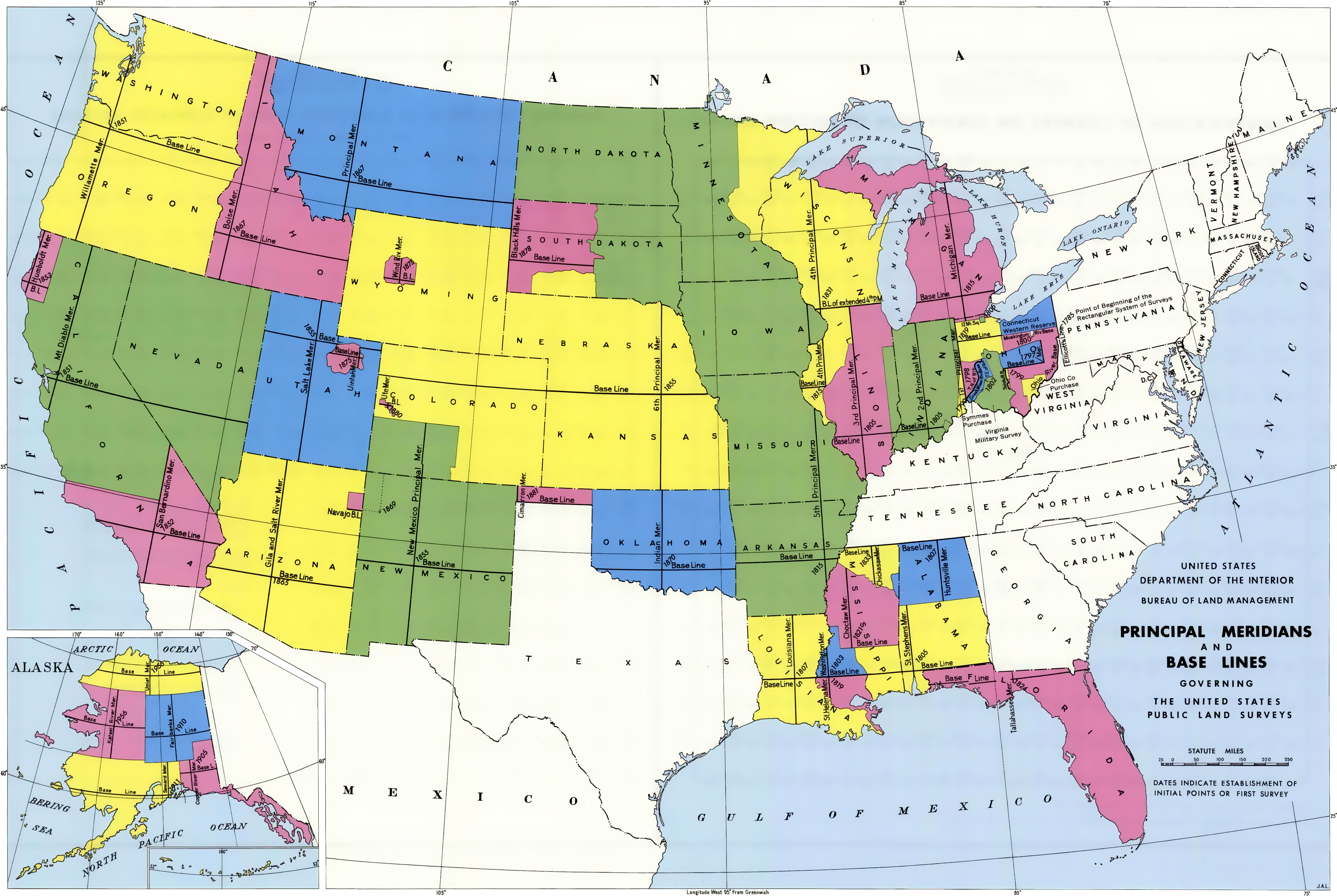
Figure 1. This BLM map depicts the principal meridians and baselines used for surveying states (colored) in the PLSS.

The following are the principal and guide meridians and base lines of the United States, with the year established and a brief summary of what areas' land surveys are based on each.

== List of meridians ==
Primarily from the United States Government Printing Office Style Manual. State names usually signify only parts of each listed state, unless otherwise indicated.

Based on the BLM manual's 1973 publication date, and the reference to Clarke's Spheroid of 1866 in section 2-82, coordinates appear to be in the NAD27 datum.

=== Principal Meridians ===
Meridian	Longitude	Associated Baseline	Latitude	Adopted	Area surveyed
First principal	84°48′11″W		40°59′22″N	1819	Ohio (NW)
First principal	84°48′11″W		40°59′22″N	1819	Indiana (sliver of SE)
Second principal	86°27′21″W		38°28′14″N	1805	Illinois (far E)
Second principal	86°27′21″W		38°28′14″N	1805	Indiana (almost all)
Third principal	89°08′54″W	Centralia	38°28′27″N	1805	Illinois (most)
Fourth principal	90°27′11″W	Beardstown	40°00′50″N	1815	Illinois (W of Illinois River and 3rd principal meridian)
Fourth principal (extended)	90°25′37″W	Illinois–Wisconsin border	42°30′27″N	1831	Minnesota (NE)
Fourth principal (extended)	90°25′37″W	Illinois–Wisconsin border	42°30′27″N	1831	Wisconsin (all)
Fifth principal	91°03′07″W		34°38′45″N	1815	Arkansas (all)
Fifth principal	91°03′07″W		34°38′45″N	1815	Iowa (all)
Fifth principal	91°03′07″W		34°38′45″N	1815	Minnesota (most)
Fifth principal	91°03′07″W		34°38′45″N	1815	Missouri (all)
Fifth principal	91°03′07″W		34°38′45″N	1815	North Dakota (all)
Fifth principal	91°03′07″W		34°38′45″N	1815	South Dakota (E half)
Sixth principal	97°22′08″W		40°00′07″N	1855	Colorado (most)
Sixth principal	97°22′08″W		40°00′07″N	1855	Kansas (all)
Sixth principal	97°22′08″W		40°00′07″N	1855	Nebraska (all)
Sixth principal	97°22′08″W		40°00′07″N	1855	South Dakota (some of S)
Sixth principal	97°22′08″W		40°00′07″N	1855	Wyoming (most)
Black Hills	104°03′16″W	Black Hills	43°59′44″N	1878	South Dakota (W)
Boise	116°23′35″W		43°22′21″N	1867	Idaho (all)
Chickasaw	89°14′47″W		35°01′58″N	1833	Mississippi
Choctaw	90°14′41″W	Choctaw	31°52′32″N	1821	Mississippi
Cimarron	103°00′07″W		36°30′05″N	1881	Oklahoma (panhandle)
Copper River	145°18′37″W		61°49′04″N	1905	Alaska
Fairbanks	147°38′25.949″W		64°51′50.048″N	1910	Alaska
Gila and Salt River	112°18′19″W		33°22′38″N	1865	Arizona (most)
Humboldt	124°07′10″W		40°25′02″N	1853	California
Huntsville	86°34′16″W		34°59′27″N	1807	Alabama
Huntsville	86°34′16″W		34°59′27″N	1807	Mississippi
Indian	97°14′49″W		34°29′32″N	1870	Oklahoma (most)
Kateel River	158°45′31.014″W		65°26′16.374″N	1956	Alaska
Louisiana	92°24′55″W		31°00′31″N	1807	Louisiana
Michigan	84°21′53″W		42°25′28″N	1815	Michigan
Michigan	84°21′53″W		42°25′28″N	1815	Ohio
Montana	111°39′33″W		45°47′13″N	1867	Montana
Mount Diablo	121°54′47″W		37°52′54″N	1851	California
Mount Diablo	121°54′47″W		37°52′54″N	1851	Nevada
Navajo	108°31′59″W	Navajo	35°44′56″N	1869	Arizona (NE)
Navajo	108°31′59″W	Navajo	35°44′56″N	1869	New Mexico (NW, formerly)
New Mexico principal	106°53′12″W		34°15′35″N	1855	New Mexico
New Mexico principal	106°53′12″W		34°15′35″N	1855	Colorado (SW)
St. Helena	91°09′36″W		30°59′56″N	1819	Louisiana
St. Stephens	88°01′20″W	St. Stephens	30°59′51″N	1805	Alabama
St. Stephens	88°01′20″W	St. Stephens	30°59′51″N	1805	Mississippi
Salt Lake	111°53′27″W		40°46′11″N	1855	Utah (most)
San Bernardino	116°55′48″W		34°07′13″N	1852	California
San Bernardino	116°55′48″W		34°07′13″N	1852	Arizona (some townships)
Seward	149°21′26″W		60°07′37″N	1911	Alaska
Tallahassee	84°16′38″W		30°26′03″N	1824	Florida
Tallahassee	84°16′38″W		30°26′03″N	1824	Alabama
Uintah	109°56′06″W		40°25′59″N	1875	Utah (part of NE)
Umiat	152°00′04.551″W		69°23′29.654″N	1956	Alaska
Ute	108°31′59″W		39°06′23″N	1880	Colorado
Washington (Mississippi)	91°09′36″W		30°59′56″N	1803	Mississippi
Willamette	122°44′34″W	Willamette	45°31′11″N	1851	Oregon
Willamette	122°44′34″W	Willamette	45°31′11″N	1851	Washington
Wind River	108°48′49″W		43°00′41″N	1875	Wyoming (part of W)

=== Guide Meridians ===
Meridian	Longitude	Associated Baseline	Latitude	Adopted	Area surveyed	Notes
Ashley guide meridian					Utah	
Beaverhead guide meridian					Montana	
Belt Mountain guide meridian					Montana	
Big Hole guide meridian					Montana	
Bitterroot guide meridian					Montana	
Boulder guide meridian					Montana	
Browning guide meridian					Montana	
Buffalo Creek guide meridian					Montana	
Carson River guide meridian					Nevada	
Castle Valley guide meridian					Utah	
Colorado guide meridian					Utah	
Columbia guide meridian					Washington	
Colville guide meridian					Washington	
Coulson guide meridian					Montana	
Deer Lodge guide meridian					Montana	
Deschutes meridian					Oregon	
Emery Valley guide meridian					Utah	
Flathead guide meridian					Montana	
Fort Belknap guide meridian					Montana	
Fremont Valley guide meridian					Utah	
Grand River guide meridian					Utah	
Grande Ronde guide meridian					Oregon	
Green River guide meridian					Utah	
Haystack Butte guide meridian					Montana	
Helena guide meridian					Montana	
Henry Mountain guide meridian					Utah	
Horse Plains guide meridian					Montana	
Humboldt River guide meridian					Nevada	
Jefferson guide meridian					Montana	
Judith guide meridian					Montana	
Kanab guide meridian					Utah	
Kolob guide meridian					Utah	
Little Porcupine guide meridian					Montana	
Maginnis guide meridian					Montana	
Musselshell guide meridian					Montana	
New Mexico guide meridian					New Mexico and Colorado	
Panguitch guide meridian					Utah	
Passamari guide meridian					Montana	
Pine Valley guide meridian					Utah	
Red Rock guide meridian					Montana	
Reese River guide meridian					Nevada	
Ruby Valley guide meridian					Nevada	
Sevier Lake guide meridian					Utah	
Shields River guide meridian					Montana	
Smith River guide meridian					Montana	
Snake Valley guide meridian					Utah	
Square Butte guide meridian					Montana	
Sweet Grass guide meridian					Montana	
Teton guide meridian					Montana	
Valley Creek guide meridian					Montana	
Wah Wah guide meridian					Utah	
Whatcom County guide meridian	122°30'	Willamette Meridian			Whatcom County, Washington	12 miles east of Willamette Meridian, much of which is in Salish Sea at this latitude. Followed by Guide Road / Old Guide Road / Washington State Route 539 in Whatcom County, Meridian Street in Bellingham, Washington.
Willow Springs guide meridian					Utah	
Yantic guide meridian					Montana	
Yellowstone guide meridian					Montana	

== Ohio Lands ==
Some parts of the Ohio Lands (now Ohio) were laid out in survey townships, but based on other points not listed above:

- Base Line of the United States Military Survey (1797)
- Great Miami River baseline (1798)
- Ohio River (1785) — also part of Indiana
- Muskingum River baseline (1800)
- Scioto River baseline (1799)
- Twelve Mile Square Reserve (1805)

== See also ==
- Public Land Survey System — the basis of most meridians in the United States
