= Ellicott's Stone =

Historic boundary marker in Mobile County, Alabama, US

- Ellicott Stone
- U.S. National Register of Historic Places
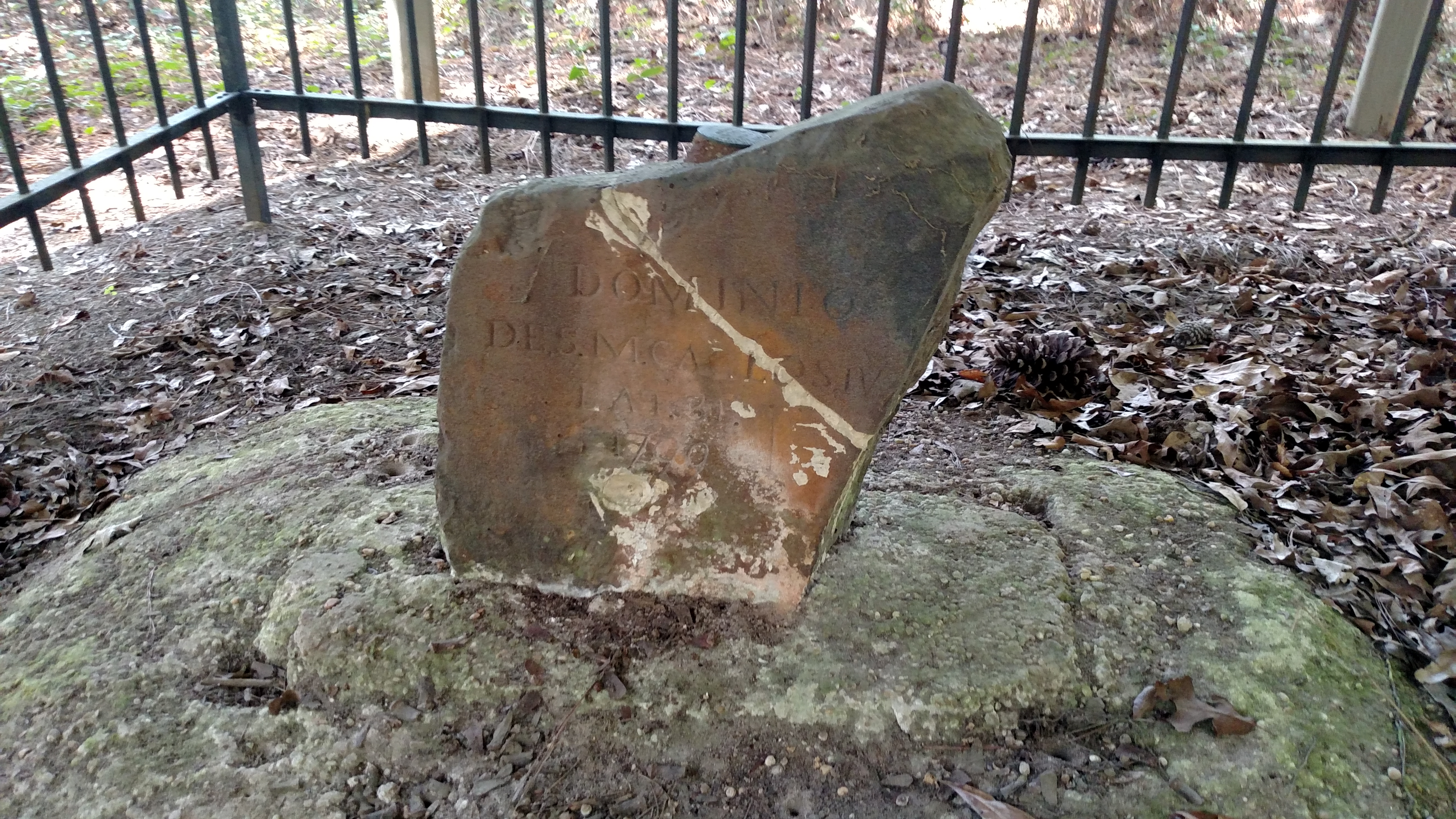
- The south side of the stone. It reads: Dominio De S.M. Carlos IV, Lat. 31, 1799.

- Location within Alabama Location within the United States
- Nearest city: Bucks, Alabama
- Coordinates: 30°59′52.11″N 88°01′21.06″W
- Area: less than one acre
- Built: 1799
- NRHP reference No.: 73000359
- Added to NRHP: April 11, 1973

Ellicott's Stone, also known as the Ellicott Stone, is a boundary marker in northern Mobile County, Alabama. It was placed on April 10, 1799, by a joint U.S.–Spanish survey party headed by Andrew Ellicott. It was designated by the American Society of Civil Engineers as a Historic Civil Engineering Landmark in 1968 and was added to the National Register of Historic Places on April 11, 1973.

It is the only known stone monument set by Ellicott when he surveyed the 31st parallel north latitude, which served as the boundary line between the Mississippi Territory in the United States and Spanish West Florida. The boundary line extended along the 31st parallel from the Mississippi River east to the Chattahoochee River, as set forth in the 1795 Pinckney Treaty, formally known as the Treaty of San Lorenzo.

Ellicott's Stone is the initial point for all United States Public Land surveys in the southern region of Alabama and Mississippi. It is the point of intersection of what is known today as the St. Stephens meridian and the St. Stephens baseline. All townships in the area are numbered from the stone.

The marker stone is located east of U.S. Route 43 in Ellicott Stone Historical Park, about 1 mile (1.6 km) south of Bucks, Alabama. The park was established in 1917. It is now near the James M. Barry Electric Generating Plant, west of the Mobile River.

== Description ==
The stone marker, a ferruginous sandstone block about two feet (600 mm) high and eight inches (200 mm) thick, is near the west bank of the Mobile River. On the northern side of the stone is an inscription stating "U.S. Lat. 31, 1799." The inscription on the southern side reads "Dominio De S.M. Carlos IV, Lat. 31, 1799." (Dominion of his majesty King Charles IV, Lat. 31, 1799)
