= Salt Lake meridian =

US survey line

Coordinates: 40°46′10.31″N 111°53′28.80″W

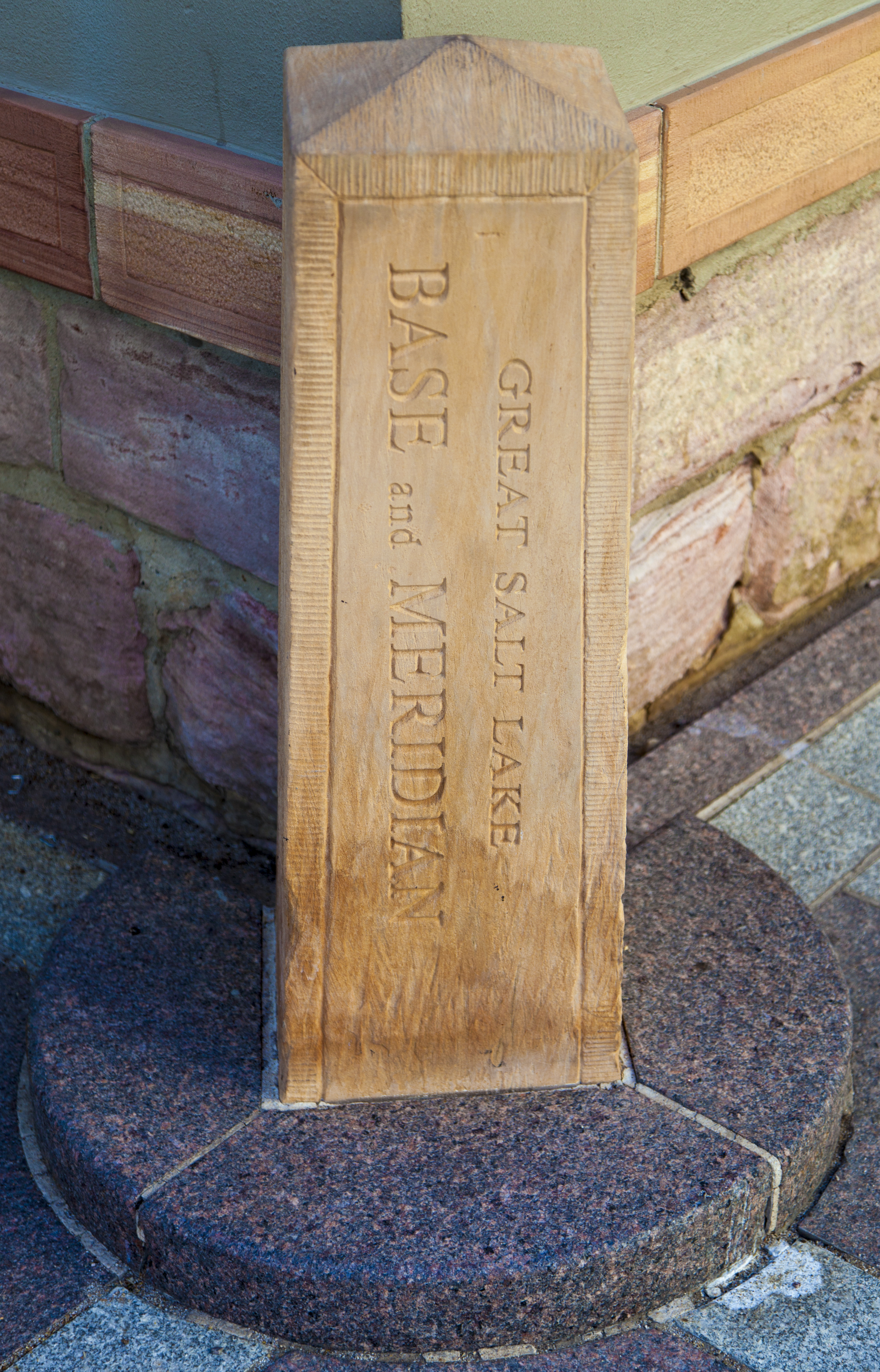
The Great Salt Lake Base and Meridian monument

The Salt Lake meridian, established in 1855, in longitude 111° 54′ 00″ west from Greenwich, has its initial point at southeast corner of Temple Square, in Salt Lake City, Utah, extends north and south through the state, and, with the base line, through the initial, and coincident with the parallel of 40° 46′ 04″ north latitude, governs the surveys in the territory, except those referred to the Uintah meridian and Baseline projected from an initial point in latitude 40° 26′ 20″ north, longitude 109° 57′ 30″ west from Greenwich.

== See also ==
- List of principal and guide meridians and base lines of the United States
- Mormon settlement techniques of the Salt Lake Valley
