= Wind River meridian =

US survey line

Coordinates: 43°00′41.05″N 108°48′51.61″W

The Wind River meridian, established in 1875, is one of the principal meridians for Wyoming. The initial point is near Fort Washakie, Wyoming.

== See also ==
- List of principal and guide meridians and base lines of the United States
