= Ute meridian =

US survey line

Coordinates: 39°06′22.50″N 108°32′01.32″W

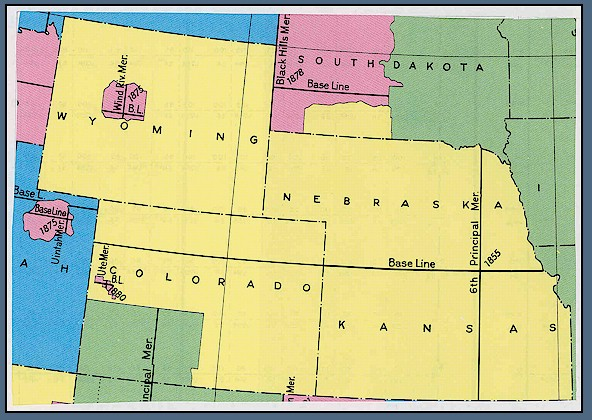
U.S. Bureau of Land Management map showing the principal meridians used for Colorado

The Ute meridian, also known as the Grand River meridian, was established in 1880 and is a principal meridian of Colorado. The initial point lies inside the boundaries of Grand Junction Regional Airport, Grand Junction, Colorado.

== See also ==
- List of principal and guide meridians and base lines of the United States
