= Mount Diablo meridian =

US survey line

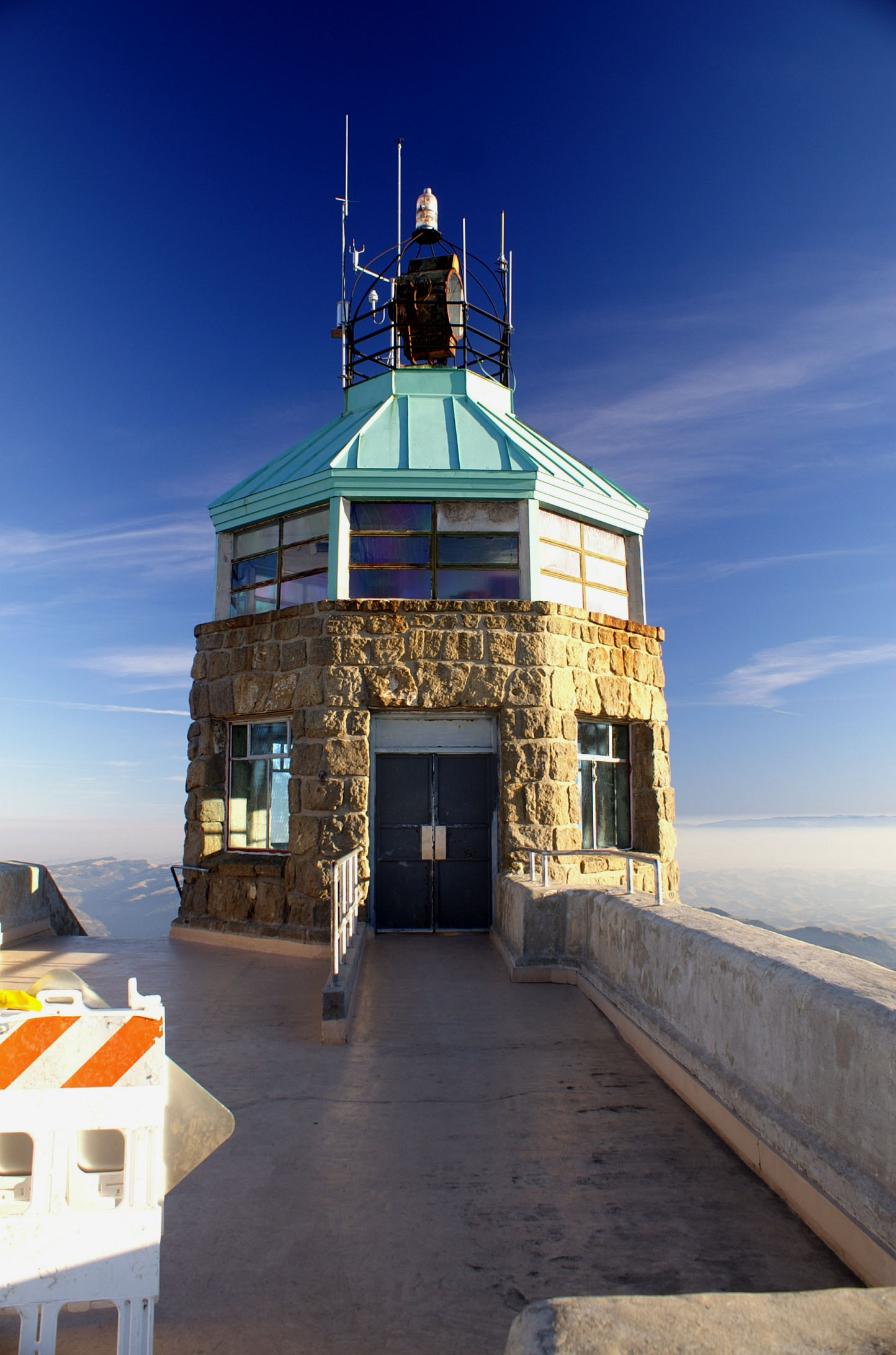
Summit beacon tower atop Mt. Diablo. The initial point marker lies within this tower.

The Mount Diablo Meridian, established in 1851, is a principal meridian extending north and south from its initial point atop Mount Diablo in California at W 121° 54.845. Established under the U.S. Public Land Survey System, it is used to describe lands in most of northern California and all of Nevada. Mount Diablo also marks the baseline at latitude 37°52′54″N.

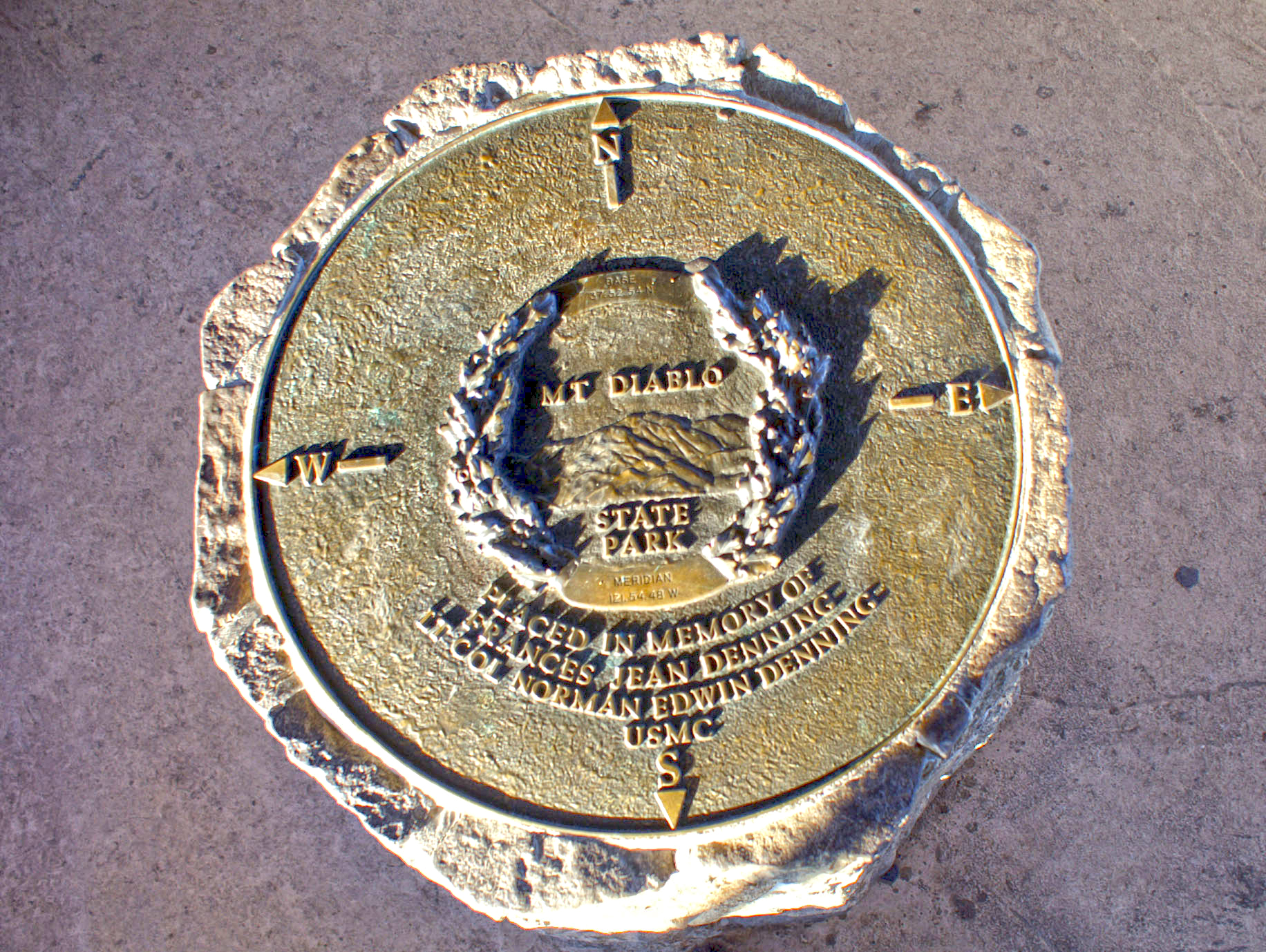
Mount Diablo Memorial Marker

== See also ==
- List of principal and guide meridians and base lines of the United States
