= John Wesley Garretson =

- Born: 19 May 1812; Sumner County, Tennessee, United States
- Died: May 7, 1895 (aged 82); San Antonio, Texas, United States
- Occupation: Surveyor
- Known for: New Mexico meridian

John Wesley Garretson (19 May 1812 – 7 May 1895) was a surveyor who mapped large areas of Arkansas, New Mexico and Texas in the nineteenth century.

== Early years ==
Garretson was born on 19 May 1812 in Sumner County, Tennessee, not far from Nashville. His father died while he was young. In 1836 Garretson joined the Tennessee Mounted Militia and served for six months in the Seminole Wars in Florida.

== Arkansas ==
Garretson obtained work as a surveyor with the U.S. General Land Office, assisting with surveys in Arkansas until 1855. He became a friend of William Pelham, who was appointed Surveyor General of Arkansas in 1841. In September 1846 he married Sarah Sheppard (née Conway), the widow of U.S. Deputy Surveyor Joseph Sheppard and sister of William Pelham's wife. In October 1852 L. Gibson, Surveyor General of Arkansas, described Garretson as a "very skilful and experienced deputy", who had been assigned to correct extensive work by Cyrus Crosby, which had been found to be inaccurate.

It was on Garretson's suggestion that the survey instituted the practice of using pits rather than mounds to indicate the positions of corners in prairies. He had noted that when re-surveying township boundaries the original monuments had usually disappeared without trace, but the pit dug to obtain earth to make the mound still remained. There are records of his contract work in Arkansas in 1854, when the wet season forced him to relinquish the survey of eight townships. Again, he was being employed to correct the possibly fraudulent work of others.

== New Mexico ==
When Pelham was appointed Surveyor General of New Mexico in 1854 he invited Garretson to come to Santa Fe. On 9 March 1855 Garretson was given the job of establishing the initial point, central meridian and base line for New Mexico. He fixed the initial point on a hill to the east of the San Acacia cemetery. This was the fixed position from which New Mexico's survey lines would be laid out and used to define land titles that had existed prior to the 1848 peace treaty under which Mexico had ceded New Mexico to the United States. He was the sole contractor for Pelham for the next three years, prompting newspaper accusations of nepotism. Until 1858, Garretson was mostly employed in the lucrative work of surveying standard parallels and guide meridians. In January 1858 he obtained a divorce. He returned to Arkansas, and in August 1858 married Annie Wilson.

On 10 June 1859 Garretson accepted a contract from Pelham to survey the external boundaries of Pecos Pueblo's league, a grant that ran a league east and west of each corner of the ruins of the pueblo. The tools he used were standard for that time: a Burt's compass, a sixty-six foot chain, and long poles to control for changes in elevation between shots. On 22 December 1858 the U.S. Congress confirmed the 110,080 acres (44,550 ha) Isleta Pueblo grant. As Deputy Surveyor, in October 1859 Garretson undertook a full survey of the Isleta grant. A patent was issued to the Pueblo on 1 November 1863. The survey was later disputed, since Garretson had taken the base of the Manzano Mountains as the eastern boundary of the grant, while the Indians claimed the land up to the crest of the mountains, with its valuable woods and pastures.

Conditions in New Mexico were harsh and the territory was still unsettled. In 1857 a band of Gila Apaches rustled several head of Garretson's cattle from near Robledo. In September 1859 his compass-man drowned in trying to cross the Rio Grande near Cochiti. The work was discouraging at times. He noted in his diary, "...there are not any settlements nor will there ever be ... there is not an acre of land ... that can ever be cultivated."

== Later years ==
Garretson moved to Texas in 1859, where he bought 4,605 acres (1,864 ha) of land to the south of San Antonio. He had $26,000 in gold, a small fortune at that time, and looked forward to retiring as a gentleman rancher. However, most of his money was lost in the American Civil War (1861–1865), and he was forced to work the land himself to support his growing family. He also taught at school for a while, and undertook survey work for the New York and Texas Land Co., which owned three million acres of Texas railroad grants. Garretson died in San Antonio on May 7, 1895.
