= Mount Pierce (California) =

Mountain in California, United States

- Location within California

Highest point
- Peak: 3179
- Elevation: 969 m (3,179 ft)
- Coordinates: 40°25′3″N 124°7′15″W

Geography
- Country: United States
- State: California
- District: Humboldt County
- Topo map: USGS Scotia

Mount Pierce, sometimes called Pierce Mountain or Monument Peak at 3179 ft (949 m), is the highest point of the Monument Ridge which is part of the Coast Range in Humboldt County, California. It was named after U.S. President Franklin Pierce (1804–69). The summit offers a wide view of a wide area in Humboldt, Mendocino, Trinity and Del Norte counties north to the state of Oregon.

Due to the high visibility of the top of Mount Pierce and the inability to see Mount Diablo from the northwestern corner of the state, a new principal meridian, the Humboldt meridian was established in 1853 intersecting the survey base line at the summit of Mount Pierce which still governs the surveys in the northwestern corner of California.

The summit of Mount Pierce was marked with a tower of iron bars, now gone, but currently noted by an array of antennas, a geodetic marker and a plaque, placed on October 4, 2003, on the sesquicentennial of the establishment of the Humboldt Meridian Initial Point by Deputy Surveyor Henry Washington on October 6, 1853. The center of the Initial Point is marked by a standard US Coast and Geodetic Survey triangulation station disc, stamped “Mt. Pierce 1928.”
