= Initial Point (Oklahoma) =

- U.S. National Register of Historic Places
- Nearest city: Davis, Oklahoma
- Coordinates: 34°30′24″N 97°14′49″W
- Area: 1 acre (0.40 ha)
- NRHP reference No.: 70000533
- Added to NRHP: October 6, 1970

Initial Point, on the boundary of Garvin County, Oklahoma and Murray County, Oklahoma, about 7.5 miles (12.1 km) west of Davis, Oklahoma, is a historic surveying initial point which was listed on the National Register of Historic Places in 1970.

It includes one contributing object, a sandstone marker monument approximately 54x18x18 in dimension. It was set "in a mound of stones six feet in diameter and three feet high, from which flagstaff at Fort Arbuckle bears north seven degrees, thirty-seven minutes west."

Initial Point, or the "Point of Beginning," was established by United States General Land Office surveyors in 1870. From this point all land in Indian Territory and Oklahoma Territory, and later the State of Oklahoma except for its Panhandle, was surveyed and described. It is considered one of the notable initial points in the United States.

At the time of its establishment, Initial Point was located in Pickens County, Chickasaw Nation.
