= Third principal meridian =

US Survey line

Coordinates: 38°28′26″N 89°08′40″W

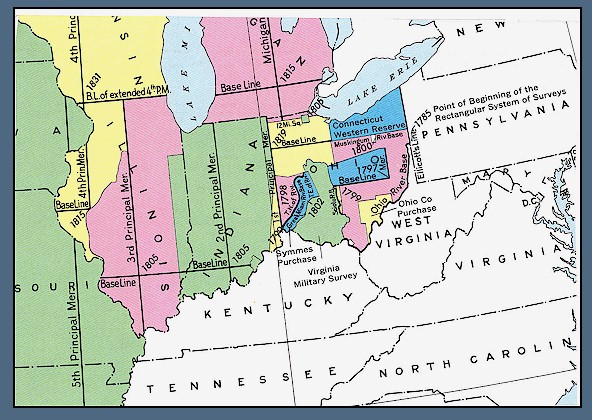
U.S. Bureau of Land Management map showing the principal meridians in Illinois, Indiana, and Ohio

The third principal meridian begins at the mouth of the Ohio River and extends north to the northern boundary of the state of Illinois, and with the base line in latitude 38° 28′ 20″, governs the surveys in the state east of the third principal meridian, with the exception of those projected from the second principal meridian, and the surveys on the west, to the Illinois River. This meridian is nearly coincident with 89° 10′ 15″ of west longitude from Greenwich.

== Sources ==
- Raymond, William Galt (1914). Plane Surveying for Use in the Classroom and Field (via Internet Archive). New York: American Book Company.
- "Chapter Five: Land Surveying". Survey Manual (PDF). Springfield, Illinois: Illinois Department of Transportation, Bureau of Design and Environment. 2003-02-28. p. 5. Archived from the original (PDF) on 2011-05-25.
