= Montana meridian =

US survey line

Coordinates: 45°47′12.82″N 111°39′35.57″W

The Montana meridian extends north and south from the initial monument on the summit of a limestone hill, 800 feet (240 meters) high, longitude 111° 39′ 33″ west from Greenwich, and, with the base line on the parallel of 45° 47′ 13″ north latitude, governs the surveys in the state of Montana. The initial point lies near Willow Creek, Montana.

== See also ==
- List of principal and guide meridians and base lines of the United States

== Sources ==
- Raymond, William Galt (1914). Plane Surveying for Use in the Classroom and Field (via Google Books). New York: American Book Company.
