= Uintah meridian =

US survey line

Coordinates: 40°25′58.44″N 109°56′7.54″W

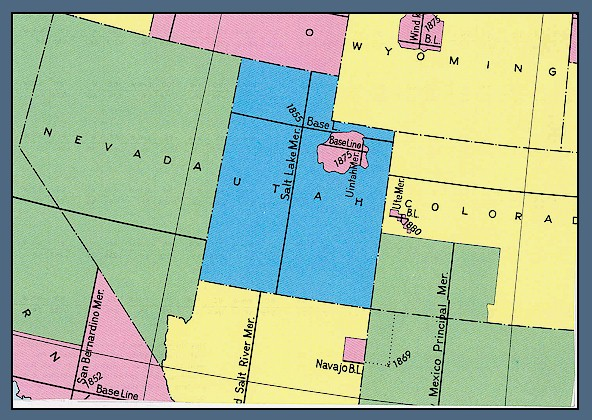
U.S. Bureau of Land Management map showing the principal meridians in Utah

The Uintah meridian, also called the Uintah Special Meridian (USM) has a center point north of Roosevelt, Utah. The Uintah meridian was established in 1875, and governs land surveys in the Uintah and Ouray Indian Reservation in the state of Utah.

== See also ==
- List of principal and guide meridians and base lines of the United States
