= Chickasaw meridian =

Coordinates: 34°59′40.46″N 89°14′48.99″W

The Chickasaw meridian begins on the north boundary of Mississippi in latitude 34° 59' north, longitude 89° 15' west from Greenwich, extends south to latitude 33° 48' 45" north, and governs the surveys in north Mississippi.

== See also ==
- List of principal and guide meridians and base lines of the United States
