= Huntsville meridian =

US survey line

Coordinates: 34°59′27.0″N 86°34′16.0″W

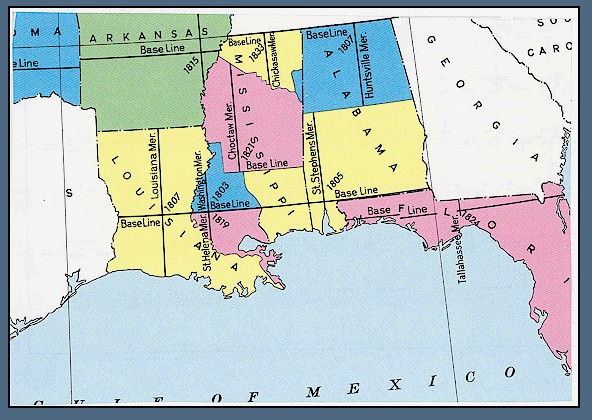
U.S. Bureau of Land Management map showing the principal meridians of Louisiana, Mississippi, and Alabama

The Huntsville meridian begins on the northern boundary of Alabama, in latitude 34° 59′ 27" north, longitude 86° 34′ 16″ west from Greenwich, extends south to latitude 33° 06′ 20″ north, and governs the surveys in the northern district of Alabama.

Within the city of Huntsville, Alabama, Meridian Street coincides with the Huntsville Meridian for most of its length north of US-72. The marker for the Huntsville Meridian is in the Maple Hill Cemetery near downtown Huntsville.

== Sources ==
- Raymond, William Galt (1914). Plane Surveying for Use in the Classroom and Field (via Internet Archive). New York: American Book Company.

== See also ==
- List of principal and guide meridians and base lines of the United States
