= Second principal meridian =

US Survey line

Coordinates: 38°28′10.02″N 86°27′21.17″W

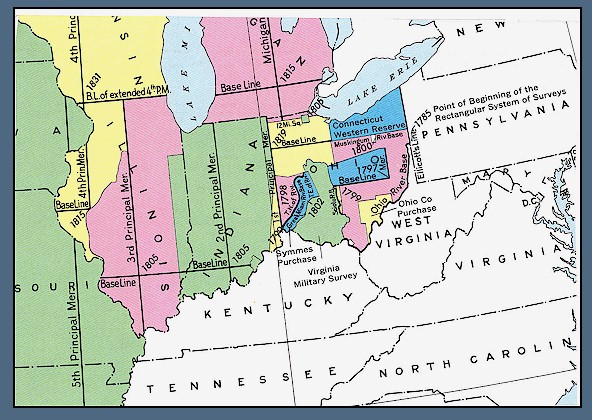
U.S. Bureau of Land Management map showing the principal meridians in Illinois, Indiana, and Ohio

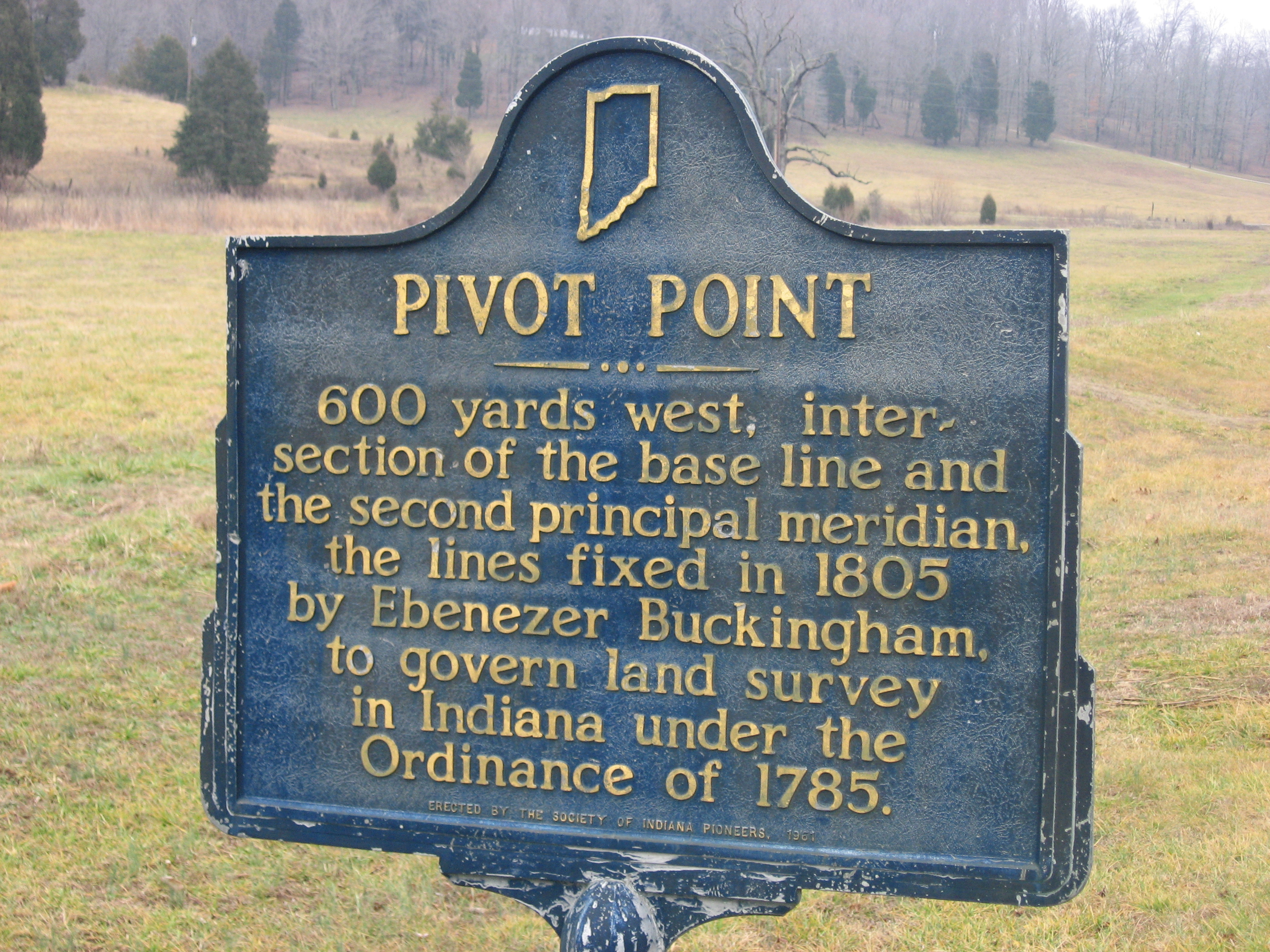
Sign along Indiana Route 37, pointing to meeting of the Second Principal Meridian and the Indiana base line

The second principal meridian, or Paoli Meridian, coincides with 86° 28′ of longitude west from Greenwich, starts from a point two and one half miles west of the confluence of the Little Blue and Ohio rivers, runs north to the northern boundary of Indiana, and, with the base line in latitude 38° 28′ 20″, governs the surveys in Indiana and part of those in Illinois.

== See also ==
- List of principal and guide meridians and base lines of the United States

== Sources ==
- Raymond, William Galt (1914). Plane Surveying for Use in the Classroom and Field (via Internet Archive). New York: American Book Company.
- "Chapter Five: Land Surveying". Survey Manual (PDF). Springfield, Illinois: Illinois Department of Transportation, Bureau of Design and Environment. 2003-02-28. p. 5. Archived from the original (PDF) on 2011-05-25.
