= Gila and Salt River meridian =

US survey line in Arizona

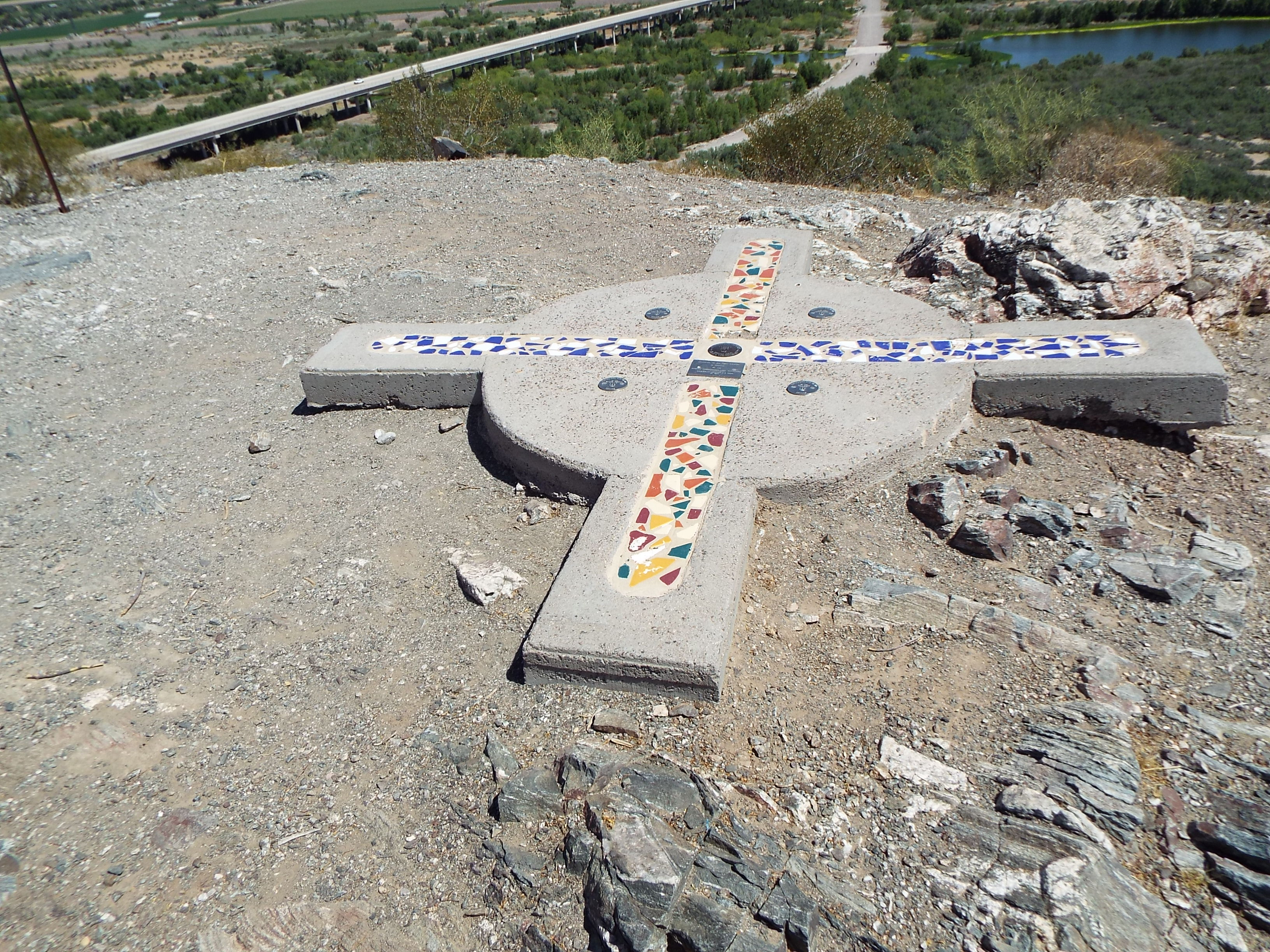
Initial point of the Gila and Salt River Meridan

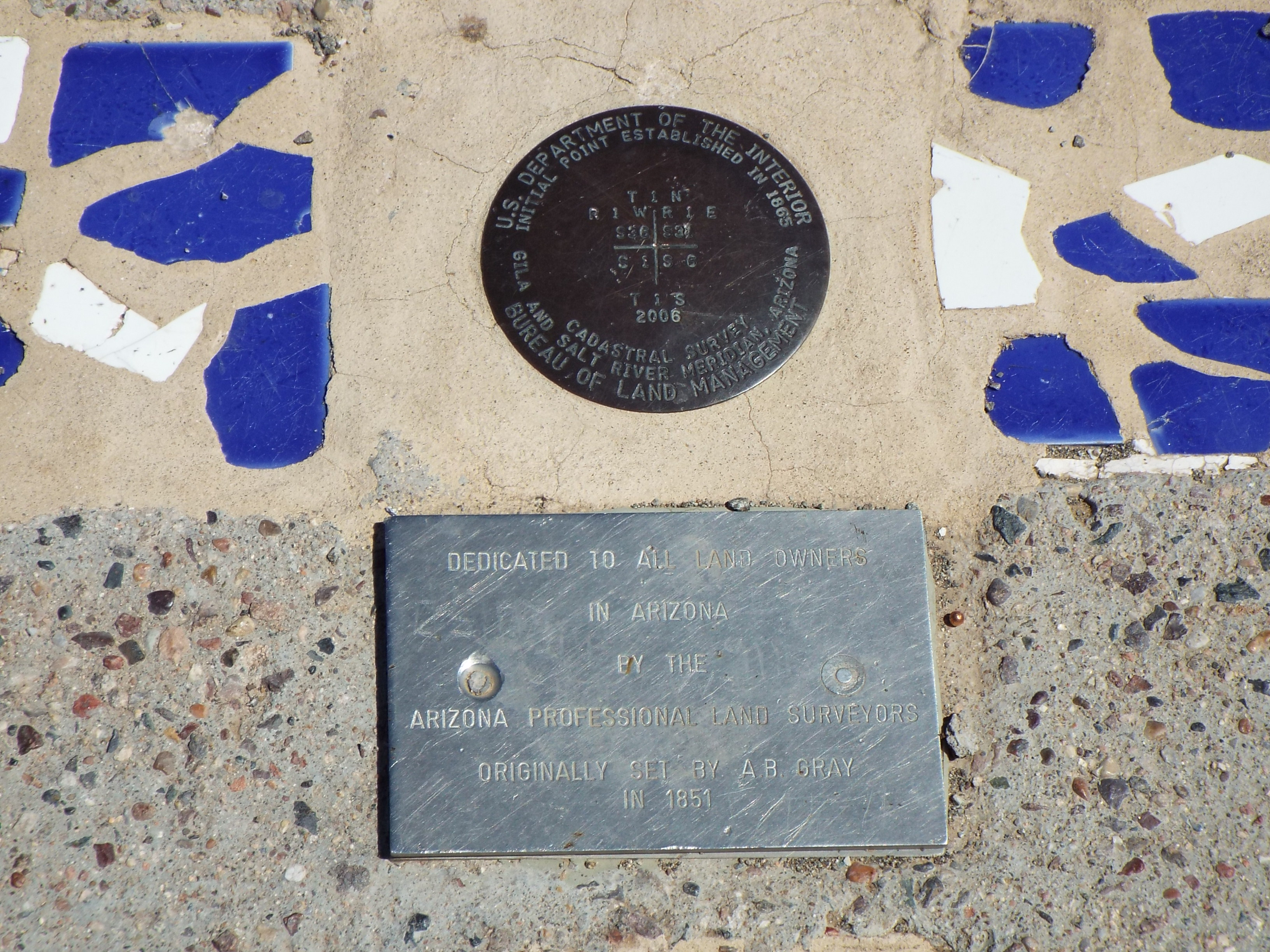
Marker of the initial point of the Gila and Salt River Meridan on Monument Hill in Avondale. The following is engraved on the round marker: U.S. Department of the Interior Bureau of Land Management. Initial Point of Establishment in 1865. Gila and Salt River Meridian, Arizona. Cadastral Survey. The rectangular marker states the following: Dedicated to all land owners in Arizona by the Arizona Professional Land Surveyors originally set by A. B. Gray in 1851.

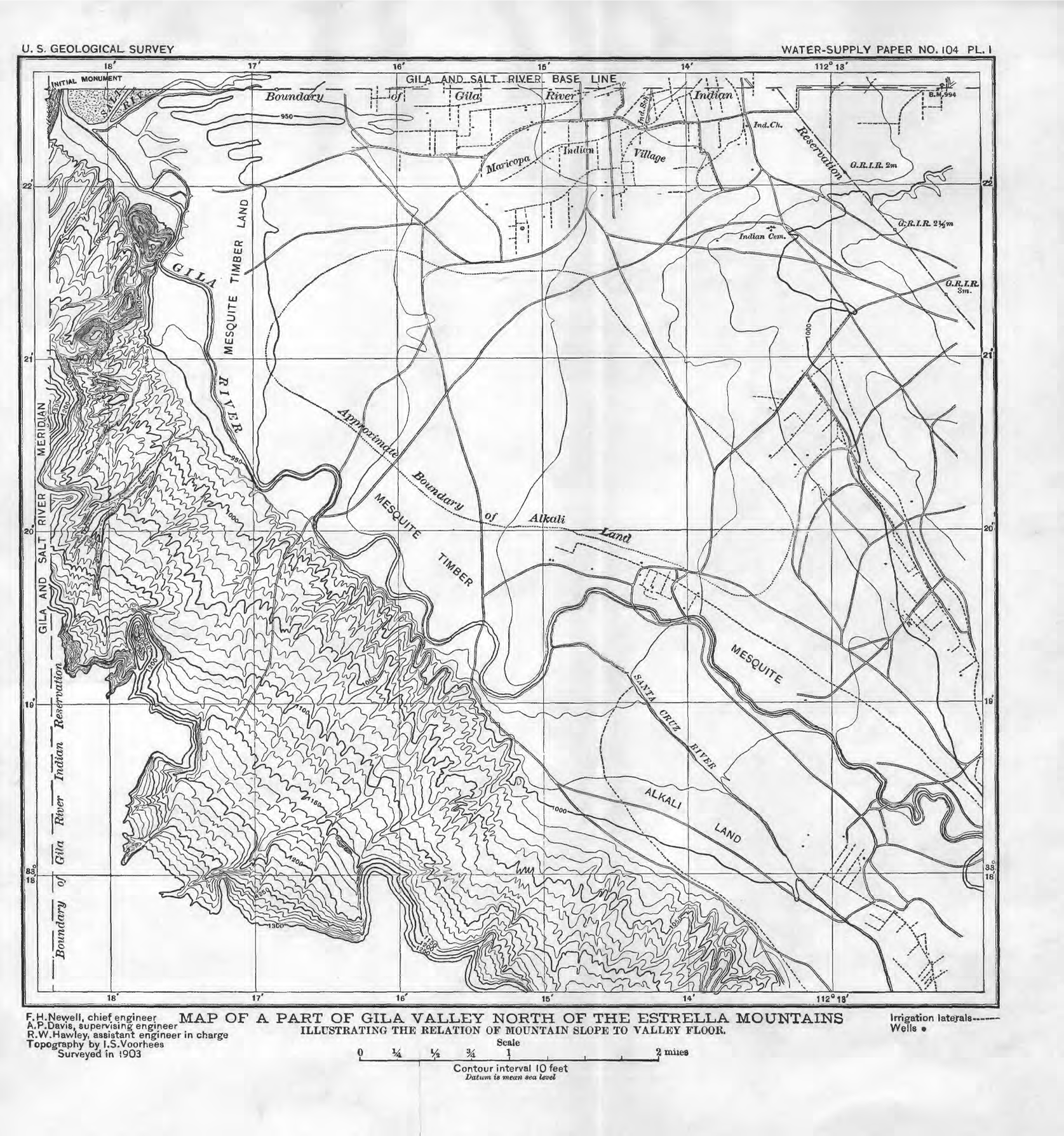
Map of Gila Valley, Arizona USGS indicating Gila and Salt River initial point, meridian and baseline

The Gila and Salt River Meridian intersects the initial point on the south side of the Gila River, opposite the mouth of Salt River, at latitude 33° 22′ 37.82733″ north, longitude 112° 18′ 21.99931″ west from Greenwich based on NAD 83, and governs the surveys in the territory of Arizona. The current declination for the initial point is 12° east. It is located on Monument Hill, an easily visible hill just south of the confluence of the Gila and Salt Rivers, in Avondale, Arizona, about 14 miles (23 kilometers) southwest of downtown Phoenix.

The original marker was set in 1851 by John R. Bartlett. In 1934, the U.S. Coast and Geodetic Survey set triangulation station "INITIAL" approximately 15 feet from the initial point. Ty White, Associate Cadastral Engineer for the U.S. Bureau of Land Management (BLM), re-monumented the initial point on December 1, 1944. On April 24,1962, the monument was re-established by Leonard W. Murphy, based on the Ty White's field notes, because the previous monument had been vandalized. On April 26, 1984, Paul L. Reeves and John P. Bennet re-monumented the original corner. On February 19, 2006, the initial point was again re-monumented due to deterioration of the 1985 plaque. This re-monumentation was performed by staff from the BLM, members of the Arizona Professional Surveyors Society, and students at Phoenix College. The initial point was added to the National Register of Historic Places (listing #02001137) as of October 15, 2002. The plaque for that listing was installed as part of the 2006 re-monumenting.

For the 1984/2006 marker, handheld GPS units give a reading of 33° 22.631′ N latitude and 112° 18.366′ W longitude due to the specific geoid used. The angle between the 1984/2006 marker and the 1931 marker is at an azimuth bearing of 292°, a.k.a. 68° west of due north. The location is immediately east of Phoenix Raceway (formerly Phoenix International Raceway) and the western side of Monument Hill is terraced for low-priced race viewing.

== See also ==
- Baseline Road (Arizona)
- List of principal and guide meridians and base lines of the United States
