= Stark Street =

Street in Portland, Oregon, U.S.

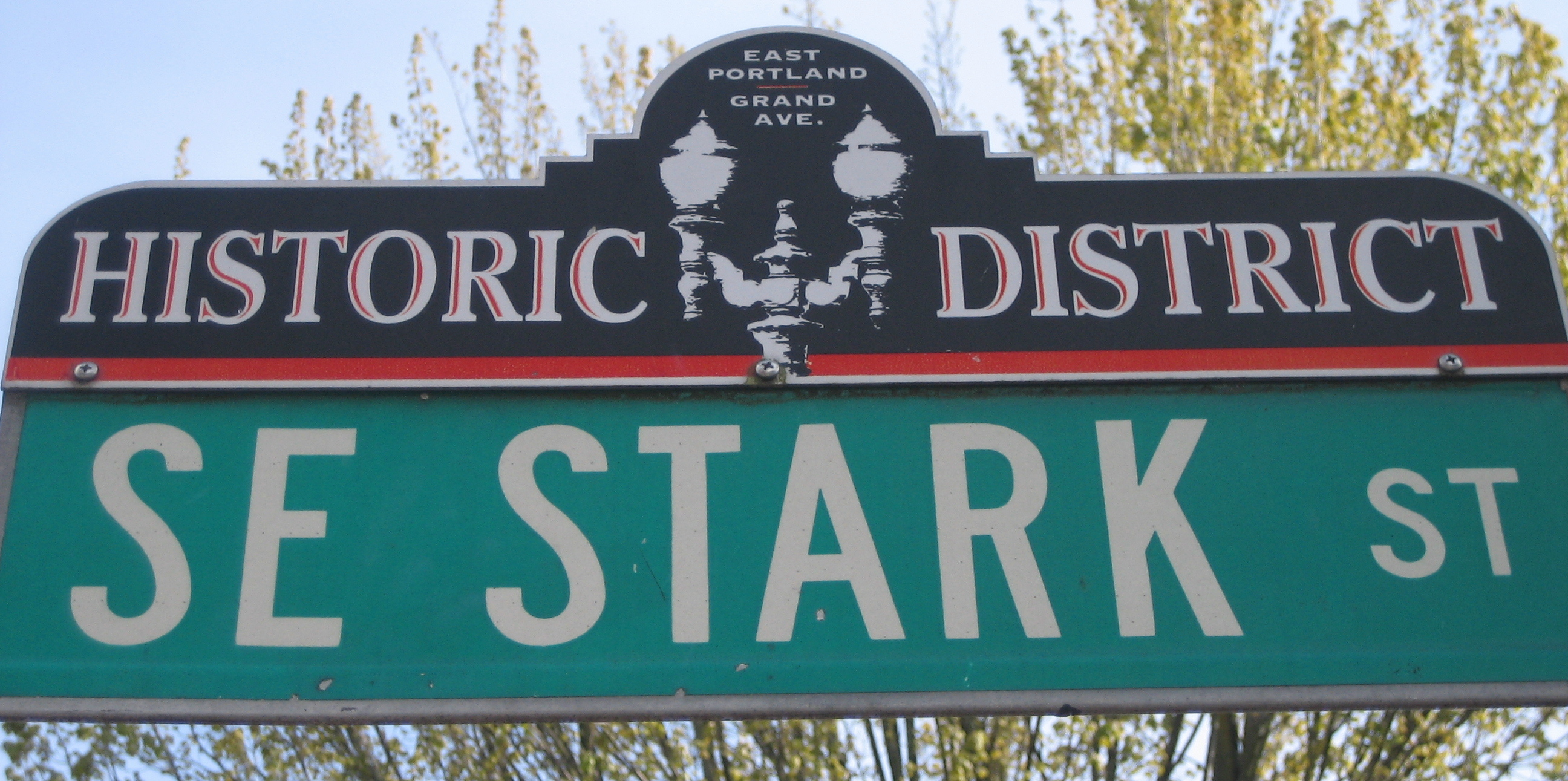
- Street sign in southeast Portland, Oregon, 2011
- Location: Portland, Oregon, U.S.

Stark Street, formerly known as Baseline Road, is an east-west-running street in Portland, Oregon, in the United States. The street is named after Benjamin Stark, and is divided as Southeast Stark Street and Southwest Stark Street by the Willamette River. All of Southwest Stark Street has been designated Southwest Harvey Milk Street to commemorate LGBTQ rights activist Harvey Milk.

On the east side of the Willamette River and in parts of Washington County, Stark Street follows the Willamette Baseline.

== History ==
In late 2017, activists proposed renaming Southwest Stark Street for gay rights activist Harvey Milk, noting a history of racism and support of slavery by Stark. In June 2018, the city council approved renaming the 13-block stretch of Stark from Southwest 11th Street and Southwest Naito Parkway within Downtown Portland as Southwest Harvey Milk Street. The name change took effect immediately upon the council's approval of the ordinance enacting it.

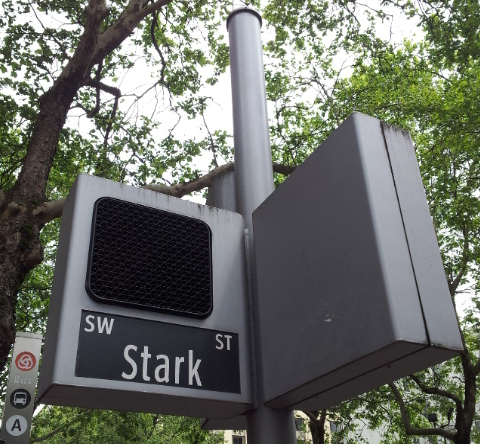
Street sign in southwest Portland, 2013

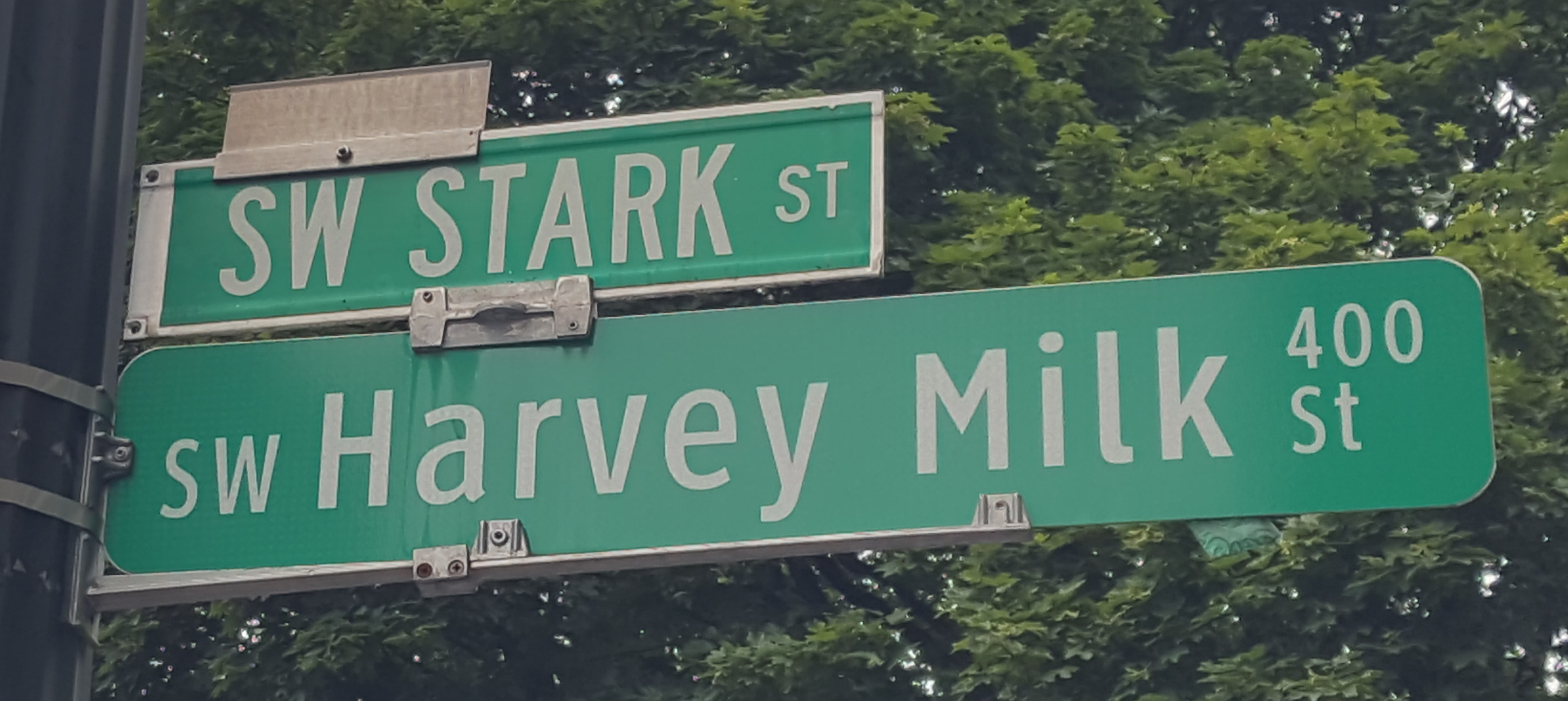
Street signs for both Southwest Stark Street and Southwest Harvey Milk Street, 2022

== See also ==
- LGBTQ culture in Portland, Oregon
- Historic ferries in Oregon § Portland
