= Pierce Mountain (Washington) =

Mountain in Washington (state), United States

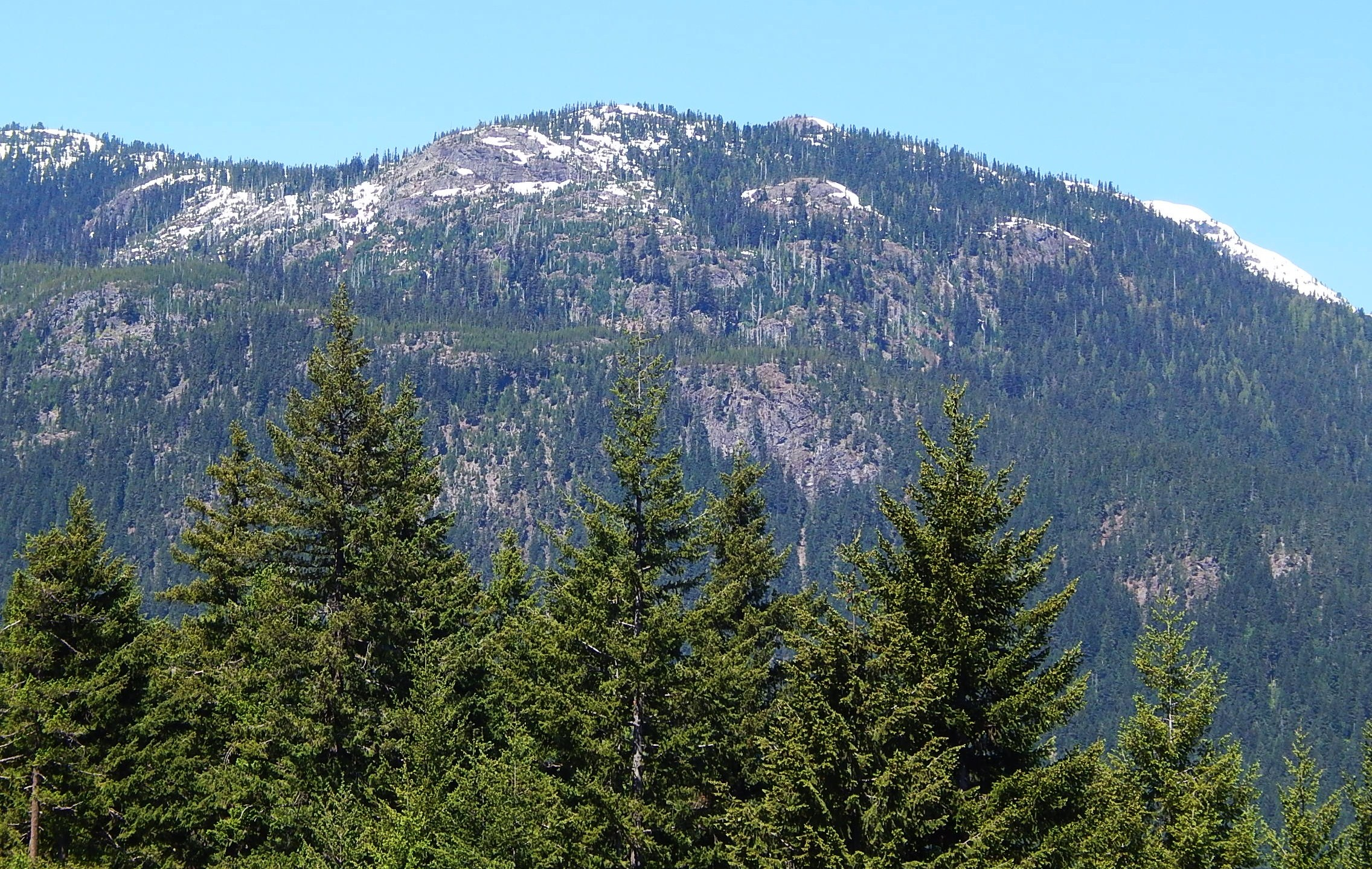
- Pierce Mountain, southeast side

Highest point
- Elevation: 4,973 ft (1,516 m)
- Prominence: 133 ft (41 m)
- Coordinates: 48°44′54″N 121°04′57″W

Geography
- Location within Washington (state) Location within the United States
- Interactive map of Pierce Mountain
- Country: United States
- State: Washington
- County: Whatcom
- Protected area: North Cascades National Park
- Parent range: North Cascades
- Topo map: USGS Ross Dam

Geology
- Rock type: gneiss

Climbing
- Easiest route: Hiking trail

Pierce Mountain is a 4,973-foot (1,516-metre) summit in the North Cascades of Washington, United States. It is located within North Cascades National Park and Stephen Mather Wilderness. It is situated above Ross Dam, at the eastern culmination of Sourdough Mountain. Like many North Cascade peaks, Pierce Mountain is more notable for its large, steep rise above local terrain than for its absolute elevation. Precipitation runoff from the mountain drains into the Skagit River via Pierce Creek and Ross Lake.

== Climate ==
Pierce Mountain is located in the marine west coast climate zone of western North America. Weather fronts originating in the Pacific Ocean travel east toward the Cascade Mountains. As fronts approach the North Cascades, they are forced upward by the peaks of the Cascade Range (orographic lift), causing them to drop their moisture in the form of rain or snow onto the Cascades. As a result, the west side of the North Cascades experiences high precipitation, especially during the winter months in the form of snowfall. Because of maritime influence, snow tends to be wet and heavy, resulting in avalanche danger. During winter months, weather is usually cloudy, but due to high pressure systems over the Pacific Ocean that intensify during summer months, there is often little or no cloud cover during the summer.

== Geology ==
The North Cascades features some of the most rugged topography in the Cascade Range with craggy peaks, ridges, and deep glacial valleys. Geological events occurring many years ago created the diverse topography and drastic elevation changes over the Cascade Range leading to the various climate differences. These climate differences lead to vegetation variety defining the ecoregions in this area.

The history of the formation of the Cascade Mountains dates back millions of years ago to the late Eocene Epoch. With the North American Plate overriding the Pacific Plate, episodes of volcanic igneous activity persisted. In addition, small fragments of the oceanic and continental lithosphere called terranes created the North Cascades about 50 million years ago.

During the Pleistocene period dating back over two million years ago, glaciation advancing and retreating repeatedly scoured the landscape leaving deposits of rock debris. The U-shaped cross section of the river valleys is a result of recent glaciation. Uplift and faulting in combination with glaciation have been the dominant processes which have created the tall peaks and deep valleys of the North Cascades area.

== Gallery ==
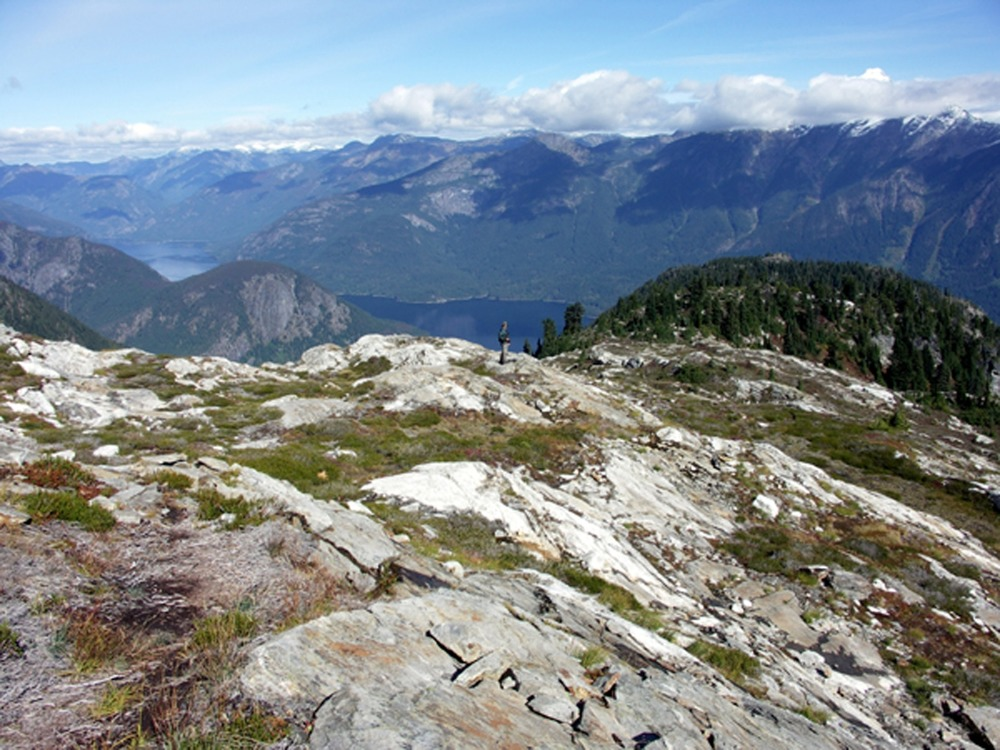
The Pierce Mountain Trail offers beautiful views of the North Cascades
