= Choctaw meridian =

Meridian used for land surveys in central Mississippi, USA

Coordinates: 31°52′29″N 90°14′42″W

In United States land surveying, the Choctaw meridian is a meridian that governs the surveys in most of central Mississippi. It begins on the Choctaw baseline, latitude 31° 54' 40" north, longitude 90° 14' 45" west from Greenwich and runs north to the south boundary of the Chickasaw cession, at latitude 34° 19' 40" north. The surveys of Mississippi by the United States General Land Office begun in 1831 "used the 'Old Choctaw Line' as the 'base meridian' of their efforts to transform the landscape from a landscape of imperial violence to a field of national development." It is named for the Choctaw Native Americans, indigenous to what is now Mississippi and Alabama.

== See also ==
- List of principal and guide meridians and base lines of the United States
