= Initial point =

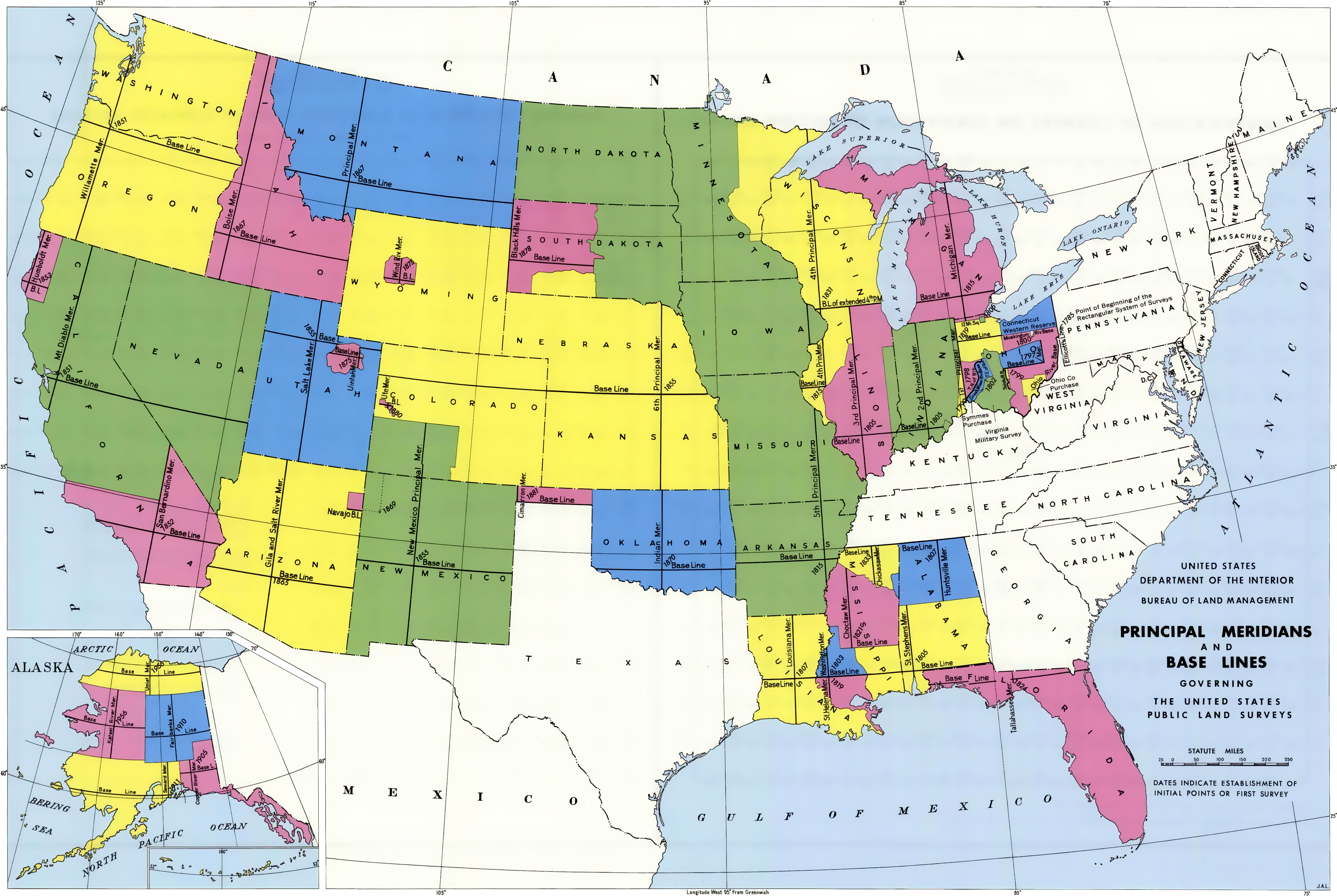
A U.S. Bureau of Land Management map showing all of the principal meridians and baselines in the U.S. Public Land Survey System

In surveying, an initial point is a datum (a specific point on the surface of the earth) that marks the beginning point for a cadastral survey. The initial point establishes a local geographic coordinate system for the surveys that refer to that point.

An initial point is defined by the intersection of a principal meridian and a base line.

== Selection of initial points ==
An example of cadastral survey starting at the initial point

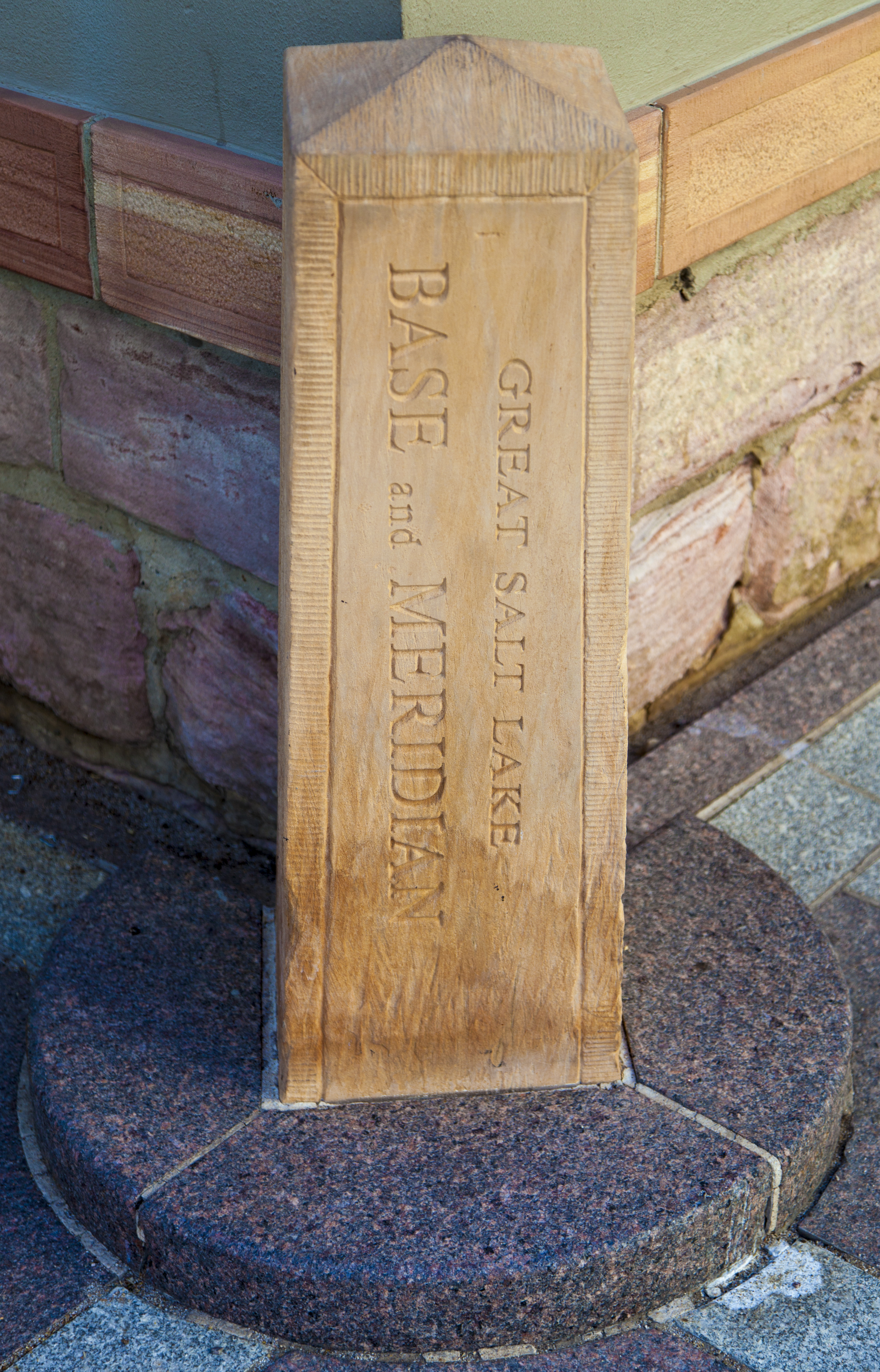
Initial point marker for Utah, located at the southeast corner of Temple Square in Salt Lake City.

A principal meridian and base line are usually established based on a preselected initial point, often some distinct geographical feature. As an example, the first established initial point in California was the Mount Diablo meridian. It was chosen because the summit of Mount Diablo could be seen for many miles around and could be referenced for surveys.

In other cases, a meridian and a base line were chosen separately based on other geographical features. For example, the Fifth principal meridian in the new Louisiana Purchase was established in 1815, with its southern end based on the confluence of the Arkansas and Mississippi Rivers, and extended northward from that point. The eastern end of the base line was chosen as the confluence of the St. Francis and Mississippi Rivers and extended westward. The initial point would be established where the meridian and the base line crossed, which turned out to be in the middle of a swamp in eastern Arkansas. This point is now located in the Louisiana Purchase State Park.

Some initial points were chosen based on existing markers. The initial point for the Gila and Salt River meridian was established based on an existing marker that had been set up in 1851 to mark a point on the Mexico–United States border before the Gadsden Purchase.

Many of the initial points in the United States have been listed on the National Register of Historic Places.

Notable initial points include:

- Beginning Point of the U.S. Public Land Survey
- Initial Point (Oklahoma)
- Initial Point of Boundary Between U.S. and Mexico, California
- Initial Point of the Gila and Salt River Base Line and Meridian, Arizona
- Mason and Dixon Survey Terminal Point, West Virginia

== See also ==
- Public Land Survey System
- List of principal and guide meridians and base lines of the United States
