= Survey township =

Area of land used in US land surveys

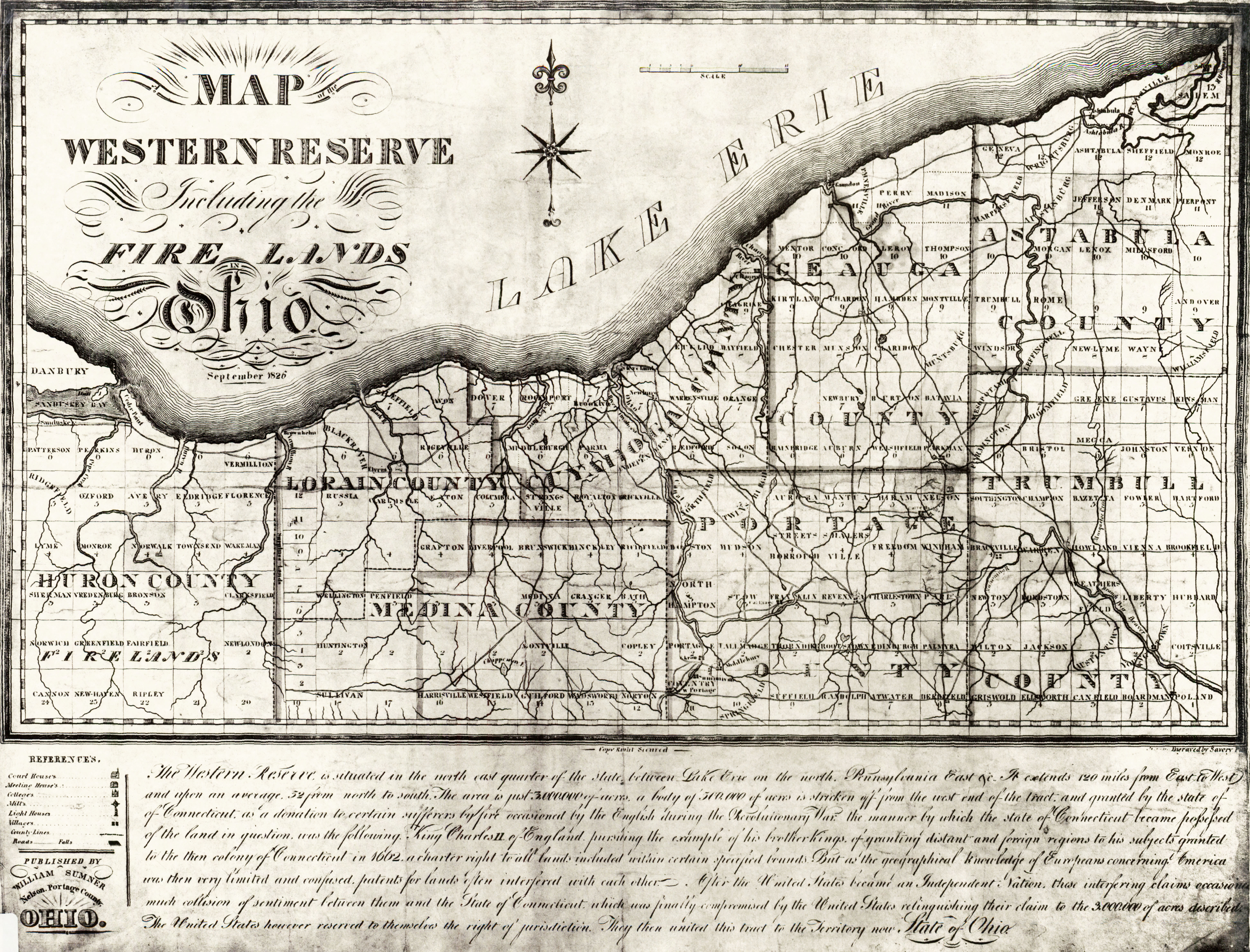
1826 map of the Connecticut Western Reserve in northern Ohio showing both survey and civil townships. The survey townships are represented by the numbers (horizontal "town" and vertical "range" numbers), and the civil townships using the same boundaries are represented by the names.

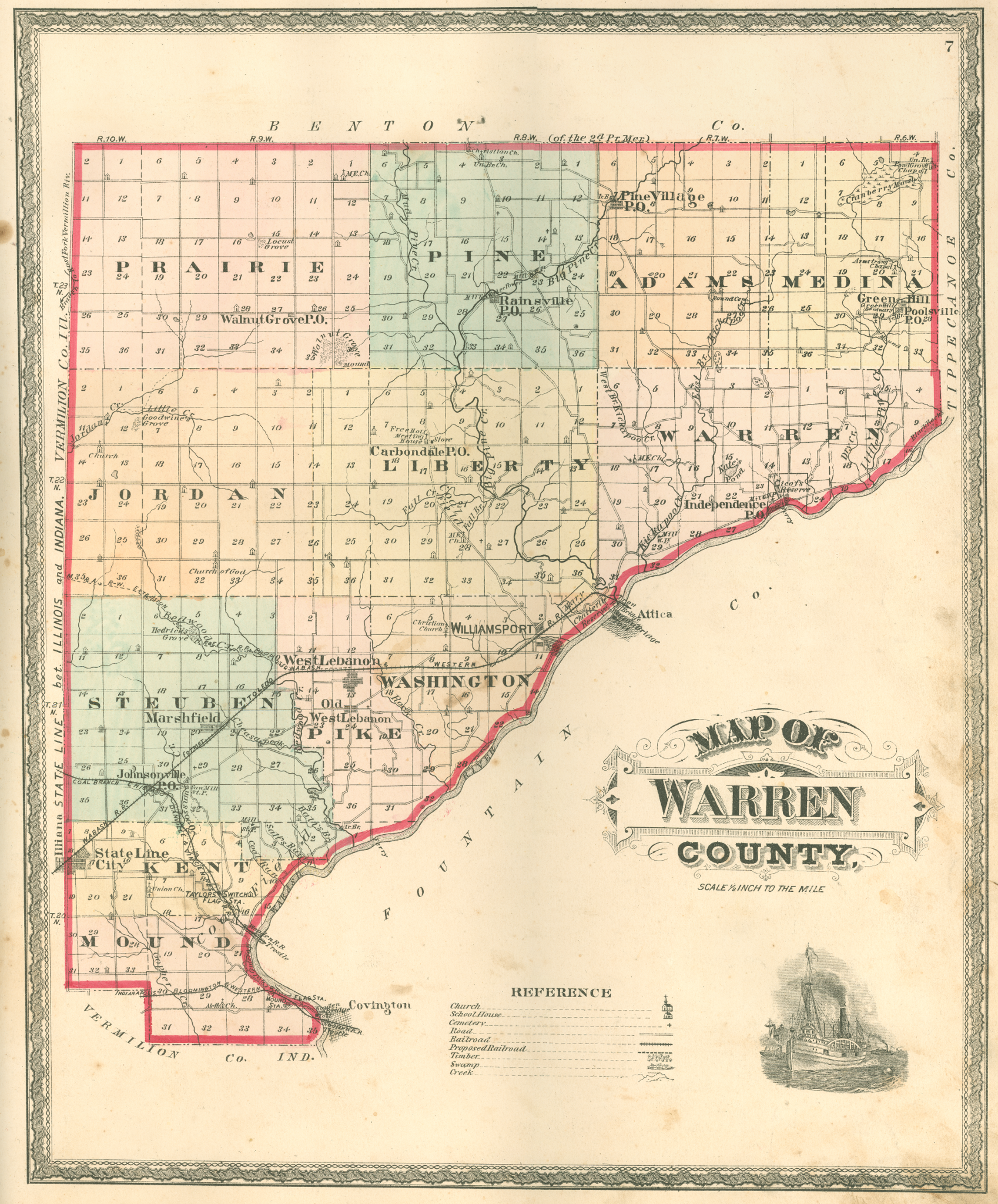
1877 map of Warren County, Indiana. Of the civil townships shown on this map, only Pine Township in the north exactly matches a survey township with 36 sections.

A survey township, sometimes called a Congressional township or just township, as used by the United States Public Land Survey System and by Canada's Dominion Land Survey is a nominally-square area of land that is nominally six survey miles (about 9.66 km) on a side. Each 36-square-mile (about 93.2 km^{2}) township is divided into 36 sections of one square mile (640 acres, roughly 2.6 km^{2}) each. The sections can be further subdivided for sale.

The townships are referenced by a numbering system that locates the township in relation to a principal meridian (north-south) and a base line (east-west). For example, Township 2 North, Range 4 East is the 4th township east of the principal meridian and the 2nd township north of the base line.

== History in the US ==
Standardized township (exterior) lines were originally surveyed and platted by the United States General Land Office in 1787 as part of the Seven Ranges survey of the initial portion of the "Territory Northwest of the River Ohio." Later survey crews subdivided the townships into section (interior) lines. Virtually all lands covered by this system were sold according to those boundaries and are marked on the U.S. Geological Survey topographic maps.

Prior to standardization, some of the Ohio Lands (the United States Military District, the Firelands and the Connecticut Western Reserve) were surveyed into townships of 5 miles (8.0 km) on each side. These are often known as Congressional Townships.

Sections are divided into quarter-sections of 160 acres (65 ha) each and quarter-quarter sections of 40 acres (16 ha) each. In the Homestead Act of 1862, one quarter-section of land was the amount allocated to each settler. Stemming from that are the idiomatic expressions, "the lower 40", the 40 acres on a settler's land that is lowest in elevation, in the direction towards which water drains toward a stream, and the "back forty", the portion farthest from the settler's dwelling.

== History in Canada ==
In western Canada, the Dominion Land Survey begun in 1871 adopted a similar format for survey townships, which do not form administrative units. These townships also have an area of approximately 36 square miles (six miles by six miles).

These townships include road allowances, so their nominal dimensions are a bit longer than six miles. In the first and second phases of the survey (Manitoba and parts of Saskatchewan), townships are nominally 489 chains (6.11 mi; 9.84 km) east-west and north-south. In the third phase of the survey (British Columbia, Alberta and most of Saskatchewan), townships are nominally 486 chains (6.08 mi; 9.78 km) east-west and 483 chains (6.04 mi; 9.72 km) north-south. The actual area of a given township differs from the nominal because of systematic effects (due to the design of the survey) and surveying errors.

== Survey township vs. civil township ==
Survey townships are distinct from civil townships. A survey township is used to establish boundaries for land ownership, while a civil township is a form of local government. In states with civil townships, the two types of townships often coincide. County lines, especially in western states, usually follow survey township lines, leading to the large number of rectangular counties in the Midwest, which are agglomerations of survey townships.

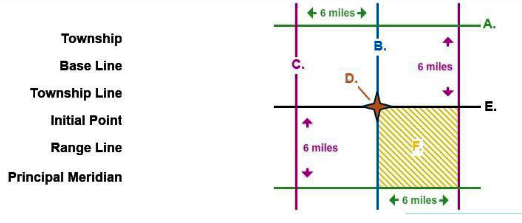
Survey township: A. Township Line, B. Principal Meridian, C. Range Line, D. Initial Point, E. Base Line, and F. Township, according to BLM

== See also ==
- Township
- Township (United States)
- Charter township (Michigan)
- Paper township (Ohio)
