= Baseline (surveying) =

Line between two points on the Earth's surface

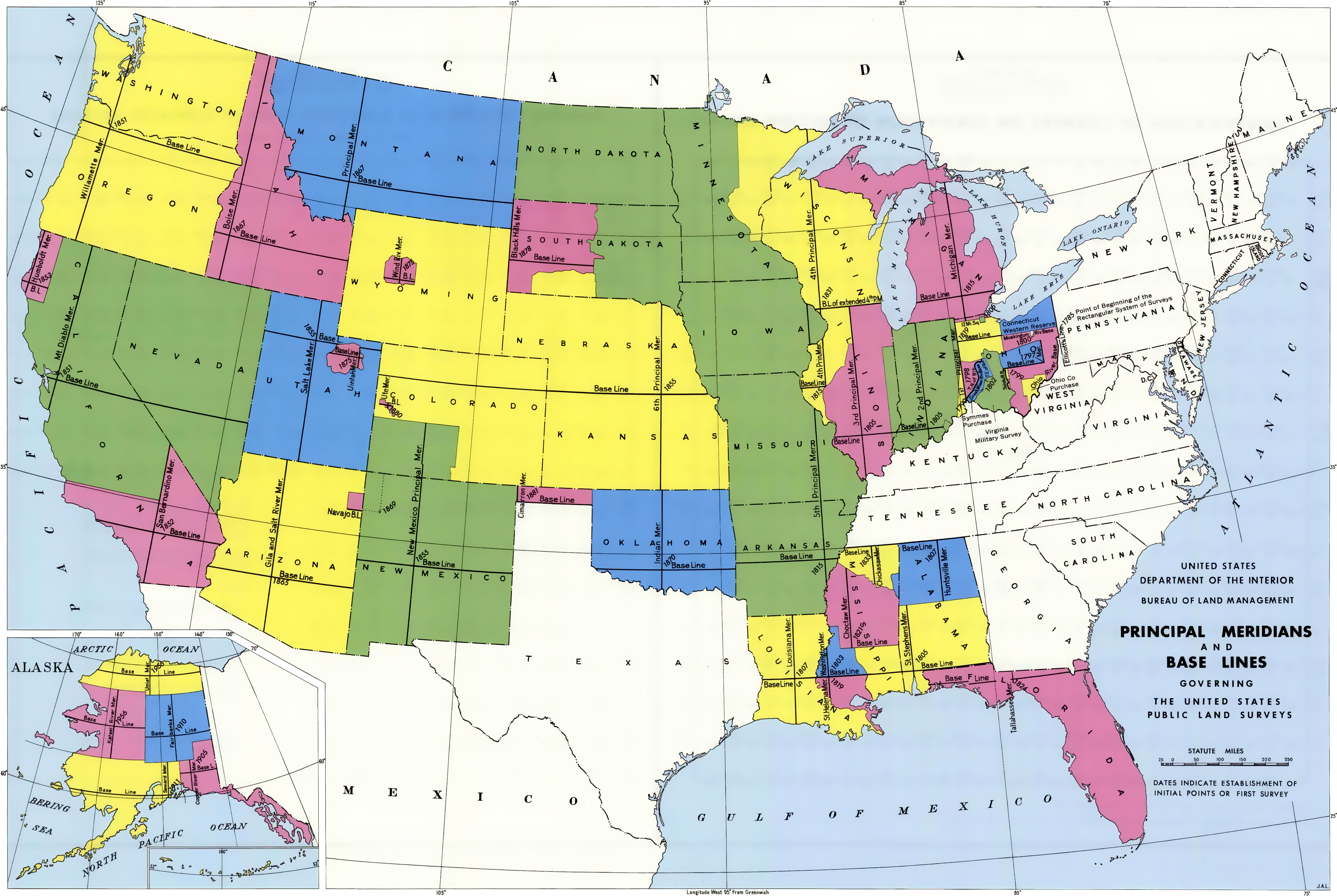
This BLM map depicts the principal meridians and baselines used in the survey of the United States.

In surveying, a baseline is generally a line between two points on the Earth's surface and the direction and/or distance between them.

In a triangulation network, at least one distance between two stations needs to be measured to calculate the size of the triangles by trigonometry.

In relative Global Navigation Satellite System (GNSS) surveying, a baseline is the line between two GNSS receivers to determine the 3D coordinate difference.

== United States ==
In the United States Public Land Survey System, a baseline is specifically the principal east-west line (i.e., a parallel) upon which all rectangular surveys in a defined area are based. The baseline meets its corresponding principal meridian (north-south line) at the point of origin, or initial point, for the land survey. For example, the baseline for Nebraska and Kansas is shared as the border for both states, at the 40th parallel north.

More specifically a baseline may be the line that divides a survey township between north and south.

=== "Baseline Road" ===
Many communities in the United States have roads that run along survey baselines, many of which are named to reflect that fact. Some examples:

- In Huntsville, Alabama, Meridian Street (originally called Base Line Road) and a portion of US 231/US 431 follow the Huntsville meridian from the US 72 interchange to the Flint River north of Meridianville, the latter of which is named for the meridian itself.
- In Little Rock, Arkansas, Baseline Road follows the baseline used by surveyors of the Louisiana Purchase.
- In Colorado, Baseline Road in Boulder marks the 40th parallel, or the western extension of the Kansas-Nebraska boundary, which is also the boundary between Adams and Weld counties.
- In Arizona, the baseline near the Phoenix metro area is marked by Baseline Road.
- In Southern California, from Highland to San Dimas, the baseline is marked by Baseline Road.
- In Michigan, the baseline for the Michigan Survey forms the boundary between the second and third tiers of counties and in many portions, discontinuous segments of road along the baseline are known as "Baseline Road." 8 Mile Road in the Detroit area runs along the Michigan Baseline and was formerly known as "Baseline Road."
- Baseline Road in Hillsboro, Oregon, generally follows the Willamette Baseline which intersects the Willamette Meridian at the Willamette Stone State Park.
- Base Line Road in Roseville California, was known as "Base Line Road" until the City (incorrectly at the time) named the section of road within their incorporated area, "Baseline Road". They petitioned the County for a name change, and the spelling was changed effective 11/20/17

== Canada ==
In Canadian land surveying, a base line is one of the many principal east-west lines that correspond to four tiers of townships (two tiers north and two south). The base lines are about 24 miles (39 km) apart, with the first base line at the 49th parallel, the western Canada–US border. It is, therefore equivalent to the standard parallel in the US system.

=== Ontario ===
In Ontario, a baseline forms a straight line parallel a geographical feature (mostly a lake, especially Lake Ontario or Lake Erie) that serves as a reference line for surveying a grid of property lots. The result of this surveying is the concession road and sideline system in use today.

Many prominent Ontario baselines lie on the surveyed boundaries of land treaties signed with First Nations peoples. For example, several baselines in Waterloo Region and Brant County (including Wilmot Line, Brant-Oxford Road, and Indian Line) follow the borders of the Haldimant Tract land grant to the Six Nations confederacy, leading to the patchwork road and lot network, surveyed parallel to the western edge of the tract, which can be seen in this area to this day. Jones Baseline which runs through Wellington County and Halton Region follows the original survey route marked by Augustus Jones after the Between the Lakes Purchase in 1792.

== See also ==
- Public Land Survey System (United States)
  - List of principal and guide meridians and base lines of the United States
- Dominion Land Survey (Canada)
- Survey township
- Decumanus Maximus
- Principal meridian
- Borden Base Line
- Braak Base Line (Germany)
