= Principal meridian =

Land surveying reference point

A principal meridian is a meridian used for survey control in a large region.

== Canada ==
The Dominion Land Survey of Western Canada took its origin at the First (or Principal) Meridian, located at 97°27′28.41″ west of Greenwich, just west of Winnipeg, Manitoba. This line is exactly ten miles west of the Red River at the Canada–United States border.

Six other meridians were designated at four-degree intervals westward, with the seventh located in British Columbia; the second and fourth meridians form the general eastern border and the western border of Saskatchewan.

== United States ==
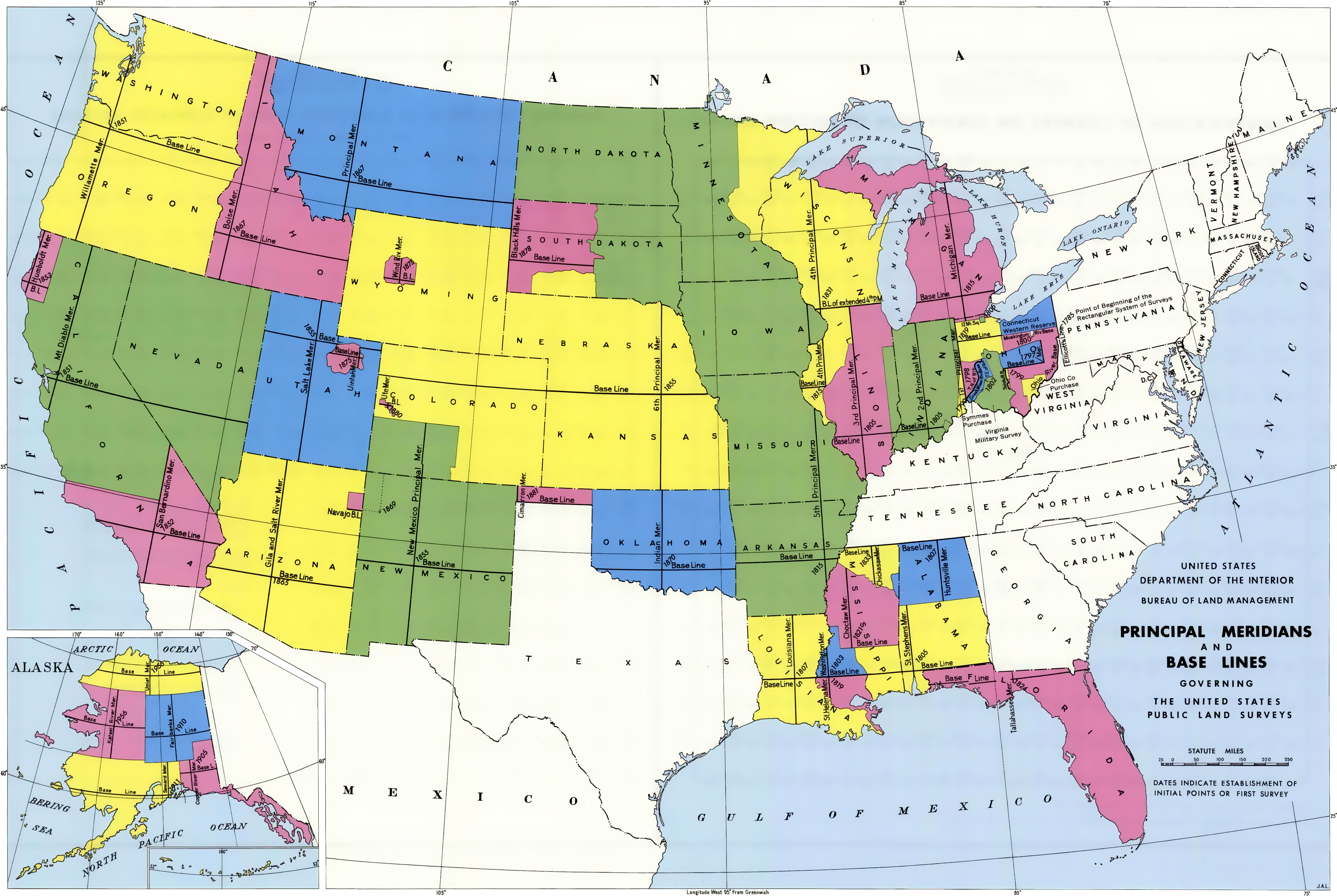
This BLM map depicts the principal meridians and baselines used for surveying states (colored) in the PLSS.

In the United States Public Land Survey System, a principal meridian is the principal north–south line used for survey control in a large region, and which divides townships between east and west. The meridian meets its corresponding baseline at the point of origin, or initial point, for the land survey. For example, the Mount Diablo Meridian, used for surveys in California and Nevada, runs north–south through the summit of Mount Diablo.

Often, meridians are marked with roads, such as the Meridian Avenue in San Jose, California, Meridian Road in Vacaville, California, both on the Mount Diablo Meridian, Meridian Road in Wichita, Kansas on the Sixth Principal Meridian, and Meridian Avenue in several western Washington counties generally following the Willamette Meridian. Baseline Road or Base Line Street extends for about 40 miles (64 km) from Highland, California east of San Bernardino to La Verne, California where it meets Foothill Boulevard.

== See also ==
- Cardo
- Baseline (surveying)
- List of principal and guide meridians and base lines of the United States
