= OKTXAR Corner =

OKTXAR Corner is a geographic point in the Red River marking the tripoint of the U.S. states of Oklahoma, Arkansas, and Texas. Unlike many other state tripoints, OKTXAR Corner does not have a monument and is located within the river channel, making it likely inaccessible by land. It can potentially be reached by boat, depending on water levels.

== Geography ==
The tripoint lies within the Red River, which forms part of the boundary between Texas and Oklahoma before curving into southwestern Arkansas. The approximate coordinates are 33°38′16″N 94°29′09″W, and the elevation is about 292 feet (89 m) above sea level. Seasonal changes in river flow can shift the exact location of the sandbanks where the corner is sometimes exposed.

== Historical Context ==
The Red River has long served as a natural boundary in the region. It was referenced in the Adams–Onís Treaty of 1819 as part of the border between the United States and Spanish Texas. The river also played a role in early trade routes and was the site of the Red River Campaign during the American Civil War.

Unlike other tripoints such as Texhomex (New Mexico–Oklahoma–Texas) or the OKKAMO Tri-State Marker (Arkansas–Missouri–Oklahoma), OKTXAR Corner remains unmarked due to its location in a dynamic river environment.

== Accessibility ==
There are no roads or trails leading to OKTXAR Corner. Access by land is considered impractical because of private property and dense riparian zones along the riverbanks. The most feasible approach is by watercraft during periods of low to moderate river flow.

== Significance ==
OKTXAR Corner is one of six state tripoints involving Oklahoma. While it lacks a monument, it is of interest to highpointers and geographic enthusiasts who seek out U.S. state boundary intersections.

== See also ==
- List of Oklahoma tri-points
- OKKAMO Tri-State Marker
- Preston Monument
- Texhomex
