= State marker =

State marker may refer to:

- Boundary marker between two or more states
  - Tripoint
  - Quadripoint
- State historical marker
- Survey marker
- Highway shield
- Welcome sign
- Biomarker, a marker for a particular biological state

== See also ==
- State (disambiguation)
- Interpretive sign
- List of tripoints
- List of tripoints of U.S. states
