= Site No. RH00-062 =

Survey monument in the United States

- U.S. National Register of Historic Places
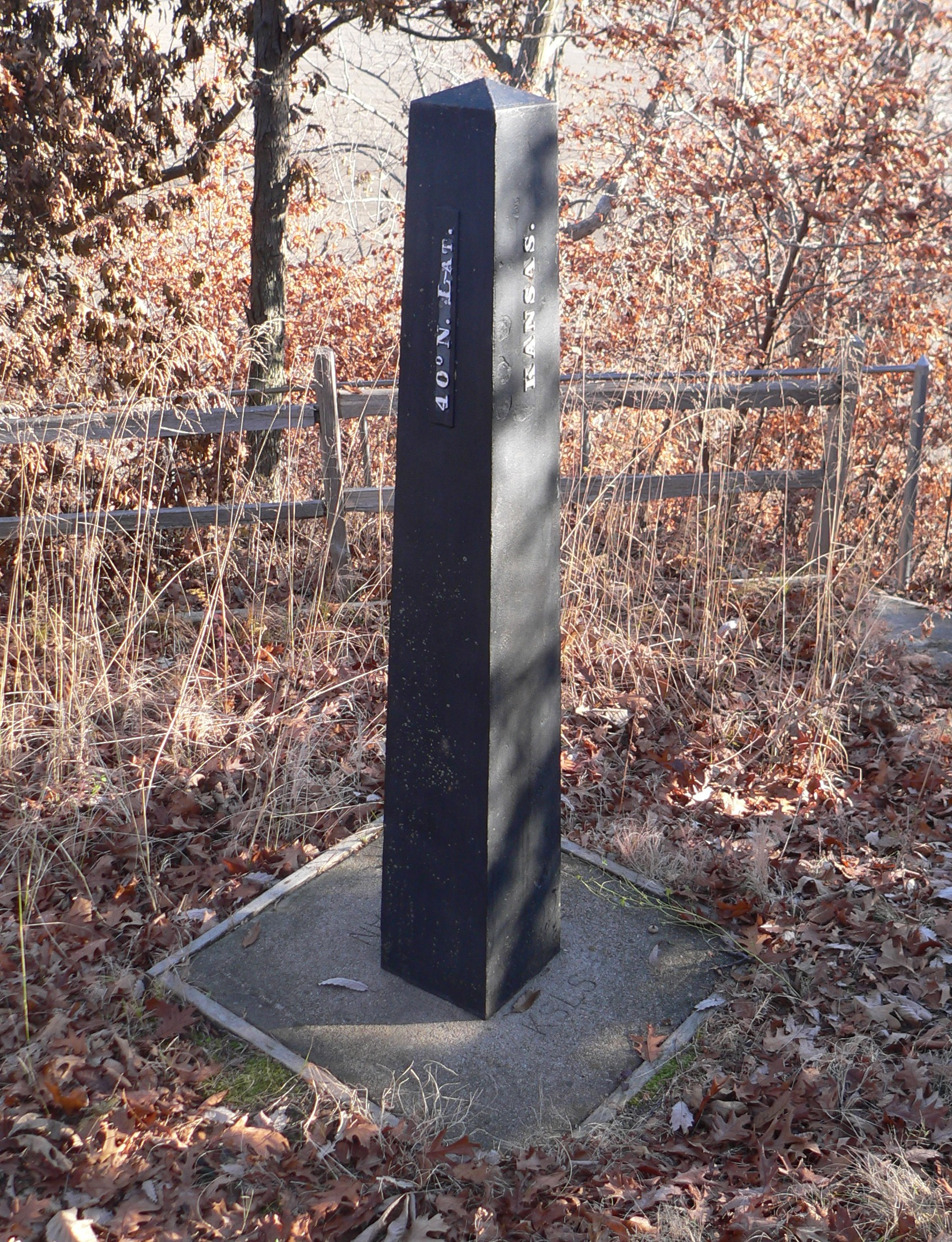

- Location within Nebraska Location within the United States
- Nearest city: Rulo, Nebraska
- Coordinates: 40°0′0″N 95°19′55″W
- Area: less than one acre
- Built: 1855
- MPS: Nebraska--Kansas Public Land Survey TR
- NRHP reference No.: 87001001
- Added to NRHP: June 19, 1987

Site No. RH00-062 is a survey monument located at the tripoint of Richardson County, Nebraska, and Brown and Doniphan counties in Kansas. The cast iron monument is 6 feet (1.8 m) tall and 16 inches (410 mm) square at its base. The monument marks the starting point of the land survey of the Kansas-Nebraska border along the 40th parallel north, which intersects the top of the Missouri River's western bluff at this spot. U.S. Deputy Surveyor Charles A. Manners erected the monument in 1855 at the beginning of the survey. In 1924, the monument was displaced and reset at the wrong location before Leo M. Petersen reset it in a sturdier base.

The monument was added to the National Register of Historic Places on June 19, 1987.

== See also ==
- OKKAMO Tri-State Marker: monument on the Arkansas-Missouri-Oklahoma tripoint
- Site No. JF00-072, the intersection of the 40th parallel north and the sixth principal meridian
