= Tri-States Monument =

Tripoint boundary monument for New Jersey, New York, and Pennsylvania

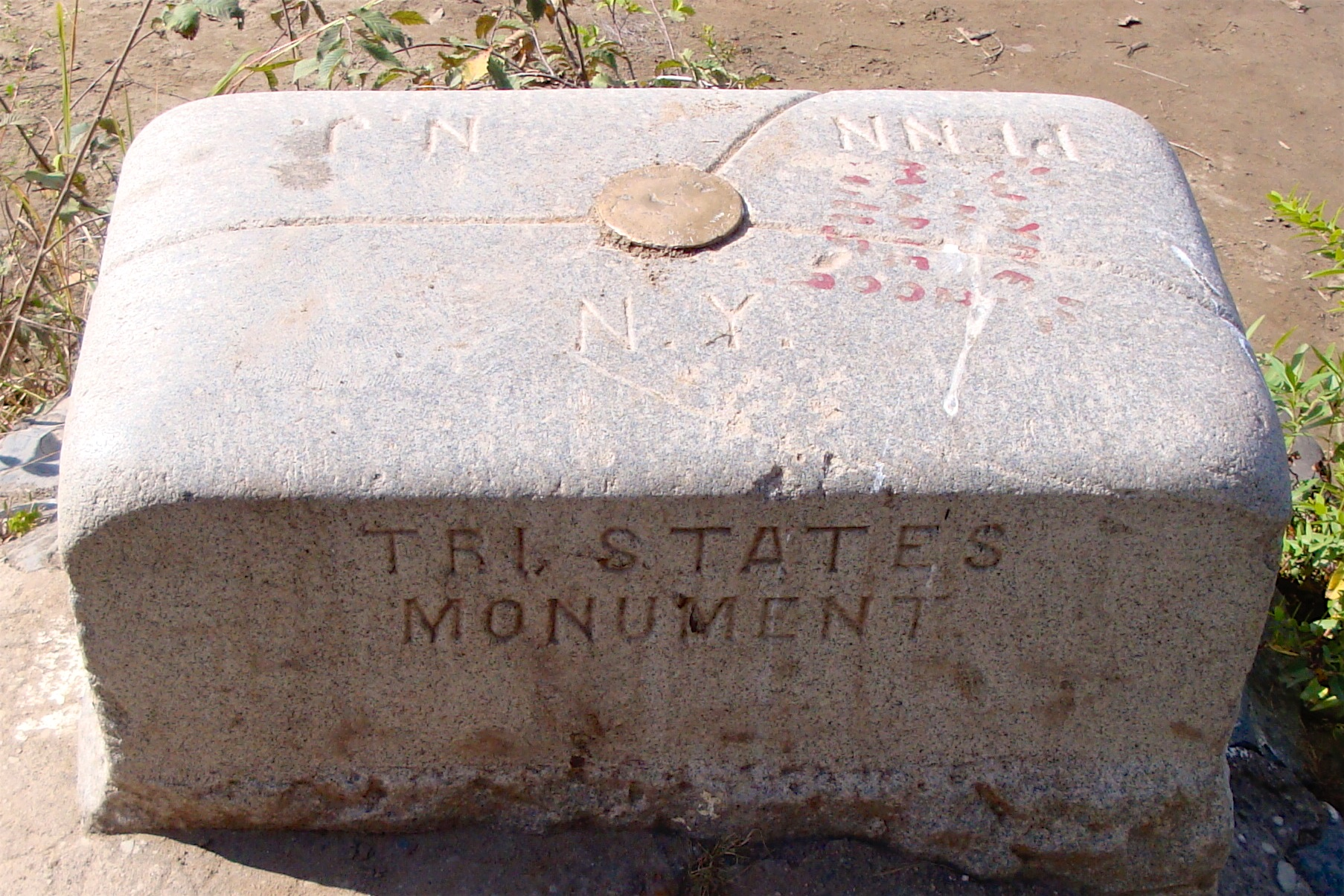
- Tri-States Monument, 2009
- Interactive map of Tri-States Monument
- Location: Tripoint for the states of New Jersey, New York, and Pennsylvania
- Coordinates: 41.35727°N 74.69472°W
- Material: Granite

The Tri-States Monument (also known as Tri-State Rock) is a granite monument that marks the tripoint of the state boundaries of New Jersey, New York, and Pennsylvania. It is at the northwestern end of the boundary between New Jersey and New York, the northern end of the boundary between New Jersey and Pennsylvania, and the eastern end of the boundary between New York and Pennsylvania. The monument is located at the confluence of the Delaware and Neversink rivers. This location is also known as Carpenter's Point.

The nearby Witness Monument, also known as the Reference Monument or the western State Line Monument, is a taller upright granite monument located south of the Laurel Grove Cemetery in Port Jervis, New York, and under a bridge for Interstate 84. It is not directly on any state boundary, but instead witnesses the location of two points: this tripoint and the corner boundary point between New York and Pennsylvania in the Delaware River.

The Supreme Court of the United States summarized the boundaries of these three states with respect to this monument in New Jersey v. New York, 283 U.S. 336 (1931):

... where it (the Delaware) forms a boundary between New York and Pennsylvania. The Delaware continues its course as such boundary to Tristate Rock, near Port Jervis in New York, at which point Pennsylvania and New York are met by New Jersey. From there the river marks the boundary between Pennsylvania and New Jersey until Pennsylvania stops at the Delaware state line, and from then on the river divides Delaware from New Jersey until it reaches the Atlantic between Cape Henlopen and Cape May.

Also, it is the northernmost point of New Jersey, in Montague Township, Sussex County.

== Background ==
Station Rock at latitude 41 degrees north on the Hudson River

In 1664, King Charles II of England granted his brother, James, the Duke of York, a Royal colony that covered what had been New Netherlands. Later in 1664, the Duke of York divided this area between the Hudson River and the Delaware River to Sir George Carteret and Lord Berkeley of Stratton. The western and northern border was:

along said River or Bay (the Delaware) to the northward as far as the northward most branch of the said Bay or River, which is in latitude 41 degrees, 40 minutes and crosseth over thence in a straight line to the latitude 41 degrees on Hudson's River: which said tract of land is hereafter to be called by the name of New Caeserea or New Jersey.

Station Rock marked the eastern end of the border at latitude 41 degrees on the Hudson River.

== History ==
In December 1872, the New Jersey Geological Survey had the State Geologist, George H. Cook, survey the boundary between New Jersey and New York. In 1874, the United States Coast Survey recovered the previous crow foot cut marking the station location and placed a lead-filled copper pipe in a deep hole drilled into the bedrock. In 1882, this copper bolt was replaced with a granite monument similar to the witness monument, but ice floes broke off the upper portion by the spring of 1883. The remaining monument was then reworked on May 21, 1885, to its current description.

Older United States Geological Survey (USGS) maps show the three states converging in the middle of the Delaware channel instead of at the monument. However, New York and Pennsylvania law describing the state boundary both explicitly refer to the monument as its eastern terminus. Since 1972, USGS maps reflecting the construction of Interstate 84, which crosses the two rivers just north of the monument, have shown the state lines meeting there.

== Description ==
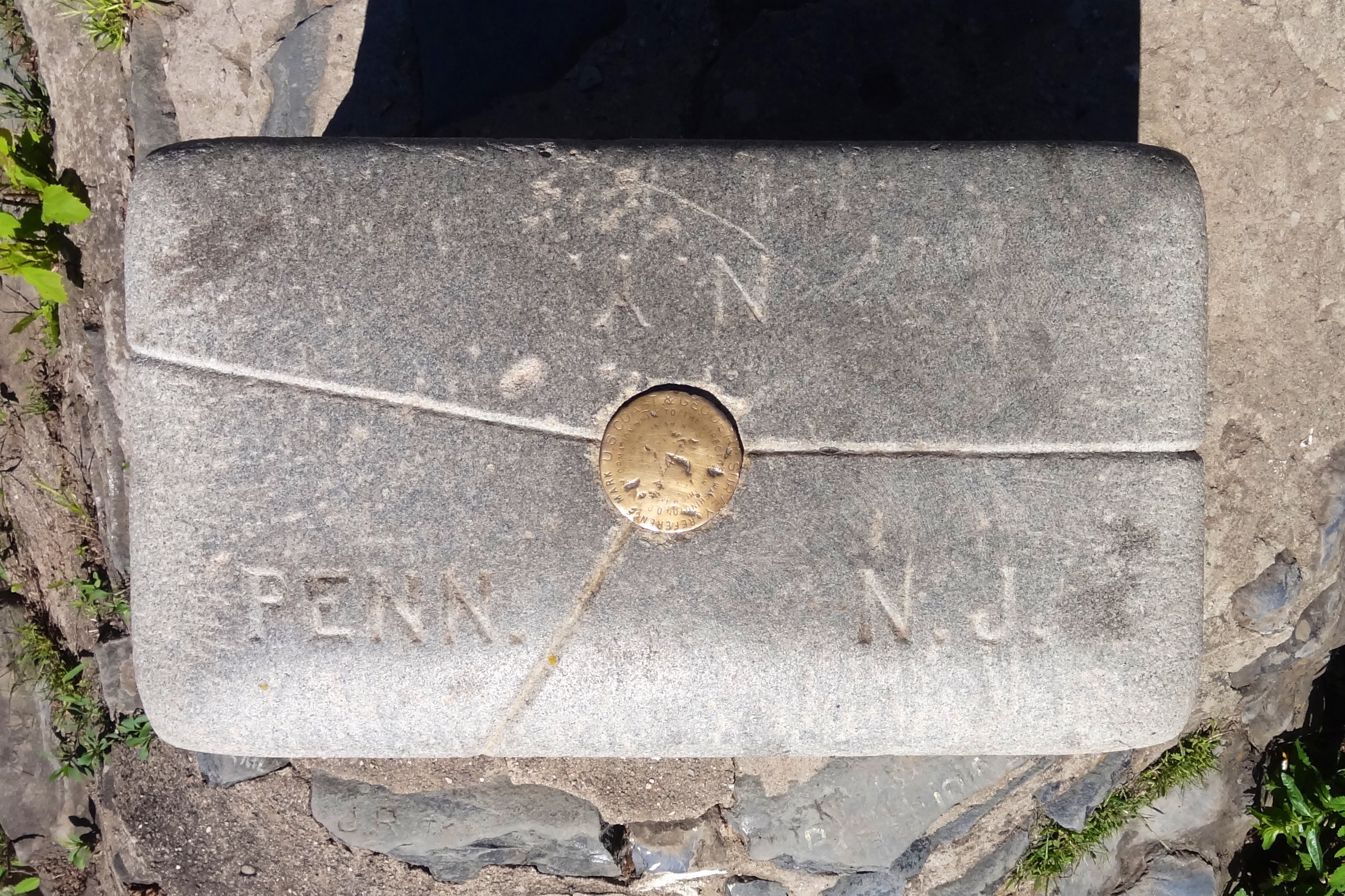
Top view of the Tri-States Monument

The Tri-States Monument is 2 feet 4 inches (71 cm) long, 1 foot 4 inches (41 cm) wide, and 1 foot 5 inches (43 cm) high above the bedrock. The top surface is engraved with the initials of the names of the three states and with grooves representing the state boundaries. "Tri States Monument" is engraved on the north side. It is by the water's edge near the high-water mark of the rivers. A bronze United States Coast and Geodetic Survey survey marker stamped LAUREL NO. 2 1942 was in the center of the top surface until 2013. It was a reference mark for the triangulation station, LAUREL, that was 25 feet (7.6 m) from the Witness Monument. Both were set in 1942.

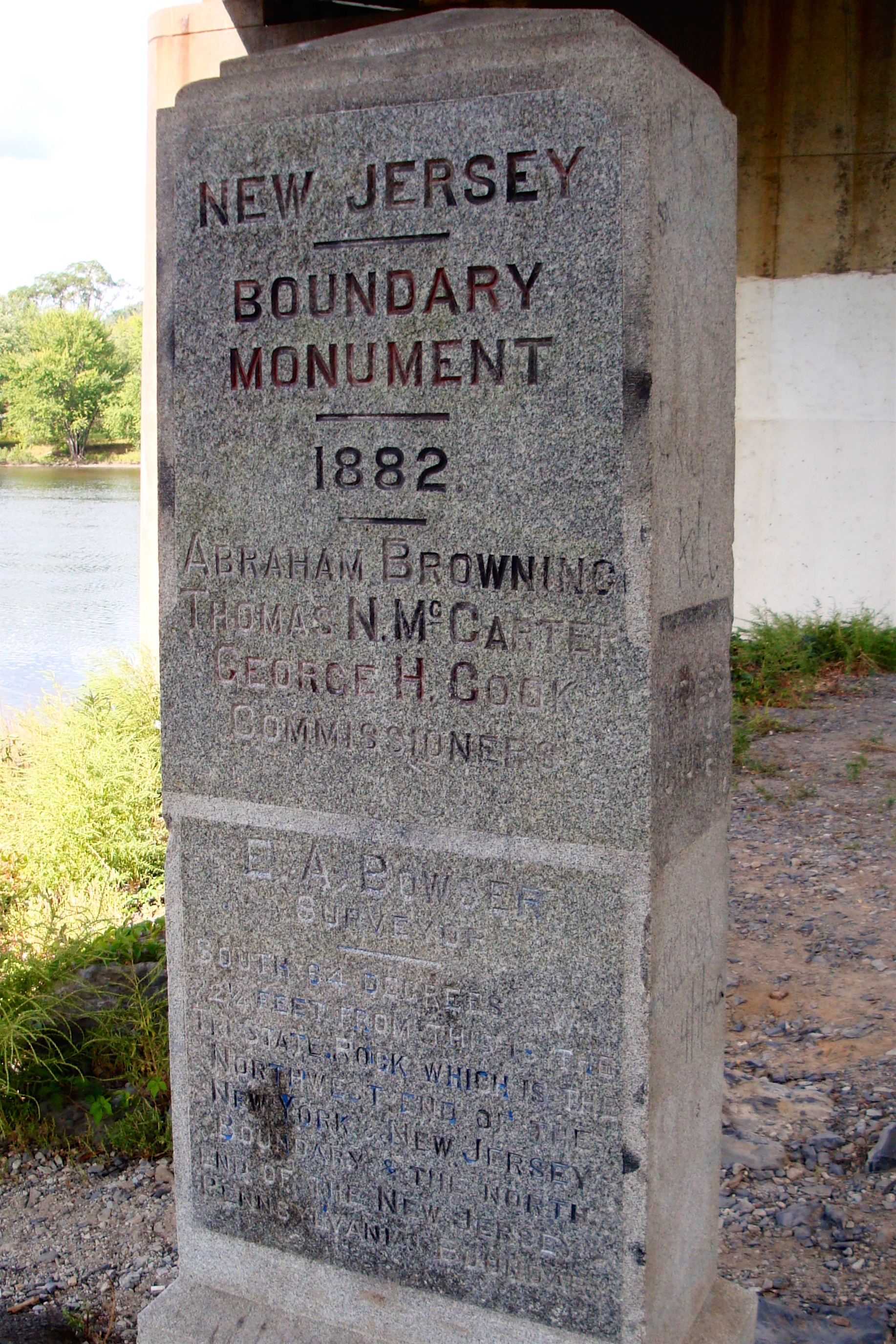
New Jersey side

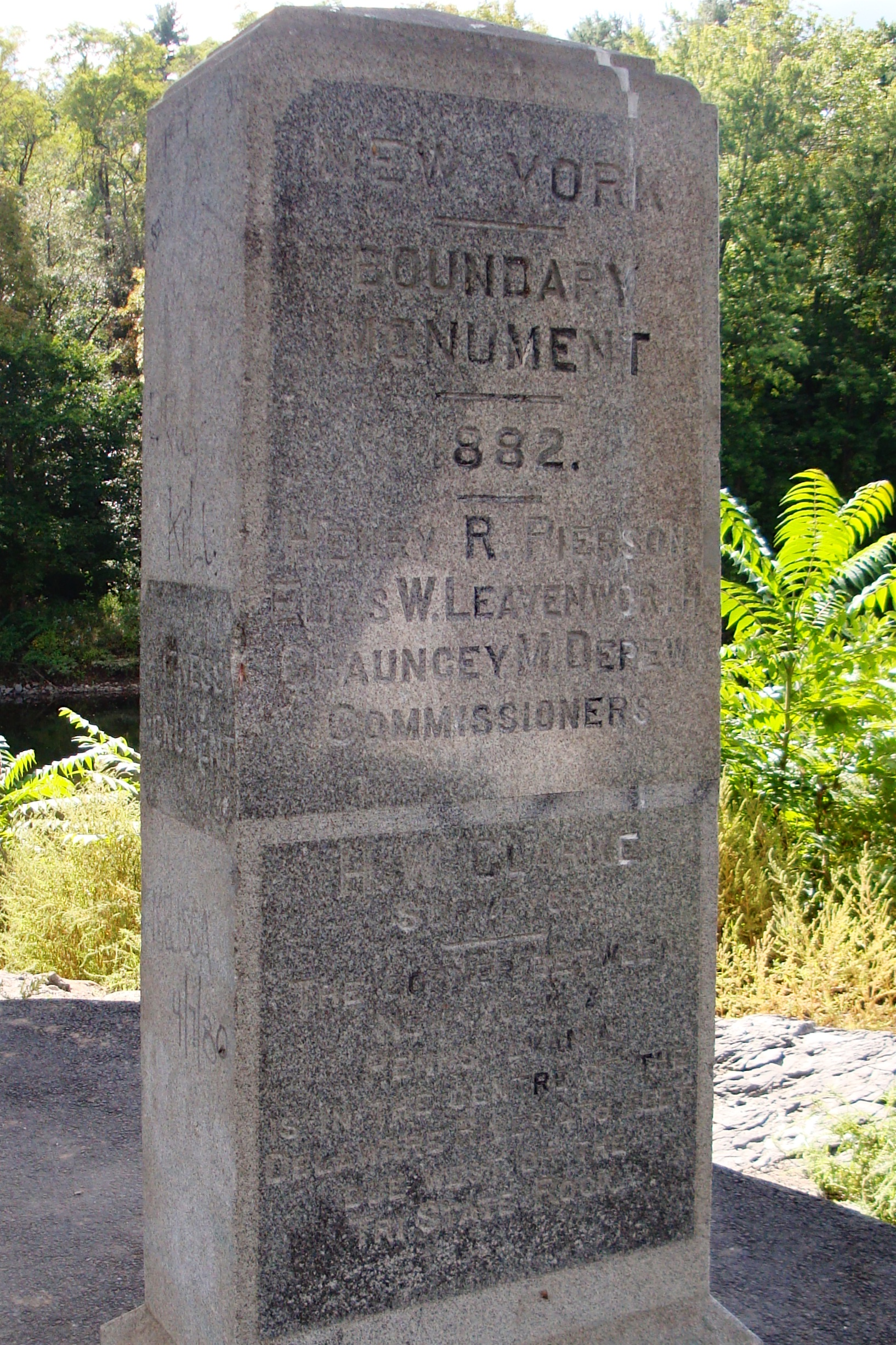
New York side

Witness Monument

The Witness Monument is inscribed "Boundary Monument" and dated 1882 on both sides. "Witness Monument" is engraved on the east side. The New Jersey (south) side details the location of the tripoint:

South 64 degrees W. 72 1/4 feet from this is the Tri State Rock which is the northwest end of the New York & New Jersey Boundary & the north end of the New Jersey & Pennsylvania Boundary.

It also lists the commissioners from New Jersey: Abraham Browning, Thomas N. McCarter, and George H. Cook; and surveyor Edward A. Bowser. The New York (north) side details the location of the corner boundary point between New York and Pennsylvania:

The corner between New York & Pennsylvania is in the centre of the Delaware River 475 feet due west of the Tri State Rock.

And lists the commissioners from New York: Henry R. Pierson, Chauncey M. Depew, Elias W. Leavenworth; and surveyor H. W. Clarke.

== Gallery ==
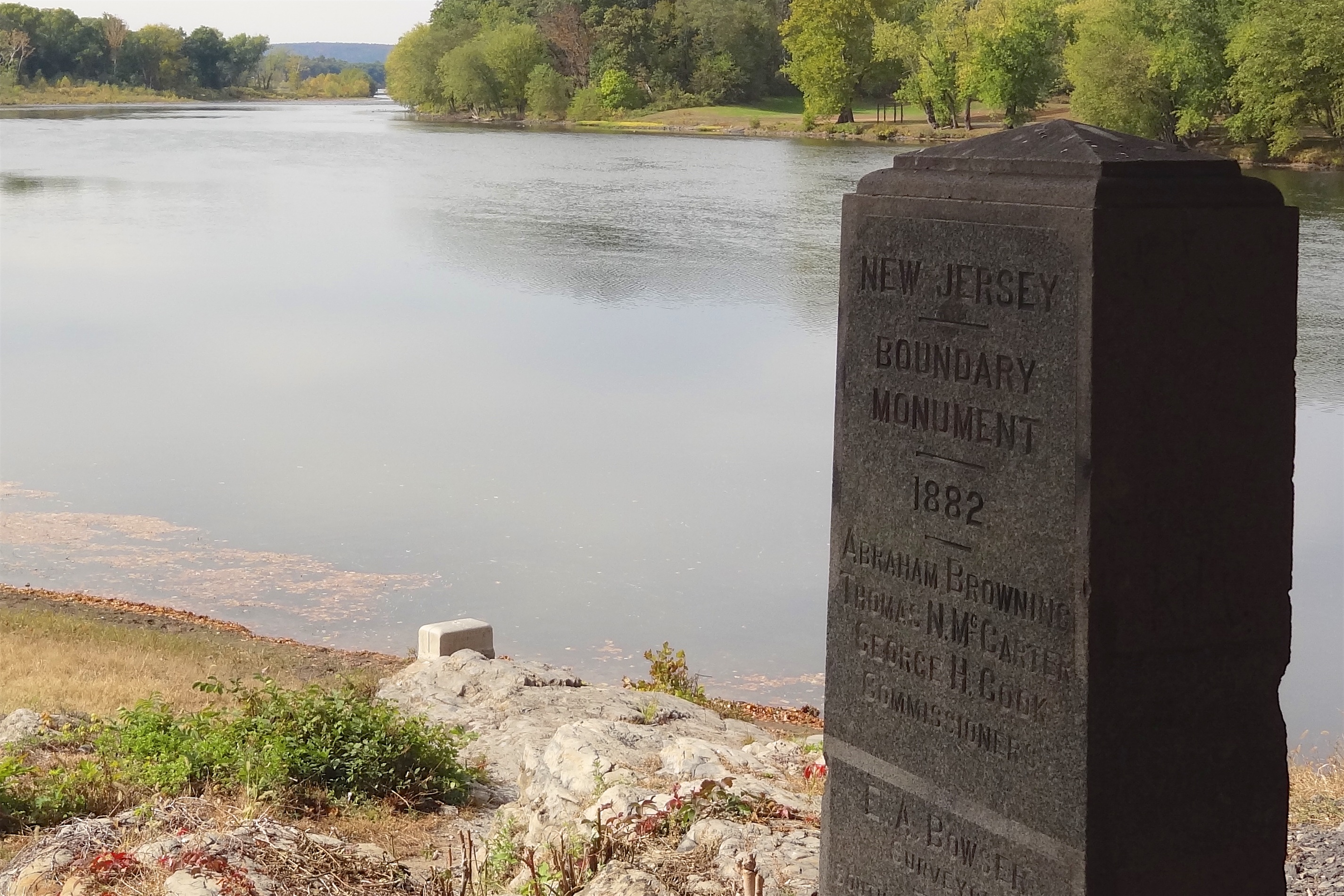
Overlooking the Tri-States Monument and the Delaware River from the Witness Monument

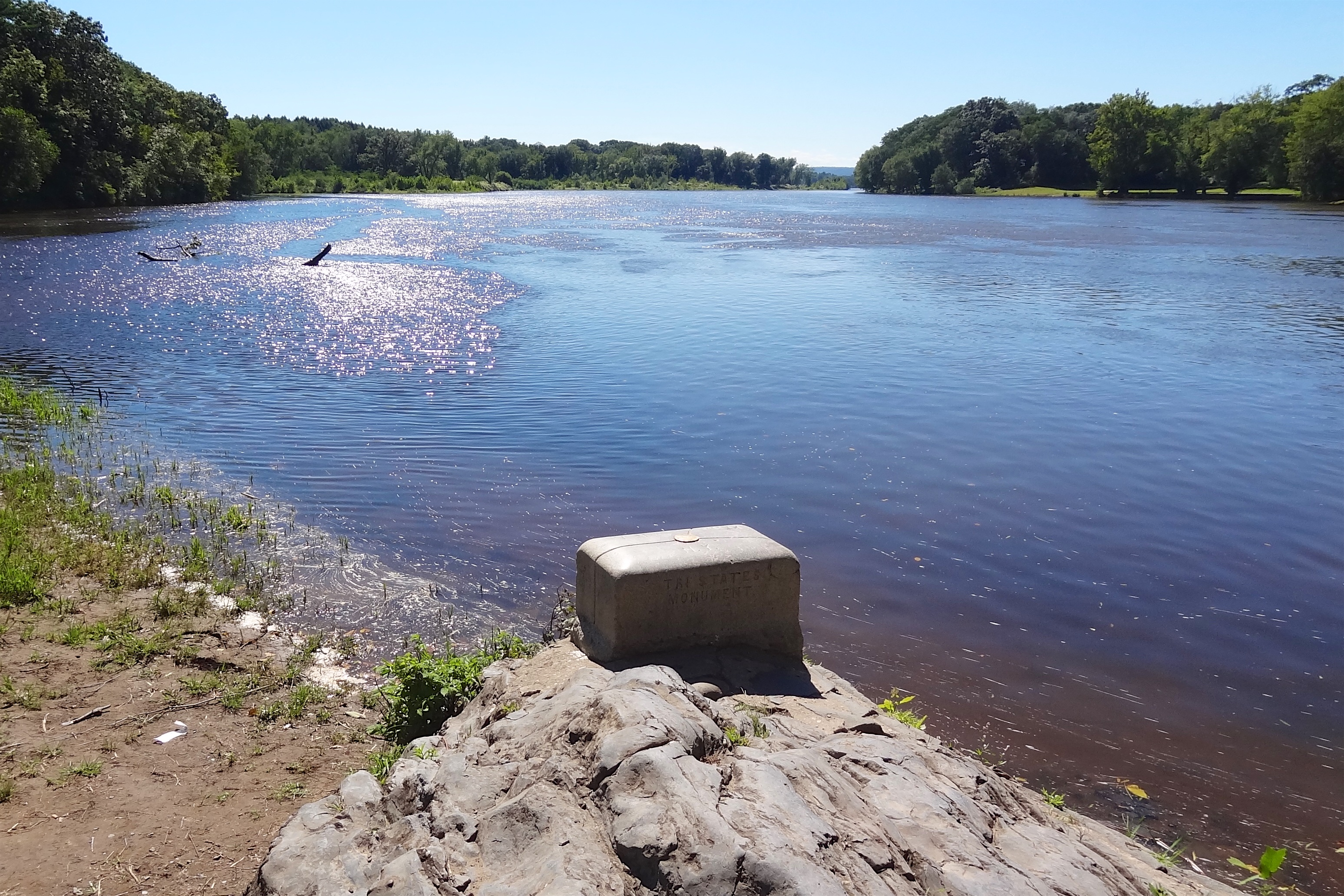
Looking southwest along the Delaware River, with Sussex County, New Jersey on the left and Pike County, Pennsylvania on the right

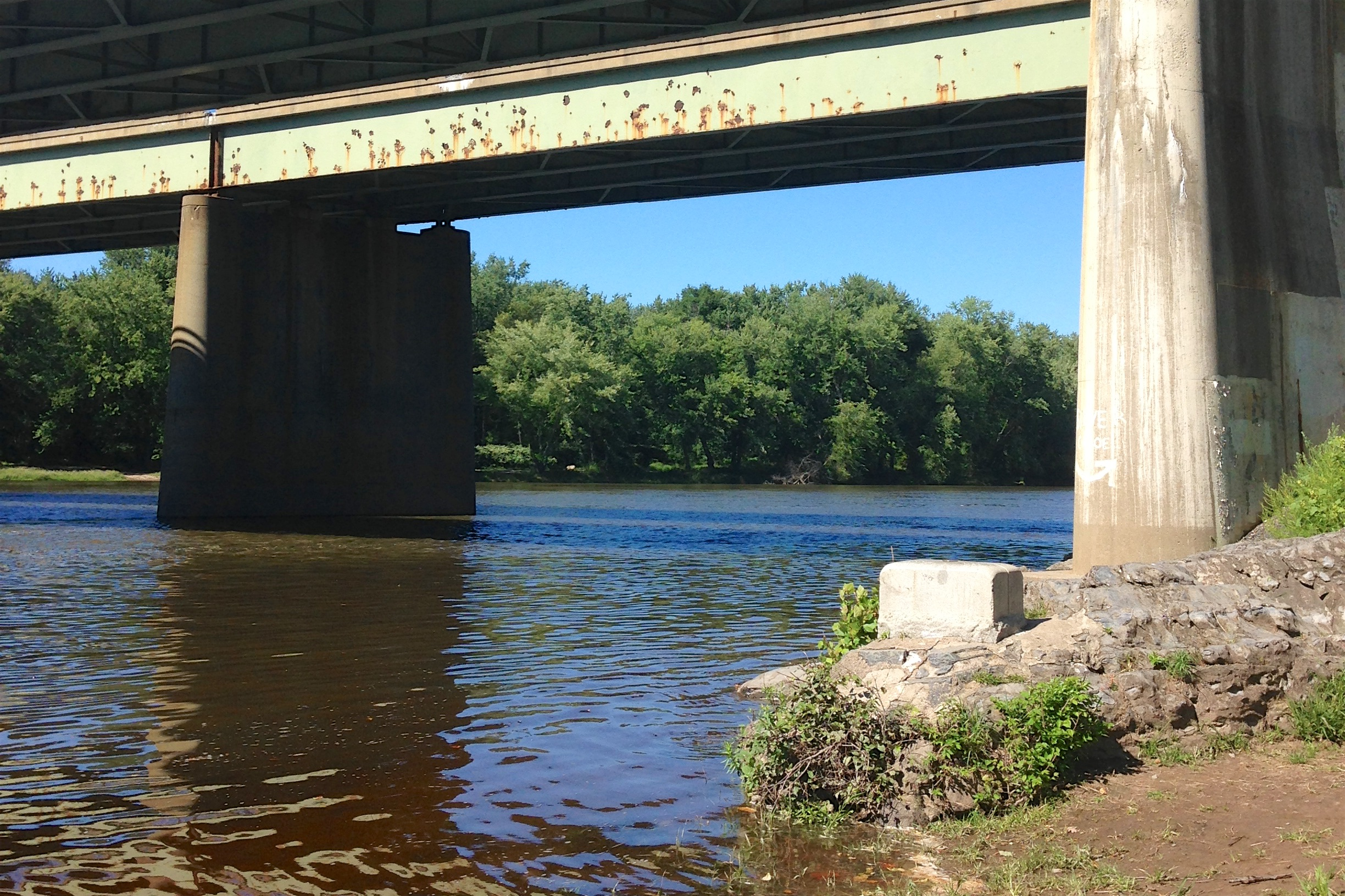
Looking north under the Interstate 84 bridge and along the Delaware River toward Matamoras, Pennsylvania

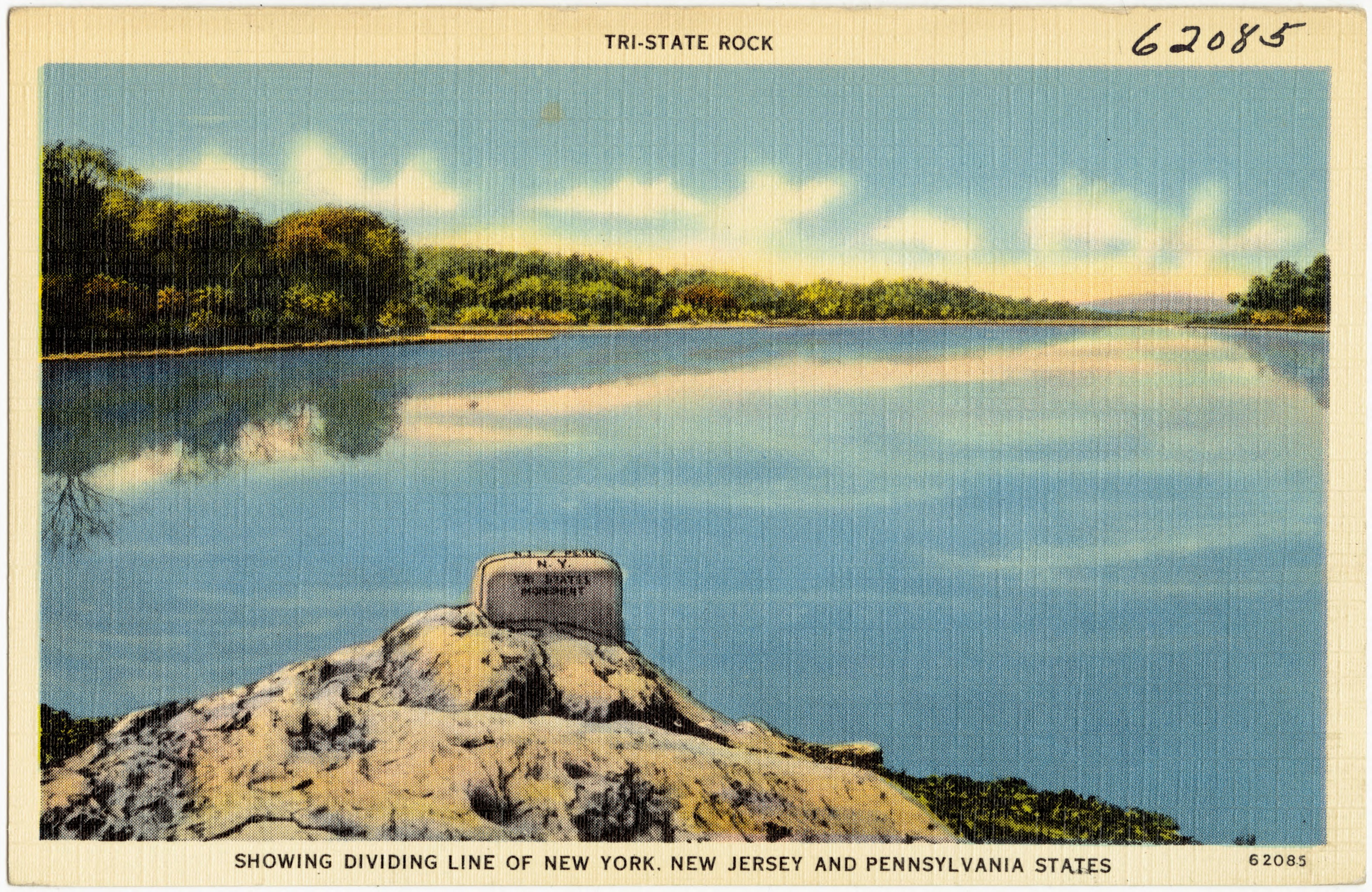
Postcard view

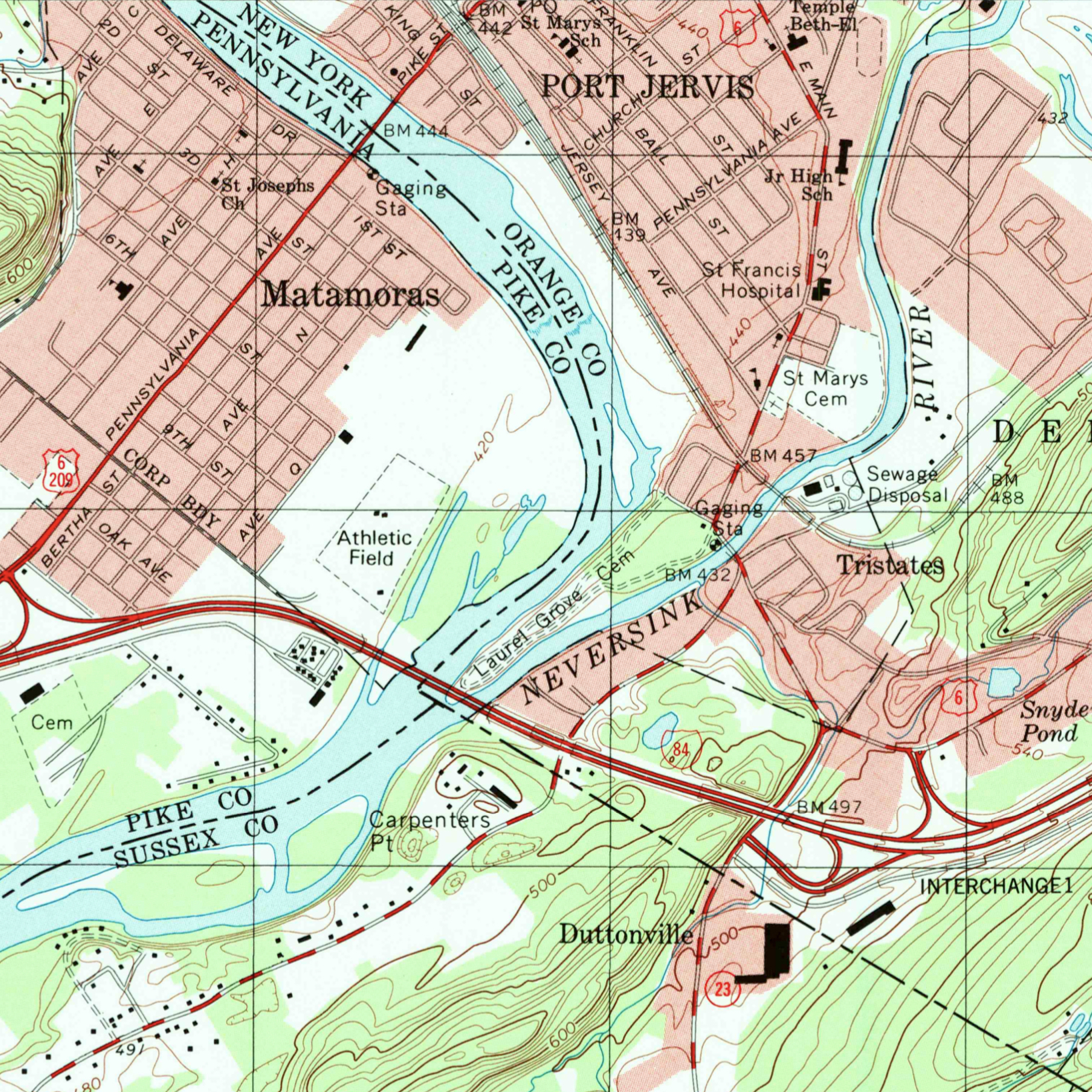
Topographic map showing state boundaries

== See also ==
- New York – New Jersey Line War
- New York–Pennsylvania border
- List of extreme points of U.S. states and territories
- List of tripoints of U.S. states
