= Better Place Forests =

Alternative burial service company

- Better Place logo
- Company type: Privately Held Company
- Industry: End-of-Life
- Founded: 2015
- Founder: Sandy Gibson, Brad Milne, Jamie Knowlton
- Headquarters: Sausalito, California, United States, United States
- Number of locations: 9 Memorial Forests
- Area served: US
- Key people: Adam Tibbs (CEO); Ineke Van Waardenburg (COO)
- Products: Memorial Tree, Forest Memorial, Memorial Markers
- Website: betterplaceforests.com

Better Place Forests is the company that created America's first conservation memorial forests. Their forests are sustainable alternatives to cemeteries. Instead of graves and tombstones, families choose a private, protected family tree to return their ashes to the earth together.

== History ==
The Sausalito, California based company, Better Place Forests Co., was founded in 2015 by Sandy Gibson, Brad Milne and Jamie Knowlton. The company focuses on end-of-life planning and forest conservation.

The company began in Northern California, with a flagship location on the Mendocino Coast in Point Arena, California. It continued to expand across California, the Southwest, Midwest, and Northeast.

== Locations ==
Better Place Forests has nine operating forests across America.

=== California ===
Better Place Forests Lake Arrowhead

Better Place Forests Point Arena

Better Place Forests Santa Cruz

Better Place Forests Yosemite Gateway

=== Southwest ===
Better Place Forests Flagstaff

=== Midwest ===
Better Place Forests Rock River

Better Place Forests St. Croix Valley

=== Northeast ===
Better Place Forests Berkshires

Better Place Forests Litchfield Hills

== The Better Place Forests Experience ==
Cremation rates in the United States have been rising rapidly, with some forecasts estimating 75% of Americans will choose cremation by 2038.

Better Place Forests created a proprietary process of integrating ashes with soil, so the ashes can become a part of the forest ecosystem.

Ashes are first mixes with local soil in a vessel. Wildflower petals are added to the vessel as a symbol of beauty. Friends and family of the deceased are inviting to participate in this process.

Led by a Forest Guide, the group proceeds to the chosen Memorial Tree, taking in the sights and sounds of the forest.

At the Memorial Tree, the ash and soil mixtures are placed inside a "nest" made of forest floor. Families often choose readings or to share memories at the tree.

Lastly, wildflower seeds are sprinkled around the tree, a symbol of new life.

Once the ground has settled, a Forest Guide places a custom-inscribed bronze Memorial Marker, inspired by the USGS survey markers.
