= Site No. JF00-072 =

Survey monument in the United States

- U.S. National Register of Historic Places
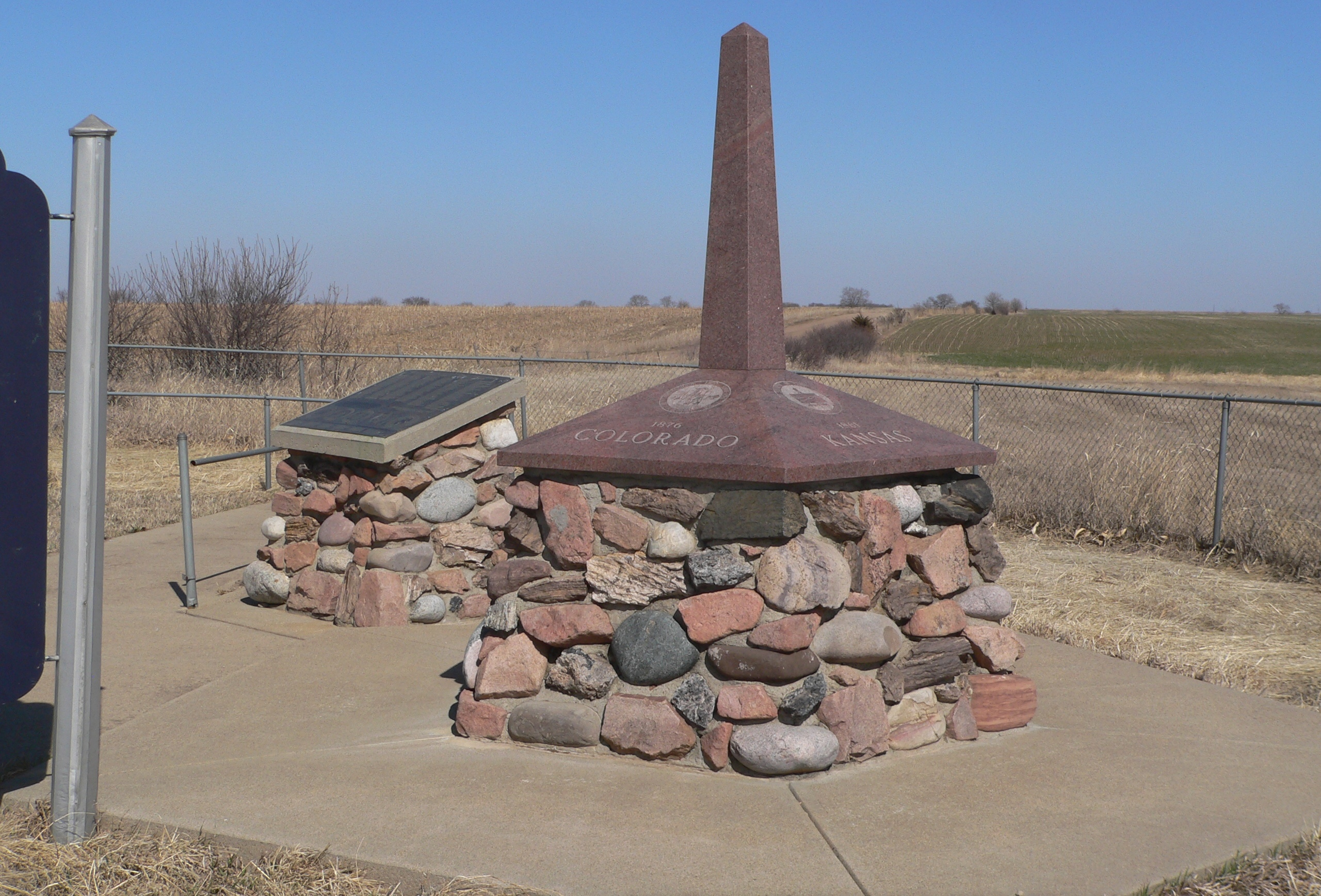

- Location within Kansas Location within the United States
- Nearest city: Mahaska, Kansas
- Coordinates: 40°0′7″N 97°22′9″W
- Area: less than one acre
- Built: 1856
- MPS: Nebraska--Kansas Public Land Survey TR
- NRHP reference No.: 87001000
- Added to NRHP: June 19, 1987

Site No. JF00-072 is a survey monument located at the quadripoint of Republic and Washington counties in Kansas and Jefferson and Thayer counties in Nebraska. The monument marks the intersection of the sixth principal meridian and its baseline, the 40th parallel north; it serves as the initial point of all land surveys in Kansas and Nebraska, as well as most of Wyoming and Colorado, and part of South Dakota. The original sandstone monument was 6 feet (1.8 m) tall. U.S. Deputy Surveyor Charles A. Manners set the monument in 1856. The monument was later buried under a county roadbed; it was unearthed and reburied twice before being dug up for good in 1986, though its middle section is now missing.

The monument was added to the National Register of Historic Places on June 19, 1987.

== See also ==
- OKKAMO Tri-State Marker: monument on the Oklahoma-Kansas-Missouri tripoint
- Site No. RH00-062: monument marking the beginning of the Kansas-Nebraska land survey
