= Tri-state area =

Informal term describing regions bordering on three US states

Tri-state area is an informal term in the United States which can refer to any of multiple areas that lie across three states. When referring to populated areas, the term implies a shared economy or culture among the area's residents, typically concentrated around a central metropolis.

Tri-state areas may or may not include a state boundary tripoint.

== Tri-state areas by region ==
The following is not an exhaustive list. "Tri-state area" may refer to several additional places in locally understood contexts, such as a business name.

=== Northeast ===
- The New York tri-state area, which includes parts of New York, New Jersey and Connecticut. Pennsylvania is sometimes included in the meaning of this usage of the term, since the New York metropolitan statistical area, as defined by the U.S. Census Bureau, includes a small part of the Commonwealth of Pennsylvania, but one still has to cross New York to access the state from Connecticut.
- The Philadelphia tri-state area, which includes parts of Pennsylvania, New Jersey, and Delaware. This use of "tri-state" excludes Maryland even though its northeast corner is closely tied to Philadelphia.
- The Pittsburgh tri-state area, covering parts of Pennsylvania, Ohio, and West Virginia.
- Maryland, Pennsylvania, and West Virginia
- The Erie tri-state area, which includes parts of northwest Pennsylvania, Ohio and New York.
- The Minisink Valley tri-state area, which includes parts of New York, Pennsylvania and New Jersey.
- New York, Vermont and Massachusetts
- Vermont, New Hampshire, and Maine
- The Berkshires, a region usually considered to include only western Massachusetts and northwestern Connecticut; when the Taconic portion of New York is included, the area is sometimes described as the "tri-state" or "tri-corners" area.
- Massachusetts, Rhode Island, and Connecticut

=== Midwest ===
- The Chicago tri-state area, or "Chicagoland," which includes northeast Illinois, Northwest Indiana and southeast Wisconsin. The Tri-State Tollway connects Wisconsin's portion with Indiana's. Parts of southwest Michigan in the Michiana region are also culturally tied to Chicago.
- The Illinois–Indiana–Kentucky tri-state area, centered around the confluence of the Wabash and Ohio Rivers.
- The Cincinnati tri-state area, which includes parts of Ohio, Kentucky and Indiana.
- Kyova, a region named for Kentucky, Ohio and West Virginia and home to Tri-State Airport.
- The Dubuque tri-state area, which includes parts of Iowa, Illinois and Wisconsin.
- The Fort Madison-Keokuk tri-state area, also known as the Quincy tri-state area, which includes parts of Iowa, Illinois and Missouri.
- The Sioux City metropolitan area region of Iowa, Nebraska, and South Dakota.
- The La Crosse tri-state area, which includes parts of Wisconsin, Minnesota and Iowa.
- The Tri-State district, a lead and zinc mining region of Oklahoma, Kansas and Missouri, known for producing "tri-state" minerals consisting mainly of sphalerite.

=== South ===
- The DMV, which includes the city of Washington (coterminous with the District of Columbia) as well as surrounding portions of Maryland and Virginia. Although the District of Columbia is not a state, the region is sometimes referred to as a "tri-state area." Furthermore, the Washington–Arlington–Alexandria metropolitan statistical area, as defined by the U.S. Census Bureau, includes Jefferson County, West Virginia, making the region a true tri-state area.
- The Illinois–Indiana–Kentucky tri-state area, centered around the confluence of the Wabash and Ohio Rivers.
- The Delmarva area, which includes Delaware and the eastern shores of Maryland and Virginia.
- Greater Memphis or the Mid-South, which includes west Tennessee, northwest Mississippi, and the Delta region of Arkansas.
- The Wiregrass Region, which includes southeast Alabama, southern Georgia and the Florida Panhandle.
- The Ark-La-Tex, a socioeconomic region that includes thirty-nine counties/parishes in Arkansas, Louisiana and Texas.
- The Southern Appalachian Tri-State Area, which includes portions of South Carolina, North Carolina, and Georgia, near the point where the three states converge. This region covers areas around Lake Hartwell and the Ellicott Rock Wilderness along the Chattooga River.
- Kyova, a region named for Kentucky, Ohio and West Virginia and home to Tri-State Airport.

=== West ===
- The Inland Northwest, historically and alternatively known as the Inland Empire, which includes Washington, Idaho, and Oregon.
- The Mohave Valley area of Bullhead City, Arizona; Needles, California; and Laughlin, Nevada.

== See also ==
- List of tripoints of U.S. states
- Four Corners
- Four-state area
- Twin cities, which includes tri-city
- Quad cities
- Three-Country Cairn, the tripoint where the borders of Norway, Sweden and Finland meet
- Phineas and Ferb, whose primary setting is a fictional, otherwise unnamed tri-state area
