= Carpenter's Point, New York =

Hamlet in Deer Park, New York, U.S.

Coordinates: 41.355°N 74.694°W

Map

Carpenter's Point is a historical hamlet in the City of Port Jervis, Orange County, New York United States, first settled circa 1690. It is located at the mouth of the Neversink River at its juncture with the Delaware River, near the point where the state lines of New Jersey, New York and Pennsylvania meet at the Tri-States Monument. It is named after the Carpenter family, who lived on the southeastern side of the Neversink, extending into New Jersey. Benjamin Carpenter operated a ferry across the Delaware here.
