= 8 Mile Corner =

Tri-point within the United States

Coordinates: 36°59′35.03584″N 102°2′31.64221″W

8 Mile Corner is a survey marker in the Cimarron National Grassland that marks the tri-point (a place where three states meet) of Kansas, Colorado, and Oklahoma. This point is also the meeting point for three distinct regions of America – the Western United States (Colorado), the Midwestern United States (Kansas), and the Southern United States (Oklahoma). An old mock weather vane stood nearby as a landmark, emblazoned with the abbreviations for the three states (Note: Colo, Kans, Okla) pointing in the direction of each respective state. The weather vane was reported to have been destroyed between 2011 and 2019. The old monument, locally referred to as a "windmill," was built in 1903.

== Tri-Point Marker ==
In 1990, the corner was reestablished by the Bureau of Land Management (BLM). The corner monument is below grade of east-west State Line Road in the westbound lane, hidden by a steel cover. On top of the tri-state monument is a manhole cover with embossing to indicate its location at the tri-point of the three states. A few feet below the closed manhole is the Department of the Interior cadastral survey disk set in concrete, part of the Federal Base Network. To access the tri-state corner monument, the road departments of three states need to be contacted, as it is at a road intersection.

The site is approximately 8 miles (13 km) west of Elkhart, Kansas on mostly-unpaved State Line Road at an elevation of 3,689.6 feet (1,124.6 meters).

There is another survey marker nearby with an arrow pointing to the tri-point corner. The 1990 BLM survey marker says: "Southwest corner of Kansas" above the arrow and "73.98 feet" below the arrow.

== "Windmill" monument ==
As of 2023, the government of Morton County, Kansas wanted to replace the fallen mock windvane (old "windmill") at the site. The new landmark was announced on January 5, 2024 on Facebook. The 2024 landmark appears to be a weather vane similar to the 1903 landmark, surmounted with a bison silhouette as before. The U.S. Forest Service and the State of Kansas added a sign in 2024.

The view around this site has been described as "starkly beautiful", with yucca blooms in the spring and buffalo gourd in the summer as the most notable flora. Visitors might see mule deer, prairie dogs, and burrowing owls in the area.

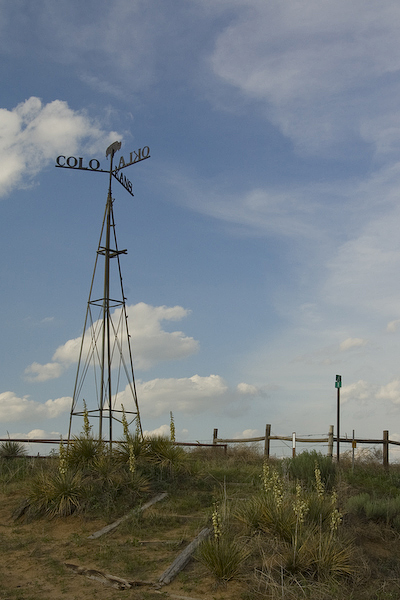
Original mock weather vane monument at the tri-point prior to its demise in the 2010s. Also known as the 8-Mile Corner windmill. Replaced in 2024.

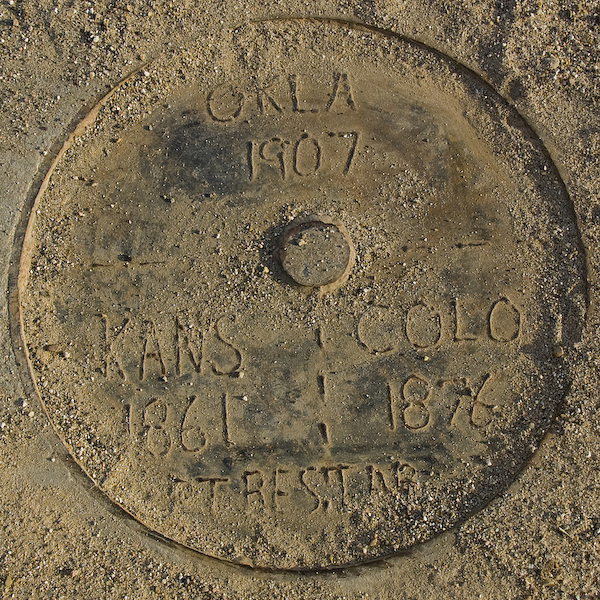
Manhole cover in the road, covering the actual tri-point monument, 1990

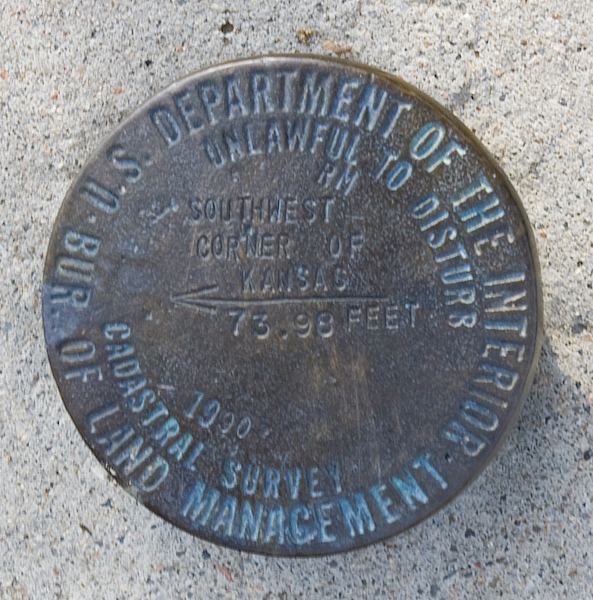
BLM survey marker in nearby Kansas, pointing to the tri-point, 1990

== See also ==
- Cimarron National Grassland
- Tri-point
- List of Oklahoma tri-points
- Four Corners Monument: monument on the Arizona-Colorado-New Mexico-Utah border
