= Preston Monument =

Tri-Point Marker

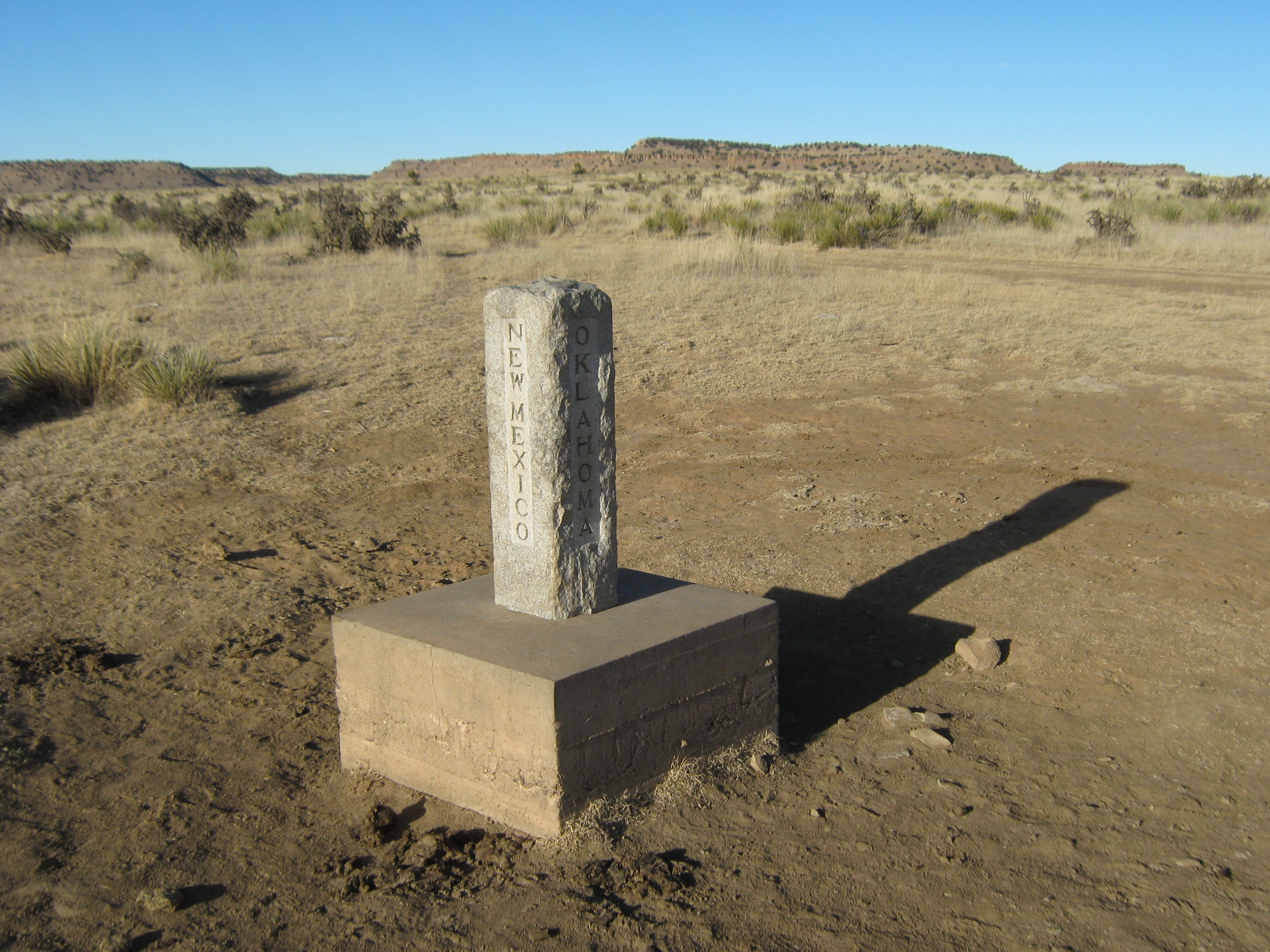
The tourist-friendly version of the Preston Monument showing its southern facets. The original Preston Monument was replaced by this modern granite marker in 1990.

The Preston Monument is the common name for a stone marker at the tri-point (the place where three states meet) of Oklahoma, Colorado, and New Mexico. It is named after Levi S. Preston who surveyed a portion of the New Mexico–Colorado border in 1900. The marker that bears his name was erected by the Bureau of Land Management in 1990.

Preston evaluated and established several monuments during his survey of 1900. He was contracted on October 25, 1899 with the United States General Land Office to survey the eastern New Mexico and western Texas borders and compare his results with prior surveys.

Besides determining the boundaries between Texas and New Mexico, Preston was tasked with determining the true location of (1) the northwest corner of Texas, a point of some contention and believed to be lost, (2) the tri-point of Oklahoma, Texas, and New Mexico some 2 miles to the east, and (3) the tri-point of Colorado, Oklahoma, and New Mexico, some 34 miles north, the tri-point bearing his name.

In 1902, Preston's success in establishing the northwest corner of the State of Texas was published in a bulletin of the U.S. Geological Survey. He was lauded for his "zeal, intelligence, and faithfulness."

Solving the contentious Texas-New Mexico border dispute was not his only legacy. The tri-point monument bearing his name would be called upon in the Supreme Court Case of New Mexico v. Colorado, 267 U.S. 30 (1925) to help establish the permanent border between New Mexico and Colorado.

== Tri-point of Oklahoma, Colorado, and New Mexico ==
The tri-point marker for Oklahoma, Colorado, and New Mexico is at an elevation of 4,445 feet (1,355 m) at 37°0′0.54029″N 103°0′8.39385″W. The current marker is of a modern concrete rectangular base with an erect, granite stone pillar, with its brass disk removed by vandals and replaced by a nail.

An 1881 marker is nearby which matches the description of the one erected by Richard O. Chaney and William W. Smith in the fall of 1881 when they surveyed the Cimarron meridian, the western border of Oklahoma. The old limestone marker is about 929 feet (283 m) north of the granite Preston monument, placing it in modern-day Colorado. Both markers have a parking lot for visitors arriving by car. Preston's Monument (1900) replaced the Cimarron Meridian's northern marker as the point marking the western extent of Oklahoma {see Chaney monument (1881), below}.

=== 37th parallel north and 103rd meridian west ===
The tri-point for Oklahoma, Colorado, and New Mexico is supposed to be the intersection between the 37th parallel north and the 103rd meridian west. This point had been located by several surveys before 1900. None of them had agreed. The State of Texas had decided to enter the Union as a slave state, and therefore had been forced to limit its northern extent to 36° 30" north. Areas to the north of the Texas panhandle had become part of "No Man's Land," now the Oklahoma Panhandle. The establishment of the borders of the land eventually known as Oklahoma had required a western limit of 103° west longitude, which is the same as the Texas–New Mexico border. Therefore, the southwest corner of Oklahoma and the northwest corner of Texas should be the same point, and the 37°N, 103°W point should be due north and around 34 miles (55 km) distant.

By 1900, it had become obvious that the original Texas–New Mexico border was a few miles west of the intended 103° meridian. The 1881 surveyors for the Cimarron meridian, Richard O. Chaney and William W. Smith, had set their meridian very close to modern 103° meridian and essentially ignored the erroneous Clark 103° meridian to the south. They also ignored the Macomb and Johnston markers to their west. The Cimarron meridian therefore set the western edge of the Oklahoma Panhandle around 2.2 miles (3.5 km) east of the Texas-New Mexico border, a contentious issue in years to come. However, both the Cimarron meridian and the Texas-New Mexico border established in the 19th century would be confirmed as the correct borders in legal battles.

All of these survey points were supposed to mark 37°N, 103°W or be very close to it:

- Johnston monument (1857) by John H. Clark (also reused by John J. Major in 1874 for the New Mexico border) and named for Col. Joseph Eggleston Johnston. Because it was quickly determined to be far to the west of the 103rd meridian, this monument should have never been used for anything but a reference and then torn down. It was calculated in 1857 to be 11,582 feet (3,530 m) west of the 103rd. The 1857 survey suffered from egregious mathematical errors by Clark, the astronomer and surveyor, but he was correct in determining that it was 2 miles (3 km) from its intended position.
- No marker (1859) by John H. Clark, but its location was established by Preston in 1900 from Clark's 103° meridian farther south on the western Texas border. Why or how Clark used the Johnston monument for the 103rd meridian is inexplicable.
- Macomb monument (1859) by Capt. John Navarre Macomb, Jr., supposedly the NE corner of New Mexico
- Darling monument (1868) was in the same place as Macomb's but rebuilt by Ehud N. Darling
- Major's monument (1874) was Darling's and Macomb's monument, rebuilt like Macomb's original by John J. Major
- Chaney monument (1881) by Chaney and Smith, used for the Cimarron meridian. Still extant. This stone monument is located at 37°00′09.72817″N 103°00′08.40630″W, about 950 feet (290 m) north of the Johnston monument.
- Preston monument (1900) by Preston. He found all of the above previous monuments and measured to them. No longer extant.
- The new monument (1990). There is a granite marker for tourism located here. It was a reset of the Preston monument. Still extant, but missing its brass plate.

The Preston monument established a tri-point of New Mexico, Colorado, and Oklahoma in 1900. Its location was disputed by New Mexico but upheld by the U.S. Supreme Court in 1925:

The boundary between the States of Colorado and New Mexico is the line of the 37th parallel as surveyed and marked by Darling from the Macomb monument westwardly to the 109th Meridian, and as surveyed and marked by Major and Preston from the said Macomb monument eastwardly to the Preston monument on the 103rd or Cimarron Meridian.

— P. 267 U. S. 39

== Northwest corner of Texas and the 1900 survey ==
Preston found and replaced the Johnston monument to re-establish it and determine the corner where Texas and New Mexico meet but Oklahoma doesn't. This is normally called the Northwest corner of Texas. The NW corner of Texas is some 25 miles south of the Johnston monument.

Its location was disputed by New Mexico, as well, but not openly. In 1910, just after the Enabling Act for New Mexico was passed by the U.S. Congress, the New Mexico Territory drew up their constitution to be approved for statehood by the U.S. Congress. In Article 1, it deigned to establish the 103rd meridian as the boundary with Texas. This wasn't noticed by the media or the legislators, but an investor with the XIT Ranch, John V. Farwell, Jr. grew alarmed at the potential problems it would cause him. Farwell contact his old Yale College friend, the President of the United States, Howard Taft, to help him keep his land. It worked. A joint resolution of Congress passed on February 24, 1911 establishing Preston's new marker and the old John H. Clark meridian as the boundary.

John Major searched for the "lost" northwest corner of Texas on his 1874 survey, but did not find it. It had been seen seven years earlier by Ehud Darling, the surveyor for the Colorado survey, albeit partially destroyed. He described it as a stone marked in black paint, but not in its original location. Darling seems to have re-constructed it. Major actually found the benchmark stone that was intended for the corner, but it had been repurposed at a survey station about 8 miles away for a gravestone.

After much searching, Major thought he found the NW corner of Texas as established by

Preston found the old 1859 John H. Clark corner in 1900. He laid a stone marker where he had found two previous posts, the earlier of which he was convinced was the original marker from 1859, stating:

At this northwest corner of the [Capitol Syndicate Company's] XIT [Ranch] pasture fence, I remove wire fencing, dig up the corner post, which I find set 18 inches in the ground, and set on top of the rotted stump of an old cedar post. Excavating carefully around this old stub, I find the bottom of it at 26 inches below surface of ground, and remove a segment of the old post 8 inches in diameter and 8 inches long, greatly decayed and reduced almost to a dry pulpy ash. The dark mould and pieces of decayed cedar indicated that the original post was about 10 X 12 inches in diameter at bottom. This old cedar post could easily have been in the ground more than the eighteen years since 1882, and very likely for ten years longer.

Thus, Preston re-established the northwest corner of Texas that had been in use since the incomplete 1859 survey. He continues:

I set a sandstone 60 X 12 X 10 inches 36 inches in the ground for the northwest corner of the State of Texas, marked

"N.W. Cor.
---------
  Texas"

on the east; "N. M." on west; "1859" on the south; and "1900" on the north faces.

The marker, if still intact, is apparently under the road surface of U.S. Route 56.

== Texhomex at the tri-point of Oklahoma, Texas, and New Mexico ==
Richard O. Chaney and William W. Smith established the Cimarron meridian in 1881, setting the monuments at two tri-points on the western edge of No Man's Land before Oklahoma was admitted as a State. The southern one would become known as Texhomex. It was re-established and checked by Preston in 1900. Its location was instrumental in finding the northwest corner of Texas.

== See also ==
- List of tri-points of U.S. states
- 8 Mile Corner: monument on the Colorado-Kansas-Oklahoma border
- Four Corners Monument: monument on the Arizona-Colorado-New Mexico-Utah border
- OKKAMO Tri-State Marker: monument on the Arkansas-Missouri-Oklahoma tripoint
- Texhomex: monument on the New Mexico-Oklahoma-Texas tripoint
