= Tri-State Peak =

Mountain at the convergence of the U.S. states of Kentucky, Tennessee, and Virginia

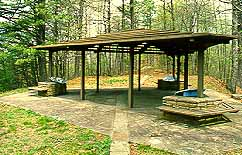
- The summit of Tri-State Peak

Highest point
- Elevation: 1,990 ft (610 m)
- Coordinates: 36°36′03″N 83°40′28″W

Geography
- Location: Cumberland Gap National Historical Park, Bell County, Kentucky, Claiborne County, Tennessee, and Lee County, Virginia, United States
- Parent range: Cumberland Mountains

Climbing
- Easiest route: Tri-State Peak Trail

Tri-State Peak is a mountain located in the Cumberland Gap National Historical Park, near the "saddle" of the gap. It gets its name from being on the tripoint of the state of Kentucky, Tennessee, and Virginia.

The elevation at the tri-state marker is 1,990 feet (610 m). The marker can be accessed via the "tri-state peak trail," (via connections with the Gap trail and the Object Lesson Road trail) and is about 1.2 miles (1.9 km) from the park's visitor center.

The site also includes a marker denoting the location as being on the "Royal Colonial Boundary of 1665," which was marked by the American Society of Civil Engineers.

Royal Colonial Boundary of 1665 plaque

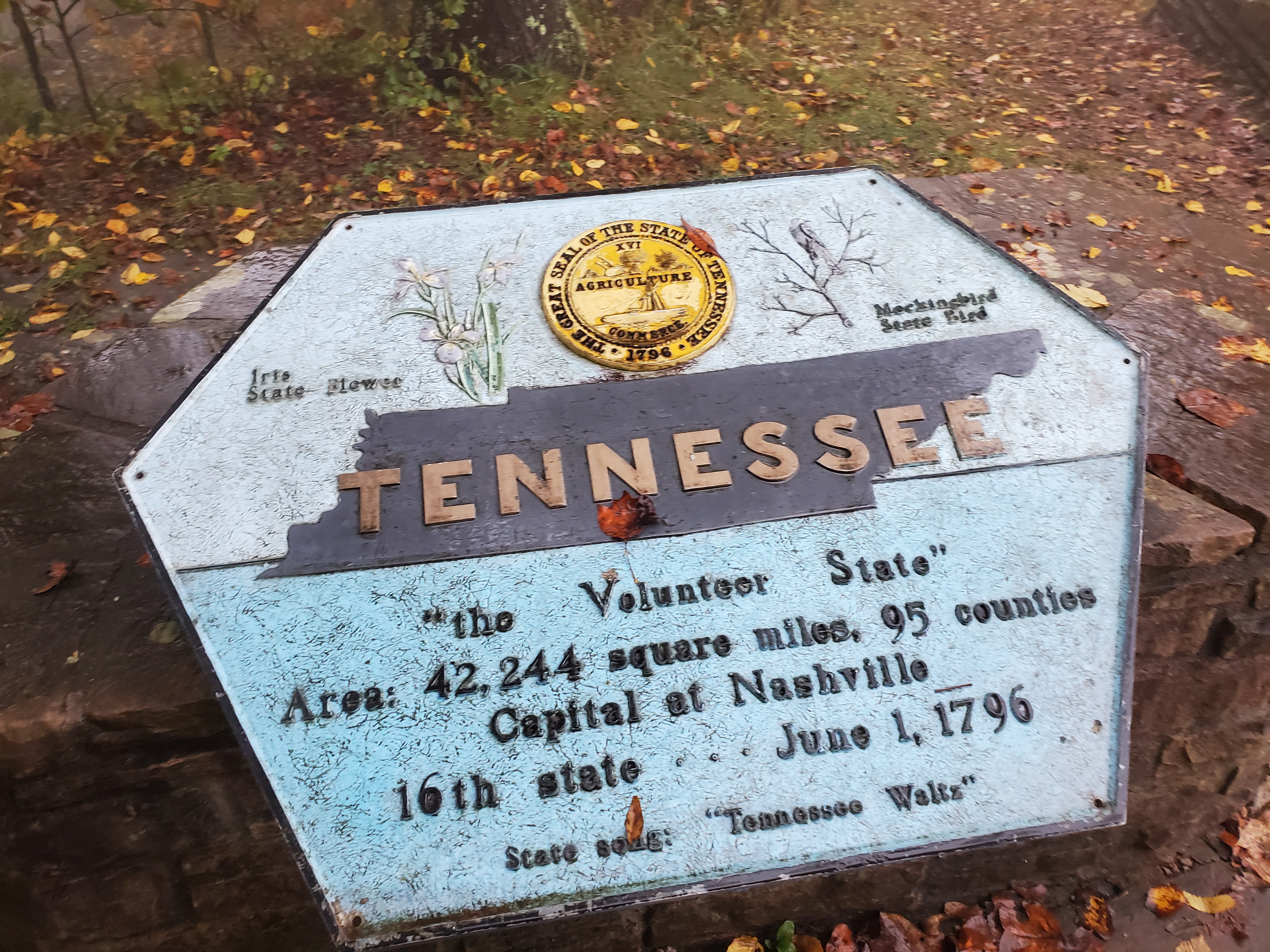
Marker for Tennessee at Tri-State Peak

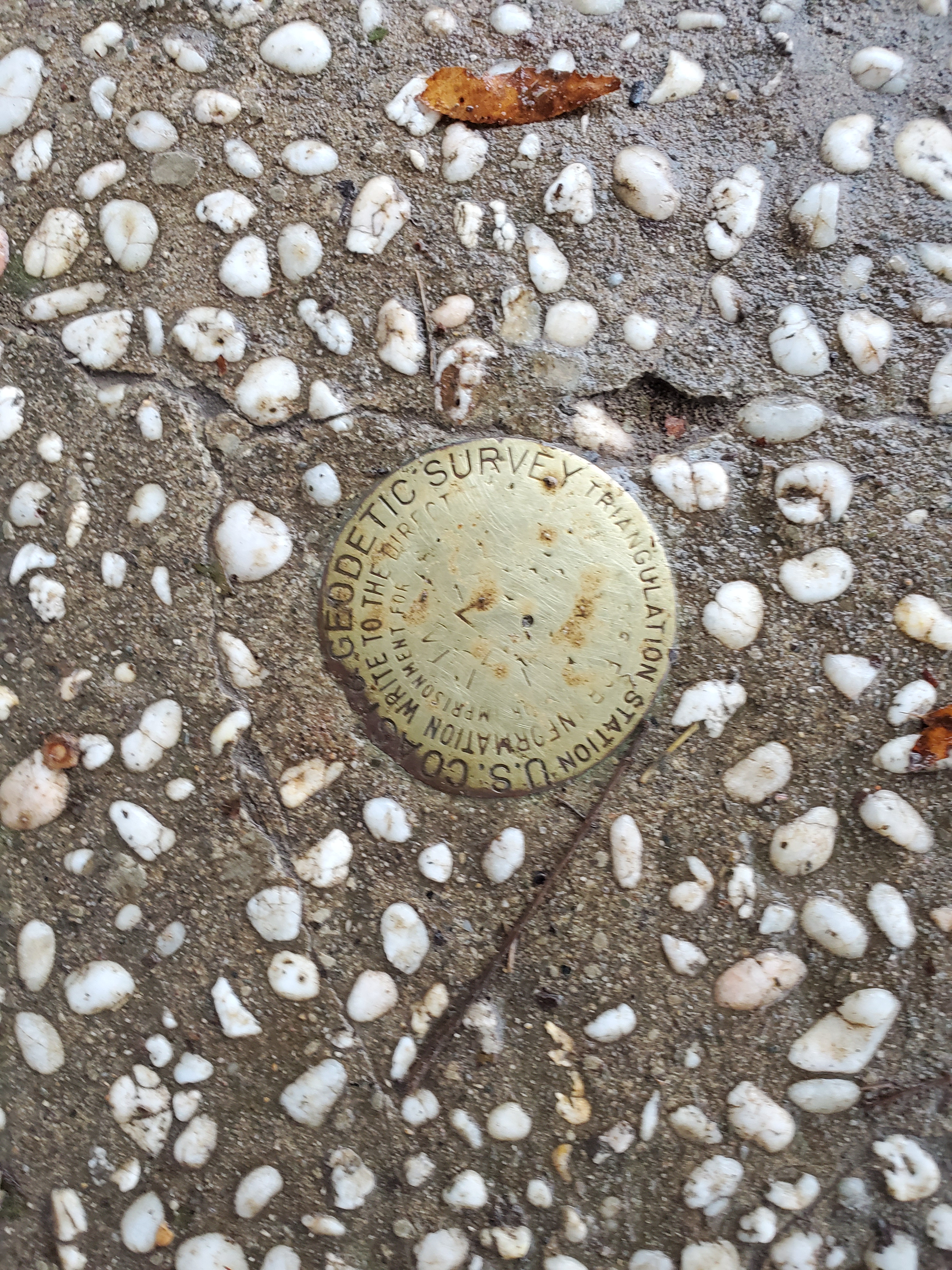
Marker for the KY-TN-VA tripoint

== See also ==
- List of tripoints of U.S. states
