= Cimarron meridian =

US survey line

The Cimarron meridian is a survey line in the United States at longitude 103° west from Greenwich. It extends from latitude 36° 30′ to 37° north, and, with the baseline in latitude 36° 30′ north, governs the surveys in Oklahoma west of 100° west longitude from Greenwich, i.e. the Oklahoma Panhandle.

The meridian was established by Richard O. Chaney and William W. Smith in the fall of 1881.

The initial point for the Cimarron meridian is confused with the marker known as Texhomex, which was placed during a resurvey. The Cimarron meridian initial point marker establishes the place where the 103° west meridian intersects the baseline from whence land in the Oklahoma Panhandle (formerly No Man's Land) is surveyed. It was the last meridian established in the Continental United States.

The initial point is about 2 miles east of the northwest corner of Texas, both of which were surveyed to lie on the 103° west meridian in the 19th century before longitudinal accuracy was assured. While theoretically in the same location, the surveys used radically different methods.

The northern end of the meridian was established for the northwestern point of Oklahoma. While instrumental in establishing the 103° west meridian still being used for the border between Oklahoma and New Mexico, its position about 929 feet (283 m) north of the line used as the 37° north line makes it of little importance to surveyors.

== Northern marker ==
When Levi S. Preston found the Cimarron meridian markers, he used them to re-establish the 103° west meridian during his 1900 resurvey. But he setup his own marker at the tri-point (the place where three states meet) of Oklahoma, Colorado, and New Mexico that would follow the Colorado-New Mexico border established by John J. Major in 1874.

The 1881 Chaney monument is located at 37°0′9.72817″N 103°00′8.40630″W, nearly 1000 feet north of the Preston monument that marks the tri-state corner.

== Southern marker ==
The southern Cimarron meridian marker was replaced by a modern one in 1932. It is located at 36°30′5.26313″N 103°0′8.59234″W. It is about 350 feet (110 m) north of Texhomex.

== See also ==
- List of principal and guide meridians and base lines of the United States

== Sources ==
- Raymond, William Galt (1914). Plane Surveying for Use in the Classroom and Field (via Internet Archive). New York: American Book Company.
- The Nevada Traverse, Journal of the Professional Land Surveyors of Nevada, Vol. 45, No.4, December 2018
- Surveys and Surveyors of the Public Domain, 1785-1975, Lola Cazier, US Department of Interior, USGPO, Washington, 1978, p.202
