= Texhomex =

Texas-New Mexico-Oklahoma border tripoint

Coordinates: 36°30′01.66694″N 103°0′8.57933″W

Texhomex is a marker showing the tripoint of Oklahoma, Texas, and New Mexico. The marker is off U.S. Highway 56 about two miles (3 km) east on Texas State Line Road at the corner of Oklahoma State Line Road, and is at an elevation of 4,712 feet (1,436 m). No signs are posted on Highway 56 in either direction.

The tristate marker is typically covered by soil, but a concrete pillar marker can be seen from a nearby fence. A witness post and sign are a short distance from the underground marker.

== Other nearby geographic points ==
The northwest corner of Texas is located just 2.2 miles (3.5 km) west of this point, although it should theoretically be at the same spot. The great distance is due to surveying errors in 1859 by surveyor John H. Clark. The joint congressional resolution in 1911 declared the line surveyed by Clark to be the actual boundary line between Texas and New Mexico. The northwest corner of the Texas Panhandle had been previously marked, but the marker was either removed or buried when the highway was widened in 2016.

The marker for the Cimarron Meridian initial point is located about 350 feet (110 m) north of the Texhomex corner, and is marked by a concrete pillar and a sign.

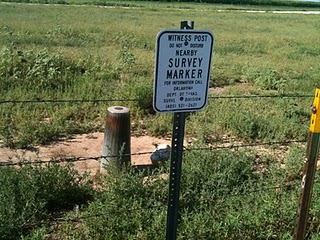
Marker location

New Mexico top right, Oklahoma bottom right, Texas on the left

== See also ==
- List of tripoints of U.S. states
- Four Corners Monument: monument on the Arizona-Colorado-New Mexico-Utah border
- International Boundary Marker: monument on the Louisiana-Texas border
- OKKAMO Tri-State Marker: monument on the Arkansas-Missouri-Oklahoma tripoint
- Preston Monument: monument on the Colorado-New Mexico-Oklahoma tripoint
