= OKKAMO Tri-State Marker =

Monument in Kansas, Missouri, and Oklahoma, U.S.

Coordinates: 36°59′55″N 94°37′05″W

OKKAMO Tri-State Marker is a monument showing the tripoint of Oklahoma, Kansas, and Missouri. It is located at an elevation of 1,016 feet (310 m), though one source says 1,024 feet (312 m). The marker is about 300 feet (90 m) north of I-44 and about 1,000 feet (300 m) east of the Downstream Casino and Resort, which is operated by the Quapaw Nation.

A marker built from native stone was erected in 1938 by the WPA, but it is located 50 feet (15 m) to the west of the actual tri-point. A stand-on plaque was added in October 2004 at the actual site of the tripoint.

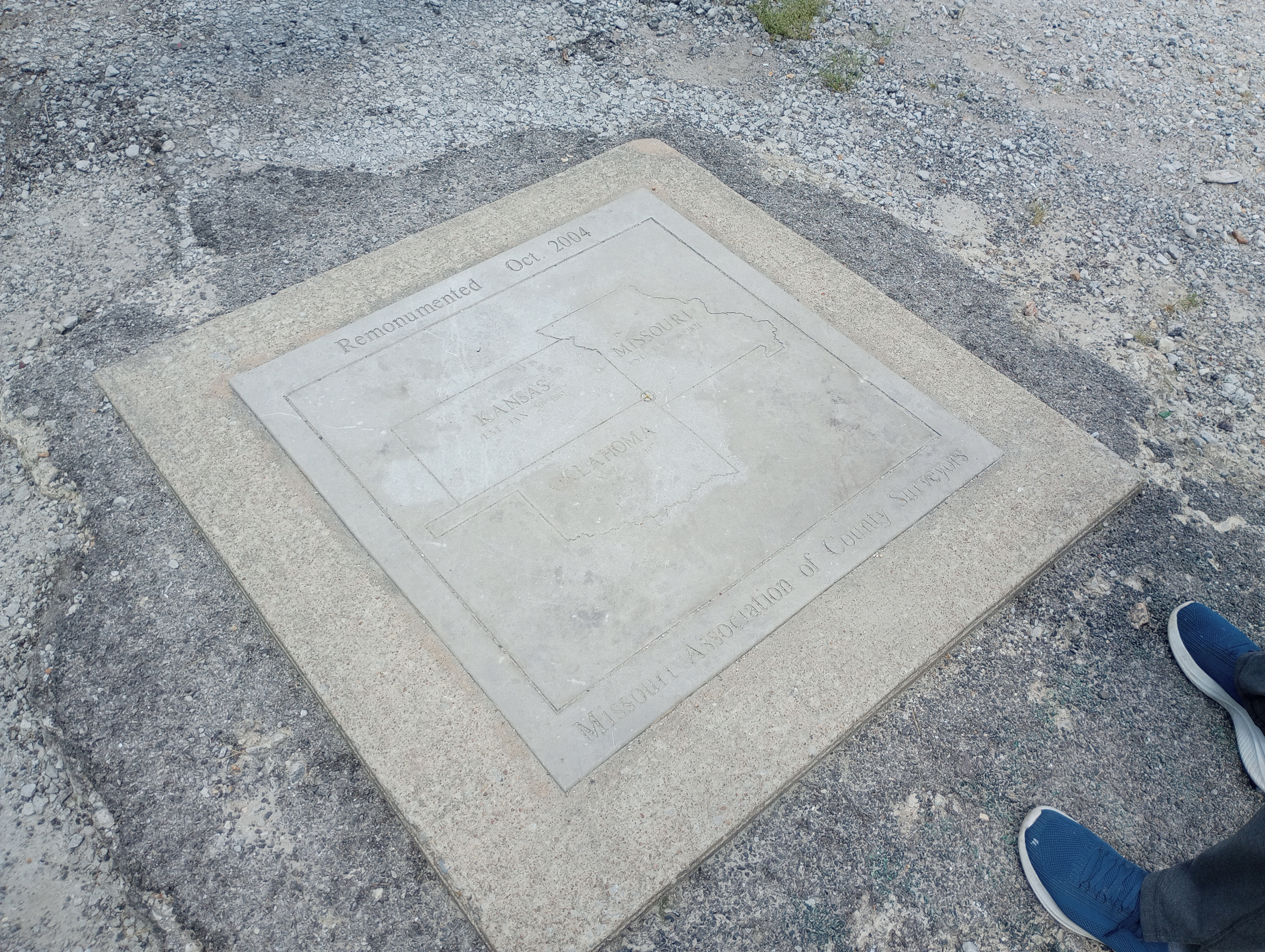

== See also ==
- List of Oklahoma tri-points
- Preston Monument: monument on the Colorado-New Mexico-Oklahoma tripoint
- Site No. JF00-072: monument on the Kansas-Nebraska border
- Site No. RH00-062: monument on the Kansas-Nebraska border
- Texhomex: monument on the New Mexico-Oklahoma-Texas tripoint
- United States Highway 61 Arch: monument on the Arkansas-Missouri border
