= List of tripoints of U.S. states =

This is a list of all tripoints in which the boundaries of three (and only three) U.S. states converge at a single geographic point. Of the 60 such points, 36 are on dry land and 24 are in water. Of the points in water, 3 are in the Great Lakes and thus have no land nearby. A tripoint occurring in a populated area may also be informally described as a tri-state area.

While most U.S. states form at least one tripoint, the states of Alaska, Hawaii, and Maine do not form any. The only U.S. state Maine shares a border with is New Hampshire while Alaska and Hawaii do not border any other U.S. states.

== Land ==
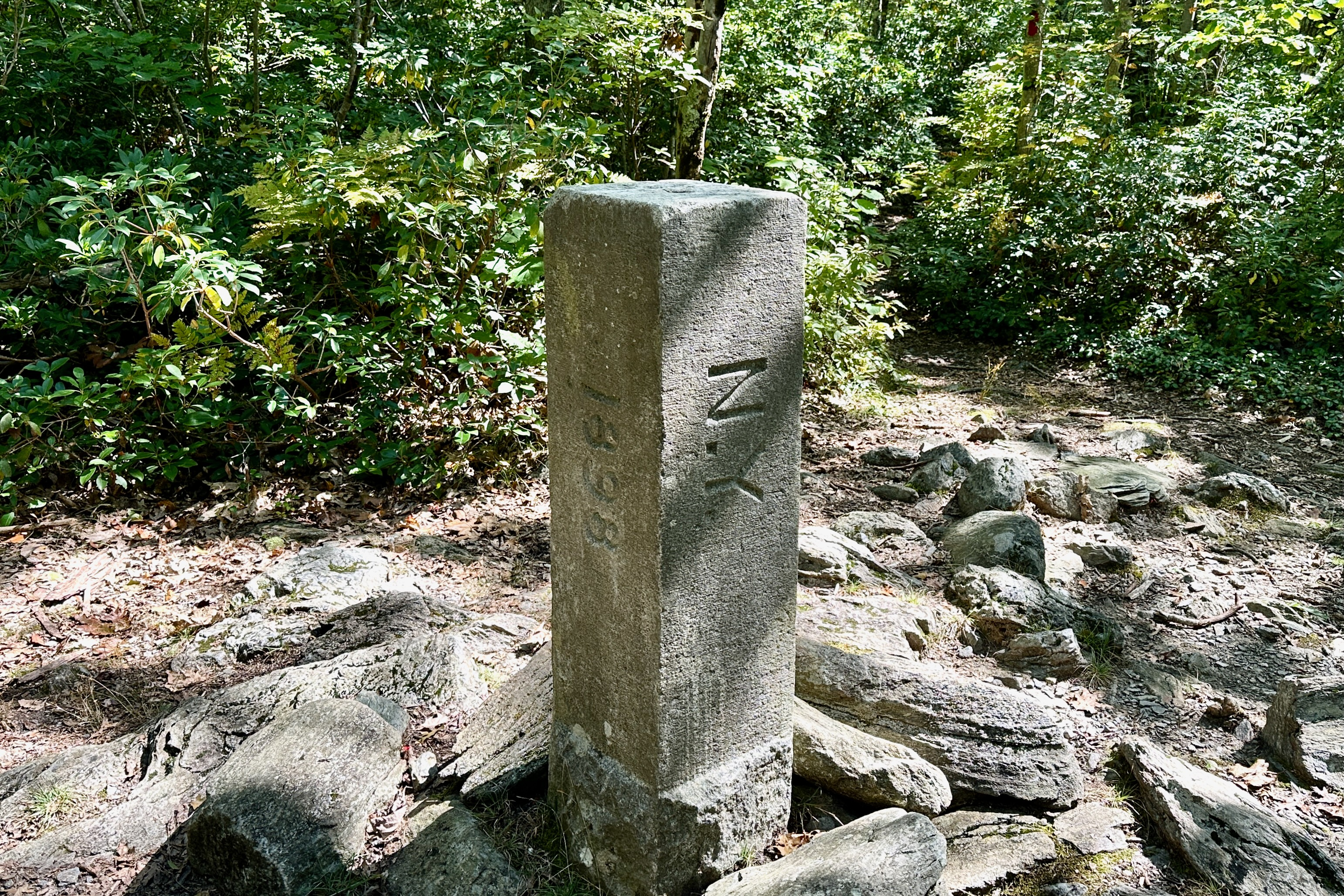
Connecticut–Massachusetts–New York tripoint marker

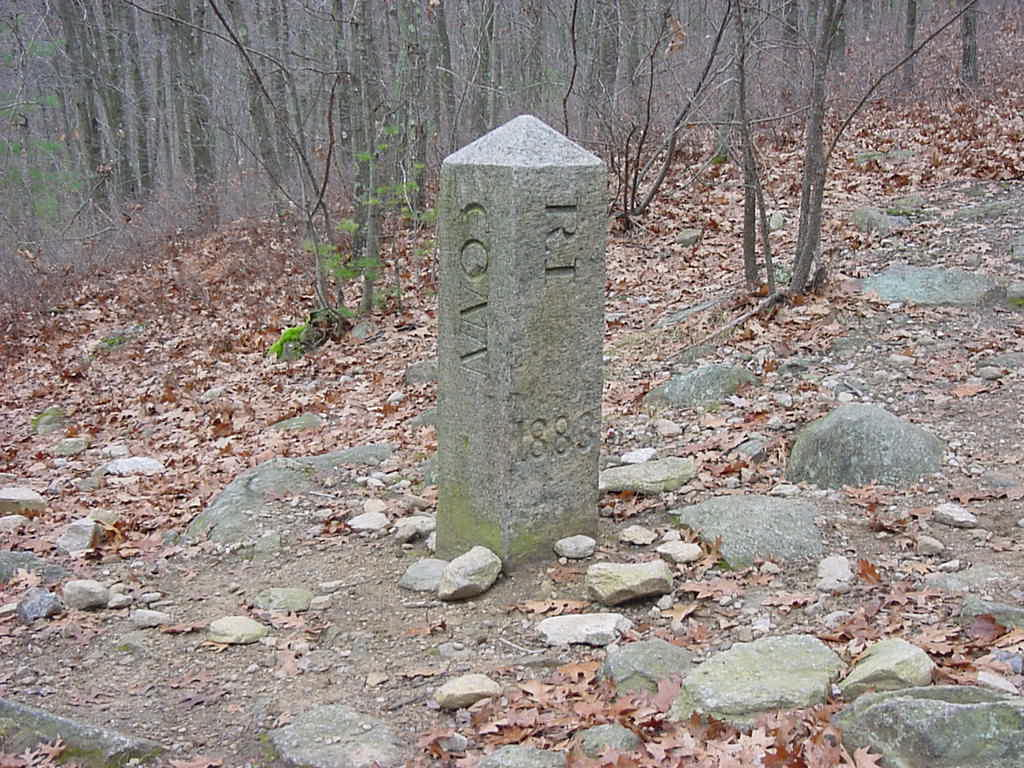
Connecticut–Rhode Island–Massachusetts tripoint marker

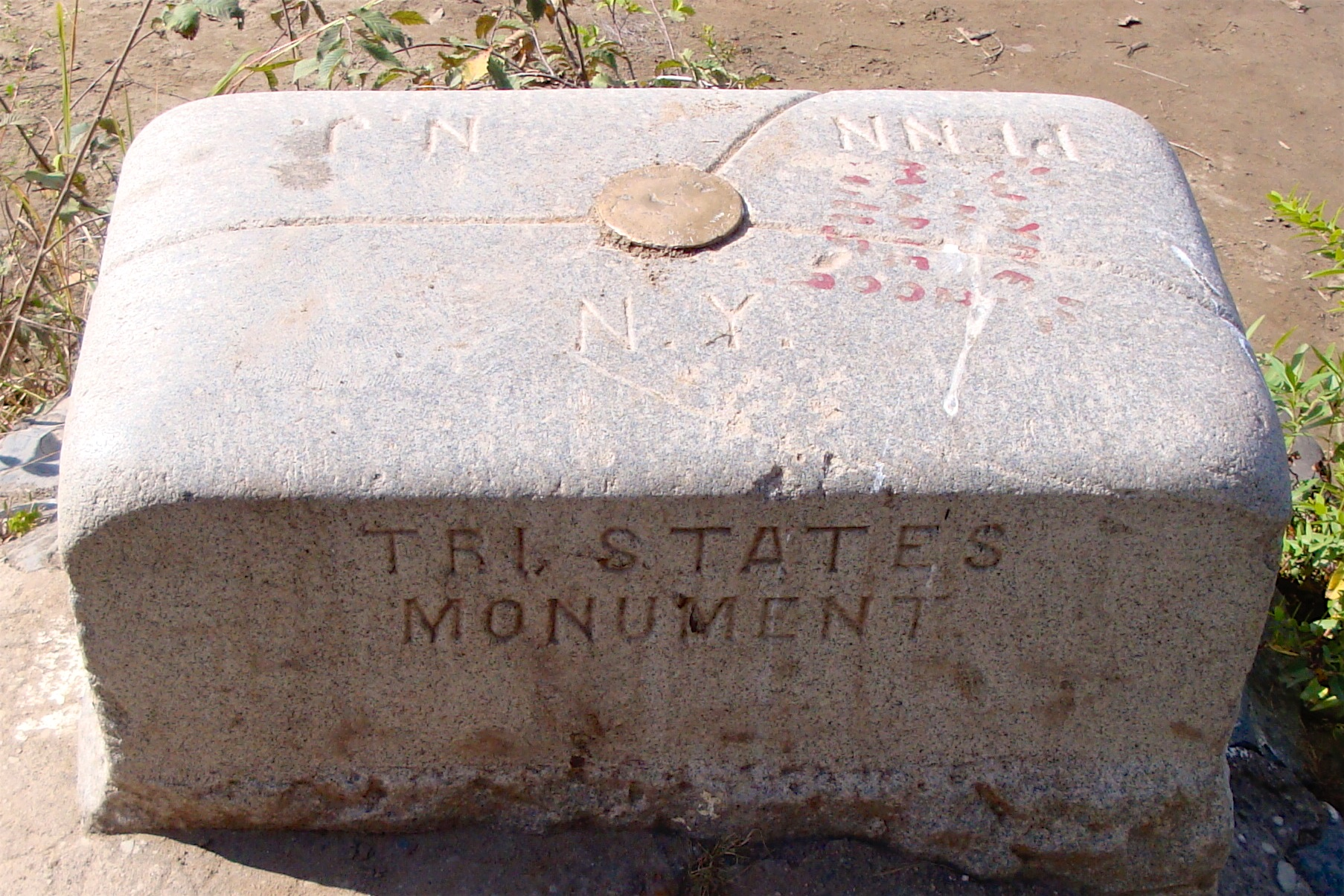
New Jersey–New York–Pennsylvania tripoint marker

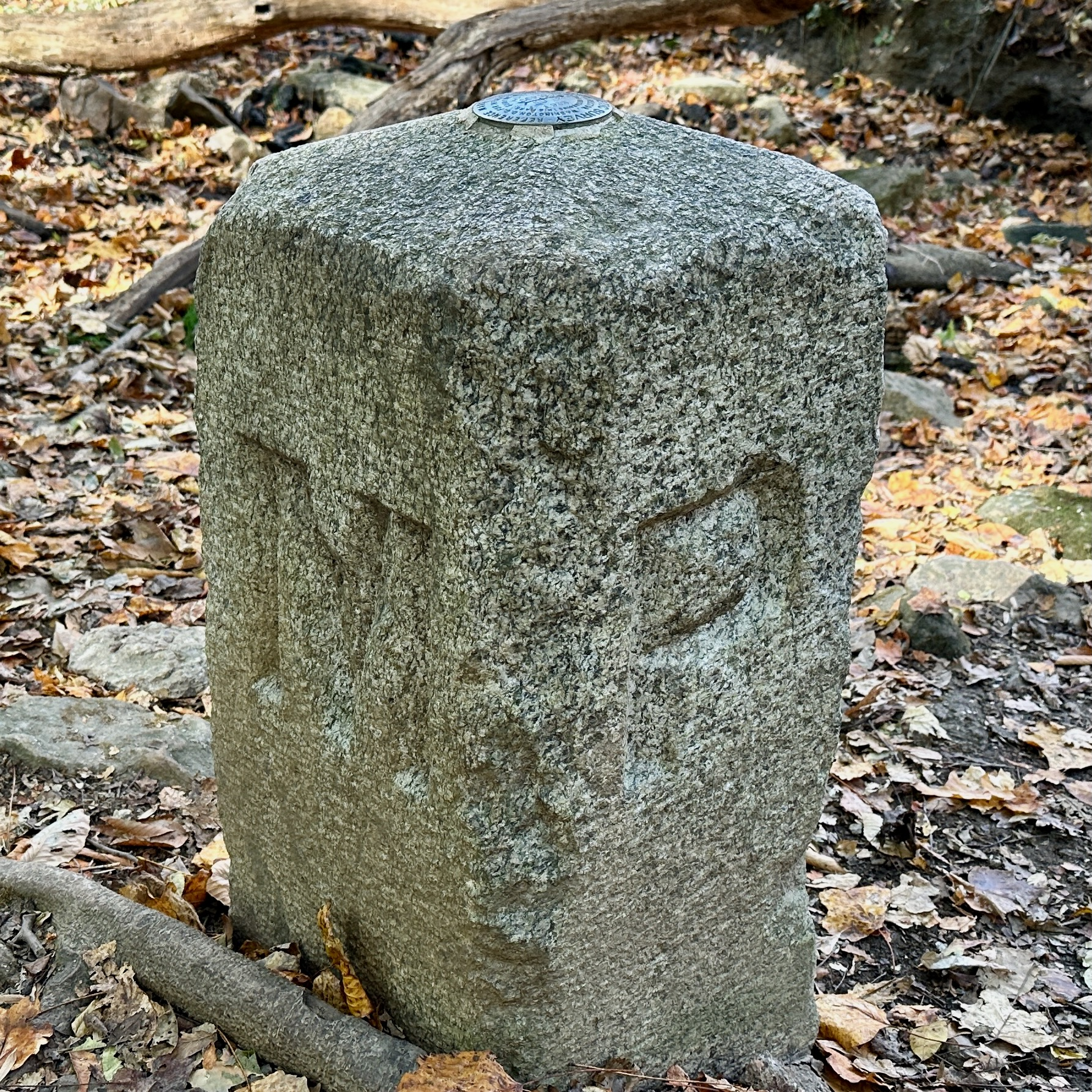
Delaware–Maryland–Pennsylvania tripoint marker

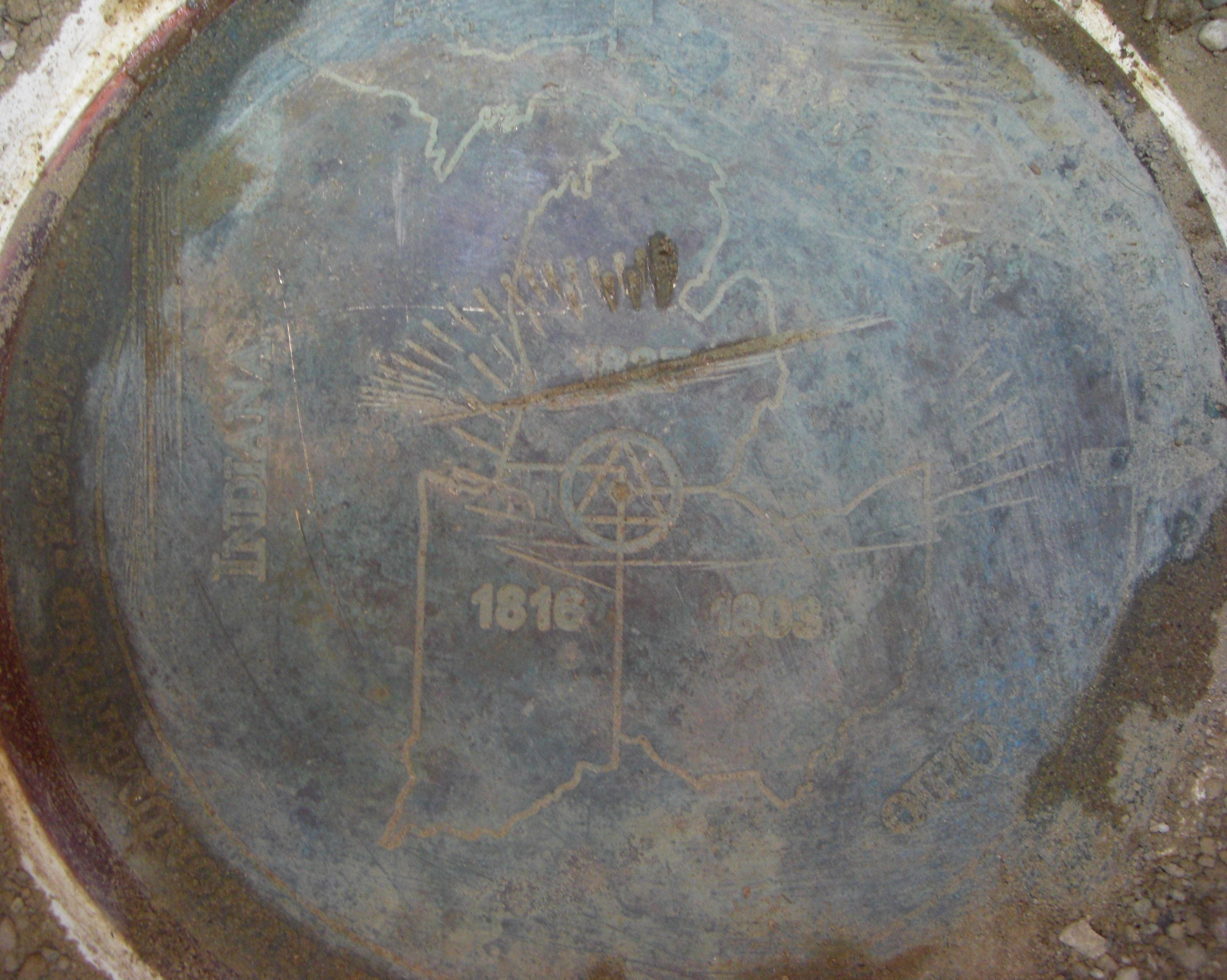
Indiana–Michigan–Ohio tripoint marker

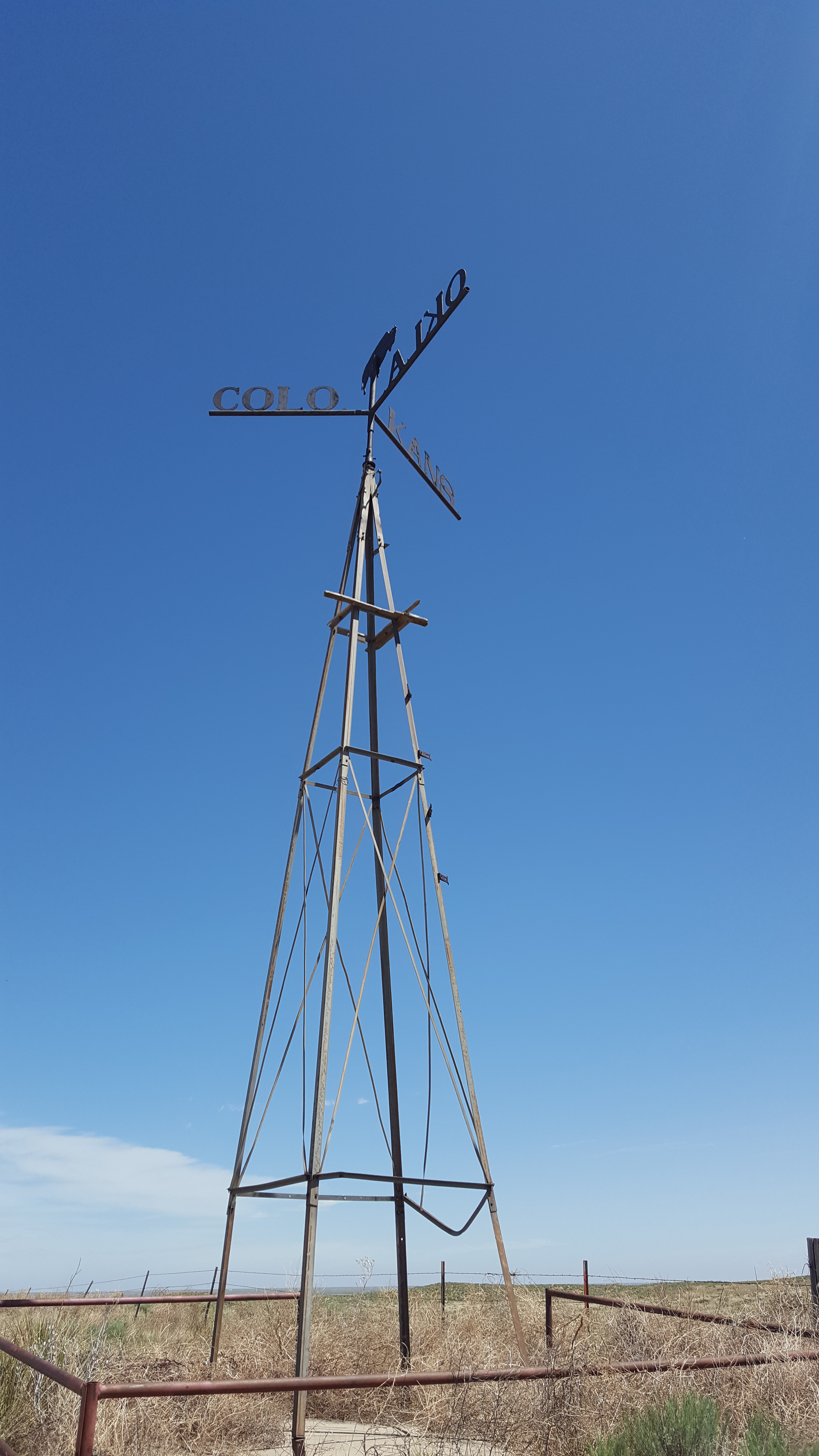
Colorado–Kansas–Oklahoma tripoint marker (8 Mile Corner)

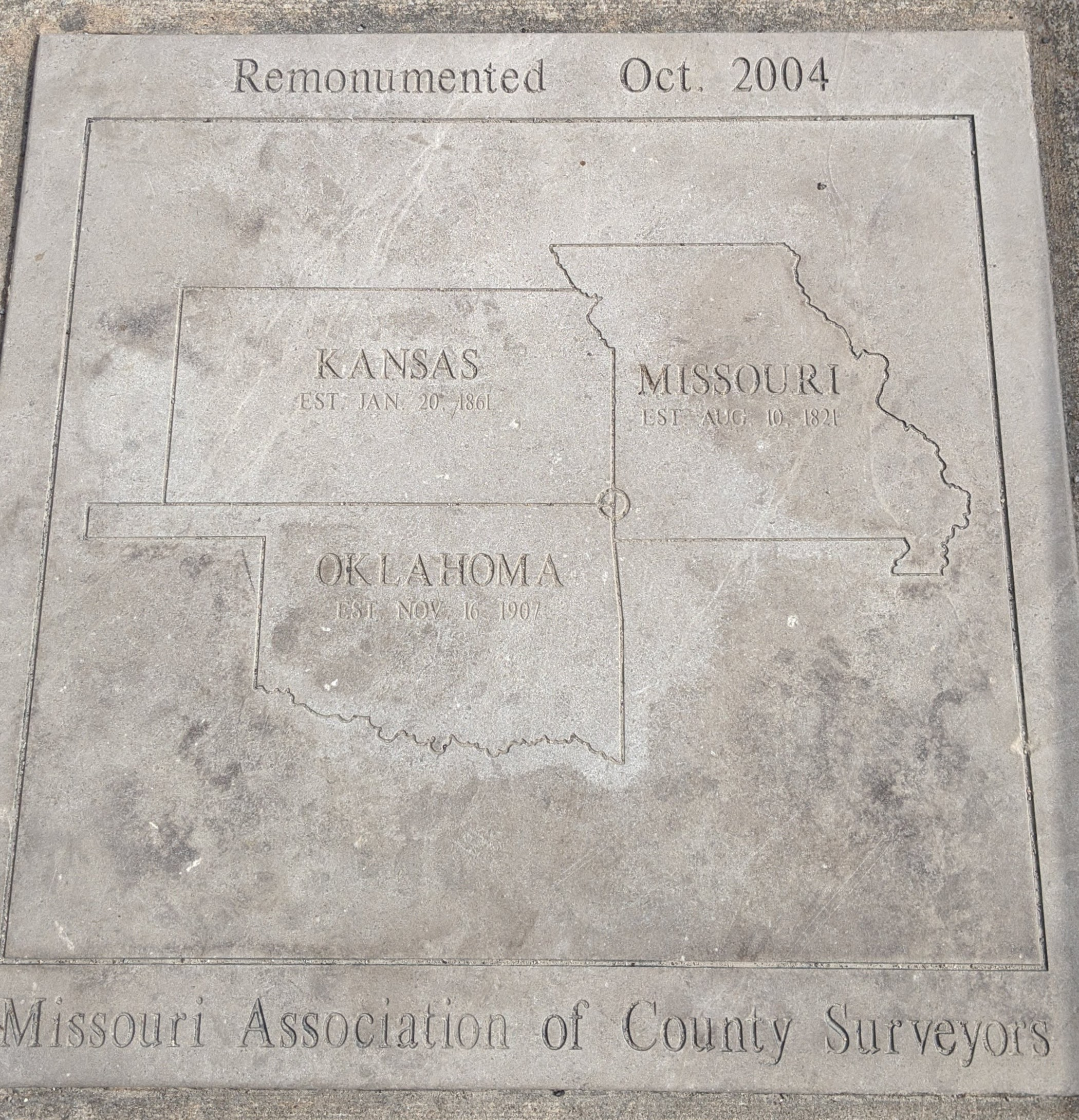
Kansas–Missouri–Oklahoma tripoint marker

State 1	State 2	State 3	Coordinates	Notes
Alabama	Florida	Georgia	31°0′2″N 85°0′8″W	Marker on Chattahoochee riverbank is actually a few feet above and west of true tripoint at high-water line.
Alabama	Georgia	Tennessee	34°59′5″N 85°36′19″W	Tri-State Corner. Marker on dry land at surface level and unmarked on lake in cavern directly below. Stolen in 2009 and returned two years later.
Arizona	Nevada	Utah	37°0′1″N 114°3′2″W	Marked with a red sandstone monument.
Arkansas	Louisiana	Mississippi	33°0′15″N 91°9′58″W	Probably unmarked on silt island in river sometimes connected to west bank by mud flat accreted by riprap.
Arkansas	Louisiana	Texas	33°1′9″N 94°2′35″W	Located in the Three States unincorporated community. Marker in process of being surrounded and absorbed by tree. See also: Ark-La-Tex
Arkansas	Missouri	Oklahoma	36°29′58″N 94°37′5″W	OKARMO Corner, marked with a stone monument.
Arkansas	Oklahoma	Texas	33°38′16″N 94°29′9″W	Unmarked on seasonal silt island or in river bed, but Oklahoma–Texas state line as revised in 2000 is defective in not extending from vegetation line on south bank to pre-established tripoint.
California	Nevada	Oregon	41°59′40″N 119°59′57″W	Marked with a cairn.
Colorado	Kansas	Nebraska	40°0′11″N 102°3′6″W	Marked with a brass disc.
Colorado	Kansas	Oklahoma	36°59′35″N 102°2′32″W	8 Mile Corner. Marker is concealed in crypt beneath removable manhole cover.
Colorado	Nebraska	Wyoming	41°0′5″N 104°3′12″W	Marked with a stone surrounded by a three-stone colored base.
Colorado	New Mexico	Oklahoma	37°0′0″N 103°0′8″W	Preston Monument
Colorado	Utah	Wyoming	41°0′2″N 109°3′0″W	Marked.
Connecticut	Massachusetts	New York	42°2′59″N 73°29′14″W	See Brace Mountain or Mount Frissell. Marked with a stone inscribed with MASS-1898-NY and a scratched-on CONN.
Connecticut	Massachusetts	Rhode Island	42°0′29″N 71°47′57″W	See Thompson, Connecticut. Marked with a stone inscribed with MASS-CONN-RI.
Delaware	Maryland	Pennsylvania	39°43′20″N 75°47′19″W	Marked by the Tri-State Monument, inscribed with M-M-P-P. See Delaware Wedge.
Georgia	North Carolina	Tennessee	34°59′18″N 84°19′19″W	Marked.
Idaho	Montana	Wyoming	44°28′27″N 111°2′56″W	Located within Yellowstone National Park. Marked, although difficult to access.
Idaho	Nevada	Oregon	42°0′1″N 117°1′34″W	Marked with a three-sided stone inscribed with N-I-O on the respective faces.
Idaho	Nevada	Utah	41°59′37″N 114°2′30″W	Marked with a granite monument inscribed with the respective states' names.
Idaho	Utah	Wyoming	42°0′6″N 111°2′48″W	Marked with a stone.
Indiana	Michigan	Ohio	41°41′46″N 84°48′22″W	Brass marker with the shapes of the three states is located in a monument box beneath the surface of a rural road. Was set in 1999 and is referenced by a granite marker 20 feet to the east on the Michigan-Ohio line.
Iowa	Minnesota	South Dakota	43°30′1″N 96°27′12″W	True point is marked with a disc in the center of a T-shaped road intersection. A witness monument nearby in the South Dakota corner acknowledges the tri-point being set in 1859.
Kansas	Missouri	Oklahoma	36°59′55″N 94°37′5″W	OKKAMO Tri-State Marker, marked with a plaque on a seldom used dead-end road.
Kentucky	Tennessee	Virginia	36°36′3″N 83°40′32″W	Tri-State Peak Located within Cumberland Gap National Historical Park. Marked.
Kentucky	Virginia	West Virginia	37°32′17″N 81°58′5″W	Marked with a USCG marker on top of a two-foot high iron pipe at the river's high point.
Maryland	Pennsylvania	West Virginia	39°43′16″N 79°28′36″W	Marked with a pyramid-like stone.
Massachusetts	New Hampshire	Vermont	42°43′37″N 72°27′30″W	Marker is technically on dry land, but buried within river bed due to a dam's construction downstream.
Massachusetts	New York	Vermont	42°44′45″N 73°15′54″W	Marked with a stone.
Minnesota	North Dakota	South Dakota	45°56′7″N 96°33′49″W	Near the Bois de Sioux River
Montana	North Dakota	South Dakota	45°56′43″N 104°2′44″W	Marked with a red granite stone.
Montana	South Dakota	Wyoming	44°59′51″N 104°3′28″W	Marked with a stone within a fence.
Nebraska	South Dakota	Wyoming	43°0′2″N 104°3′11″W	Marked with a stone within a fence.
New Jersey	New York	Pennsylvania	41°21′27″N 74°41′42″W	Marked by the Tri-States Monument in Port Jervis, New York, at the confluence of the Delaware and Neversink rivers.
New Mexico	Oklahoma	Texas	36°30′1″N 103°0′9″W	Texhomex Marker
North Carolina	Tennessee	Virginia	36°35′17″N 81°40′39″W	North Carolina–Tennessee–Virginia Corners - Marked.

== Water ==
State 1	State 2	State 3	Coordinates	Water	Notes
Alabama	Mississippi	Tennessee	34°59′44″N 88°12′0″W	Tennessee River	
Arizona	California	Nevada	35°0′7″N 114°38′1″W	Colorado River	
Arkansas	Mississippi	Tennessee	34°59′44″N 90°18′33″W	Mississippi River	Memphis, Tennessee metro area.
Arkansas	Missouri	Tennessee	36°0′2″N 89°43′59″W	Mississippi River	
Connecticut	New York	Rhode Island	41°18′16″N 71°54′26″W	Long Island Sound	The part of New York that is in this tri-state area is Fishers Island. It is the New London, Connecticut metro area.
Delaware	New Jersey	Pennsylvania	39°48′7″N 75°24′54″W	Delaware River	
Georgia	North Carolina	South Carolina	35°0′2″N 83°6′31″W	Chatooga River	Located in river very near marker on dry land.
Idaho	Oregon	Washington	45°59′43″N 116°54′58″W	Snake River	
Illinois	Indiana	Kentucky	37°47′57″N 88°1′41″W	Wabash River and Ohio River	Evansville, Indiana metro area. See Illinois–Indiana–Kentucky tri-state area. One of 5 natural border tripoints in the U.S. meaning all 3 points are formed by a river, there are no invisible lines used to make this part of the border.
Illinois	Indiana	Michigan	41°45′39″N 87°12′28″W	Lake Michigan	Known as either the Indiana Dunes or the Michigan Dunes Area
Illinois	Iowa	Wisconsin	42°30′30″N 90°38′27″W	Mississippi River	Dubuque, Iowa metro area.
Illinois	Kentucky	Missouri	36°58′51″N 89°8′3″W	Mississippi River and Ohio River	Little Egypt region popularly labeled as a tri-state area with St. Louis, Missouri, Carbondale, Illinois metro area and Paducah, Kentucky being its nuclei. One of 5 natural border tripoints in the U.S. meaning all 3 points are formed by a river, there are no invisible lines used to make this part of the border.
Illinois	Michigan	Wisconsin	42°29′37″N 87°1′12″W	Lake Michigan	
Indiana	Kentucky	Ohio	39°6′20″N 84°49′13″W	Ohio River	Cincinnati metro area. The tripoint is near, but not precisely at, the confluence with the Great Miami River.
Iowa	Illinois	Missouri	40°22′42″N 91°25′10″W	Mississippi River and Des Moines River	Border with Lee County, Iowa One of 5 natural border tripoints in the U.S. meaning all 3 points are formed by a river, there are no invisible lines used to make this part of the border.
Iowa	Minnesota	Wisconsin	43°30′2″N 91°13′4″W	Mississippi River	La Crosse, Wisconsin metro area. Was apparently marked at one time with a sign that had been anchored in the location, but that sign has since been moved as of 2001.
Iowa	Missouri	Nebraska	40°35′7″N 95°45′56″W	Missouri River	
Iowa	Nebraska	South Dakota	42°29′26″N 96°26′44″W	Big Sioux River and Missouri River	Sioux City, Iowa metro area. One of 5 natural border tripoints in the U.S. meaning all 3 points are formed by a river, there are no invisible lines used to make this part of the border.
Kansas	Missouri	Nebraska	40°0′0″N 95°18′30″W	Missouri River	
Kentucky	Missouri	Tennessee	36°29′54″N 89°32′22″W; 36°29′52″N 89°29′6″W; 36°29′57″N 89°25′6″W	Mississippi River	Three separate tripoints, due to meanders of the river (though probably only a single tri-state area surrounding them all). See also Kentucky Bend.
Kentucky	Ohio	West Virginia	38°25′18″N 82°35′45″W	Big Sandy River and Ohio River	Huntington (W.V.)-Ashland (Ky.)-Ironton (Oh.) Tri-State region. One of 5 natural border tripoints in the U.S. meaning all 3 points are formed by a river, there are no invisible lines used to make this part of the border.
Maryland	Virginia	West Virginia	39°19′17″N 77°43′8″W	Potomac River	Unmarked, at high water mark, because the Maryland West Virginia state line is at the high water mark even tho the Maryland Virginia state line runs generally along the low water line, so perhaps misclassified here because it is rarely actually under water.
Michigan	Minnesota	Wisconsin	47°17′28″N 89°57′26″W	Lake Superior	
Ohio	Pennsylvania	West Virginia	40°38′20″N 80°31′8″W	Ohio River	Technically the Beginning Point of the U.S. Public Land Survey, although the actual monument is 1,112 feet north of the tripoint due to the tripoint's current location under water; Pittsburgh Tri-State.

== See also ==
- Four Corners Monument – a quadripoint between the states of Arizona, Colorado, New Mexico, and Utah
