= Survey marker =

Object placed to mark a point

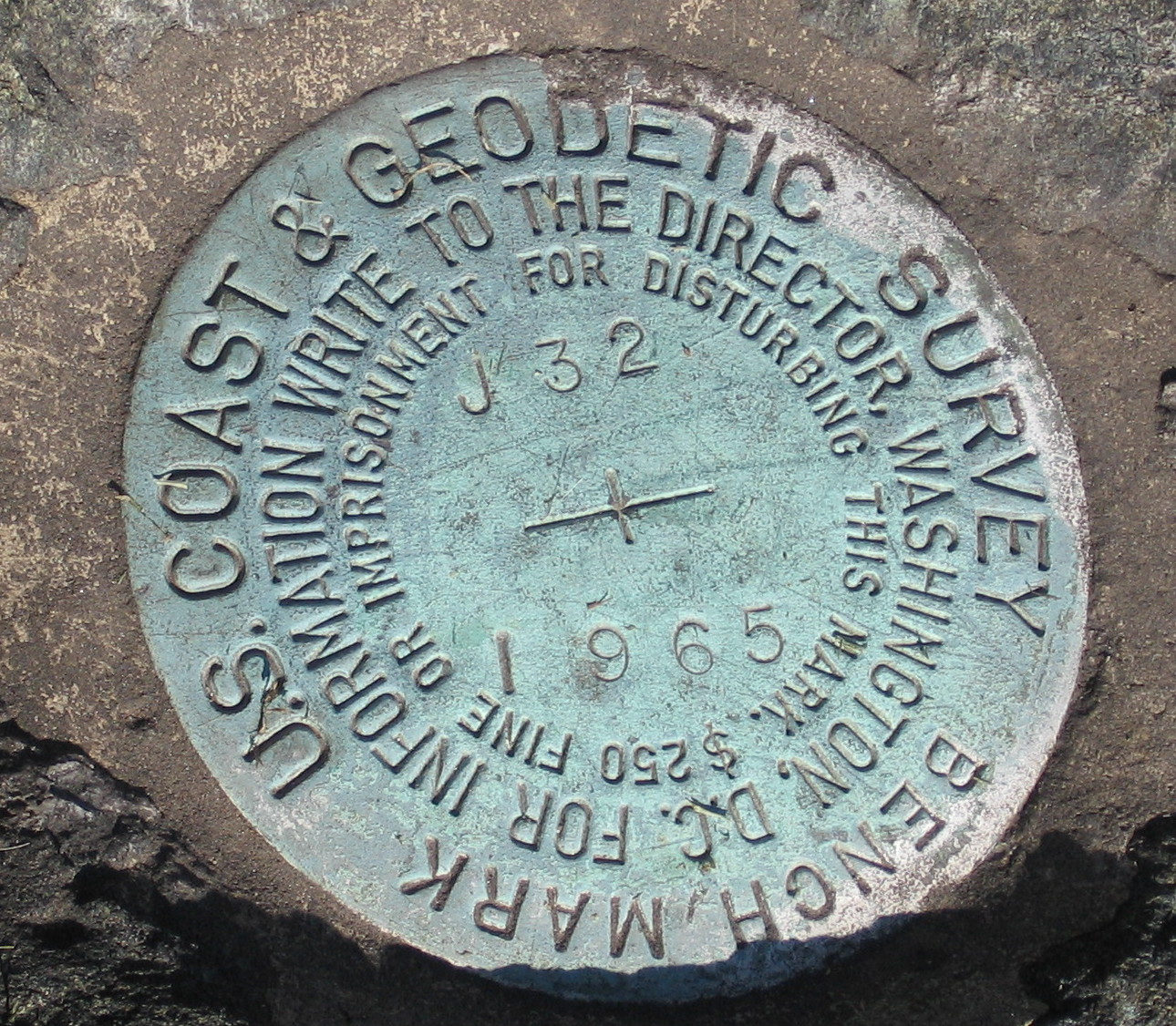
Closeup of a United States Coast and Geodetic Survey marker.

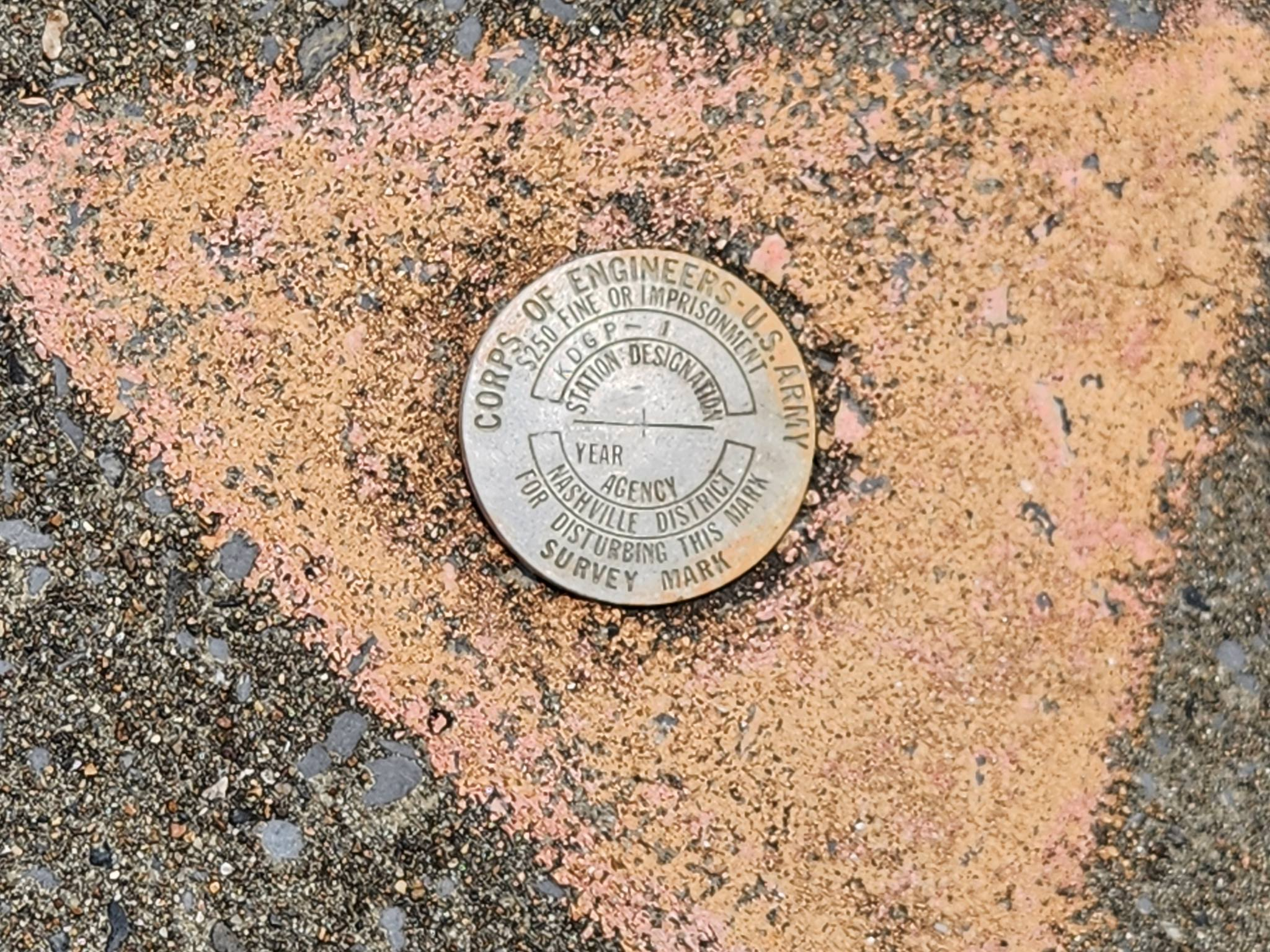
United States Army Corps of Engineers Survey Marker

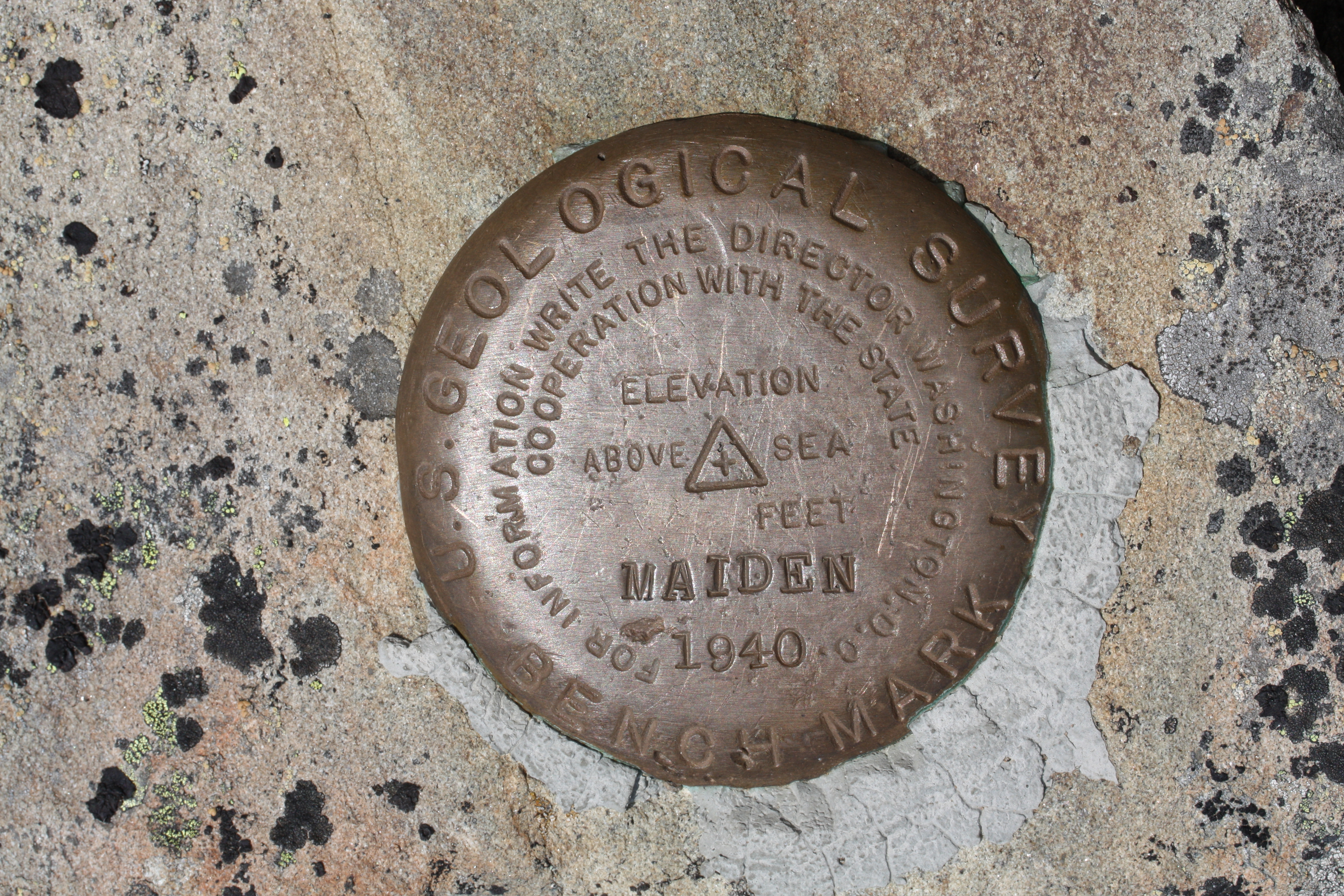
Marker for triangulation station, indicated by triangle in center

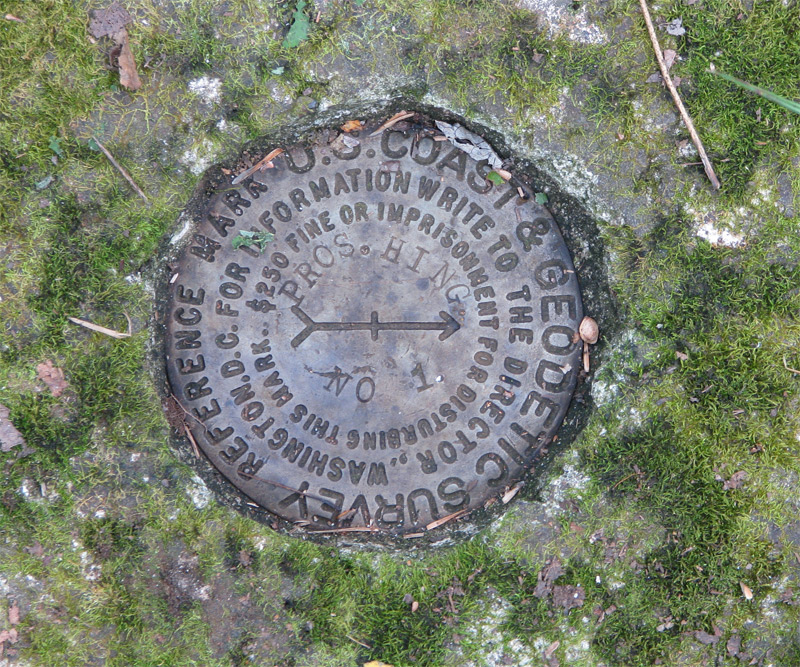
Reference marker for triangulation station in upper photo

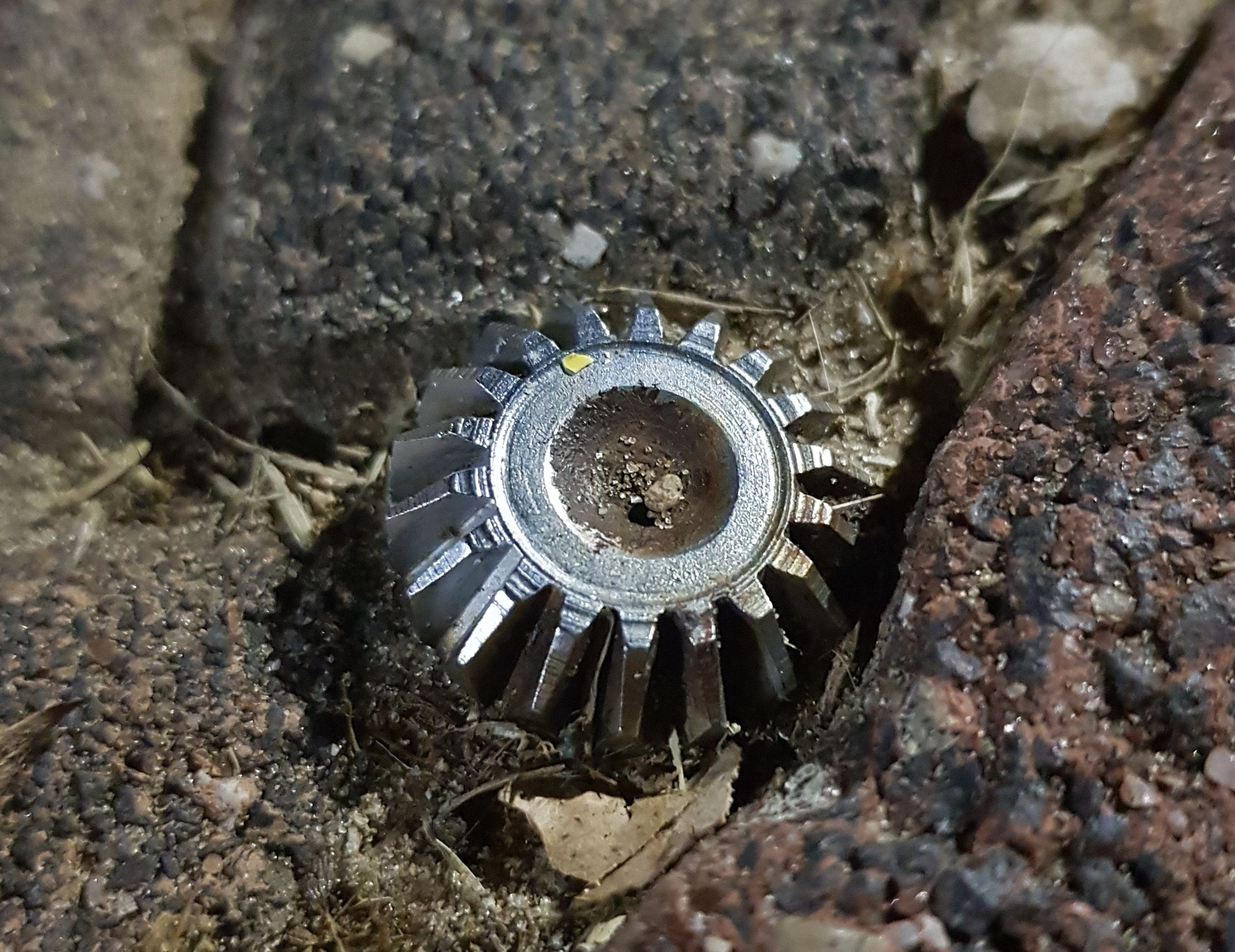
A cotton spindle spike in Tel Aviv pavement, used as a marker for public area cadastral surveying.

In surveying and geodesy, a marker (also called a mark, monument, or station) is an object firmly installed to indicate points on the Earth's surface with known coordinates. A benchmark is a type of survey marker that indicates elevation (vertical position). Horizontal position markers used for triangulation are also known as triangulation stations. A set of interrelated geodetic markers form a geodetic network. An active station or reference station is occupied permanently with a measurement instrument, such as GPS/GNSS continuously operating reference stations (CORS). Benchmarking or trigpointing is the hobby of searching for these marks.

A USGS bench mark disk embedded in bedrock at 37°10'45.3"N 86°06'32.0"W, Mammoth Cave National Park, Kentucky; the blank elevation field and "Write the Director, Washington D.C." inscription indicate a late 19th or early 20th century marker, predating standardized pre-stamped survey disks.

== Types ==
All sorts of different objects, ranging from the familiar brass disks to liquor bottles, clay pots, and rock cairns, have been used over the years as survey markers. Some markers have been used to designate tripoints, or the meeting points of three or more countries. In the 19th century, these marks were often drill holes in rock ledges, crosses or triangles chiseled in rock, or copper or brass bolts sunk into bedrock.

Today in the United States, the most common geodetic survey marks are cast metal disks with stamped legends on their face set in rock ledges, embedded in the tops of concrete pillars, or affixed to the tops of pipes that have been sunk into the ground. These marks are intended to be permanent, and disturbing them is generally prohibited by federal and state law.

Survey markers in Nagoya, Japan, which bear stylized images of shachihoko, are noted for their elaborate design.

== History ==
Survey markers were often placed as part of triangulation surveys, measurement efforts that moved systematically across states or regions, establishing the angles and distances between various points. Such surveys laid the basis for map-making across the world.

Geodetic survey markers were often set in groups. For example, in triangulation surveys, the primary point identified was called the triangulation station, or the "main station". It was often marked by a "station disk", a brass disk with a triangle inscribed on its surface and an impressed mark that indicated the precise point over which a surveyor's plumb-bob should be dropped to assure a precise location over it. A triangulation station was often surrounded by several (usually three) reference marks (see second photo at left), each of which bore an arrow that pointed back towards the main station. These reference marks made it easier for later visitors to "recover" (or re-find) the primary ("station") mark. Reference marks also made it possible to replace (or reset) a station mark that had been disturbed or destroyed.

Some old station marks were buried several feet down (to protect them from being struck by ploughs). Occasionally, these buried marks had surface marks set directly above them.

== Database ==
In the U.S., survey marks that meet certain standards for accuracy are part of a national database that is maintained by the National Geodetic Survey (NGS), the successor agency to the United States Coast and Geodetic Survey (USC&GS). Each station mark in the database has a PID (Permanent IDentifier), a unique 6-character code that can be used to call up a datasheet describing that station. The NGS has a web-based form that can be used to access any datasheet, if the station's PID is known. Alternatively, datasheets can be called up by station name.

A typical datasheet has either the precise or the estimated coordinates. Precise coordinates are called "adjusted" and result from precise surveys.

A survey marker for the Instituto Nacional de Estadística y Geografía in Mexico.

Estimated coordinates are termed "scaled" and have usually been set by locating the point on a map and reading off its latitude and longitude. Scaled coordinates can be as much as several thousand feet distant from the true positions of their marks. In the U.S., some survey markers have the latitude and longitude of the station mark, a listing of any reference marks (with their distance and bearing from the station mark), and a narrative (which is updated over the years) describing other reference features (e.g., buildings, roadways, trees, or fire hydrants) and the distance and/or direction of these features from the marks, and giving a history of past efforts to recover (or re-find) these marks (including any resets of the marks, or evidence of their damage or destruction).

Current best practice for stability of new survey markers is to use a punch mark stamped in the top of a metal rod driven deep into the ground, surrounded by a grease filled sleeve, and covered with a hinged cap set in concrete.

Survey markers are now often used to set up a GPS receiver antenna in a known position for use in Differential GPS surveying.

In Brazil, a similar database is operated by the Brazilian Institute of Geography and Statistics.

== See also ==
- Benchmark (surveying), a surveying mark used as a reference point in measuring altitudes
- Boundary marker
- Milestone
- Triangulation station, a surveying mark used for horizontal positioning
