= De Mars =

De Mars may refer to:

- De Mars (surname)
- De Mars, Gelderland, Dutch hamlet
- De Mars, De Blesse, Dutch smock mill

== See also ==
- DeMar
- Champ de Mars (disambiguation)
