= DeMars =

DeMars (and variants) is a surname. Notable people with the surname include:

- AnnMaria De Mars (born 1958), American technology executive, author and Judoka
- Billy DeMars (1925–2020), American baseball shortstop and coach
- Bruce DeMars, United States Navy four star admiral
- Hélène-Louise Demars (c. 1736–1778), French composer
- Jean-Odéo Demars (1695–1756), French organist and harpsichordist
- Lina van de Mars (born 1979), German TV moderator
- Nicole Demars (born 1970), Canadian road cyclist
- Vernon DeMars (1908–2005), American architect and professor

== See also ==
- DeMar
