= Damar =

Damar may refer to:

== Places ==
- Damar Island, Maluku Province, Indonesia
  - Mount Wurlali, also known as Mount Damar, a stratovolcano on the island
- Amaro, Friuli (Friulian: Damâr), a commune in Italy
- Damar, Quezon City, Philippines, a barangay
- Damar, Murgul, Turkey, a mining village in Artvin Province
  - Damar mine
- Damar, Lice, a neighbourhood in the Lice District of Diyarbakır Province, Turkey
- Damar, Kansas, United States, a city
- Dhamar, Yemen (romanized: Ḏamār), a city

== People ==
- Amar Singh Damar (1925–1999), Indian politician
- Germaine Damar (born 1929), Luxembourger actress and dancer
- Muhammed Damar (born 2004), German footballer
- Damar Forbes (born 1990), Jamaican long jumper
- Damar Hamlin (born 1998), American football player
- Damar Thomas (born 2004), English boxer

== Arts and entertainment ==
- Damar (Star Trek), a fictional character in Star Trek: Deep Space Nine
- Damar, a fictional land in fantasy novels by Robin McKinley
- "Damar", a 2020 single by Mustafa Sandal - see Mustafa Sandal discography

== See also ==
- Dhamar (disambiguation)
- Damar gum, a resin produced by the tree family Dipterocarpaceae
- DeMar
