= Campus Martius (disambiguation) =

Campus Martius may refer to:

- Campus Martius, the "Field of Mars" in ancient Rome
- Campus Martius (Ohio), an 18th-century fortification
- Campus Martius Museum, on the site of the Campus Martius fort in Ohio
- Campus Martius Park in Detroit, Michigan
  - Campus Martius station, a QLine stop serving the park
- Campus Martius, Latin name for the Marchfield (assembly)

== See also ==
- Campo Marzio, a rione of Rome
- Field of Mars (disambiguation)
- Champ de Mars (disambiguation)
- Campo Marte (disambiguation)
