= Märzfeld =

Märzfeld ('March field' in German) may refer to:

- Marchfield (assembly), a Frankish and Lombard institution
- one of the Nazi party rally grounds
