= Campo Marte (disambiguation) =

Campo Marte ("Mars Field"), Campo de Marte, Campo di Marte or variant may refer to:

- Campo Marte, equestrian venue in Mexico City, Mexico
- Campo de Marte (SBMT), airport in São Paulo, Brazil
- El Campo de Marte, park in Lima, Peru
- "Campo Marte", a train station in Padova, Italy, on the Milan–Venice railway
- Campo di Marte, a train station in Florence (Firenze), Italy
- Campo Marte (Mexico City Metrobús), a BRT station

== See also ==
- Field of Mars (disambiguation)
- Champ de Mars (disambiguation)
- Campus Martius (disambiguation)
