= Petek, Murgul =

Petek
- Village
- Location within Turkey
- Coordinates: 41°15′36″N 41°32′41″E
- Country: Turkey
- Province: Artvin
- District: Murgul
- Population (2021): 131
- Time zone: UTC+3 (TRT)

Petek is a village in the Murgul District, Artvin Province, Turkey. Its population is 131 (2021). It is located about 7 kilometres (4.3 mi) southwest of the town of Murgul. Its economy is based on agriculture and animal husbandry.
