= Ohio Company Land Office =

- U.S. National Register of Historic Places
- U.S. Historic district – Contributing property
- Campus Martius State Memorial
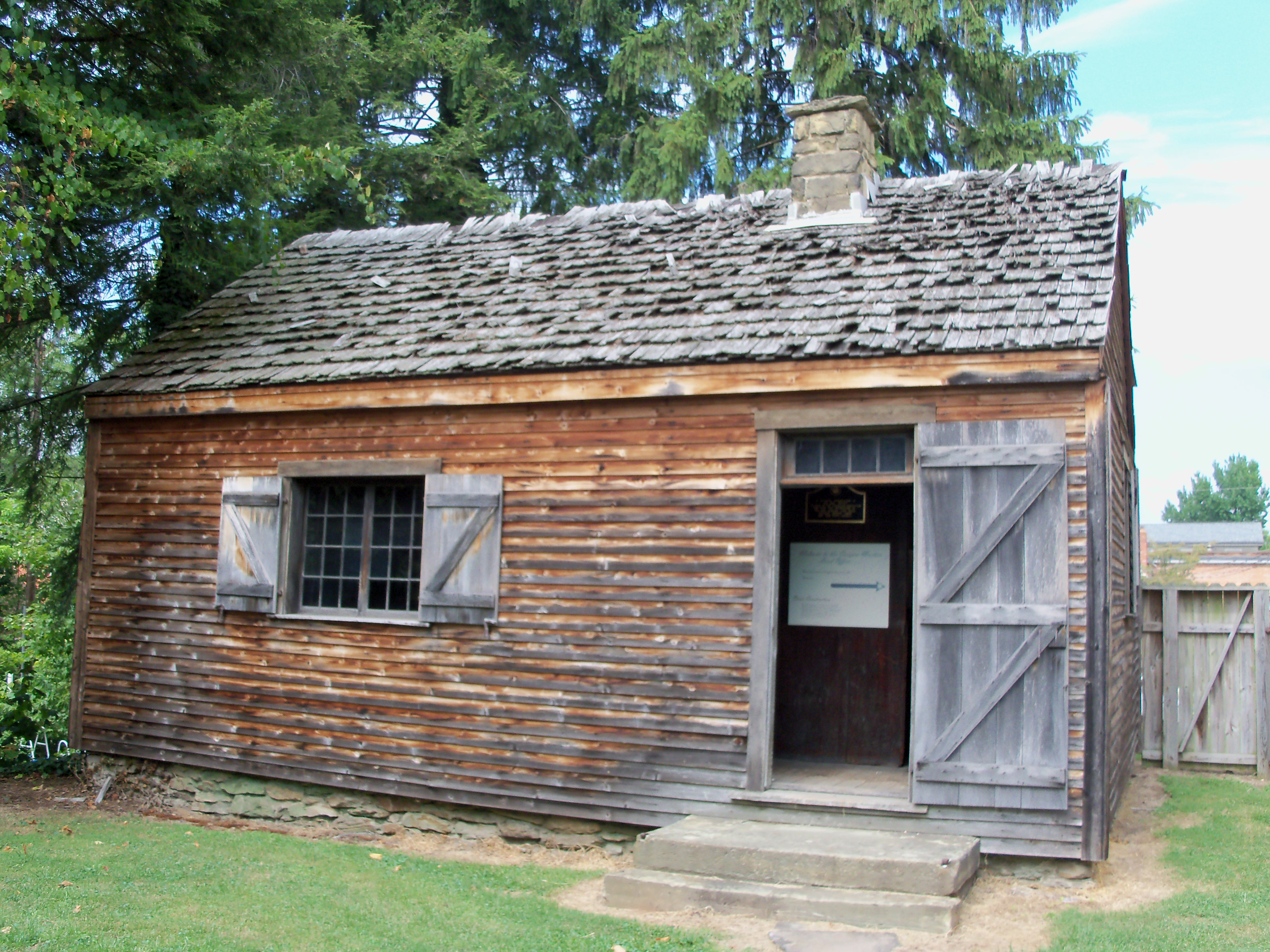

- Location within Ohio Location within the United States
- Location: Washington and 2nd Sts., Campus Martius Museum, Marietta, Ohio
- Coordinates: 39°25′16.75″N 81°27′41.5″W
- Area: less than one acre
- Built: 1788
- Architect: Ohio Company of Associates
- Architectural style: Log office building
- Part of: Marietta Historic District (ID70000523)
- NRHP reference No.: 70000523

Significant dates
- Added to NRHP: November 10, 1970
- Designated CP: 1974

The Ohio Company Land Office is one of the original buildings of the city of Marietta, Ohio, United States. The Office is listed individually in the National Register of Historic Places and as a contributing property to the Marietta Historic District.

The Land Office was built after Ohio Company of Associates landed at Marietta in 1788. The Office was built at approximately 39°25′16.75″N 81°27′47.25″W. In 1791 the building was moved away from the Muskingum River so it could be protected by the guns of Campus Martius. From this location, Ohio Company surveyors plotted the company's entire purchase in southeastern Ohio, more than 900,000 acres (360,000 ha) in total, under the direction of Rufus Putnam as the company's chief.

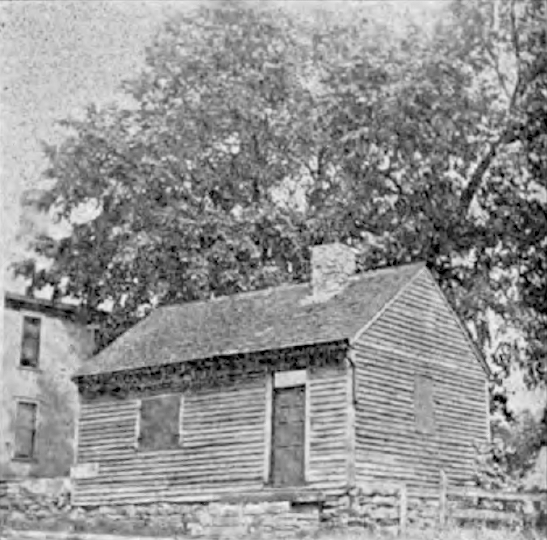
The Ohio Company Office as seen in 1903 on Washington Street between Front Street and Second Street

The building is a simple log structure with a gabled roof, pierced by a single chimney; one window is set into the side, and the front has space for just one window and the main entrance. Its location on a slope permits the slight exposure of the foundation on one side. Smaller elements include shutters for the windows and a pair of steps that provide access to the main entrance. As the oldest extant building anywhere in Ohio, the land office had become the focus of significant attention by the opening years of the twentieth century, with organizations such as Marietta's historical society devoting extensive effort to ensure its preservation.

The building is now part of the Campus Martius Museum complex.
