= Dhamar =

Dhamar may refer to:

== Places ==
- Dhamar Governorate, Yemen
  - Dhamar, Yemen
  - Thamar University
- Dhamar, Rohtak, India

== Other uses ==
- Dhamar (music), one of the talas used in Hindustani classical music

== See also ==
- Damar (disambiguation)
- Dahmer (disambiguation)
