= Ardıçlı, Murgul =

Ardıçlı Durça
- Village
- Location within Turkey
- Coordinates: 41.2811°N 41.5858°E
- Country: Turkey
- Province: Artvin
- District: Murgul
- Municipality: Osmanlı
- Established: March 16, 1921
- Area: 0.23 km^{2} (0.089 sq mi)
- Elevation: 670 m (2,200 ft)
- Highest elevation: 745 m (2,444 ft)
- Lowest elevation: 620 m (2,030 ft)
- Population (2023): 112
  - Density: 490/km^{2} (1,300/sq mi)
- Time zone: UTC+3 (TRT)
- Area code: 08590

Ardıçlı is a village in the Murgul District, Artvin Province, Turkey. Its population is 112 (2023).

== Population ==
Findings by the Russians in 1886 and the Ankara Government in 1922 show that the village was made up of Georgians. Consequently, many of the landmarks and places in the Ardıçlı village have Georgian names.

Historical population
Year	Pop.	±% p.a.
2007	113	—
2012	67	−9.93%
2017	90	+6.08%
2023	112	+3.71%
Source: TÜİK (2007-2023)
