= Erenköy =

Erenköy may refer to:

- Erenköy, Çanakkale, a town in the central (Çanakkale) district of Çanakkale Province, Turkey
- Erenköy, Kadıköy, a neighborhood of the city of Istanbul, Turkey
- Erenköy, Murgul, a village in the district of Murgul, Artvin Province, Turkey
- Erenköy, Yusufeli, a village in the district of Yusufeli, Artvin Province, Turkey
- Kokkina exclave, an exclave Turkish village in western Cyprus, whose Turkish name is Erenköy

== See also ==
- tr:Erenköy, a more extensive list in Turkish Wikipedia
