= Field of Mars =

The term Field of Mars (Latin: Campus Martius) goes back to antiquity, and designates an area, inside or near a city, used as a parade or exercise ground by the military.

Notable examples of places which were used for these purposes include:

- Campus Martius, an area in ancient Rome
- Champ de Mars, a large public space in front of the Military Academy in Paris
- Field of Mars (Saint Petersburg), a square in Saint Petersburg

Modern-day examples of places which have been given this name include:

- Campo Marte, a venue for military, government and equestrian events in Mexico City
- Field of Mars Reserve, bushland in New South Wales, Australia
- Pedion tou Areos, a large public park in Athens
- Field of Mars, the military section of the Lychakiv Cemetery in Lviv

== See also ==
- Mars (disambiguation)
- Champ de Mars (disambiguation)
- Campus Martius (disambiguation)
- Campo Marte (disambiguation)
- Marchfield (assembly)
- Mars (oil platform), an oil field in the Gulf of Mexico
