= Murgul mine =

Copper mine in Turkey

- Location: Murgul, Artvin Province, Turkey
- Products: Copper
- Opened: 1951
- Company: Etibank

The Murgul mine is a large mine in the east of Turkey in Artvin Province 465 km east of the capital, Ankara. Murgul represents one of the largest copper reserve in Turkey having estimated reserves of 40 million tonnes of ore grading 1.25% copper. The 40 million tonnes of ore contains 500,000 tonnes of copper metal.
