= Champ de Mars (disambiguation) =

Champ de Mars is a large public greenspace in Paris, France.

Champ de Mars may also refer to:

- Champ de Mars station (Paris Metro), a ghost station on line 8
- Champ de Mars–Tour Eiffel station, a rail station in Paris
- Champ de Mars (Montreal), a public park in Quebec, Canada
  - Champ-de-Mars station (Montreal Metro), a subway station
- Champ de Mars (Haiti), a public square in Port-au-Prince, Haiti
- Champ de Mars Racecourse, a horse race track in Port Louis, Mauritius
- Champ de Mars: A Story of War, a 2009 play by Pierre-Michel Tremblay

== See also ==
- Campo Marte (disambiguation)
- Campus Martius (disambiguation)
- Champ de Mars massacre, a massacre during the French Revolution
- De Mars (disambiguation)
- Field of Mars (disambiguation)
