= Demarre =

Demarre is a surname of Norman and French origin. Notable people with the name include:

- DeMarre Carroll (born 1986), American basketball player
- Demarre McGill (born 1975), American classical musician

== See also ==
- DeMar, given name and surname
- Dermarr, given name
