= Damar mine =

Copper mine in Turkey

- Location: Murgul, Artvin Province, Turkey
- Products: Copper
- Opened: 1968
- Company: Etibank

The Damar mine is a large mine in the east of Turkey in Artvin Province, 465 km east of the capital, Ankara. Damar represents one of the largest copper reserves in Turkey having estimated reserves of 15 million tonnes of ore grading 1.11%. The 15 million tonnes of ore contains 167,000 tonnes of copper metal.
