= Akantaş, Murgul =

Turkish village

Akantaş
- Village
- Location within Turkey
- Coordinates: 41°18′N 41°37′E
- Country: Turkey
- Province: Artvin
- District: Murgul
- Population (2021): 153
- Time zone: UTC+3 (TRT)

Akantaş (Georgian: ბუჯური, romanized: bujuri) is a village in the Murgul District, Artvin Province, Turkey. Its population is 153 (2021).
