= Korucular, Murgul =

Korucular
- Village
- Location within Turkey
- Coordinates: 41.3008°N 41.6442°E
- Country: Turkey
- Province: Artvin
- District: Murgul
- Population (2021): 118
- Time zone: UTC+3 (TRT)

Korucular is a village in the Murgul District, Artvin Province, Turkey. Its population is 118 (2021).
