= Kabaca, Murgul =

Kabaca
- Village
- Location within Turkey
- Coordinates: 41.2260°N 41.5453°E
- Country: Turkey
- Province: Artvin
- District: Murgul
- Population (2021): 73
- Time zone: UTC+3 (TRT)

Kabaca is a village in the Murgul District, Artvin Province, Turkey. Its population is 73 (2021).
