= Washington County Courthouse (Ohio) =

Local government building in the United States

- U.S. Historic district – Contributing property
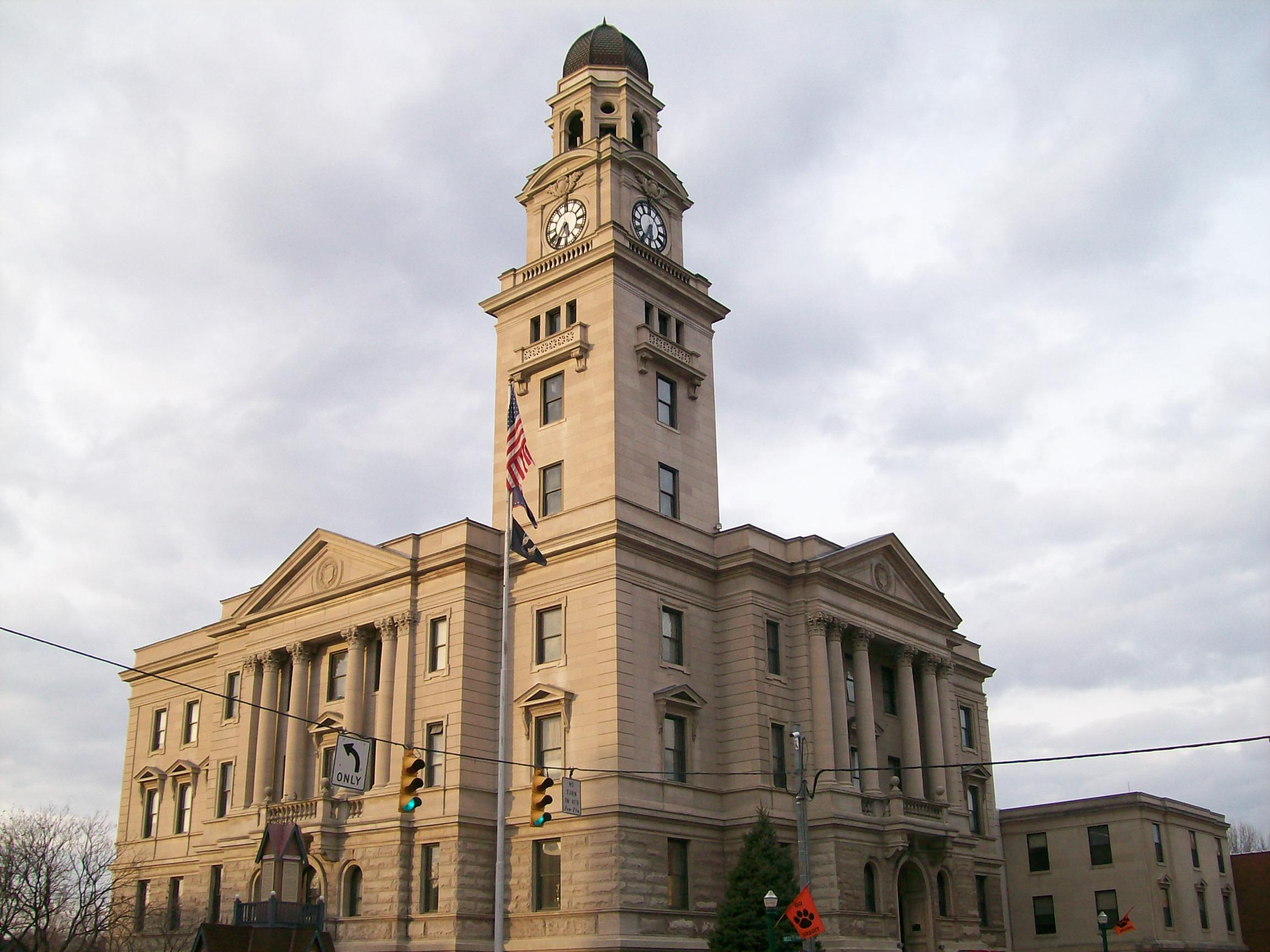
- The courthouse in March, 2010.

- Location within Ohio Location within the United States
- Interactive map showing the location of Washington County Courthouse
- Location: North corner of 2nd and Putnam Streets in Marietta, Ohio
- Coordinates: 39.415819°N 81.454589°W
- Area: 450 acres (180 ha)
- Built: 1902
- Architect: Samuel Hannaford & Sons
- Part of: Marietta Historic District (Marietta, Ohio) (ID74001646)
- Designated CP: December 19, 1974

The Washington County Courthouse is located at 205 Putnam Street in Marietta, Ohio. The courthouse is constructed of rusticated stone blocks for the foundation with smooth blocks rising to the roofline. The courthouse is the third for the county. The courthouse was designed and constructed by Samuel Hannaford & Sons, the same architects on the Monroe County Courthouse. The courthouse is included in the Marietta Historic District, which was added to the National Register on December 19, 1974.
