= DeMar =

DeMar (and variants) can be a surname and given name. Notable people with the name include:

== Surname ==
- Anibal de Mar (1908–1980), Cuban radio actor
- Claire Démar (1799–1833), French feminist, journalist and writer
- Clarence DeMar (1888–1958), American marathon runner
- Enoch DeMar (born 1980), American football offensive lineman
- Gary DeMar, American writer, lecturer, and Christian theologian
- Larry DeMar, video game and pinball designer
- Matyáš Démar (born 1991), Czech volleyball player
- Penny Demar (born 1952), American politician
- Sébastien Demar (1763–1832), German pianist and composer

== Given name ==
- DeMar DeRozan (born 1989), American basketball player
- Demar Dotson (born 1985), American football offensive tackle
- Demar Phillips (born 1983), Jamaican footballer
- Demar Rose (born 1996), Jamaican footballer
- Demar Stewart (born 1984), Jamaican footballer

== See also ==
- Damar (disambiguation)
- Demarre, given name
- DeMars, surname
- DerMarr Johnson (born 1980), American basketball coach and retired NBA player
