= Çimenli, Murgul =

Çimenli
- Village
- Location within Turkey
- Country: Turkey
- Province: Artvin
- District: Murgul
- Population (2021): 66
- Time zone: UTC+3 (TRT)

Çimenli is a village in the Murgul District, Artvin Province, Turkey. Its population is 66 (2021).
