= Küre, Murgul =

Küre
- Village
- Location within Turkey
- Coordinates: 41.2939°N 41.5664°E
- Country: Turkey
- Province: Artvin
- District: Murgul
- Population (2021): 102
- Time zone: UTC+3 (TRT)

Küre is a village in the Murgul District, Artvin Province, Turkey. Its population is 102 (2021).
