= Rufus Putnam House =

Historic house in Ohio, United States

- U.S. National Register of Historic Places
- U.S. Historic district – Contributing property
- Campus Martius State Memorial
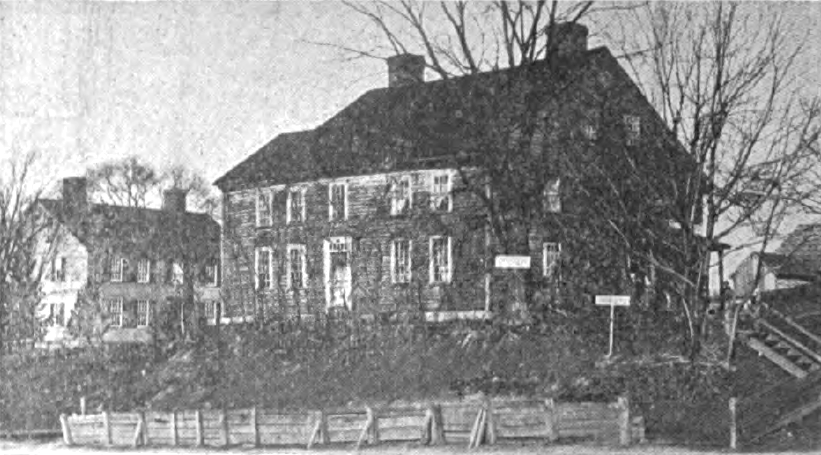
- 1903 photograph of the house

- Location within Ohio Location within the United States
- Location: Campus Martius Museum, corner of 2nd and Washington Sts., Marietta, Ohio
- Coordinates: 39°25′16.5″N 81°27′40.0″W
- Area: less than one acre
- Built: 1788
- Part of: Marietta Historic District (ID74001646)
- NRHP reference No.: 70000524

Significant dates
- Added to NRHP: November 10, 1970
- Designated CP: 1974

The Rufus Putnam House, also known as Campus Martius or Campus Martius Museum State Memorial, is a historic building in Marietta, Ohio. It was built as part of the Campus Martius fortification by General Rufus Putnam, during the early settlement of Ohio by the Ohio Company of Associates.

The building is listed in the National Register of Historic Places individually, and it is also a contributing property of the Marietta Historic District. The building is the only surviving part of the Campus Martius fortification and has been enclosed inside the Campus Martius Museum building.

The house has been called "the most outstanding architectural combination of New England tradition and frontier necessity preserved in Ohio today."

== History ==
Construction began soon after Putnam arrived in 1788 using a building method known as post-and-plank or corner post construction. Each wall of the building was built prefabricated. Four-inch-thick by foot-wide hewn oak timbers were mortised and tenoned, and fastened with wooden dowels into a diagonal braced frame. Random-width four-inch-thick planks were fitted to complete the wall lying on the ground. Each plank was numbered with Roman numerals, then removed so the frame could be raised, and then re-assembled. Eight by eight-inch oak floor joists with neither foundation nor basement were used, and tulip poplar floor boards were laid, but not fastened until seasoned.

The building was completed late in 1790. The green planks used in original construction shrank, and it was necessary to wedge lath into the cracks, until clapboard was applied later. With the end of the Northwest Indian War, the Campus Martius fortification was no longer necessary, and Putnam bought the adjacent blockhouse, and used the lumber to add a four-room addition to the original four-room house in 1795.

Putnam's wife died in 1820; he stayed in the house till he died in 1824. After Putnam's daughter Elizabeth died in 1831, the house was sold to the Nye family, who occupied it for many years, followed by tenants late in the 19th century. The Marietta Chapter of the Daughters of the American Revolution leased the building starting in 1905. In 1917, the state bought the Campus Martius site, and placed it under the control of the Ohio Historical Society. Few Putnam pieces remain to decorate the interior, so other pioneer families donated items about 1927, including the Meigs, Fearing, Devol, Blennerhassett, Mason, Hildreth, and Sprague. The building, which now has a basement, was enclosed in the south wing of the museum later.

A 1903 history says the building was commonly called The Old Block-House.

An earlier home of General Putnam's, the General Rufus Putnam House in Rutland, Massachusetts, is also listed on the National Register.
