= Murgul District =

District of Artvin Province, Turkey

- District
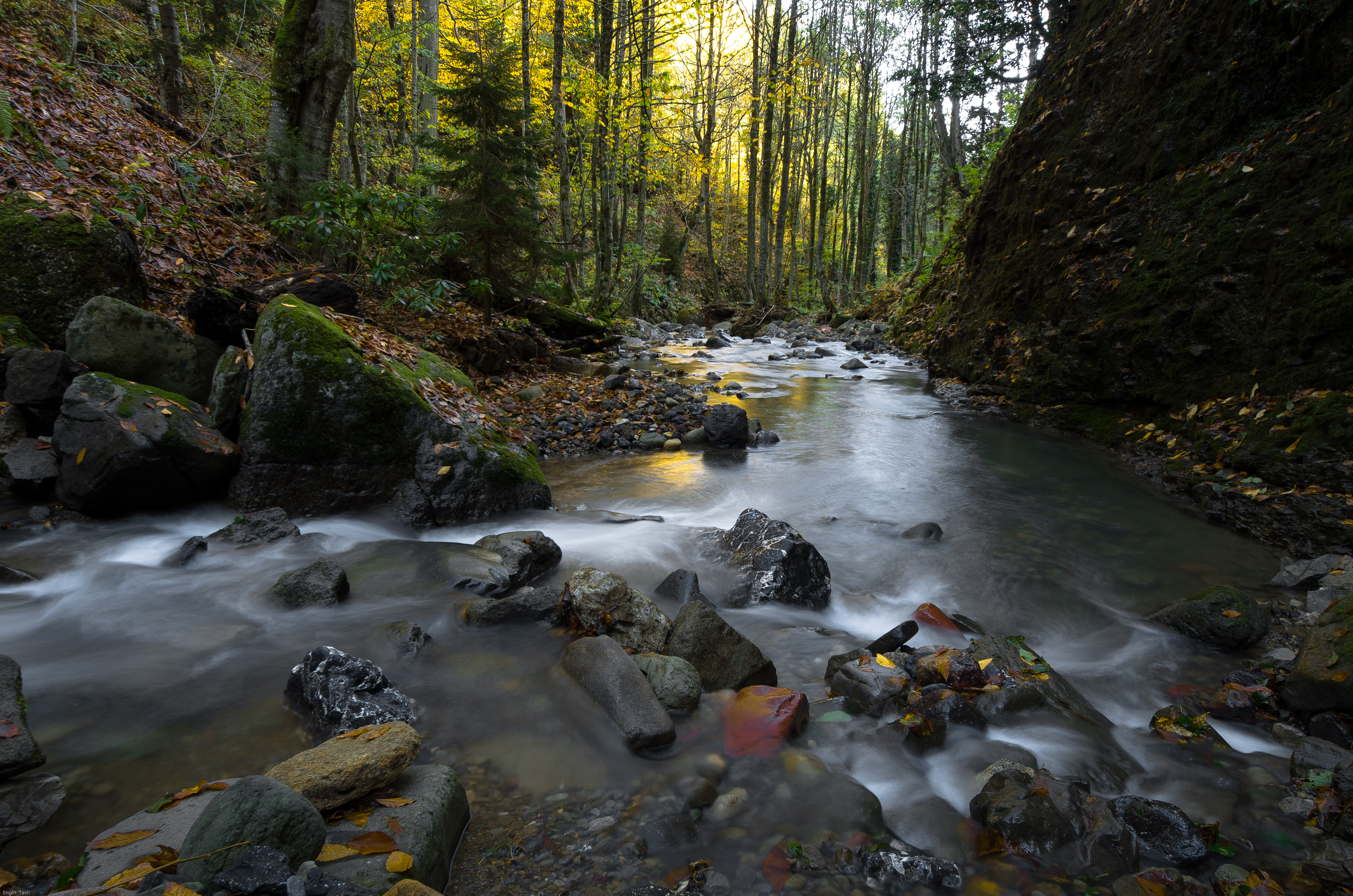
- Murgul landscape

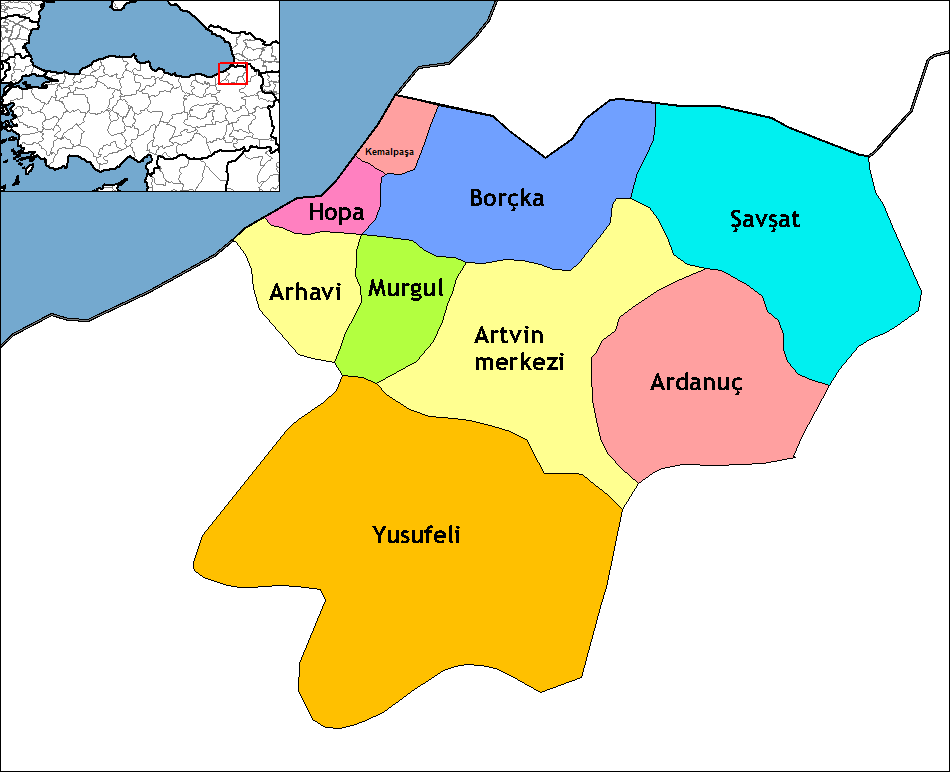
- Map showing Murgul District in Artvin Province

- Location within Turkey
- Coordinates: 41°17′N 41°34′E
- Country: Turkey
- Province: Artvin
- Seat: Murgul

Government
  - Kaymakam: Yunus Tekçe
- Area: 301 km^{2} (116 sq mi)
- Population (2021): 6,522
  - Density: 21.7/km^{2} (56.1/sq mi)
- Time zone: UTC+3 (TRT)
- Website: www.murgul.gov.tr

Murgul District is a district of Artvin Province of Turkey. Its seat is the town Murgul. Its area is 301 km^{2}, and its population is 6,522 (2021).

== Composition ==
There is one municipality in Murgul District:

- Murgul

There are 11 villages in Murgul District:

- Akantaş
- Ardıçlı
- Başköy
- Çimenli
- Damar
- Erenköy
- Kabaca
- Korucular
- Küre
- Osmanlı
- Petek
