= General Rufus Putnam House =

Historic house in Massachusetts, United States

- U.S. National Register of Historic Places
- U.S. National Historic Landmark
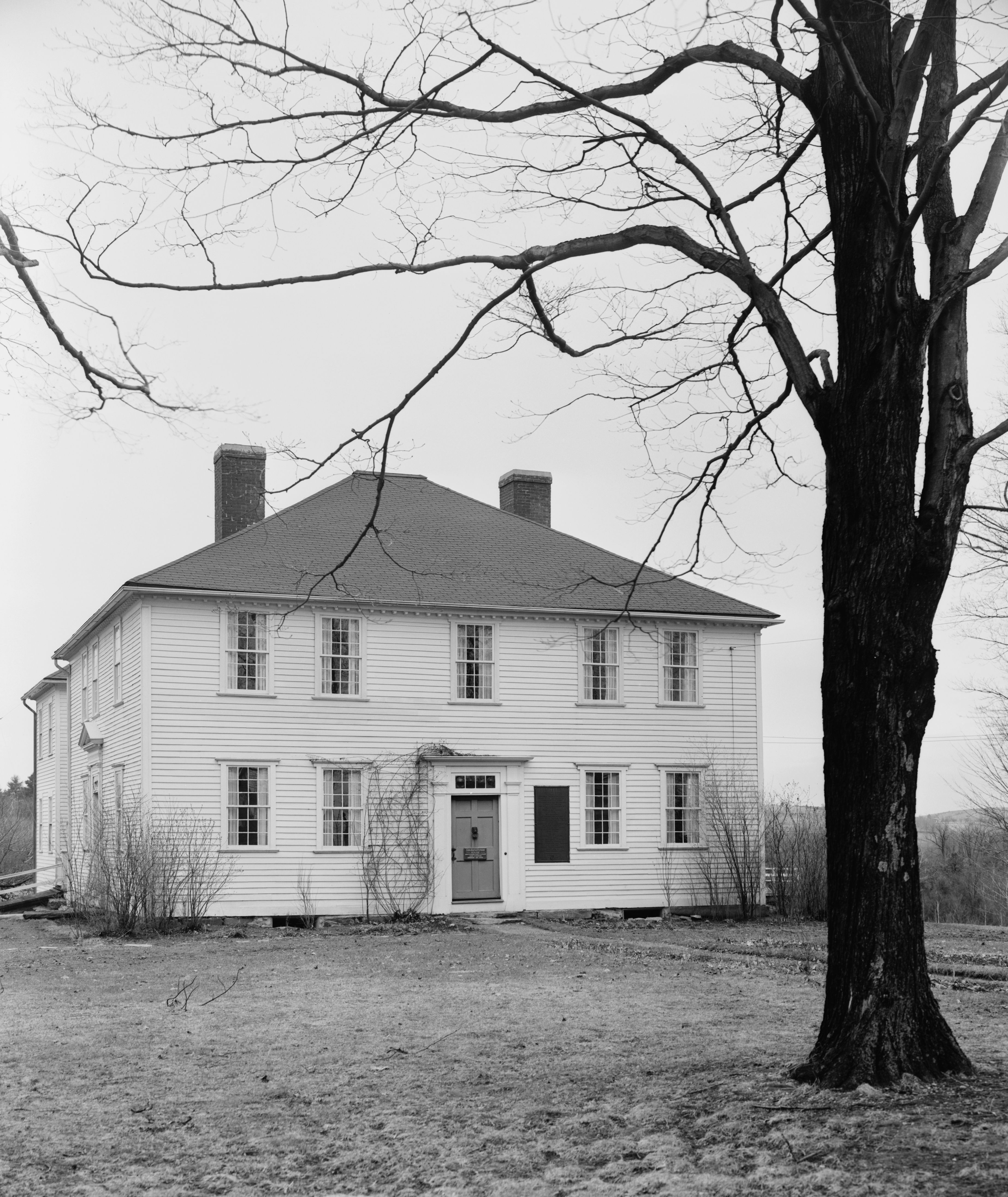
- General Rufus Putnam House, c. 1934

- Location within Massachusetts Location within the United States
- Location: Rutland, Massachusetts, U.S.
- Coordinates: 42°22′17″N 71°58′03″W
- Area: 135 acres (55 ha)
- Built: 1750
- Architectural style: 2-story rectangular frame, hipped roof
- NRHP reference No.: 72001330

Significant dates
- Added to NRHP: 28 November 1972
- Designated NHL: 28 November 1972

The General Rufus Putnam House (also Bliss–Murray–Putnam House) is a National Historic Landmark at 344 Main Street in Rutland, Worcester County, Massachusetts, U.S.

== History ==
The two-story wood-frame house was built between 1760 and 1765 by John Murray, a Scots-Irish immigrant. Murray became a Mandamus Councillor, who enforced the tax laws and was only responsible to the governor and king. On August 24, 1774, an angry mob forced him to flee his home. He escaped to Boston and later to New Brunswick, never to return. Murray's daughter had married Daniel Bliss. They were also Loyalists and lived in the house. During the American Revolutionary War, the Commonwealth of Massachusetts confiscated the property.

On May 24, 1781, General Rufus Putnam purchased the property from the government for 993 pounds and lived there until 1788. He left to settle the Northwest Territories as a leader of the Ohio Company of Associates. There he helped found Marietta, Ohio and built a new home, also NRHP listed.

The house was listed on the National Register of Historic Places and designated a National Historic Landmark in 1972, in recognition of its association with Putnam. The home is currently operated as a bed and breakfast.

== Description ==
The house is a wood-frame two-story house sheathed in clapboard, with a hipped roof and two interior brick chimneys. A two-story addition was added to the rear of the house early in the 20th century. The house front is five bays wide, with a center doorway that is flanked by pilasters and topped by a transom window and flat pediment. The interior of the main block consists of four rooms on each floor, surrounding a central hallway with stairwell. The second-floor bedrooms have retained much of their original woodwork, including pine wainscoting and paneling. Some of the first-floor rooms have had floors replaced using floorboards taken from the attic.

== See also ==
- List of National Historic Landmarks in Massachusetts
- National Register of Historic Places listings in Worcester County, Massachusetts
- Rufus Putnam House – Rufus Putnam's home in Marietta, Ohio
- General Israel Putnam House – Danvers, Massachusetts birthplace of Major General Israel Putnam (Rufus Putnam's first cousin, once removed)
- Deacon Edward Putnam Jr. House – Middleton, Massachusetts home of Deacon Edward Putnam Jr. (Rufus Putnam's uncle)
- Edward Putnam House – Sutton, Massachusetts home of Edward Putnam (Rufus Putnam's first cousin)
