= Marietta Historic District (Marietta, Ohio) =

Historic district in Ohio, United States

- Marietta Historic District and Increase
- U.S. National Register of Historic Places
- U.S. Historic district
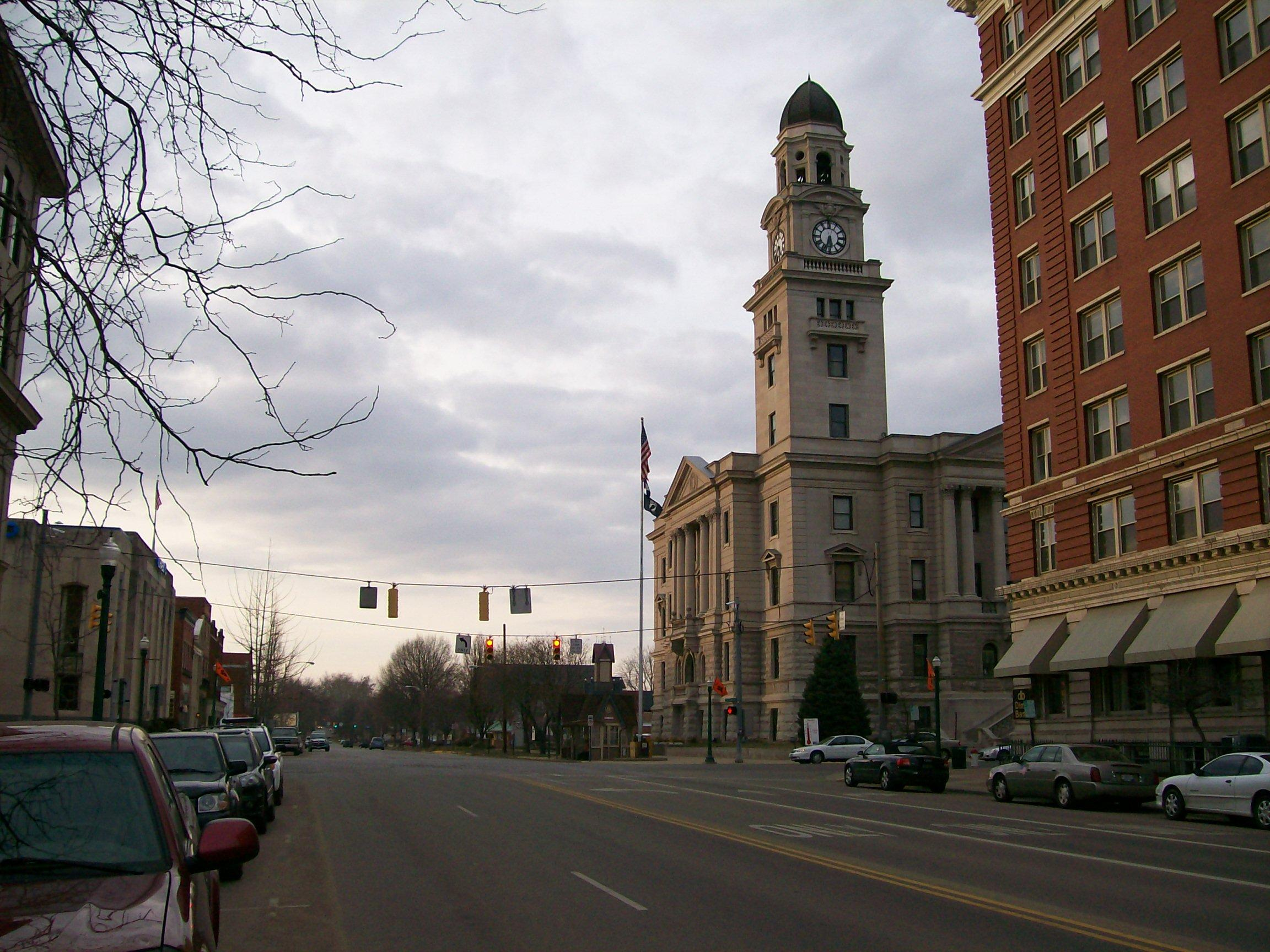
- Second Street looking northwest, with the Washington County Courthouse at right

- Location within Ohio Location within the United States
- Location: Roughly bounded by the Muskingum and Ohio Rivers and Warren, 3rd, 5th, and 6th Sts., Marietta, Ohio; also roughly bounded by Marion, Montgomery, Ohio, Greene, Butler, and 2nd through 9th Sts., and the Ohio and Muskingum Rivers
- Coordinates: 39°25′4″N 81°27′19″W
- Area: 450 acres (180 ha); 480 acres (190 ha)
- Built: 1788
- Architect: Multiple
- Architectural style: Greek Revival, Late Victorian, Federal
- NRHP reference No.: 74001646; 01000903
- Added to NRHP: December 19, 1974; August 21, 2001

The Marietta Historic District is a historic district in Marietta, Ohio, United States that is listed on the National Register of Historic Places. Among the buildings in the district are ones dating back to 1788, the year in which Marietta was founded as the first white settlement in what is now Ohio. Among its most significant buildings are the Rufus Putnam House and the Ohio Company Land Office, which are also separately listed on the Register.

When the district was added to the Register in 1974, it encompassed an area roughly bounded by the Muskingum and Ohio Rivers and Warren, Third, Fifth, and Sixth Streets. In 2001, some of its original boundaries were slightly reduced, but it was also expanded greatly to include an area roughly bounded by Marion, Montgomery, Ohio, Greene, Butler, and Second through Ninth Streets, and the Ohio and Muskingum Rivers. The resulting district encompasses over 900 acres (360 ha) and includes over two thousand contributing properties.

The National Register includes properties and districts that are considered historic under any of four criteria:

- Association with significant events in American history
- Association with significant historical individuals
- Well-preserved and historically significant architecture
- Possibility of yielding archaeological evidence

While most properties and districts on the Register qualify under one or two of the criteria, the Marietta Historic District qualifies under all four.

== See also ==
- Basilica of St. Mary of the Assumption (Marietta, Ohio)
