= Catharinus P. Buckingham =

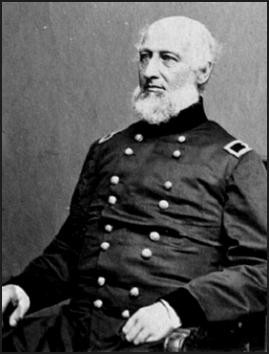
- Born: March 14, 1808; Zanesville, Ohio
- Died: August 30, 1888 (aged 80); Chicago, Illinois
- Burial place: Woodlawn Cemetery, Zanesville, Ohio
- Relatives: Grandson of Rufus Putnam
- Military career
- Allegiance: United States of America; Union
- Branch: United States Army; Union Army
- Service years: 1829–1831; 1861–1863
- Rank: Brigadier General
- Units: 3rd U.S. Artillery Regiment; U.S. War Department
- Conflicts: American Civil War

Catharinus Putnam Buckingham (March 14, 1808 – August 30, 1888) was an American soldier, college professor, author, and industrialist. He served as a general in the Union Army during the American Civil War, and was the main assistant to the U.S. Secretary of War, Edwin M. Stanton, during part of the first term of the Lincoln Administration.

== Early life and career ==
Buckingham was born and raised in the Putnam section of Zanesville, Ohio, the only child of Ebenezer and Catharine Putnam Buckingham. He was a grandson of Rufus Putnam of American Revolutionary War fame and his wife Persis Rice Putnam. He graduated from the United States Military Academy sixth in the Class of 1829. He subsequently served as a second lieutenant in the 3rd U.S. Artillery on topographical duty. Buckingham married Mary Gird on July 5, 1830, in Utica, New York. He was Assistant Professor of Natural and Experimental Philosophy at West Point from October 1830 to August 28, 1831. He resigned from the Army in 1831.

From 1833 to 1836, he was a professor of mathematics and natural philosophy at Kenyon College. During that time, he remarried, this time to Mary P. Turner on August 24, 1835. He was later the proprietor of the Kokosing Iron Works in Knox County, Ohio.

Buckingham married a third time, on August 26, 1845, to Marion A. Hawkes.

== Civil War and postwar career ==
At the outbreak of the Civil War, he was appointed assistant adjutant general of the Ohio Commissary in May 1861 and was promoted to adjutant general in July. A year later, in July 1862, he was promoted to the rank of brigadier general of U.S. Volunteers, and was assigned to special duty as assistant to the Secretary of War at the War Department in Washington, D.C., and served until he resigned on February 11, 1863.

Buckingham is best known for having carried the orders relieving MG George B. McClellan from command of the Army of the Potomac on November 7, 1862.

After his war service he authored a textbook, New Arithmetic on the Unit System, (Philadelphia, 1869). He is also credited as having written Principles of Arithmetic in 1871. He became president of the Chicago Steel Works in 1873 and was a professor of experimental philosophy at West Point until he retired in 1881. He served as a member of the Board of Visitors for the academy in 1879.

Buckingham died in Chicago, Illinois, at the age of 80, and was buried in Woodlawn Cemetery in Zanesville. He is one of six former Civil War generals buried in that city.

== See also ==
- List of American Civil War generals (Union)
