= Başköy, Murgul =

Başköy
- Village
- Location within Turkey
- Coordinates: 41.2965°N 41.5282°E
- Country: Turkey
- Province: Artvin
- District: Murgul
- Population (2021): 166
- Time zone: UTC+3 (TRT)

Başköy is a village in the Murgul District, Artvin Province, Turkey. Its population is 166 (2021).
