= Champ de Mars: A Story of War =

Play by Pierre-Michel Tremblay

Champ de Mars: A Story of War is the English-language translation of Pierre-Michel Tremblay's Au Champ de Mars, a play set in Montreal that deals with war's effect on soldiers and civilians alike. The play was first produced by Théâtre de la Manufacture in 2009. An English language translation was made by Paula Wing

== Characters ==
- A figment of Eric's imagination, he taunts and torments Eric about a mysterious incident which has left the young soldier damaged.
- A pacifist who has strong ideals which are not matched by strong actions. He is also an electronic musician who teaches klezmer clarinet lessons.
- A young soldier who has been traumatized by his time in Afghanistan. He is estranged from his family and friends, and feels intense guilt about something that happened while he was in active duty.
- A psychologist who works with young war veterans struggling with post-traumatic stress disorder. She, herself, suffers from compassion fatigue, and seeks solace in Klezmer clarinet lessons.
- An action film maker who hopes to direct a masterpiece, an Apocalypse Now for this generation. He hopes to use Scott as inspiration.

The title of the play refers to the ancient Roman Campus Martius, or Field of Mars, which was traditionally a training ground for battle. It also refers to the park in Montreal called Champ de Mars Park.
