= Campo Marte =

Equestrian venue in Mexico City, Mexico

Coordinates: 19°25′29″N 99°11′50″W

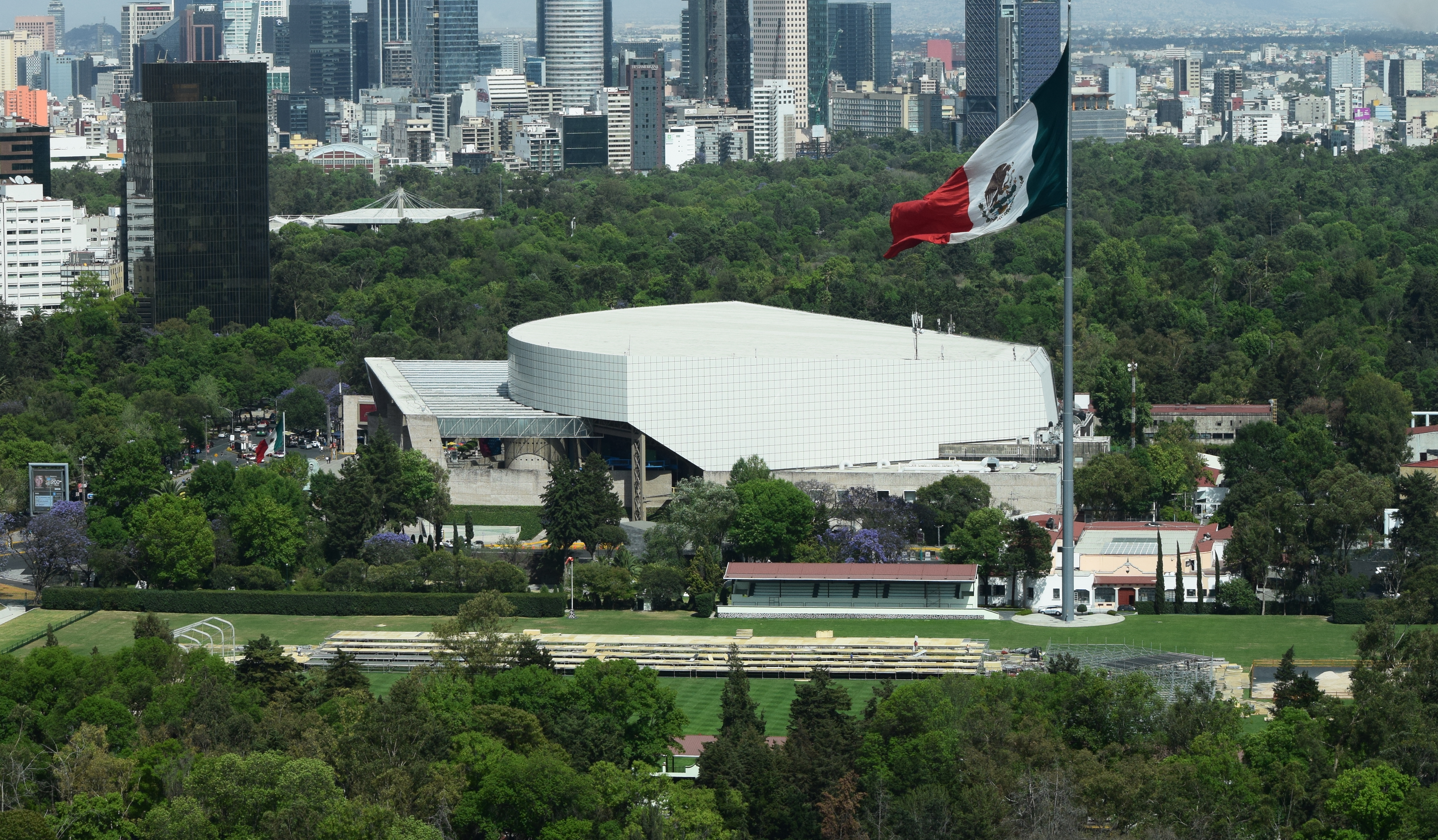
Campo Marte

Campo Marte is a venue under the administration of the Secretariat of National Defense (SEDENA). Named after the Campus Martius (Field of Mars), it is used for military and government events, as well as equestrian events. Campo Marte is located next to the National Auditorium in Chapultepec Park, Mexico City.

== History ==
The land was acquired by the Federal Government on 31 December 1904. On 16 February 1910, the land was designated for a military equestrian club through presidential decree. In 1930, under General Joaquín Amaro Domínguez, there was a promulgation for the construction of a “Casino Militar”. On 1 April 1937, the camp formally came under the control of the SEDENA. President Manuel Ávila Camacho declared on 26 August 1941 that the camp should be known as “Parque Nacional Anáhuac". The former name, "Campo Deportivo Militar Marte", was restored in 1972.

== Military and government ==
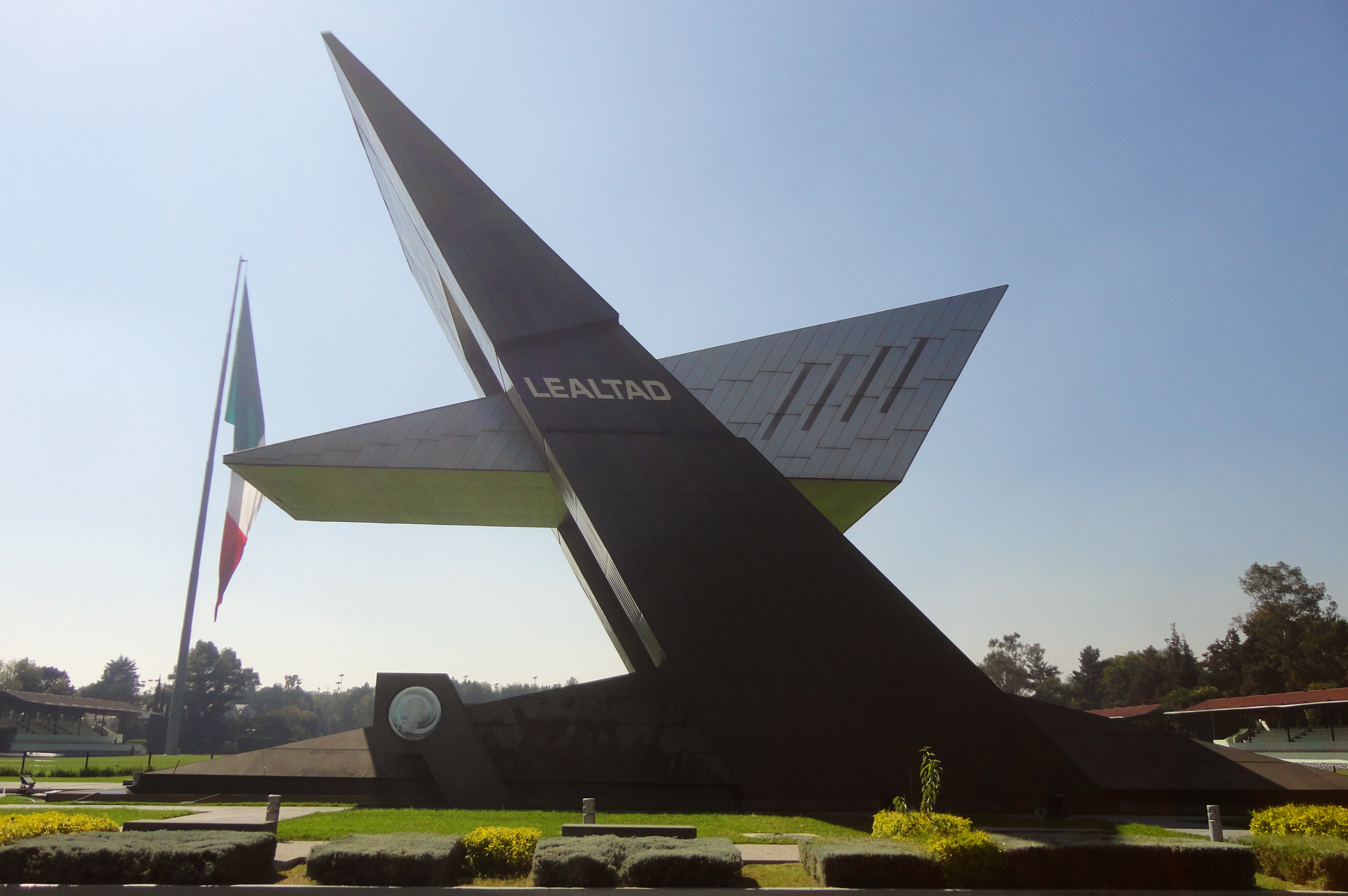
The Monumento Magno to the centennial of the Mexican Army

The Campo Marte is the base for the presidential guards of the Estado Mayor Presidencial.

On the grounds there is a monument commemorating the centennial of the Mexican Army. Although the Army has 19th century antecedents, the official founding date of the modern Army is 19 February 1913; the day that Decreto 1421 was issued in Coahuila. This denounced the presidency of Victoriano Huerta and gave the Governor of Coahuila, Venustiano Carranza, the ability to establish a military force to restore constitutional order.

Campo Marte is the location of a Monumental Mexican Flag measuring 50 meters long by 28 meters wide located on a flagpole that is 100 meters high.

== Sports events ==
It hosted the dressage and individual jumping events of the equestrian competitions for the 1968 Summer Olympics. It was where the 2008 World Polo Championship took place.
