= Erenköy, Murgul =

Erenköy
- Village
- Location within Turkey
- Coordinates: 41.3058°N 41.6108°E
- Country: Turkey
- Province: Artvin
- District: Murgul
- Population (2021): 84
- Time zone: UTC+3 (TRT)

Erenköy is a village in the Murgul District, Artvin Province, Turkey. Its population is 84 (2021).
