= Hélène-Louise Demars =

French composer and music teacher

Hélène-Louise Demars (1736–1778) was a French composer and music teacher.

Demars wrote several cantatas dedicated to nobles such as Mademoiselle de Soubise of the Rohan family and Madame La Marquise de Villeroy. She went on to become a teacher of several instruments such as the harpsichord and the violin.

== Early life ==
Demars was born in 1736 in France, probably in Paris. Her father, Jean-Odéo Demars was a musician at two churches in Paris. After her father died in 1756, she lived with her mother and siblings in the Rue St. Thomas du Louvre.

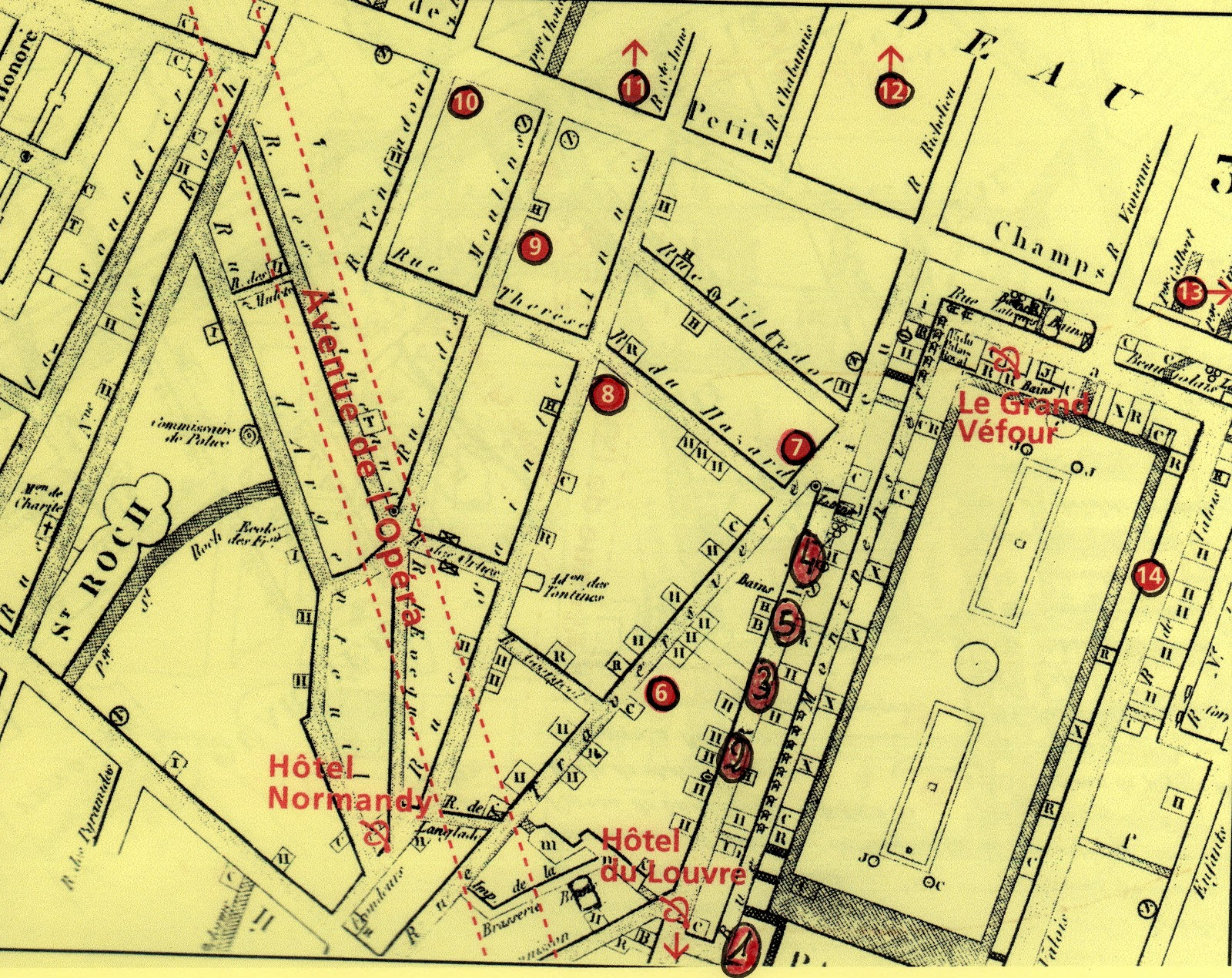
Rue St. Thomas du Louvre, where Demars lived with her mother and siblings after her father died

== Personal life ==
In 1759, Demars married Jean-Baptiste Vernier, a violinist and music dealer specializing in foreign editions. It is unknown if she and her husband had any children.

== Career and works ==
Demars' most cited-work, "L'Horoscope" is dedicated to Mademoiselle de Soubise of the Rohan family. It was performed for de Soubise as early as 21 November 1748, when Demars was about 12 years old. It was published in the Mercure de France in 1749.

Demars dedicated her work "Hercule et Omphale" to Madame La Marquise de Villeroy. She composed several other works.

Demars became a member of a literary circle run by Alexandre Le Riche de La Poupelinière, an influential patron of the Enlightenment Era. De La Poupelinière circle's may have provided Demars with introductions to artists and potential patrons.

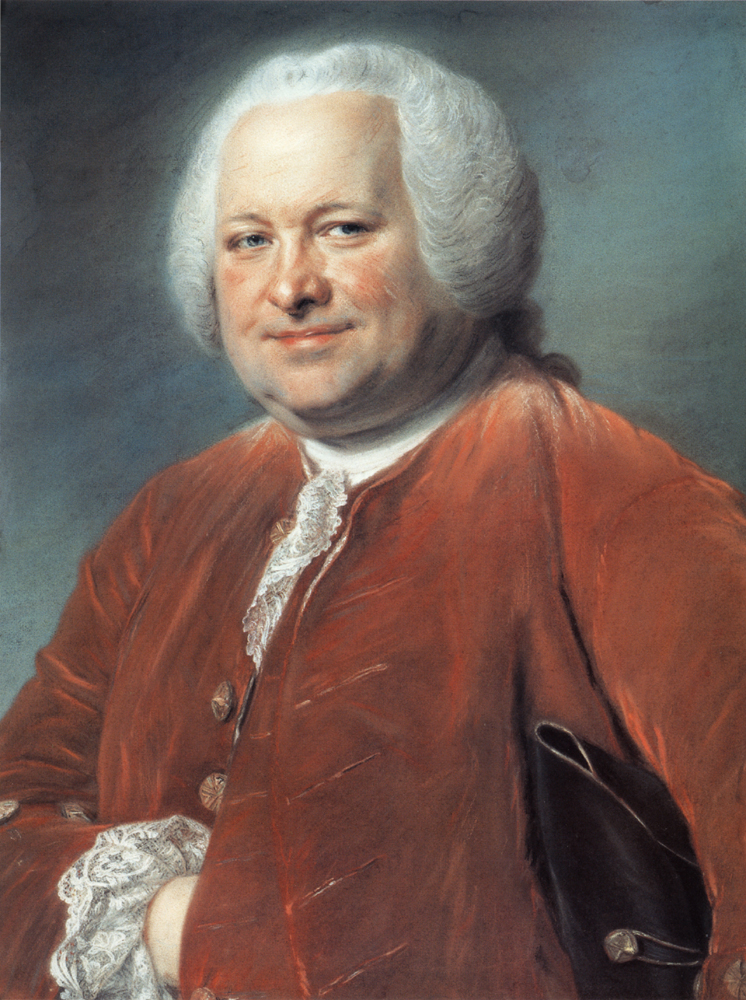
La Tour - La Pouplinière WB 205

Demars also taught the violin and the harpsichord. She was advertised in the "Tableau de Paris pour l'annee 1759," as a "maîtresse" or "teacher" of the harpsichord.

== Bibliography ==
- Brain, Corisha. A social, literary and musical study of Julie Pinel's Nouveau recueil d'airs serieux et à boire. A social, literary and musical study of Julie Pinel's Nouveau recueil d'airs serieux et à boire 1. N.p.: New Zealand School of Music, 2008.
- Curtis, Alan S. Jean-Philippe Rameau. http://www.britannica.com/biography/Jean-Philippe-Rameau. Accessed May 4, 2016.
- Demars, Hélène-Louise. Hercule et Omphale, 1re cantatille à voix seule et simphonie.
- Demars, Hélène-Louise. L'horoscope Cantate, du Meme" [The Horoscope Song, of the same]. Mercure de France, March 1749, 40-41.
- David Fuller and Bruce Gustafson. Demars, Jean Odéo. Grove Music Online. Oxford Music Online. Oxford University Press, accessed April 1, 2016, http://www.oxfordmusiconline.com/subscriber/article/grove/music/07526 .
- Hoffmann, Freia. Mars, Hélène-Louise de, verh. Vernier, Venier, Vernieri. http://www.sophie-drinker-institut.de/cms/index.php/mars-helene-louise. Last modified 2007. Accessed May 4, 2016.
- Jackson, Barbara Garvey. Say Can You Deny Me: A Guide to Surviving Music by Women from the 16th through the 18th Centuries. N.p.: University of Arkansas Press, 1994.
- M. Brenet: 'La librairie musical en France de 1653 à 1790 d'après les registres de privilèges'. SIMG, viii (1906-7), 447
- van Boer, Bertil. Historical Dictionary of Music of the Classical Period (Historical Dictionaries of Literature and the Arts). N.p.: Scarecrow Press, 2-12.
- Demars, Hélène-Louise. In The Norton/Grove Dictionary of Women Composers, edited by Julie Anne Sadie and Rhian Samuel, 139-40. N.p.: W. W. Norton & Company, 1995.
