= Dhamar, Rohtak =

Dhamar
- Village (Rohtak)
- Location in Haryana, India Dhamar (India)
- Coordinates: 28.96°N 76.67°E
- Country: India
- State: Haryana

Languages
  - Official: Hindi
- Time zone: UTC+5:30 (IST)
- PIN: 124401
- Vehicle registration: HR
- Website: haryana.gov.in

Dhamar is a village in Rohtak district of Haryana, India. According to 2011 Census of India population of the village is 4,551.
