= Lina van de Mars =

German TV monitor, motor athlete, and drummer

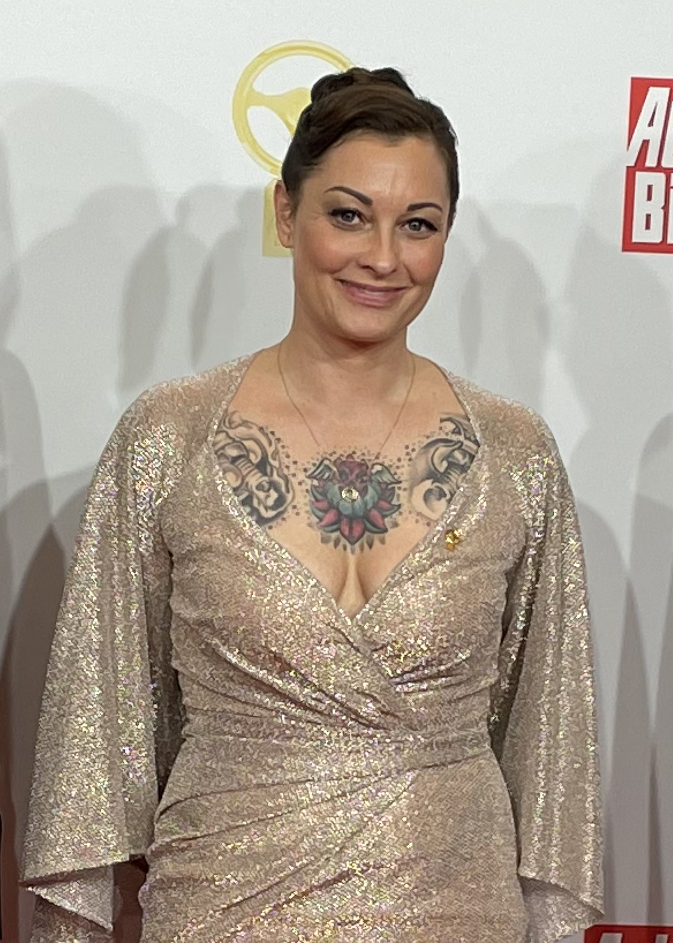
Lina van de Mars, Goldenes Lenkrad 2021

Lina van de Mars (born 13 September 1979 in Munich, Germany) is a German TV presenter, motor athlete and drummer.

== Life and career ==
After passing her Abitur in Munich in 2000, Lina van de Mars moved to Berlin to support the band Lemonbabies as a drummer. At the same time, she began a master's degree in Dutch and Indian philology and art history at the Free University of Berlin. Because of her media activities, she gave up her studies in 2002.

Between 2002 and 2003, van de Mars worked first as an intern and then as a freelancer for Sony BMG/Epic as a promoter and tour guide. During this time she worked with artists such as MIA. (as part of the Unirocker tour), Lorien, Goldjunge and Destiny's Child.

At the same time, in August 2002, she began training as a car mechanic, which she expanded in 2014 with additional training as a car mechatronics technician.[1][2] Later, van de Mars worked as a mechanic for Alfa Team Engstler as part of the Beru TOP 10.

In November 2003, van de Mars was discovered by broadcaster DSF (now Sport1) as a TV presenter in her then-car workshop and signed on. She first appeared on air in February 2004 in the program Tuning TV, which was initially presented by a total of three so-called Tuning Angels. From 2006, van de Mars was the only presenter responsible for the format. In the same year, the Berliner-by-choice was signed by the station DMAX for the show Der Checker, which she hosted until 2011 together with Alexander Wesselsky and from 2011 as the main face with a new cast.

In 2008, she was simultaneously in front of the camera for a year for the format Die Autoprofis on the station Sport1. In 2010, she was additionally contracted by Kabel eins, for which she took over the live broadcast of the ADAC GT Masters together with Jan Stecker until 2013. At the same time, she hosted the ADAC Formula Masters format and the show Abenteuer Tuning on Kabel Eins.

For Pro7, Lina hosted the tattoo format "Lina hilft" from 2011 to 2012, for which she also assumed editorial responsibility. In 2011 and 2012, van de Mars took part in the TV total Stock Car Crash Challenge as a member of the eBay Motors team. From March 2012 to March 2014, she hosted the Internet magazine TecTV.de of the Association of German Engineers (VDI).

In 2013, van de Mars, who acquired her racing license in 2008, drove for Mercedes-Benz in a prototype in the "Rallye Aïcha des Gazelles" rally in Morocco.[3] The following year, she contested a complete rally season for Opel in the ADAC Opel Rally Cup as part of the German Rally Championship.

To this day, Lina is passionate about off-road racing and has been very successful in 24h races in recent years (Netherlands, Albania, Poland, Germany).

2019 she founds her own offroad – racing team, which consists entirely of mechatronics engineers. August 2019, the fast ladies together with Jutta Kleinschmidt contest their first mission at the 24h of GORM in Poland and were 23h and 15min in the lead, until a defect in the gearbox cost them 1st place.

In 2020, Lina planned to compete in the Morocco Desert Challenge with her women's team and Lisette Bakker from the Netherlands. Currently on a Polaris RZR 1000 Turbo XP. The race was postponed until April 2022 due to the pandemic.

In 2021 Lina and Lisette surprised at short notice with a participation in the Baja Russia from 07.02.-09.02.21 in the north of St. Petersburg. They competed with a Toyota Landcruiser 200.

September 2021 Lina participated for the first time together with the Dakar racing team XtremePlus from France in the Baja Italy in T4 and convinced in her debut with a solid 2nd place.

In 2022, Lina, a factory driver for Polaris Germany, was scheduled to compete in the Baja WORLD CUP in a Polaris XP Pro.

Since October 2014, van de Mars has appeared as a car expert on Sat.1 breakfast television.

Lina van de Mars has been and continues to be featured on many covers, and in addition, many print stories.[4][5]

In 2018 and 2019, Lina van de Mars is the face of the apprentice campaign of the Central Association of the German Motor Trade (ZDK). Under #echteautoliebe, she motivates students to get involved with automotive professions.[6]

Since 2021, Lina has been independently producing podcasts, as well as short films and commercials, together with her company Vandemars Entertainment.

== Personal profile ==
Van de Mars is a vegetarian and supports the animal rights organization PETA, among other things with a television commercial. She also campaigns for the breast cancer prevention "Keep a Breast" and is patron of the wheelchair workshop of the Katrin Rohde-Foundation in Ouagadougou/Burkina Faso. Since 2009, Lina has been a jury member at the "Golden Steering Wheel".

== Television (selection) ==
- 1991/1992: "Eurokids" (Tele 5)
- 1996–2002: various short presenting roles for VIVA, MTV, NBC Giga, etc.
- 2004–2006: "Tuning TV" (Sport1)
- 2006–2013: "Der Checker" (DMAX and Discovery Channel)
- 2008–2009: "Die Autoprofis" (Sport1)
- 2010–2013: presentation of the "ADAC GT Masters", "Abenteuer Tuning" and "ADAC Formel Masters" (all Kabel eins)
- 2011/2012: "Lina helps" (ProSieben)
- Since 2014: car expert at Sat1 – breakfast TV

== Radio ==
- Since November 2013: presenter and editorial work of her own programme "Mars, Cars, Stars" on the radio channel "Star FM”

== Music (selection) ==
- Since 1995: performances as a drummer for various bands
- 2000–2002: drummer with the Lemonbabies
- about 2002: TV-drummer with the band Right said Fred
- 2002–2014: drummer with the Berlin punk band Payback 5
- Summer/autumn 2003: temporary drummer of the Cologne band Lili
- June to August 2004: TV-drummer for the starsearch-winner Florence Joy
- End of 2004: foundation of the rock and roll-band Buddy & the Lucky Chicks
- April 2005: introduction as drummer of the band Black Velvet Voodoo, furthermore Payback 5 and Buddy & the Lucky Chicks
- April 2006: studio recordings with Black Velvet Voodoo
- 2006–2008: drummer with the band Hershe
- 2007: special guest during the USA-Tour of the band Rotten Apples
- January 2008: with Payback 5 in New York
- February 2008: drummer in the music video "Girl with a Gun" from Northern Lite
- January 2010: drummer of band LOVIES, official song of the German Rallye-Championship: "Fire & Gasoline" – Matt Roehr feat. LOVIES
- 2011–2014: various guest appearances, among others for the band Bonaparte and the electro-combo Mädlick
