= Campus Martius Museum =

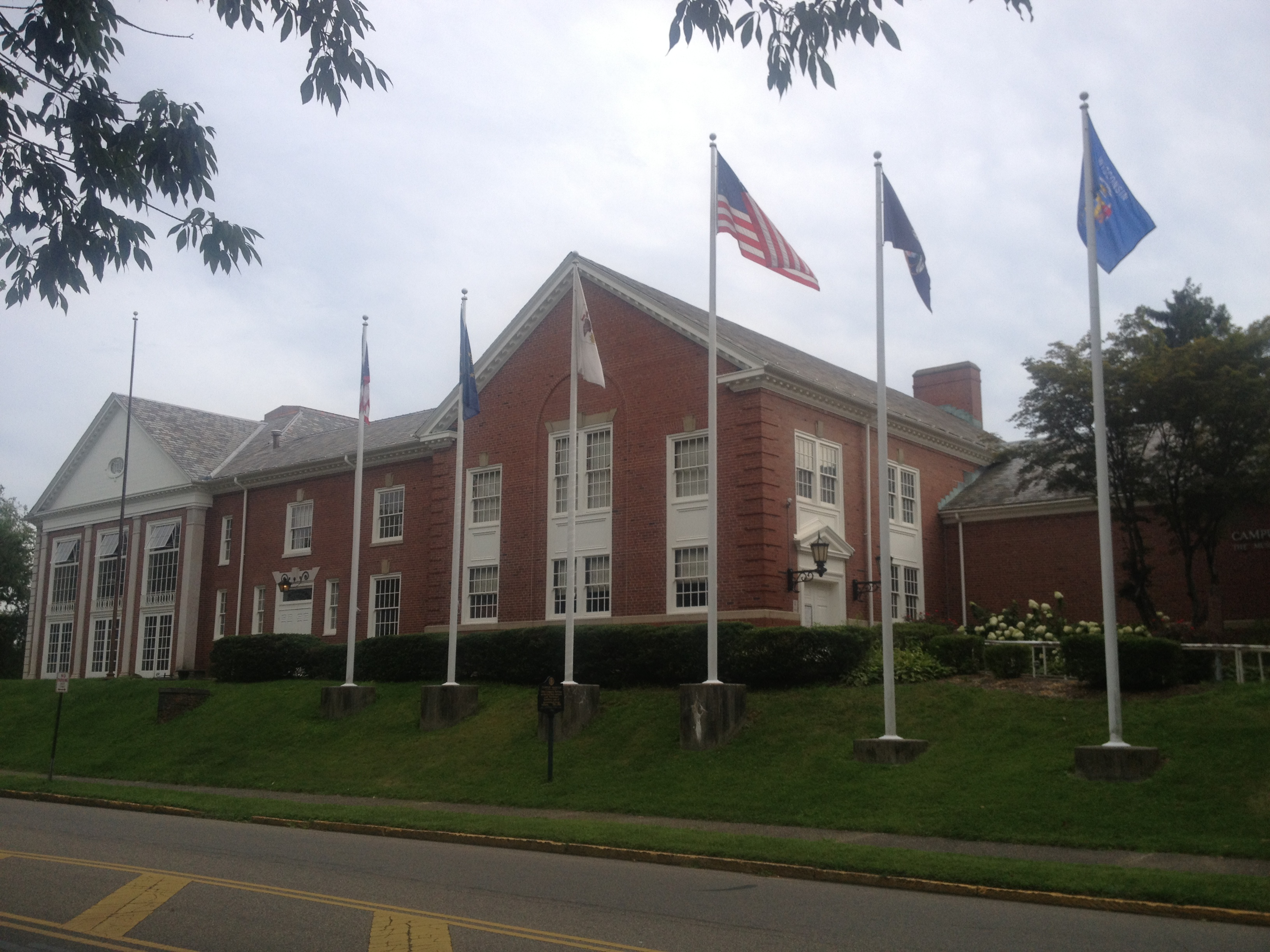
- Campus Martius Museum, Marietta, Ohio.
- Location: 601 Second St, Marietta, Ohio
- Coordinates: 39°25′17″N 81°27′41″W
- Type: history museum
- Key holdings: Rufus Putnam House
- Parking: On site (no charge)
- Website: mariettamuseums.org/campus-martius

Marietta Museums
- Campus Martius Museum; Ohio River Museum

The Campus Martius Museum interprets Ohio history.

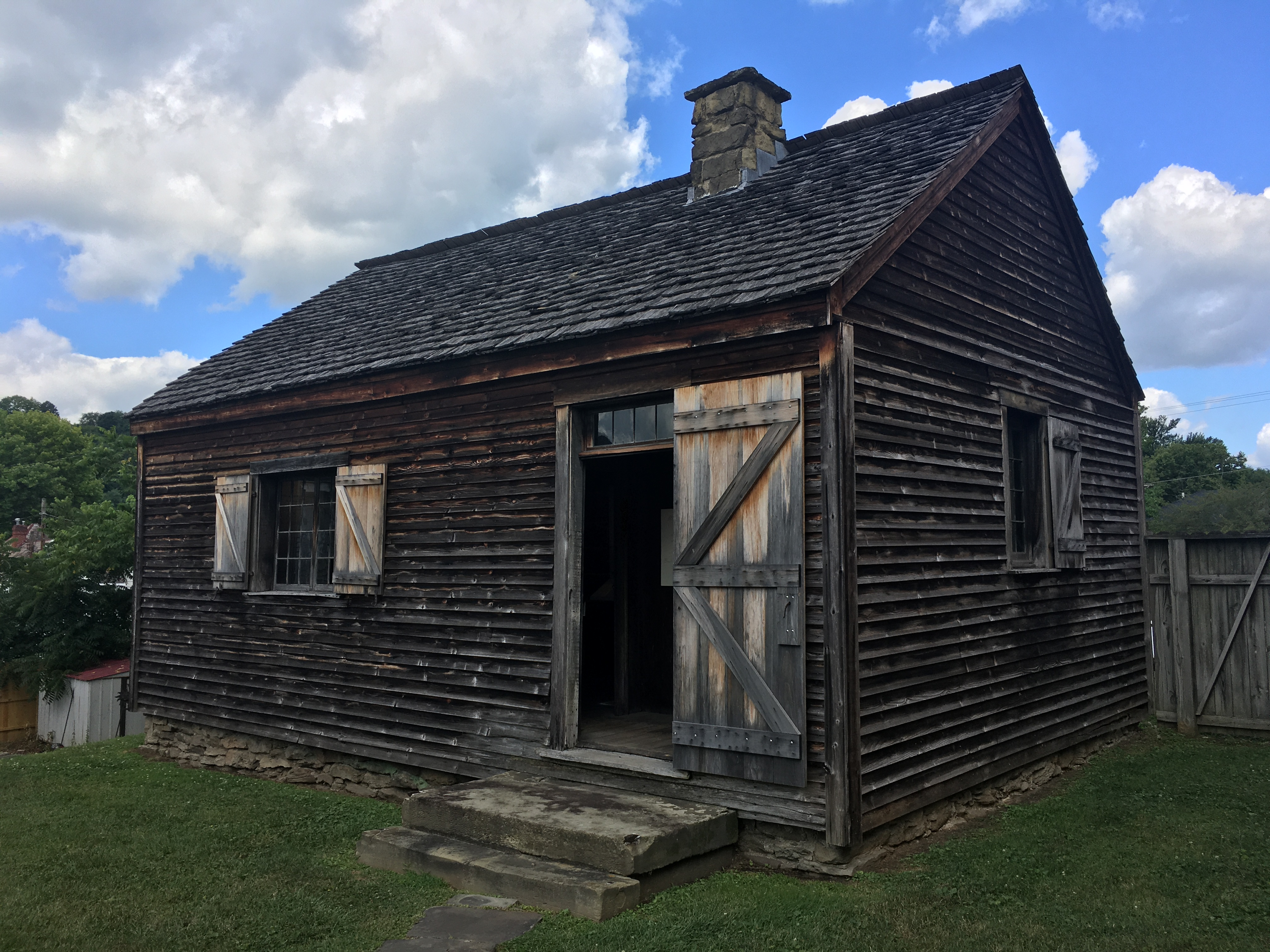
This land office used by Rufus Putnam is the oldest building in Ohio (and all of the Northwest Territory). It is now part of the Campus Martius Museum.

Campus Martius was the second fortification in Marietta, Ohio and the first primarily for civilian defense. The Rufus Putnam House, incorporated in the Museum, is the only remaining part of the fortification. The museum also includes the Ohio Company Land Office. Both are National Register of Historic Places properties. The museum is located a block from the Ohio River Museum and owned by the Ohio History Connection.

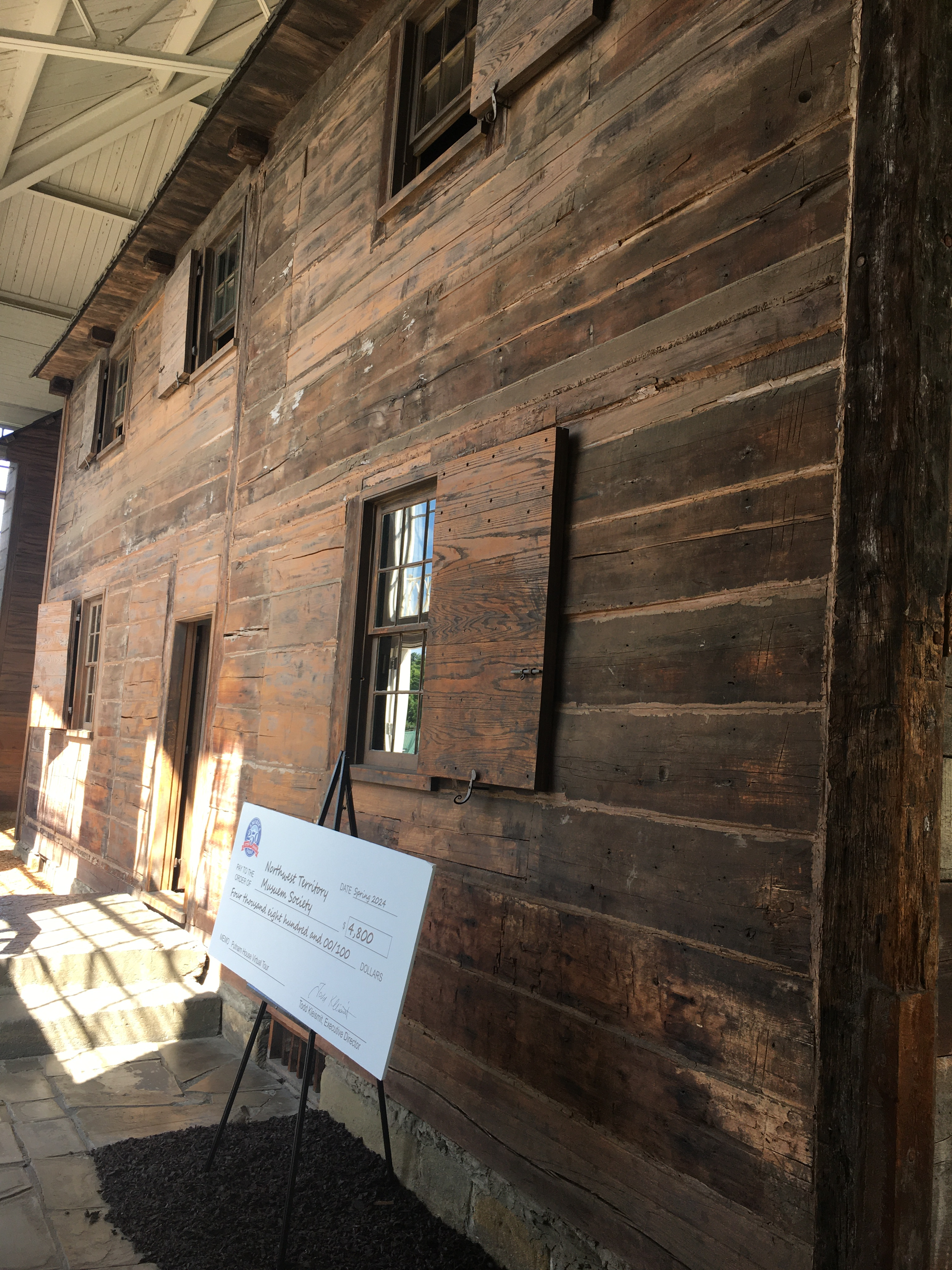
Rufus Putnam's house was part of the original stockade at Campus Martius, and is now part of the museum.

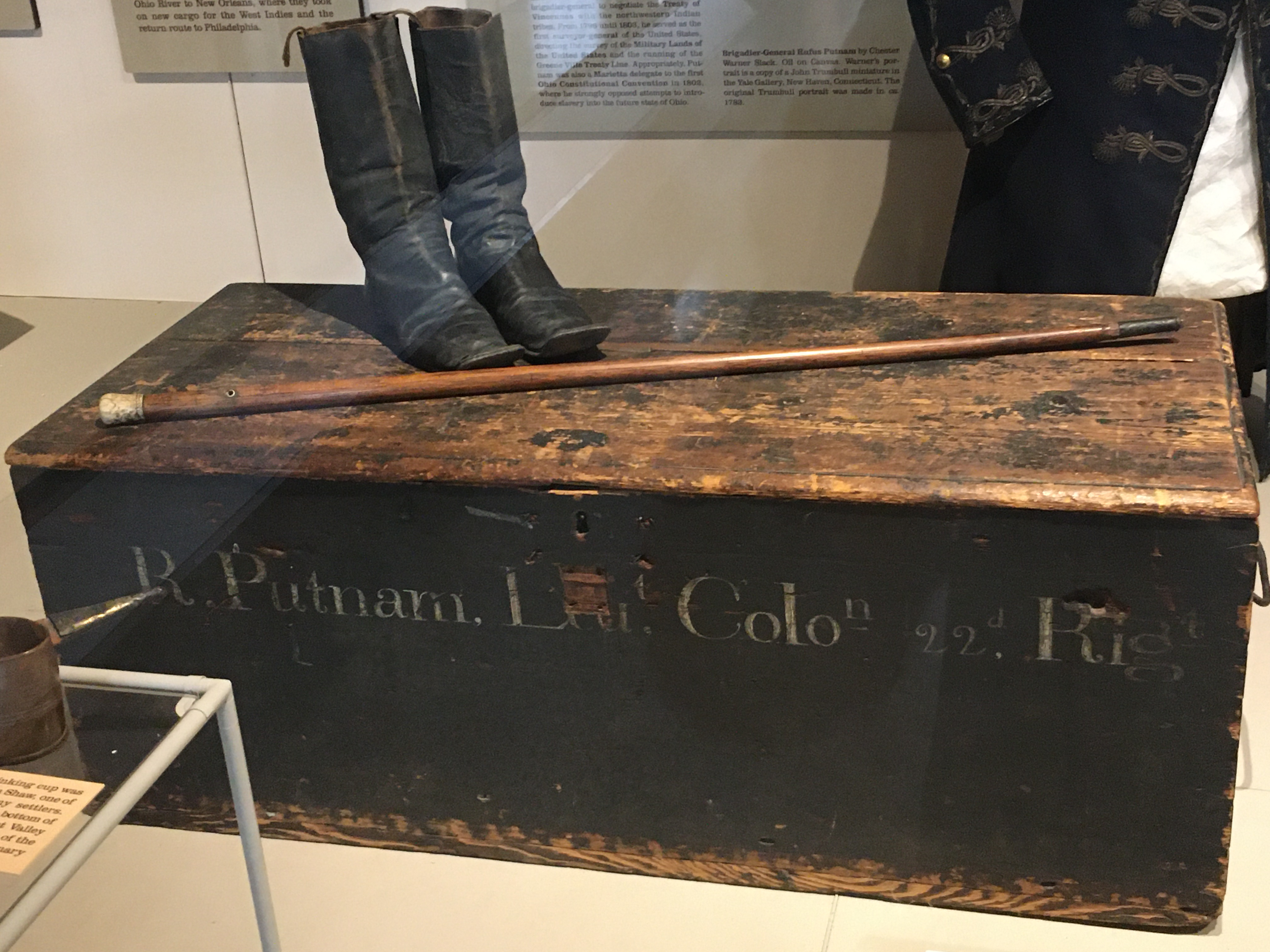
Boots, cane and Revolutionary War military chest of Rufus Putnam (the "Father of Ohio").
