= Osmanlı, Murgul =

Osmanlı
- Village
- Location within Turkey
- Coordinates: 41°18′N 41°36′E
- Country: Turkey
- Province: Artvin
- District: Murgul
- Area: 0.41 km^{2} (0.16 sq mi)
- Elevation: 445 m (1,460 ft)
- Highest elevation: 560 m (1,840 ft)
- Lowest elevation: 420 m (1,380 ft)
- Population (2023): 160
  - Density: 390/km^{2} (1,000/sq mi)
- Time zone: UTC+3 (TRT)

Osmanlı (formerly: Özmal) is a village in the Murgul District, Artvin Province, Turkey. Its population is 160 (2023).
