= Demar Rose =

Jamaican footballer (born 1996)

Personal information
- Date of birth: 6 December 1996 (age 29)
- Place of birth: Kingston, Jamaica
- Height: 1.80 m (5 ft 11 in)
- Position: Midfielder

Team information
- Current team: Harbour View
- Number: 50

Youth career
- –2010: Cavalier
- 2010: Waterhouse
- 2010–2011: Duhaney Park
- 2011–2014: Harbour View

College career
Years	Team	Apps	(Gls)
2015–2019	Valparaiso Crusaders	66	(3)

Senior career*
Years	Team	Apps	(Gls)
2014	Harbour View	4	(0)
2017	Harbour View	4	(0)
2019	Lane United	3	(0)
2021–2022	Portmore United	15	(2)
2022–	Harbour View	8	(0)

International career^{‡}
2022–	Jamaica	1	(0)
- * Club domestic league appearances and goals as of 22 January 2023 ‡ National team caps and goals as of 20 January 2022

Demar Rose (born 6 December 1996) is a Jamaican footballer who plays as a midfielder for Jamaican club Harbour View and the Jamaica national team.

== Career statistics ==
=== Club ===
As of 22 January 2023

Appearances and goals by club, season and competition
Club	Season	League			Cup		Continental		Other		Total	
Club	Season	Division	Apps	Goals	Apps	Goals	Apps	Goals	Apps	Goals	Apps	Goals
Harbour View	2013–14	National Premier League	4	0				0	—		4+	0+
Harbour View	2016–17	National Premier League	4	0	—		—		—		4	0
Harbour View	2017–18	National Premier League	0	0			—		—		0+	0+
Harbour View	Total		4	0	0+	0+	0	0	0	0	4+	0+
Lane United	2019	USL League Two	3	0	—		—		—		3	0
Portmore United	2021	National Premier League	7	1	—		—		—		7	1
Portmore United	2022	National Premier League	8	1	—		—		—		8	1
Portmore United	Total		15	2	0	0	0	0	0	0	15	2
Harbour View	2022–23	National Premier League	8	0	—		—		—		8	0
Career total			34	2	0+	0+	0+	0	0	0	34+	2+

=== International ===
As of 20 January 2022

Appearances and goals by national team and year
National team	Year	Apps	Goals
Jamaica	2022	1	0
Total		1	0
