= Jean-Odéo Demars =

French organist, composer and harpsichordist

Jean-Odéo Demars (1695–1756) was an 18th-century French organist, composer and harpsichordist.

Demars was born in Sézanne, Champagne (province), France, on 2 February 1695.

In 1726, he became organist at the Saint-Jacques-la-Boucherie church in Paris. Later, he was appointed organist at Saint-Nicolas-du-Chardonnet church.

He married Geneviève Françoise Legris on February 18, 1734, and they raised seven children. He was the father of musician Hélène-Louise Demars.

As a composer he wrote several spiritual songs for the female students of the Saint-Cyr school, near Paris. Fétis wrote that he published an organ book, now lost.

He died in Paris on 7 November 1756.

We know little else than he was the elder brother of Charles Demars (28 May 1702 – 4 March 1774), nicknamed "Le Cadet", who became in 1728 organist in the Vannes Cathedral, in Brittany, until his death.

In 1735, Charles Demars published his 1er Livre de Clavecin. This book contains 4 suites in the Handel manner.

This collection consists of four suites:

- Suite I in A major
- Suite II in G minor
- Suite III in D minor
- Suite IV in C minor

== See also ==
- List of French harpsichordists
- List of composers from Brittany
