= Rufus Putnam =

American general and pioneer (1738–1824)

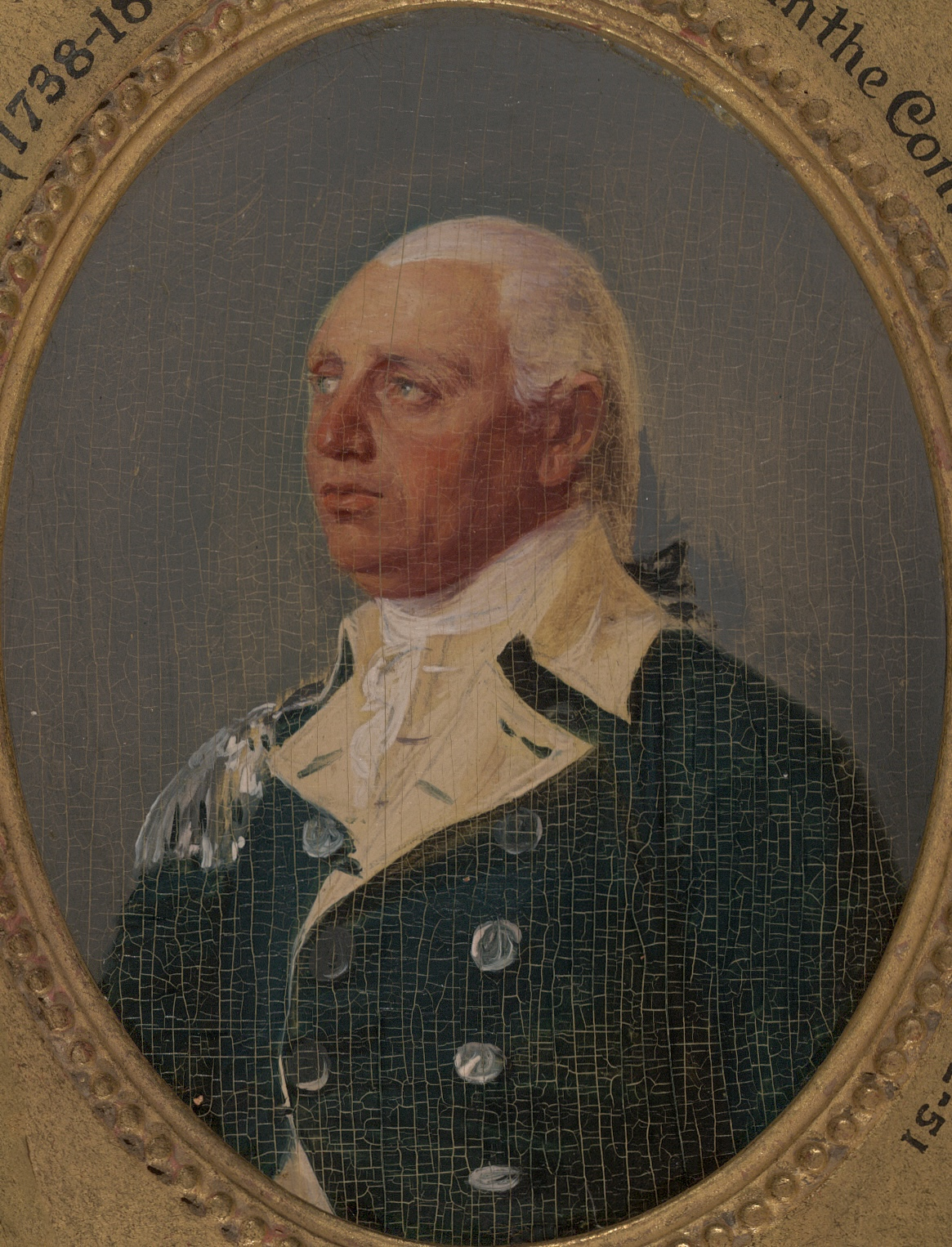
- Portrait miniature by John Trumbull, c. 1790
- Born: April 9, 1738; Sutton, Massachusetts
- Died: May 4, 1824 (aged 86); Marietta, Ohio
- Burial place: Mound Cemetery, Marietta
- Spouse(s): Elizabeth Ayers, Persis Rice
- Military career
- Allegiance: British America; United States
- Branch: Massachusetts Colonial Militia; Continental Army; United States Army
- Service years: 1757–1760; 1775–1783, 1792–1793
- Rank: Brigadier-General
- Conflicts: French and Indian War; American Revolutionary War; Northwest Indian War

Rufus Putnam (April 9, 1738 – May 4, 1824) was an American military officer who fought during the French and Indian War and the American Revolutionary War. As an organizer of the Ohio Company of Associates, he was instrumental in the initial colonization by the United States of former Native American, English, and French lands in the Northwest Territory in present-day Ohio following the war.

Ultimately attaining the rank of brigadier general during the Ohio campaign of 1792–1793, he became known as "Father of the Northwest Territory".

== Early life and career ==
Putnam was born in Sutton, Massachusetts to Elisha Putnam and Susanna Fuller Putnam. Rufus's father Elisha Putnam died when Rufus was 6 or 7, and Rufus temporarily lived with his paternal grandfather in Rhode Island. Elisha Putnam and Israel Putnam, who became a renowned general during the Revolutionary War, were cousins. Ann Putnam, accuser of the Salem witch trials, was a first cousin once removed. After Rufus Putnam's mother married John Sadler, Rufus lived with his mother and stepfather in Sutton, where the family ran an inn.

As a boy one of his eyes was disfigured in an accident, giving it an "outward, oblique cast." Portraits of him are most commonly in profile, perhaps to hide the bad eye.

Putnam served in various Provincial Massachusetts regiments from 1757 to 1760, during the French and Indian War. During the war, Putnam saw action in the Great Lakes region, and near Lake Champlain.

== Migration and work ==
After the war, Putnam relocated to New Braintree, Massachusetts. There, he worked as a millwright from 1761 to 1768.

== Farmer and surveyor ==
While Putnam worked as a millwright, he devoted his free time to self-education, studying geography, mathematics, and surveying.

In 1769, Putnam became a farmer and surveyor. Rufus Putnam, along with his cousin Israel Putnam and two others, traveled in 1773 to survey near present-day Pensacola, Florida. There, Putnam surveyed and chartered lands along the Mississippi River, which the Crown was going to grant to veterans of the French and Indian War in lieu of payment for their service.

== Revolutionary War ==
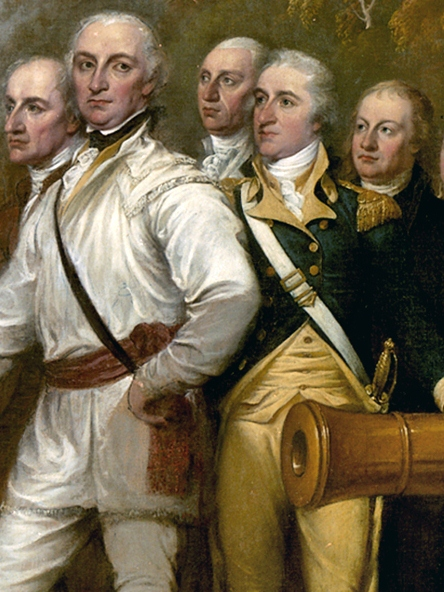
Gen. Rufus Putnam at center-rear

After the Battle of Lexington and Concord, Putnam enlisted the same day, on April 19, 1775, in one of Massachusetts' first revolutionary regiments. Putnam later was commissioned in the Continental Army as a lieutenant colonel, under the command of David Brewer. Brewer's regiment first engaged with the British Army in Roxbury, Massachusetts. After the Battle of Lexington and Concord and the Battle of Bunker Hill, the Americans laid siege against the British in Boston. The long siege lasted for many months with neither side able to make any progress. At the urging of William Heath, Putnam used his experience working with British military engineers during the French and Indian war to build fortifications in Roxbury and other locations that were critical to the siege. After his initial success, he borrowed from Heath the book Attack and Defense of Fortified Places, by John Müller that showed him additional techniques for building defensive fortifications. Using Muller's ideas, Putnam devised a system for fortifying Dorchester Heights, overlooking Boston Harbor. Despite the frozen ground in early March, 1776, Putnam's plan of using timbers and fascines allowed the colonial troops to put up the defenses overnight allowing for the subsequent emplacement of artillery, brought from Fort Ticonderoga by Henry Knox weeks earlier, the next day. Putnam's success in establishing a fort in a matter of just hours took the British by surprise and left them in an untenable position, resulting in their evacuation of Boston by sea in the following weeks.

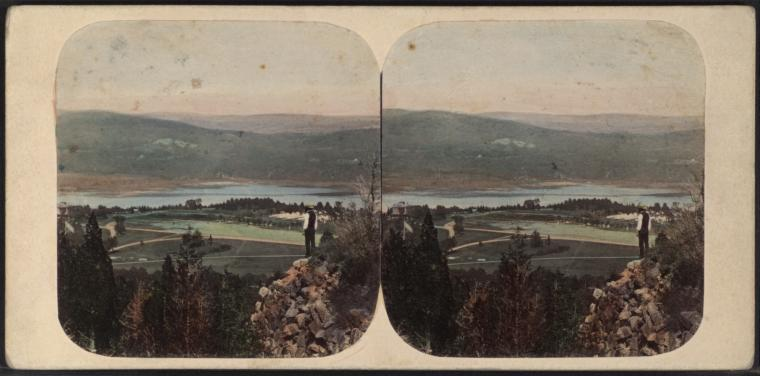
View of the West Point area from Fort Putnam.

General Washington appointed Putnam to be the Chief of Engineers of the Works of New York. He was soon promoted to engineer with the rank of colonel where he directed the building of fortifications which secured victories at Sewall's Point, Providence, Newport, Long Island, and West Point. In December, 1776, when the Continental Congress rejected his proposition to establish a national corps of engineers, Putnam resigned his commission. His resignation was short-lived and he eventually joined the Continental Army and served under Major General Horatio Gates. Putnam commanded two regiments in the battle of Saratoga. He continued to work on critical fortifications, including Fort Putnam at West Point in 1778. In 1779 Putnam served under Major General Anthony Wayne in the Corps of Light Infantry following the capture of Stony Point, commanding the 4th Regiment. Putnam's remaining military career was less eventful. In January 1783 he was commissioned as brigadier general.

== Post-war activities ==
After the war was over, Putnam returned to Rutland, Massachusetts. In 1780 he had bought a farm confiscated from a Loyalist, and he settled there. He returned to working as a surveyor, inspecting lands in Maine (then part of Massachusetts). Putnam was a strong advocate of granting lands to veterans of the Revolution. He was one of the authors of the army's Newburgh Petition, which was submitted to Congress requesting land disbursements in the new Ohio country to officers in payment for their military service. There was pent-up land hunger among younger men in New England, where topography and long settlement restricted buying land.

Putnam was an original member of the Society of the Cincinnati, and one of the principal benefactors of the Leicester Academy in Leicester, Massachusetts, and served on its board of trustees.

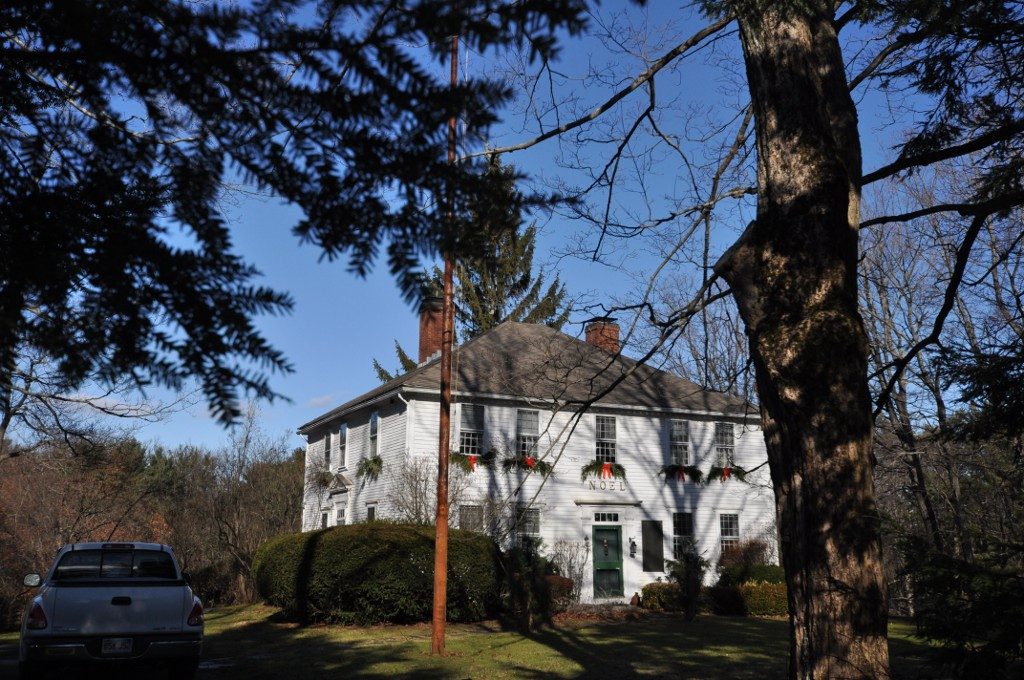
Putnam's house in Rutland, Massachusetts, still stands and is now a B&B.

=== The Ohio Company ===
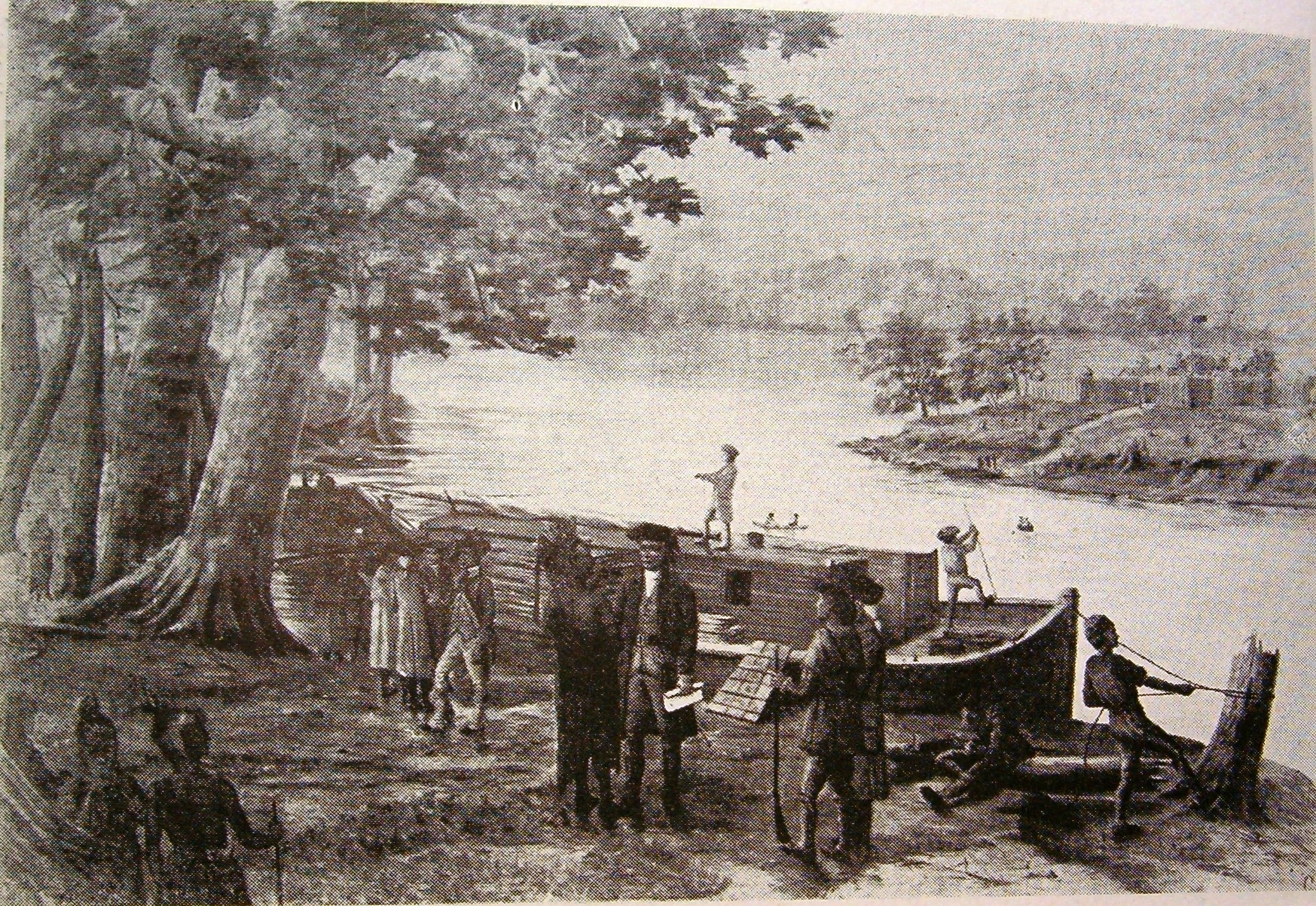
Arrival of Rufus Putnam and pioneers at the confluence of the Ohio and Muskingum rivers on April 7, 1788

Putnam's advocacy for land grants led him, with partners, to establish the Ohio Company of Associates for the purchase and settlement of Western lands. He established the Company in Boston on March 3, 1786, together with Benjamin Tupper, Samuel Holden Parsons, and Manasseh Cutler. Its primary purpose was to settle the Northwest Territory, roughly the lands between the Appalachian Mountains and the Mississippi River, which was ceded to the US by Great Britain under the Treaty of Paris (1783).

After passage of the Northwest Ordinance to organize the territory, the Company bought about 1,000,000 acres (4,000 km^{2}) of land north of the Ohio River, between the present day sites of Marietta, Ohio, and Huntington, West Virginia. Cutler had tried to purchase all the land between the Ohio and Scioto rivers, but the western half was optioned by the Scioto Company. It later failed without having purchased any of the land.

Putnam's 1788 mapping of the Marietta Earthworks was described as “the genesis of the science of archaeology in the United States” by archaeologist Henry Clyde Shetrone and is one of the first detailed European descriptions of North American earthworks.

=== Later life ===
In 1788 Putnam led a group of Revolutionary veterans to settle the land in what became Ohio. These pioneers arrived at the confluence of the Ohio and Muskingum rivers on April 7, 1788, where they established Marietta, Ohio, as the first European-American permanent United States settlement in the Northwest Territory. Putnam was appointed to serve as one of three judges of the Northwest Territory after Samuel Holden Parsons died.

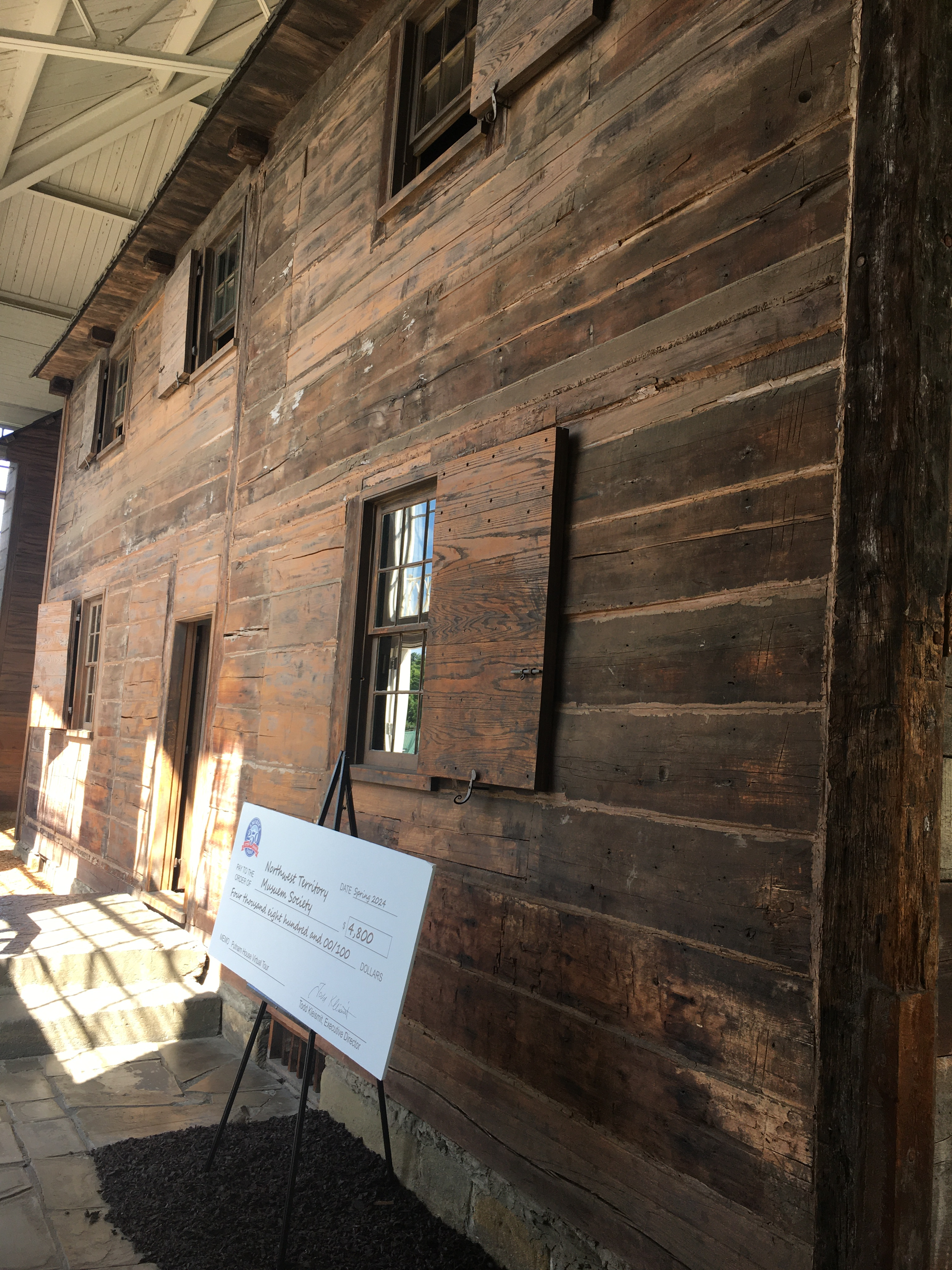
Rufus Putnam's home, which was part of the original stockade at Campus Martius, is now part of the Campus Martius Museum in Marietta, Ohio.

The territory had been historically occupied by Native American tribes, and more were driven west by colonial encroachment before the Revolution. As they had not ceded any land, they came into conflict with the arriving pioneers. They organized a coalition of tribes to try to expel the Americans from their territory.

From 1792 to 1793, Putnam served as a brigadier general in Anthony Wayne's Ohio campaign against these Native American tribes, including Shawnee, Lenape and Seneca, who were ultimately defeated. In 1796, Putnam was appointed by the President as the first Surveyor General of the United States, a position he held until 1803. As Ohio residents organized to write a constitution and be admitted as a state, in 1802 Putnam was elected a Washington county delegate to the Ohio Constitutional Convention.

He was appointed as a Trustee of Ohio University, where he served for two decades, from 1804 to 1824. It was constructed on public lands, under the terms of the Northwest Ordinance of 1787. Long participating in the Masons, a fraternal organization that expanded in the early nineteenth century, in 1808 Putnam was elected the first Grand Master of the Grand Lodge of Free & Accepted Masons of Ohio.

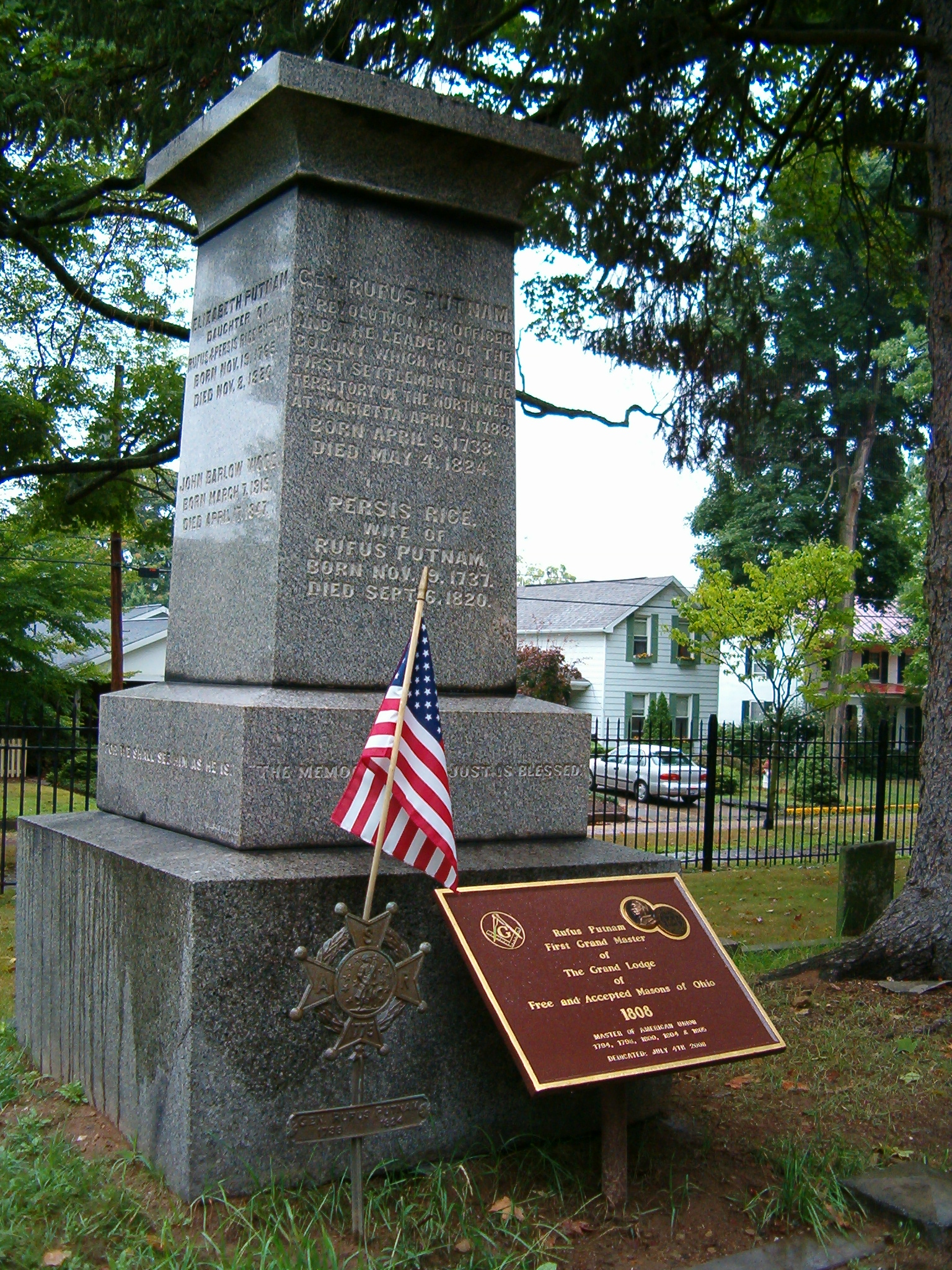
Rufus Putnam marker at Mound Cemetery, Marietta, Ohio

== Marriage and family ==
Established at work, in April 1761 Putnam married Elizabeth Ayers, the daughter of William Ayers, esquire of the Second Precinct of Brookfield (now North Brookfield), Massachusetts. Elizabeth died in 1762, possibly in childbirth.

On January 10, 1765, Putnam married again, to Persis Rice (1737–1820), the daughter of Zebulon Rice and Abigail Forbush Rice of Westborough, Massachusetts.

== Death ==
Putnam died on May 4, 1824. He was buried at Mound Cemetery in Marietta, Ohio.

== Legacy and honors ==
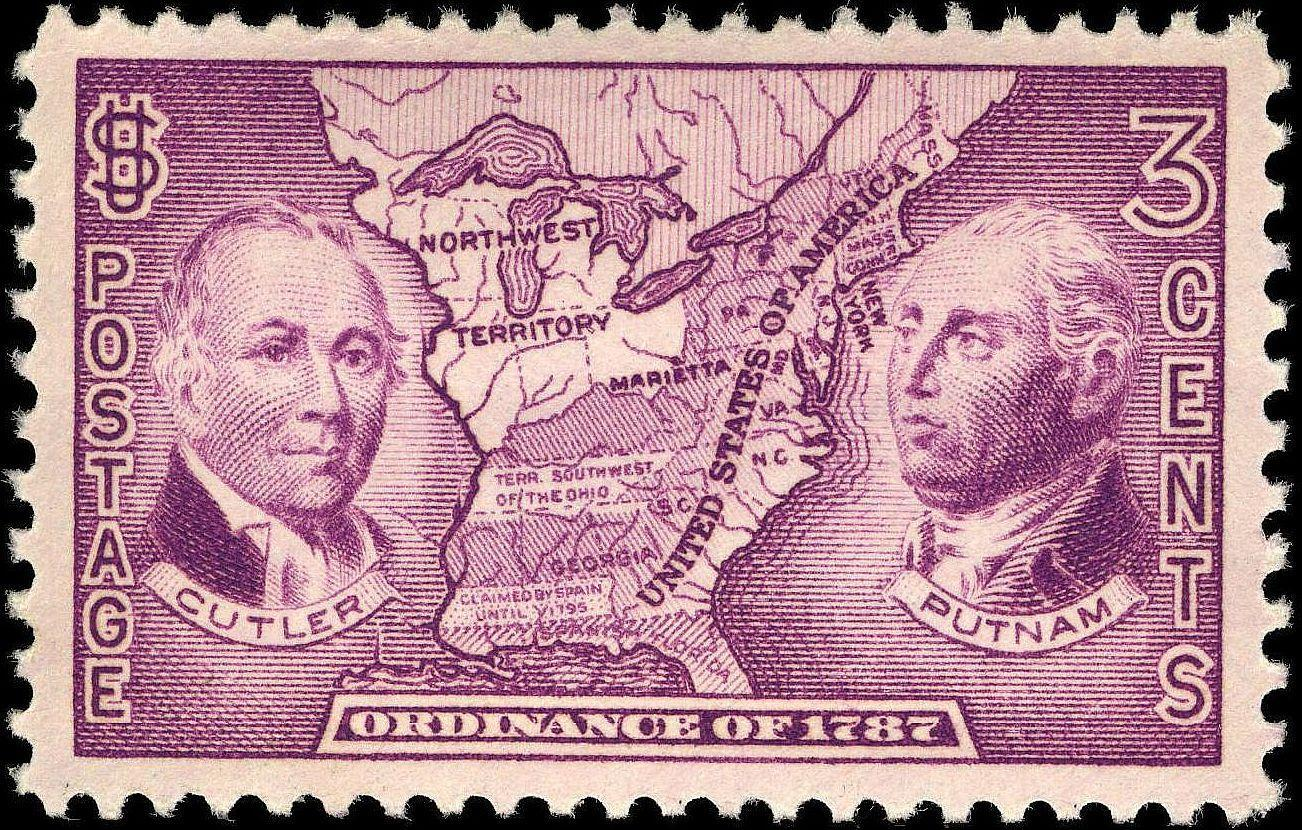
Ordinance of 1787 Commemorative stamp Issue of 1937

Rufus Putnam is depicted on a commemorative stamp issued on July 13, 1937, by the U.S. Post Office which commemorated the 150th anniversary of the North West Ordinance of 1787. The engraving on the stamp depicts a map of the United States at the time with the North West Territory between the figures of Putnam (right) and Manasseh Cutler.

Putnam's home in Marietta has been designated a National Historic Landmark in his honor. His home in Rutland, Massachusetts (the General Rufus Putnam House) is on the National Register of Historic Homes and is currently being operated as a B&B. The town of Putnam, Ohio (now a part of Zanesville, Ohio) was named for him. Fort Putnam (built by Rufus Putnam) is part of the U.S. Military Academy at West Point, New York. One of his grandsons, Catharinus Putnam Buckingham, served as a brigadier general in the Union Army during the American Civil War.

Ohio University's mascot Rufus the Bobcat is named in honor of Putnam.

== Bibliography ==
- Barker, Joseph: Recollections of the First Settlement of Ohio, Marietta College, Marietta, Ohio (1958); original manuscript written late in Joseph Barker's life, prior to his death in 1843.
- Buell, Rowena, ed.: The Memoirs of Rufus Putnam and Certain Official Papers and Correspondence, Houghton, Mifflin, and Co., The Riverside Press, Cambridge, Massachusetts (1903). Available online as part of the California Digital Library at The memoirs of Rufus Putnam and certain official papers and correspondence
- Dawes, E. C.: Journal of Gen. Rufus Putnam kept in Northern New York during Four Campaigns of the old French and Indian War, Joel Munsell's Sons, Albany, New York (1886).
- Heitman, Francis B.: Officers of the Continental Army during the War of the Revolution, Rare Book Shop Publishing Co., Washington, D.C. (1914).
- Hildreth, S. P.: Biographical and Historical Memoirs of the Early Pioneer Settlers of Ohio, H. W. Derby and Co., Cincinnati, Ohio (1852).
- Hildreth, S. P.: Pioneer History: Being an Account of the First Examinations of the Ohio Valley, and the Early Settlement of the Northwest Territory, H. W. Derby and Co., Cincinnati, Ohio (1848). This historical book is available online via the Google Books Library Project at Early Settlement of the Northwest Territory.
- Hubbard, Robert Ernest. General Rufus Putnam: George Washington's Chief Military Engineer and "Father of Ohio", McFarland & Company, Jefferson, North Carolina, 2020. ISBN 9781476678627.
- Hubbard, Robert Ernest. Major General Israel Putnam: Hero of the American Revolution, McFarland & Company, Jefferson, North Carolina, 2017. ISBN 978-1-4766-6453-8.
- Hulbert, Archer Butler: The Records of the Original Proceedings of the Ohio Company, Volume I, Marietta Historical Commission, Marietta, Ohio (1917). This historical book is available online via the Google Books Library Project at Ohio Company, Volume I.
- Hulbert, Archer Butler: The Records of the Original Proceedings of the Ohio Company, Volume II, Marietta Historical Commission, Marietta, Ohio (1917). This historical book is available online via the Google Books Library Project at Ohio Company, Volume II.
- Leiter, M. T.: Biographical Sketches of the Generals of the Continental Army of the Revolution, University Press: John Wilson and Son, Cambridge, Massachusetts (1889).
- Summers, Thomas J.: History of Marietta, The Leader Publishing Co., Marietta, Ohio (1903). This historical book is available online via the Google Books Library Project at History of Marietta.
- Randall, Emilius Oviatt (1850–1919): Rufus Putnam Memorial Association, Ohio Archæological and Historical Society Publications: Volume 20 [1911], pp. 123–33.

Military offices
Preceded by Colonel Richard Gridley	Chief Engineer of the Continental Army; April – December 1776	Succeeded by Major-General Louis Duportail
Legal offices
Preceded by Samuel Holden Parsons	Judge of the Northwest Territory; March 1790 – December, 1796	Succeeded by Joseph Gilman
Government offices
Preceded by new office	Surveyor General of the Northwest Territory; 1797–1803	Succeeded by Jared Mansfield
