= Damar, Murgul =

Damar
- Village
- Location within Turkey
- Coordinates: 41°15′N 41°35′E
- Country: Turkey
- Province: Artvin
- District: Murgul
- Elevation: 1,030 m (3,380 ft)
- Population (2021): 449
- Time zone: UTC+3 (TRT)
- Postal code: 08510
- Area code: 0466

Damar (meaning mineral ore) is a village in the Murgul District, Artvin Province, Turkey. It lies just to the south east of Murgul. The town was once a district center, but in 1950 its status was reduced to a township (belde). At the 2013 reorganisation, it became a village. Damar is a mining town and is one of the main producers of copper in Turkey.

== Population ==
Historical population
Year	Pop.	±% p.a.
2007	1,440	—
2012	2,167	+8.52%
2017	489	−25.75%
2021	449	−2.11%
Source: TÜIK (2007-2021)

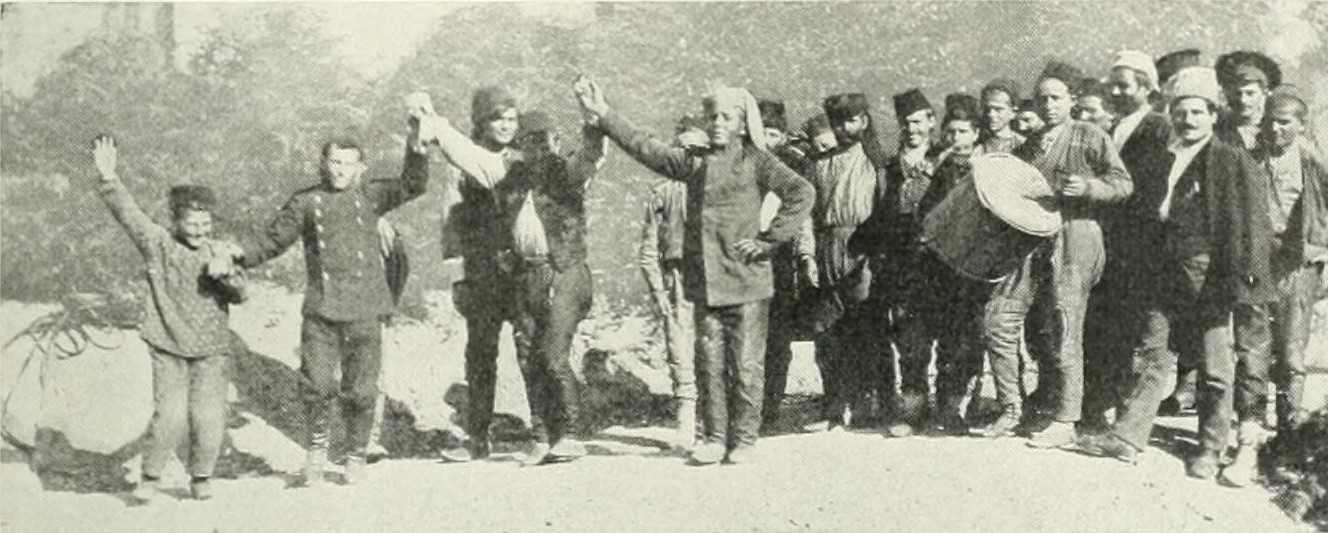
miners of Dzansul (now Damar), 1915

== See also ==
- Damar mine
