= De Mars, Gelderland =

De Mars
- Hamlet
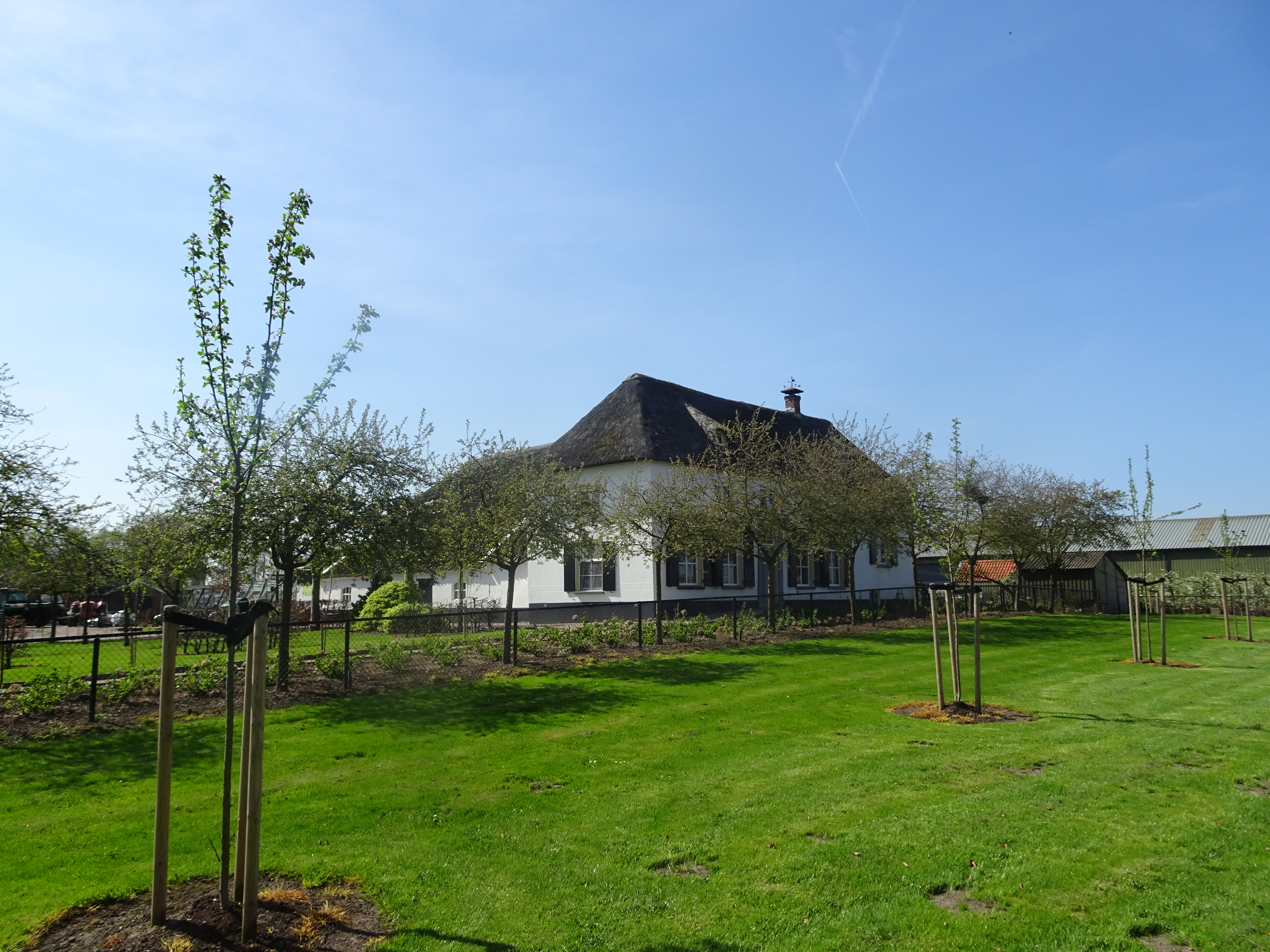
- Farm in De Mars

- Location in the province of Gelderland De Mars (Netherlands)
- Coordinates: 51.95271°N 5.53440°E
- Country: Netherlands
- Province: Gelderland
- Municipality: Buren

Area
  - Total: 7.29 km^{2} (2.81 sq mi)
- Elevation: 7 m (23 ft)

Population (2021)
  - Total: 295
  - Density: 40.5/km^{2} (105/sq mi)
- Time zone: UTC+1 (CET)
  - Summer (DST): UTC+2 (CEST)
- Postal code: 4033
- Dialing code: 0344

De Mars is a hamlet in the Dutch province of Gelderland. It is a part of the municipality of Buren, and lies about 8 km south of Veenendaal.

The area belonging to De Mars was originally located north of the Rhine river. However, the river bed now runs along a new route north of De Mars.

It was first mentioned in 1250 as in Marsche, and means "in the marsh". In 1840, it was home to 219 people. The postal authorities have placed it under Lienden.
