= Marchfield (assembly) =

Public Assemblies in the Middle Ages

The Marchfield (Latin: Campus Martius), later called the Mayfield (Campus Madius), was an annual assembly of the Franks between the 6th and 8th centuries. The Lombards had a similar custom in the 8th century.

There is no reference to an annual "field of March" (campus Martius) from the Merovingian period (481–751). The earliest reference is from the early Carolingian period (751–888). Thus, the evidence for the Marchfield in the Merovingian period is indirect. For example, King Childebert II (575–596) promulgated edicts at three assemblies on March 1 in the last decade of his reign. The assembly may not have happened every year nor necessarily opened March 1, but there was an expectation that a major assembly would be held around that time.

The Marchfield was a military and political assembly and men came armed. It was in effect a mustering of the army, and may have had its origins in the Franks' service as foederati in the Roman army. It could decide on war, in which case a campaign would begin immediately. There is no evidence in Merovingian sources, however, that campaigns were more likely to begin in March or early spring than any other time of the year. The Marchfield was also a place for royal patronage, the meting out of rewards and punishments and maintaining a direct link between the king and the soldiery. The assembly could also act as a tribunal, trying persons accused of high treason. It was also an occasion for kings to issue capitularies.

The Marchfield appears to have been instituted in Lombard Italy in the 8th century. This was an assembly for enacting laws. All of the dated laws of kings Liutprand, Ratchis and Aistulf are dated March 1.
