= Murgul =

- Municipality
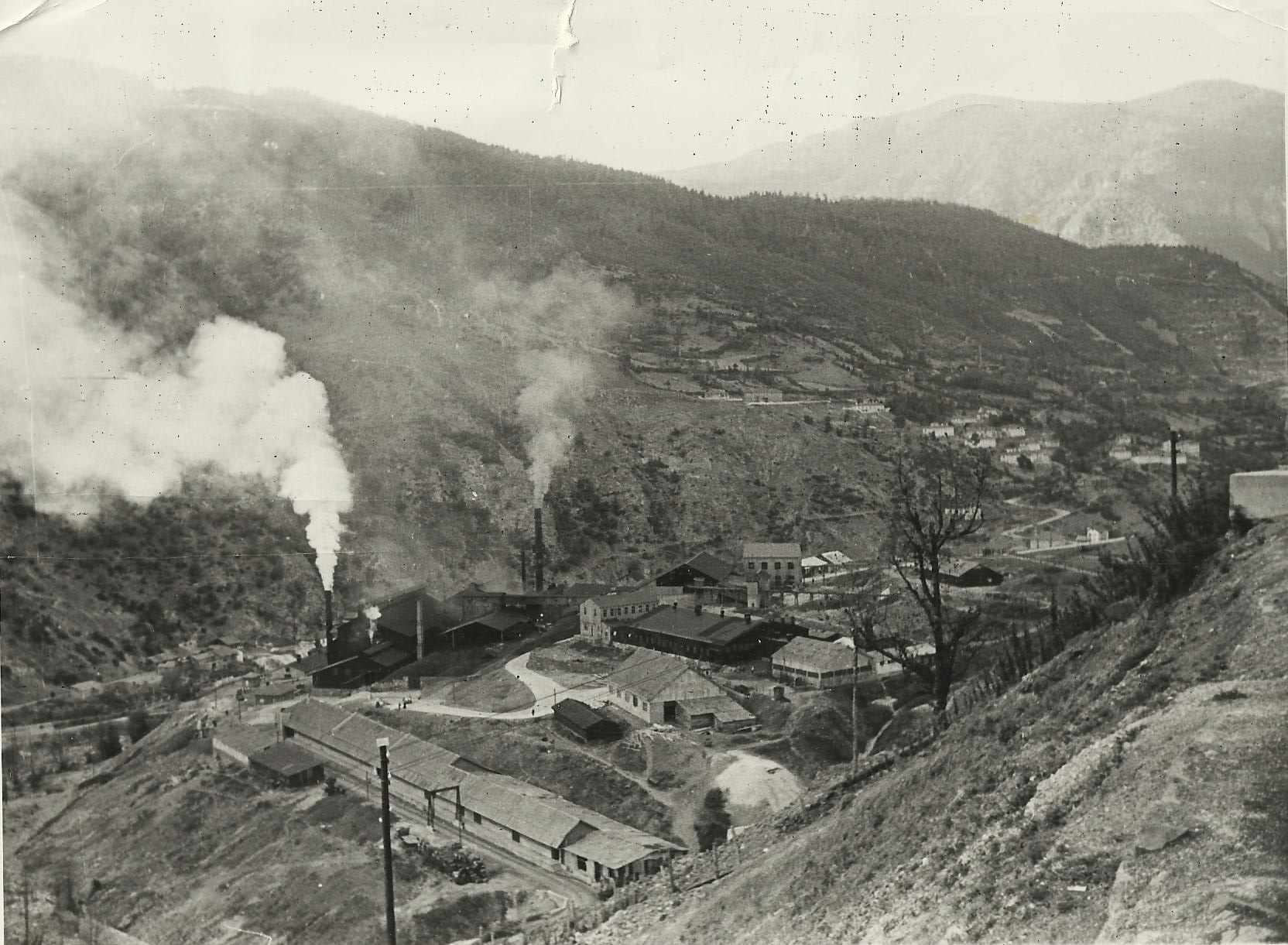
- Murgul in the 1960's

- Location within Turkey
- Coordinates: 41°16′32″N 41°33′59″E
- Country: Turkey
- Province: Artvin
- District: Murgul

Government
  - Mayor: Mehmet Yıldırım (CHP)
- Elevation: 473 m (1,552 ft)
- Population (2021): 5,020
- Time zone: UTC+3 (TRT)
- Postal code: 08800
- Climate: Cfb
- Website: murgul.bel.tr

Murgul (Laz and Georgian: მურღული/Murghuli) is a town in Artvin Province in the Black Sea region of Turkey. It is the seat of Murgul District. Its population is 5,020 (2021).

Previously known as Damar and Göktaş, Murgul is on a tributary of the Çoruh River, with mountains on all sides.

Half of the land is mountain forest and most of the other half is meadow, only 5% is planted. There are various mining and mineral operations especially copper (Murgul has Turkey's largest copper reserve) and also iron and nitrates.

== Climate ==
Murgul has an oceanic climate (Köppen: Cfb).

Climate data for Murgul
Month	Jan	Feb	Mar	Apr	May	Jun	Jul	Aug	Sep	Oct	Nov	Dec	Year
Daily mean °C (°F)	3.2 (37.8)	4.1 (39.4)	6.6 (43.9)	10.9 (51.6)	14.6 (58.3)	17.9 (64.2)	20.7 (69.3)	20.9 (69.6)	18.1 (64.6)	14.0 (57.2)	9.6 (49.3)	5.4 (41.7)	12.2 (54.0)
Average precipitation mm (inches)	139 (5.5)	111 (4.4)	92 (3.6)	82 (3.2)	74 (2.9)	102 (4.0)	84 (3.3)	105 (4.1)	132 (5.2)	163 (6.4)	157 (6.2)	173 (6.8)	1,414 (55.6)
Source: Climate-Data-org
