= Surveyor General of the Northwest Territory =

Former US government official

- Constituting instrument: Land Act of 1796
- First holder: Rufus Putnam
- Final holder: Lucius Lyon
- Abolished: June 1845
- Succession: Commissioner of the General Land Office
- Salary: $2,000

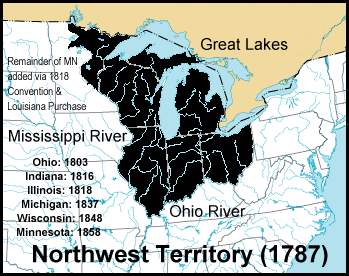

A system of survey of public lands of the United States under the Land Act of 1796.

The Surveyor General of the Northwest Territory was a United States government official responsible for surveying land in the Northwest Territory in the United States late in the late 18th and early 19th century. The position was created in the Land Act of 1796 to survey lands ceded by Native Americans northwest of the Ohio River and above the mouth of the Kentucky River. This act, and those that followed evolved into the Public Land Survey System.

Rufus Putnam was appointed to the office in 1797, and held it until 1803. His office was in Marietta. In 1801, the position was offered to Andrew Ellicott by Thomas Jefferson, but he refused, because he was upset at slow pay for work he had done for the federal government. Jared Mansfield held the office from 1803 to 1813. His office was in Cincinnati. Josiah Meigs held office 1813 to 1815, and Edward Tiffin from 1815 to his death in 1829. Tiffin had his office in Chillicothe. The Surveyor General of Illinois office was created on April 29, 1816, reducing effective area to Ohio, Indiana and Michigan. William Lytle served 1829 until his death in 1831. He moved the office back to Cincinnati. Micajah T. Williams held the office 1831 to 1834, when Robert Todd Lytle took over. Ezekiel S. Haines was appointed in 1838. Judge William Johnston held the office 1841–1845 as thanks for his efforts in supporting the Whig ticket in 1840. Lucius Lyon was appointed in 1845, and moved his office to Detroit. In June 1845, the Ohio and Indiana offices were closed, and subsequent surveys were made under the Commissioner of the General Land Office. The Surveyor General was initially paid $2000 per year, and his deputies were paid three dollars per mile surveyed.

Putnam was occupied in 1797 with laying off the Greenville Treaty Line and surveying the United States Military District and Moravian Indian Grants, and he started the survey of Congress Lands in 1798.

Mansfield is credited with "considerable scientific ability and high standards of workmanship". He laid out astronomically the Indiana baseline and Second Principal Meridian, in spite of the difficulties. Pressures on him are illustrated in a letter Secretary of the Treasury Albert Gallatin wrote to Mansfield: "The new act (March 13, 1805) is intended to palliate errors made in surveys north of the Ohio. At four dollars per mile, great correctness cannot be attained in that part of the country. Do your best at that price. Congress desires that corners and boundaries be definitely fixed, and the precise content of each is not equally important. A few acres more or less is not so important as it is that corners and boundaries should be known with precision to avoid litigation. It is of primary importance that the land should be surveyed and subdivided".

Tiffin established the scheme of guide meridians and standard parallels for townships distant from the principal meridians and baselines, which became a feature of the Public Land Survey System.

On March 3, 1803, a Surveyor General position was created for lands south of Tennessee, and there followed a number of similar positions over the next years. In 1822, the first surveying district was created, namely the state of Ohio, with an officer called Surveyor General in charge.

Until the re-organization of the United States General Land Office in 1836, each Surveyor General acted more or less independently, setting his own standards for execution of field work.

== See also ==
- Northwest Territory
