= Zane's Tracts =

Parcels of land in the Northwest Territory of the U.S.

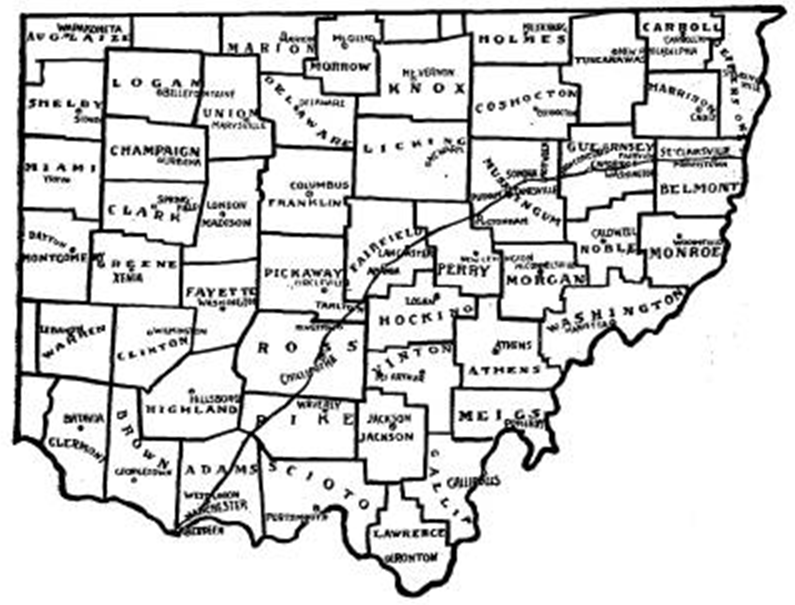
Zane's Trace in shown in southern Ohio.

Zane's Tracts were three parcels of land in the Northwest Territory of the United States, later Ohio, that the federal government granted to Ebenezer Zane late in the 18th century, as compensation for establishing a road with ferry service over several rivers.

== History ==
Ebenezer Zane was born in the east in 1747. He traveled west in 1767, taking the Cumberland Trail to Brownsville, Pennsylvania. In 1770, Zane and two brothers settled along Wheeling Creek along the Ohio River in Virginia, founding Wheeling, Virginia, later West Virginia. Zane and his brother Jonathan Zane gained considerable knowledge of the lands across the Ohio River, in what is now Ohio.

The late 1780s and early 1790s was a time of considerable bloodshed along the frontier during the Northwest Indian War, which formally ended with the 1795 Treaty of Greenville. With peace, settlement would accelerate. In March, 1796, Ebenezer Zane presented a petition to Congress to establish a road, (trace), between Wheeling and Limestone, Kentucky, (today Maysville). As compensation, Zane asked for a grant of land at three river crossings, where he would establish ferry service. A committee recommended action, and vouched for Zane's competence and character, and the general utility of the road.

== Congressional Action ==
The congress approved the Act of May 17, 1796, which said “…there shall be granted to Ebenezer Zane three tracts of land, not exceeding one mile square each, one on the Muskingum River, one on the Hockhocking river, and one on the north bank of the Sciota river, and in such situations as shall best promote the utility of a road to be opened by him on the most eligible route between Wheeling and Limestone…”, provided that Zane pay for his own surveys, and return plats to the Treasury department with military land bounty warrants for the surveyed number of acres. He also was required to have a road opened by Jan 1, 1797, and have ferries established at the river crossings, with rates approved by judges of the Northwest Territory.

== Trace Established ==
The work of building the trace began in summer 1796, with Jonathan Zane, John McIntire (Ebenezer Zane's son-in-law) and a number of others doing the work. They followed Indian trails where possible, and previously established trails west of the Scioto river. They did not finish until some months after the January 1, 1797 agreement, in the summer of 1797, but president Adams issued patents for the three tracts along the rivers anyway in 1800. The surveys for the tracts Zane acquired were completed as indiscriminate surveys before the surrounding lands were surveyed, and so do not correspond to sections or township lines in the later surveys.

== Surveys ==
Ebenezer Zane's Surveys
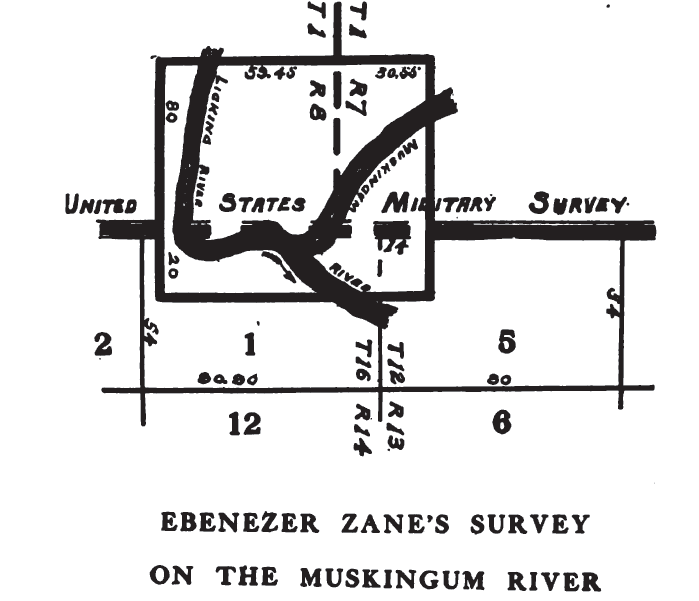
Muskingum River

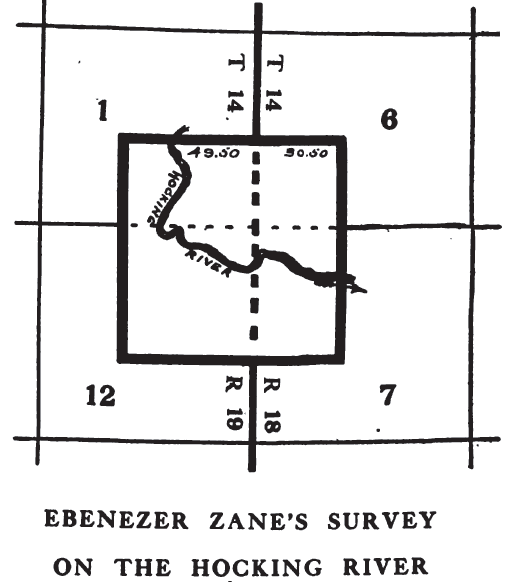
Hocking River

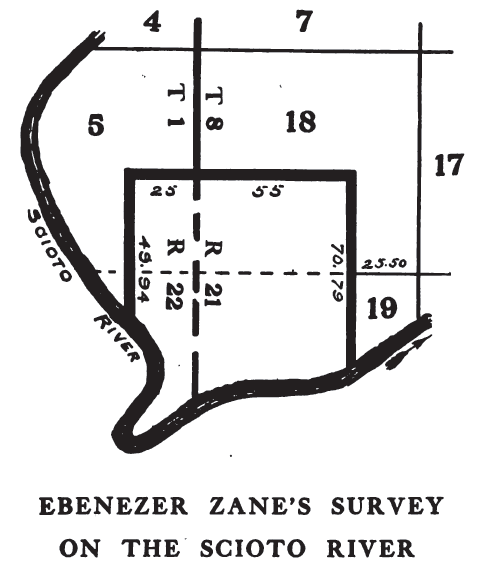
Scioto River

=== Survey on Muskingum ===
The tract Zane chose for a ferry on the Muskingum River was at the confluence with the Licking river, where he laid out the town of Zanesville, Ohio in 1799. The survey was directed by Rufus Putnam in 1797. Zane gave this tract to his brother Jonathan, and son-in-law McIntire, with the deed finally signed in December 1800, for their services in laying out the road. They, in turn, leased it to William McCullough, (a relative), and Henry Crooks for five years, provided they operated the ferry. McCullough and Crooks became the first residents of Zanesville in fall 1797. The tract lies partially in what would be the United States Military District, in township 1 range 7 (T1 R7), and T1 R8 and partially in the Congress Lands East of Scioto River in T12 R13 and T16 R14. 39°56′26″N 82°00′51″W

=== Survey on Hocking ===
The town of Lancaster, Ohio was laid out in 1800, or 1799, at the site of the Hocking river ferry, by Ebenezer's sons, John and Noah Zane. These two had power of attorney to sell lots for Ebenezer Zane, and he never visited Lancaster. The tract lies in T14 R18 and T14 R19 of the Congress Lands East of Scioto River. 39°42′30″N 82°36′14″W

=== Survey on Scioto ===
Ebenezer Zane chose a site across from Chillicothe, Ohio, and about a half mile north of the town. The survey lies in T8 R21 and T1 R22 of the Congress Lands East of Scioto River 39°20′53″N 82°58′14″W

== Isaac Zane Tracts ==
Ebenezer Zane's youngest brother was called Isaac Zane. He was taken captive by Indians at age nine, and taken to Detroit. He grew up there, and, as an adult, acted as an intermediary between the United States and the Indians. By act of April 3, 1802, Congress granted Isaac Zane three sections of land for his services, two of those sections reserved for his heirs at the time of his death. On August 28, 1806, patents were issued for section 15, T5, R12 in the Between the Miami Rivers Survey in fee, in Salem Township Champaign County, and in trust for the benefit of heirs at the time of his death for section 14, T5, R12 in the same township and section 2 T4 R12 in Concord Township, Champaign county.

== See also ==
- Ohio Lands
- Historic regions of the United States
- Zane's Trace
