= Salt Reservations =

Collection of land tracts in the Midwest of the USA

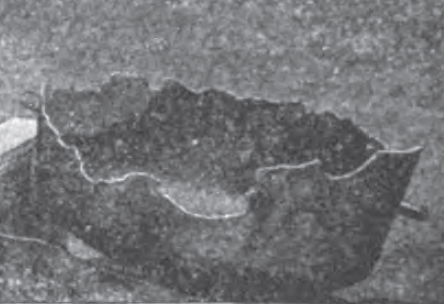
First salt kettle in Ohio, seen at Marietta centennial.

The Salt Reservations (also known as the Salt Lands) were a collection of land tracts surrounding salt springs in Ohio and some other states that were donated to the states by the federal government early in the 19th century.

The United States had acquired the lands northwest of the Ohio River at the 1783 Treaty of Paris after the American Revolutionary War, and these lands were finally open to settlement. Leaders knew that in frontier lands such as the Ohio Country, salt was a precious and scarce commodity, especially for preserving meat in an era before refrigeration. Americans knew from explorers and Indians of the presence of springs of water containing salt. So that no one would buy the land upon which salt springs sat, and thus acquire a monopoly of a rare necessity of life, the national government reserved land from public sale on which salt springs were found.

== Federal Action ==
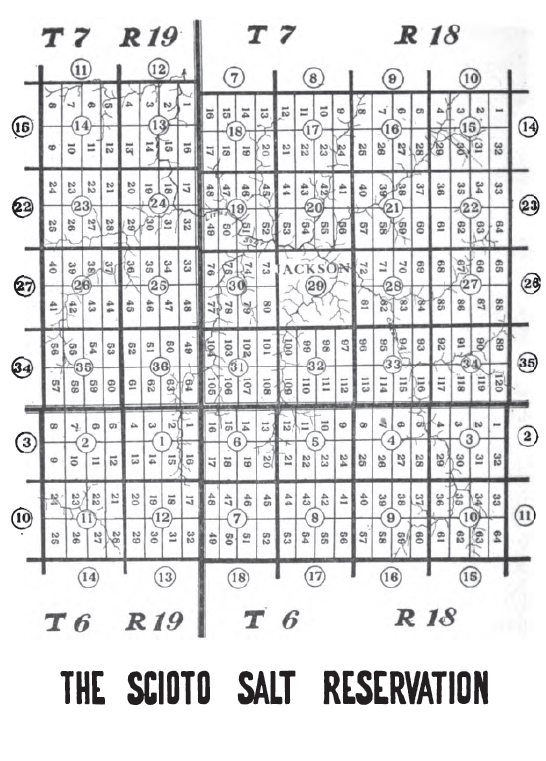
The Scioto Salt Reservation in Jackson county, Ohio

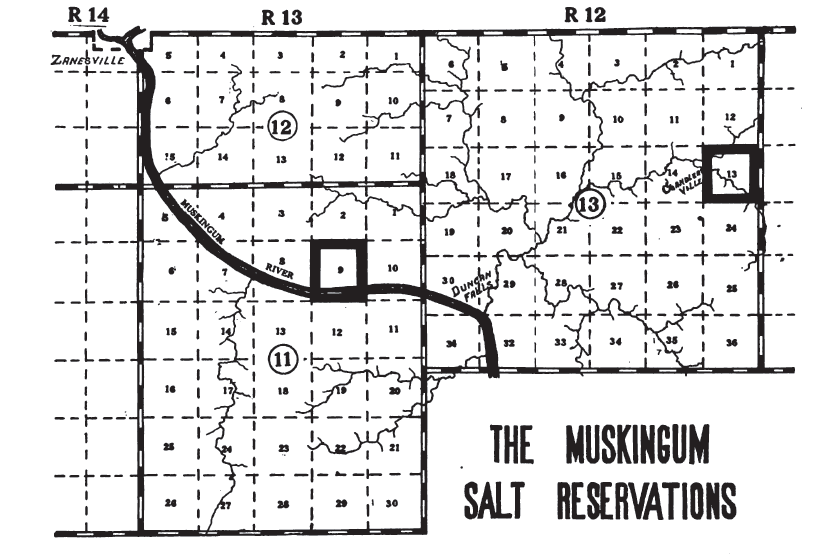
The Muskingum Salt Reservations

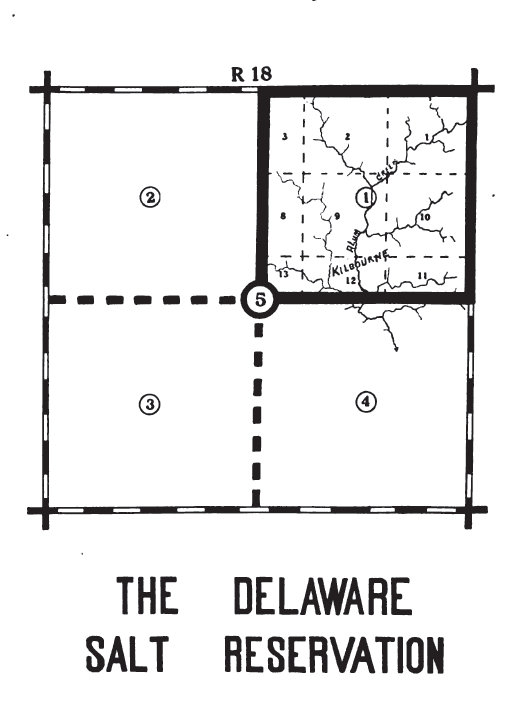
The Delaware Salt Reservation, Ohio

In 1796, Congress passed two pieces of legislation to regulate the surveying and sale, or other dispersal, of public lands northwest of the Ohio River that had not yet been sold or surveyed. The first of these was the Land Act of May 18, 1796 This act called for the land to be surveyed into townships 6 miles (9.7 km) on a side, arranged in a checkerboard pattern, and further divided into sections of 1-mile (1.6 km) square that will be sold to the public. Section 3 of this act states, "That a salt spring lying upon a creek which empties into the Sciota river, on the east side, and as many contiguous sections as shall be equal to one township, and every other salt spring which may be discovered, together with the section of one mile square which includes it ... shall be reserved, for the future disposal of the United States." Subsequent surveys identified two additional salt springs near the Muskingum River.

The second relevant congressional action in 1796 was the creation of the United States Military District in eastern Ohio. The government did not have adequate funds to pay soldiers during the Revolutionary War. Instead, they were promised land grants, called bounties, dependent on rank, after the conclusion of the war. The Act of June 1, 1796 set aside a district, described how to survey it, and how to distribute the bounties. Section 1 of this act also reserved tracts, in this act, (squares 2 ½ miles on a side), around any salt springs that might be found. Subsequent surveys revealed one salt spring in what is now Delaware county.

Around the turn of the century, the population of the territory increased to the point that statehood became the next logical step. On April 30, 1802, the Ohio Enabling Act set forth the boundaries of the new state and arranged for the election of delegates to a state constitutional convention to meet later that year. The Second proposition of Section 7 of the act states "That the six mile reservation, including the salt springs, commonly called the Scioto salt springs, the salt springs near the Muskingum river, and in the military tract, with the sections of land which include the same, shall be granted to the said state for the use of the people thereof, the same to be used under such terms and conditions and regulations as the legislature of the said state shall direct: Provided, the said legislature shall never sell nor lease the same for a longer period than ten years."

== State Action ==
The state legislature provided for leasing these lands for salt production. They were cared for by agents, and rental was charged for the right to make salt. In 1803 the rental was three cents per year for each gallon of kettle capacity used in boiling the water. The rental rate declined periodically until, by 1810, the rental rate was just five mills (½ cent).

The Scioto salt springs were extensively developed. The salt was carried by packhorse to settlements and sold for up to eight dollars per hundred pounds in 1801. The salt springs on the Muskingum were also worked, but the Delaware county springs invited little attention.

== Tract Location ==
=== Scioto Salt Reservation ===
The reservation was in the survey called the Congress Lands East of Scioto River in present-day Jackson County, Ohio. It consisted of eight sections of township 6, range 18, four sections of township 6, range 19, sixteen sections of township 7, range 18, and eight sections of township 7, range 19. 39°02′53″N 82°38′02″W

By 1816, a settlement had grown around the spring, and Ohio wished to form Jackson county. They petitioned Congress to allow sale of a section of salt land to pay for a county courthouse. The Act of April 16, 1816 allowed this action, and section 29 of township 7 of range 18 was sold for $7,169.00, and the town of Jackson was erected there. The remainder of the reserve was surveyed into 80-acre (320,000 m^{2}) tracts, numbered in each township in a like manner as the sections.

=== Muskingum Salt Reservations ===
The reservations were two 640-acre (2.6 km^{2}) sections of land in Muskingum County, Ohio, section 13 of township 13 of range 12 39°53′59″N 81°49′14″W, and section 9 of township 11 of range 13 39°52′41″N 81°56′48″W of the Congress Lands East of Scioto River

=== Delaware Salt Reservation ===
The reservation was a four thousand acre (16 km²) tract of land in Delaware County, Ohio consisting of quarter 1 of township 5 of range 18 of the United States Military District 40°20′39″N 82°56′54″W

== Sale of Salt Lands ==
By 1824, salt springs had been found to be not so rare as previously thought, and worries over monopolization diminished. Ohio petitioned Congress to sell the rest of the salt lands. The Act of December 28, 1824 allowed this sale, with "the proceeds thereof to be applied to such literary purposes as the legislature may hereafter direct; and to no other use, intent, or purpose whatsoever."

== Other States ==
Some other states were granted six sections around each salt spring, as in the table, which may be incomplete.

| STATE | NUMBER OF SPRINGS | ACRES | ACT OF CONGRESS |
|---|---|---|---|
| Indiana | six | 23040 | 3 Stat. 289 April 19, 1816 |
| Illinois | All | 121029 | 3 Stat. 428 April 18, 1818 |
| Missouri | twelve | 46080 | 3 Stat. 545 March 6, 1820 |
| Alabama | six | 23040 | 3 Stat. 489 March 2, 1819 |
| Michigan | twelve | 46080 | 5 Stat. 59 June 23, 1836 |
| Arkansas | twelve | 46080 | 5 Stat. 58 June 23, 1836 |
| Iowa | twelve | 46080 | 5 Stat. 789 March 3, 1845 |
| Minnesota | twelve | 46080 | 11 Stat. 166 February 26, 1857 |
| Oregon | twelve | 46080 | 11 Stat. 383 February 14, 1859 |
| Kansas | twelve | 46080 | 12 Stat. 126 January 29, 1861 |
| Nebraska | twelve | 46080 | 13 Stat. 47 April 19, 1864 |

== Saline Lands Act ==
In 1877, Congress changed the treatment of saline lands. The Act of January 12, 1877 was called An act providing for the sale of Saline lands. It provided that any lands determined by the officers of a land office to be saline in character

... shall be offered for sale by public auction at the local land office of the district in which the same shall be situated, under such regulations as shall be prescribed by the Commissioner of the United States General Land Office, and sold to the highest bidder for cash, at a price of not less than one dollar and twenty five cents per acre ..... Provided, That the foregoing enactments shall not apply to any State or Territory which has not had a grant of salines by act of Congress, nor to any State which may have had such a grant, until either the grant has been fully satisfied, or the right of selection thereunder has expired by efflux of time.

— Act of January 12, 1877

== See also ==
- Ohio Lands
- Historic regions of the United States
