= Congress Lands East of Scioto River =

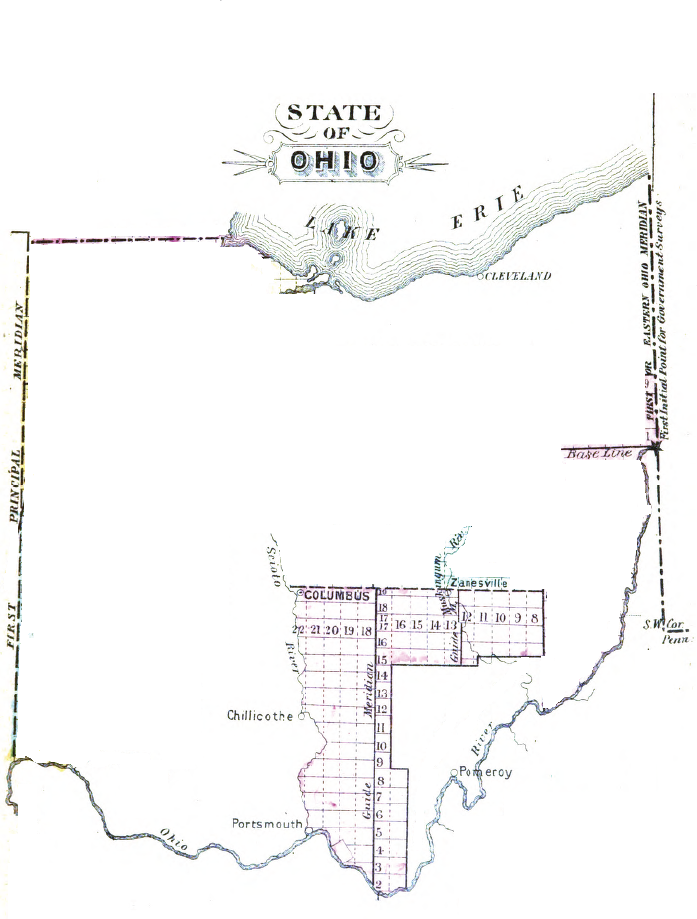
The Congress Lands East of the Scioto River

The Congress Lands East of Scioto River was a land tract in southern Ohio that was established by the Congress late in the 18th century. It is located south of the United States Military District and Refugee Tract, west of the Old Seven Ranges, east of the Virginia Military District and north of the Ohio River, French Grant, and the Ohio Company of Associates.

== History ==
Acquired by Great Britain from France following the 1763 Treaty of Paris, the Ohio Country had been closed to white settlement by the Proclamation of 1763. The United States claimed the region after the 1783 Treaty of Paris that ended the American Revolutionary War. The Congress passed the Land Ordinance of 1785 as a formal means of surveying, selling, and settling the land and raising revenue. The land was to be systematically surveyed into square "townships", six miles (9.656 km) on a side created by lines running north–south intersected by east–west lines. Townships were to be arranged in north–south rows called ranges. These townships were sub-divided into thirty-six "sections" of one square mile (2.59 km^{2}) or 640 acres. These ranges, townships, and sections were to be systematically numbered.

The first north–south line, Eastern Ohio Meridian, was to be the western boundary of Pennsylvania, sometimes called Ellicott's Line after Andrew Ellicott, who had been in charge of surveying it, and the first east–west line (called the Geographer's Line or Base Line) was to begin where the Pennsylvania boundary touched the north bank of the Ohio River, the Beginning Point of the U.S. Public Land Survey (40°38′33″N 80°31′10″W). The Geographer's Line was to extend westward through “the whole territory” which at that time was meant to include lands lying between the Ohio River and Lake Erie.

A problem with this plan was that Connecticut had a claim on lands north of the 41st parallel north latitude. Thus, on May 9, 1786, Congress instructed Thomas Hutchins, Geographer of the United States, to continue his survey only south of the Geographers line. Hutchins group completed surveying seven ranges by 1787 and presented plats to Congress in 1788 for the tract that became known as the Seven Ranges.

In 1784, Congress granted a tract of land west of the Scioto River to the state of Virginia for land grants to their American Revolutionary War veterans, known as the Virginia Military District.

The Ohio Company of Associates purchased a land tract adjacent to the west of the Seven Ranges in 1787 and began settlement and surveying in 1788. In 1792 Congress donated a tract of land to the company known as the Donation Tract, and the company purchased additional lands known as the Second Purchase or Purchase on the Muskingum.

In 1795, Congress granted a land tract adjacent to the Ohio River, in far southern Ohio located between the Scioto River and the Ohio Company lands, to French Immigrants who had been defrauded. This became known as the French Grant.

On June 1, 1796, Congress created the United States Military District, sometimes called the USMD Lands, or USMD Survey. The district was west of the Old Seven Ranges, east of the Scioto River, and south of the Greenville Treaty Line.

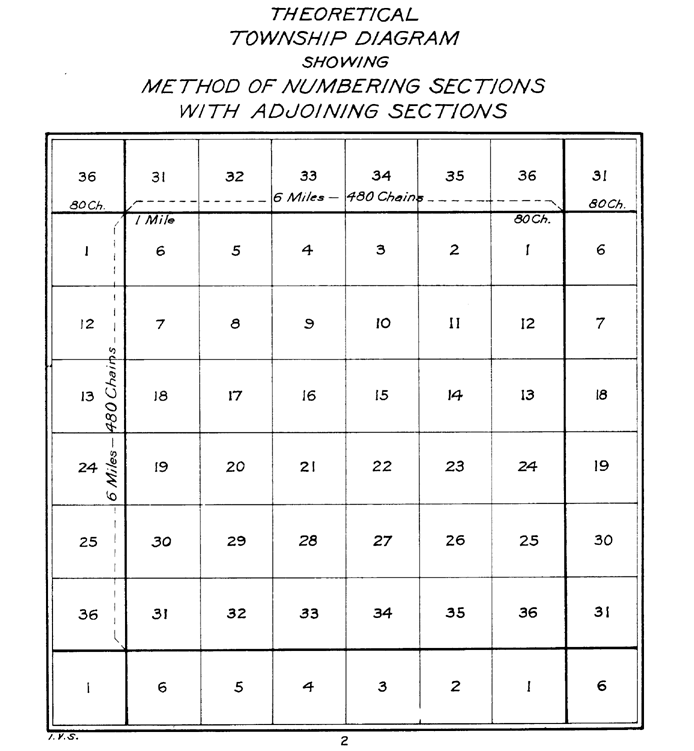
United States General Land Office plan for numbering sections of a standard survey township, adopted May 18, 1796

== The survey ==
After the previously mentioned surveys, an unsurveyed tract of land in southern Ohio remained east of the Scioto River. In that tract, lands were surveyed starting in 1799 under the Act of May 18, 1796. The ranges and townships followed those of the original Seven Ranges, ranges being numbered westward from Pennsylvania, and townships within each range numbered from south to north starting at the Ohio River, known as the Ohio River Base, and some in ranges 22 and 23 from the Scioto River, the Scioto River Base Surveys, thus having townships in adjacent ranges with different numbers. Sections were numbered according to the 1796 pattern. A number of irregularities in applying the system occur due to surveying errors, multiple surveys and erratic numbering.

Beginning in 1801, a strip of 103,527 acres (418.96 km^{2}) along the north edge of the tract was donated by Congress to refugees from Canada that became known as the Refugee Tract.

=== Land sales ===
Section 4 of the Land Act of May 18, 1796, provided that the lands in the survey area be sold at “Pittsburg”. The Land Act of May 10, 1800, established an Land Office and Land District at Chillicothe for sales of those lands in the 16th range and points west, and a land district at Marietta for sales of lands in the 15th range and points east. The Act of March 3, 1803 established a new land district at Zanesville for the lands in the 15th and eastward ranges. Sales were also conducted from the nation's capital at the United States General Land Office. Local offices were eventually closed. The State of Ohio also eventually sold lands granted to them by the federal government, such as section 16 of each township, and the Salt Reservations.

== Modern times ==
The survey in Ohio in modern times includes more than 3,500,000 acres (14,000 km^{2}) in all or parts of these counties: Fairfield, Franklin, Gallia, Guernsey, Hocking, Jackson, Lawrence, Morgan, Muskingum, Noble, Perry, Pickaway, Pike, Ross, Scioto, Vinton, and Washington.

== See also ==
- Ohio Lands
- Congress Lands
- Historic regions of the United States
