= Jared Mansfield =

American surveyor (1759–1830)

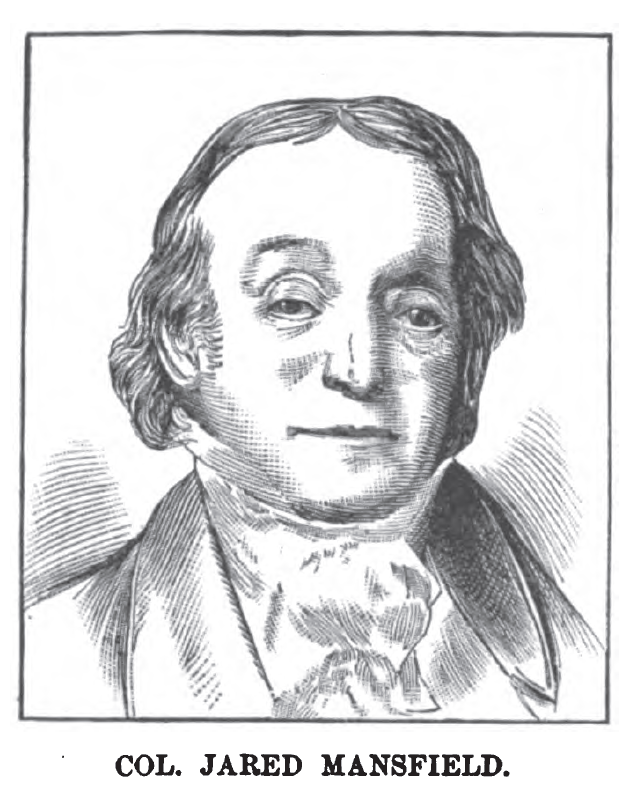
- Sketch by Henry Howe

2nd Surveyor General of the Northwest Territory
- In office November 3, 1803 – November 24, 1812
- Preceded by: Rufus Putnam
- Succeeded by: Josiah Meigs

Personal details
- Born: May 23, 1759 New Haven, Connecticut
- Died: February 3, 1830 (aged 70) New Haven Connecticut
- Spouse: Elizabeth Phipps
- Education: Yale University

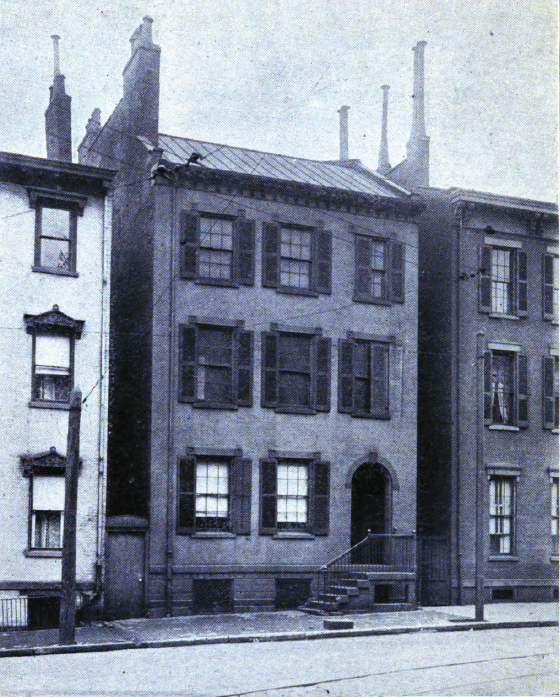
1902 photo of Mansfield's Cincinnati home

Jared Mansfield (May 23, 1759 – February 3, 1830) was an American teacher, mathematician and surveyor. His career was shaped by two interventions by President Thomas Jefferson. In 1801 Jefferson appointed Mansfield as professor at the newly founded United States Military Academy at West Point. Again at Jefferson's appointment, Mansfield served as the Surveyor General of the United States from 1803 to 1812, charged with extending the survey of United States land in the Northwest Territory.

== Early life ==
Mansfield was born in New Haven, Connecticut, son of a sea captain, Stephen Mansfield of New Haven and Hannah Beach of Wallingford, Connecticut. He entered Yale in 1773, but his father died suddenly near the end of his freshman year. He fell into "bad company" and was expelled from college in January of his senior year for complicity in a theft of books from the Library and "other discreditable escapades". Little is known of his life in New Haven for the next nine years, but he is said to have fought the British in the invasion of New Haven of July 5, 1779, and been taken prisoner but quickly released.

Apparently reforming, he may have taught in New Haven, perhaps at the Episcopal Trinity Church on the Green schools where he is listed as a "clerk of the vestry" appointed by Rev. Bela Hubbard from 1786 to 1794, and as a vestryman from 1790 to 1794. In 1786, he became the rector of the Hopkins Grammar School in New Haven, where he remained save for a brief period teaching in Philadelphia, until 1802. Forgiven by Yale, in 1787 he was awarded the degree of Master of Arts and enrolled as graduating with his class of 1777.

In 1800 he married Elizabeth Phipps of New Haven, daughter of an American naval officer.

== Promotion by Jefferson ==
In 1801 he had printed some scientific papers titled Essays Mathematical and Physical, which were brought to Jefferson's attention by Senator Abraham Baldwin. Jefferson appointed Mansfield captain of engineers, so he might become a professor at West Point. After moving to West Point, Mansfield was appointed Surveyor General in Summer of 1803. Jefferson was dissatisfied with the performance of Rufus Putnam, whose surveys in the Congress Lands of Ohio were poorly executed. Putnam was also a Federalist. In 1801, the position had been offered to Andrew Ellicott by Jefferson, but he refused, because he was upset at slow pay for work he had done for the Federal Government. Mansfield's Essays included sections on determining longitude and latitude, which would be useful in improving precision in surveying. Jefferson made a recess appointment, which was confirmed by the Senate November 15, 1803. He was told to "survey Ohio and lands north of the Ohio River", with later extensions to Indiana Territory and Illinois Territory.

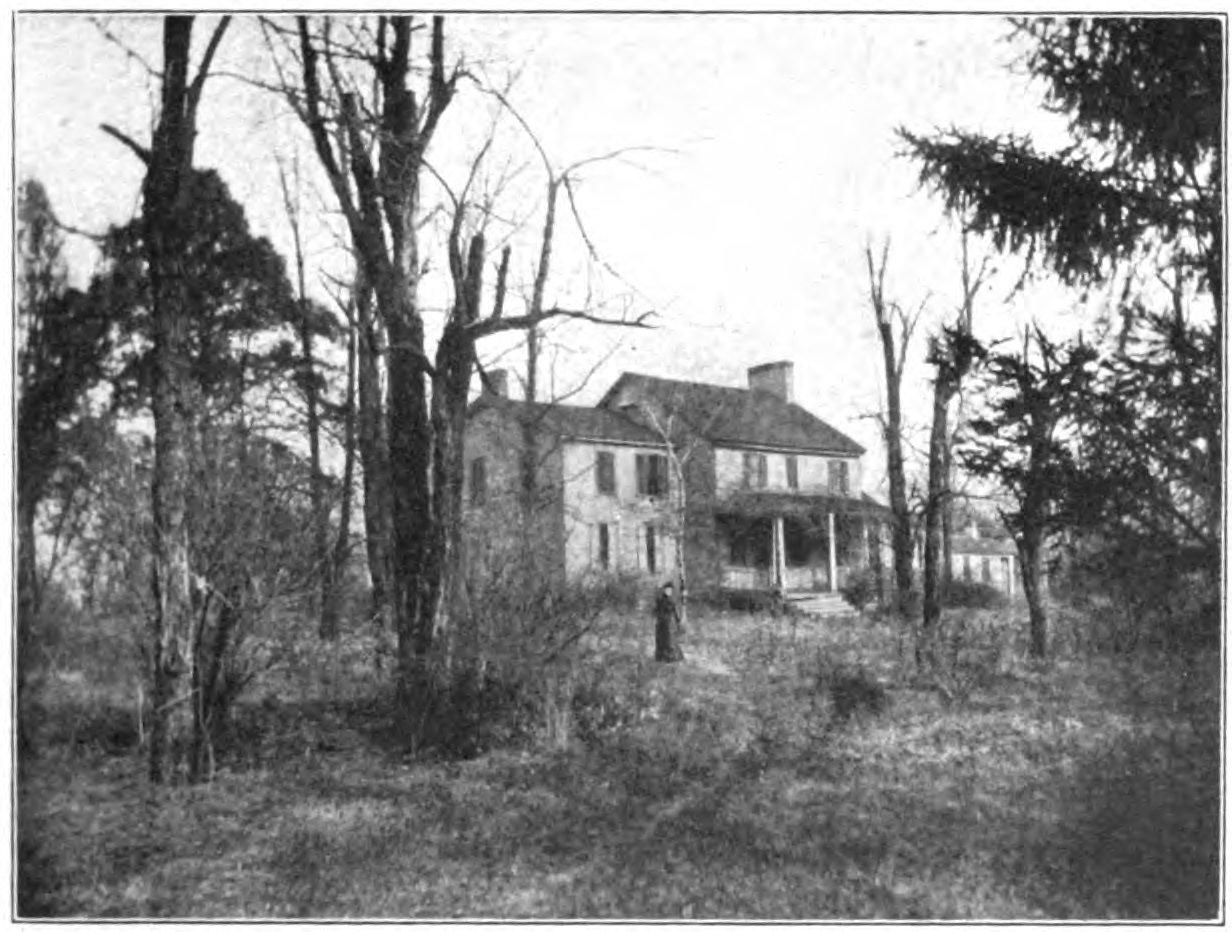
Mansfield's Ludlow Station home, demolished 1891

Mansfield and his family moved to Marietta, Ohio (1803–1805), Ludlow Station (1805–1809) and near Cincinnati (1809–1812). Under Mansfield's direction the survey was continued down the Ohio River, with grids laid out northward from the river, thus dividing the territory into rectangular townships. Mansfield is credited with "considerable scientific ability and high standards of workmanship." He laid out baselines and Meridians astronomically, adapting principles of celestial navigation to surveying, which Ellicott and others had used to extend the Mason–Dixon line decades earlier. Among his deputies were Thomas Worthington, Lewis Cass, and Ethan Allen Brown.

In 1816, Mansfield was elected a member of the American Philosophical Society in Philadelphia.

Jonathan Williams, Superintendent of the U.S. Military Academy sent Mansfield a letter March 20, 1809, "...your rank in the Corps doubtless settled, and I wish you were here to take direction of the Academy." The War of 1812 in the West made surveying difficult. Mansfield returned to West Point in 1814 as professor of mathematics and natural and experimental philosophy, continuing in this position until his retirement in 1828. He never was to direct the academy. He and his wife moved back to Cincinnati, and he died February 3, 1830, while visiting New Haven.

He arranged for Thomas Jefferson to sit at Monticello for the painter Thomas Sully, and the resulting full-length portrait now hangs in the USMA Museum.

The city of Mansfield, Ohio, is named for Jared Mansfield.

He was father of author Edward Deering Mansfield.

== Notes ==
Political offices
Preceded by Rufus Putnam	Surveyor General of the Northwest Territory; 1803–1813	Succeeded by Josiah Meigs
