= Public Land Survey System =

System of dividing land in the United States

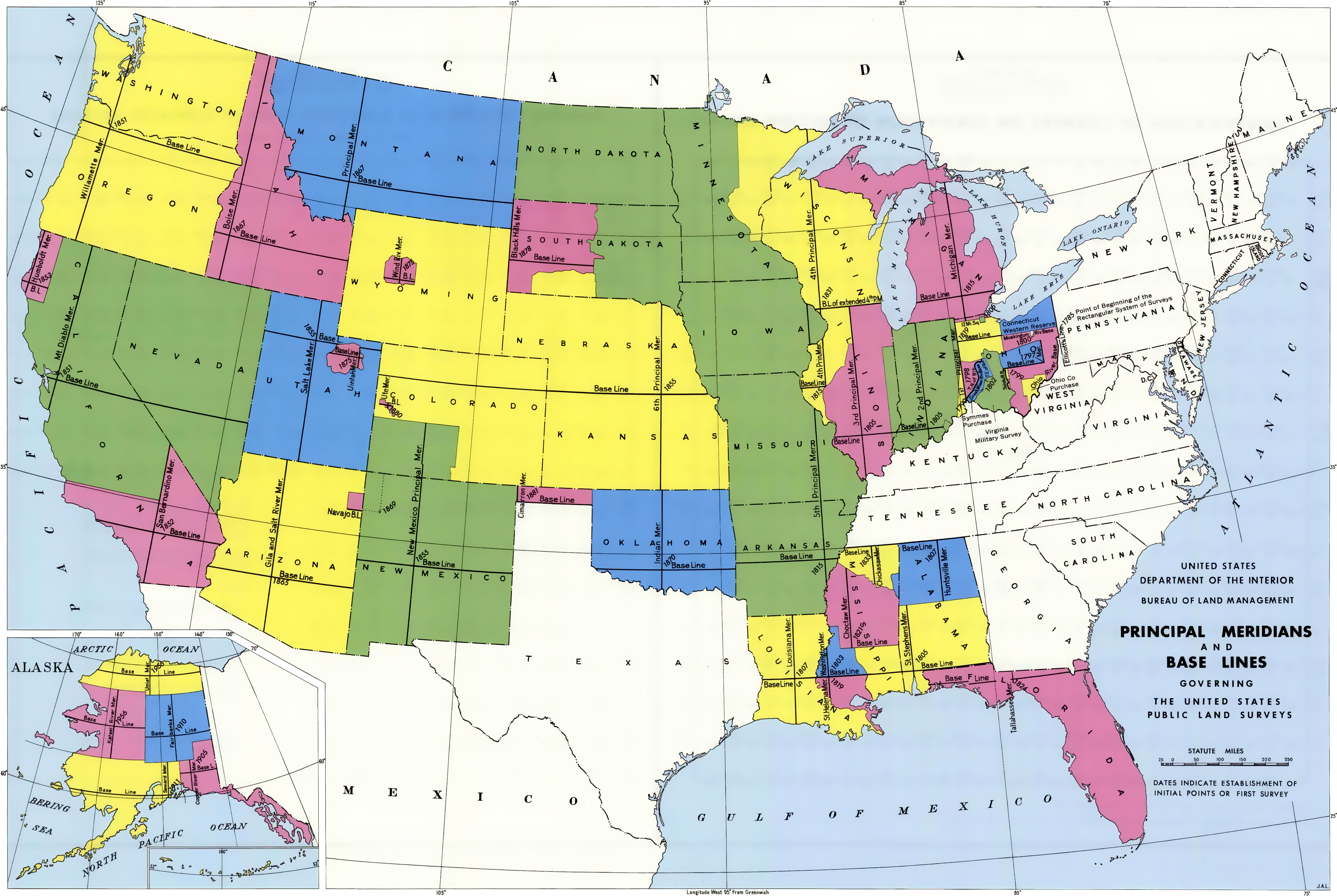
This 1988 BLM map depicts the principal meridians and baselines used for surveying states (colored) in the Public Land Survey System.

The Public Land Survey System (PLSS) is the surveying method developed and used in the United States to plat, or divide, real property for sale and settling. Also known as the Rectangular Survey System, it was created by the Land Ordinance of 1785 to survey land ceded to the United States by the Treaty of Paris in 1783, following the end of the American Revolution. Beginning with the Seven Ranges in present-day Ohio, the PLSS has been used as the primary survey method in the United States. Following the passage of the Northwest Ordinance in 1787, the Surveyor General of the Northwest Territory platted lands in the Northwest Territory. The Surveyor General was later merged with the United States General Land Office, which later became a part of the U.S. Bureau of Land Management (BLM). Today, the BLM controls the survey, sale, and settling of lands acquired by the United States.

== History ==
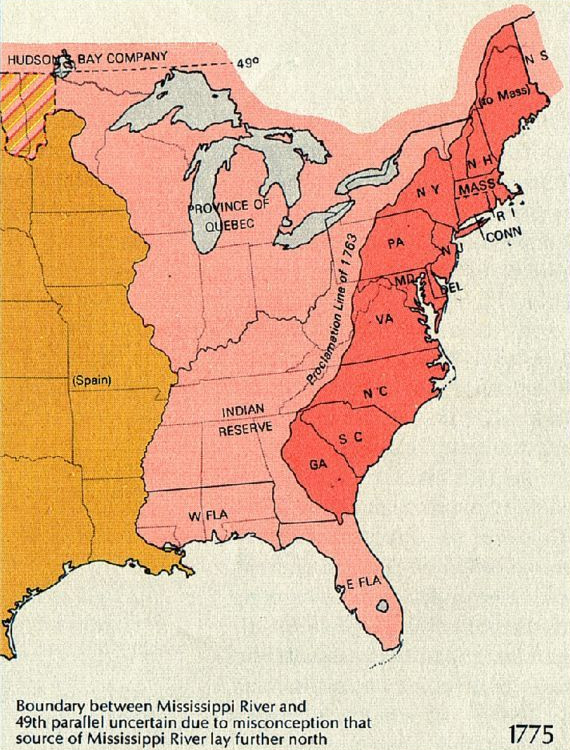
Map of territorial growth, 1775

Northwest territory

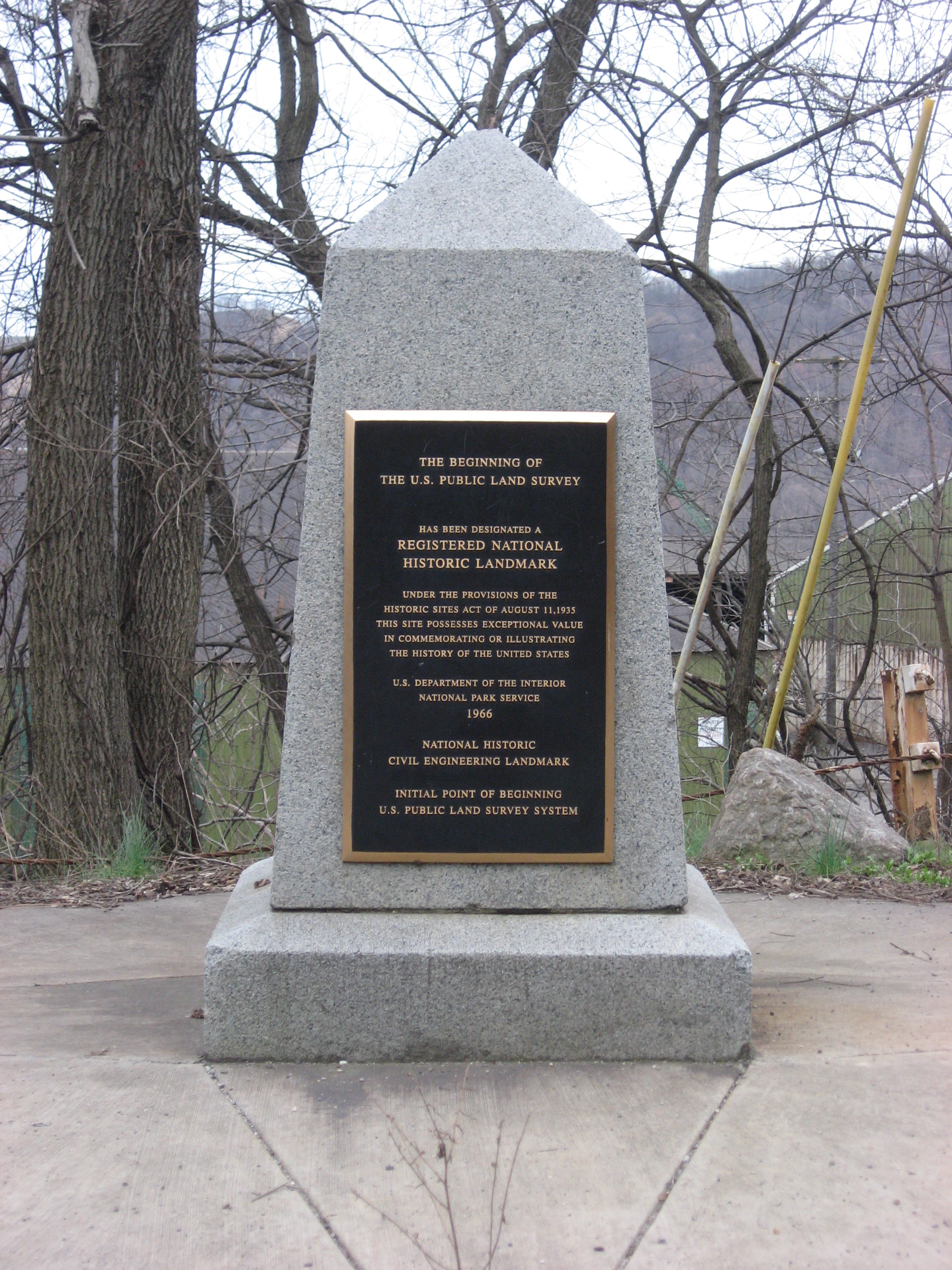
Monument referencing the beginning point of the PLSS

Originally proposed by Thomas Jefferson to create a nation of "yeoman farmers", the PLSS began shortly after the American Revolutionary War, when the federal government became responsible for large areas of land west of the original thirteen states. The government wished both to distribute land to Revolutionary War soldiers in reward for their services and to sell land as a way of raising money for the nation. Before this could happen, the land needed to be surveyed.

The Land Ordinance of 1785 marks the beginning of the Public Land Survey System. The Confederation Congress was deeply in debt following the Declaration of Independence. With little power to tax, the federal government decided to use the sale of the Western Territories to pay off war debt. The PLSS has been expanded and slightly modified by Letters of Instruction and Manuals of Instruction, issued by the General Land Office and the Bureau of Land Management, and is still in use in most of the states west of Pennsylvania, south to Florida, Alabama, and Mississippi, west to the Pacific Ocean, and north into the Arctic in Alaska.

=== Origins ===
The original colonies (including their derivatives Maine, Vermont, Tennessee, Kentucky and West Virginia) continued the British system of metes and bounds. This system describes property lines based on local markers and bounds drawn by humans, often based on topography. A typical, yet simple, description under this system might read "From the point on the north bank of Muddy Creek one mile above the junction of Muddy and Indian Creeks, north for 400 yards, then northwest to the large standing rock, west to the large oak tree, south to Muddy Creek, then down the center of the creek to the starting point."

Particularly in New England, this system was supplemented by drawing town plats. The metes and bounds system was used to describe a town of a generally rectangular shape, 4 to 6 miles (6.4 to 9.7 km) on a side. Within this boundary, a map or plat was maintained that showed all the individual lots or properties.

There are some difficulties with this system:

- Irregular shapes for properties make for much more complex descriptions.
- Over time, these descriptions become problematic as trees die or streams move by erosion.
- It was not useful for the large, newly surveyed tracts of land being opened in the west, which were being sold sight unseen to investors.

In the 1783 Treaty of Paris recognizing the United States, Britain also recognized American rights to the land south of the Great Lakes and west to the Mississippi River. The Continental Congress passed the Land Ordinance of 1785 and then the Northwest Ordinance in 1787 to control the survey, sale, and settling of the new lands. The original 13 colonies donated their western lands to the new union, for the purpose of giving land for new states. These include the lands that formed the Northwest Territory, Kentucky, Tennessee, Alabama, and Mississippi. The state that gave up the most was Virginia, whose original claim included most of the Northwest Territory and Kentucky. Some of the western land was claimed by more than one state, especially in the northwest, where parts were claimed by Virginia, Pennsylvania, and Connecticut, all three of which had claimed lands all the way to the Pacific Ocean.

=== Application ===
The first surveys under the new rectangular system were in eastern Ohio in an area called the Seven Ranges. The Beginning Point of the U.S. Public Land Survey is at a point on the Ohio-Pennsylvania border between East Liverpool, Ohio, and Ohioville, Pennsylvania, on private property. A National Historic Landmark marker commemorating the site lies on the side of a state highway, exactly 1,112 feet (339 m) to the north of the point.

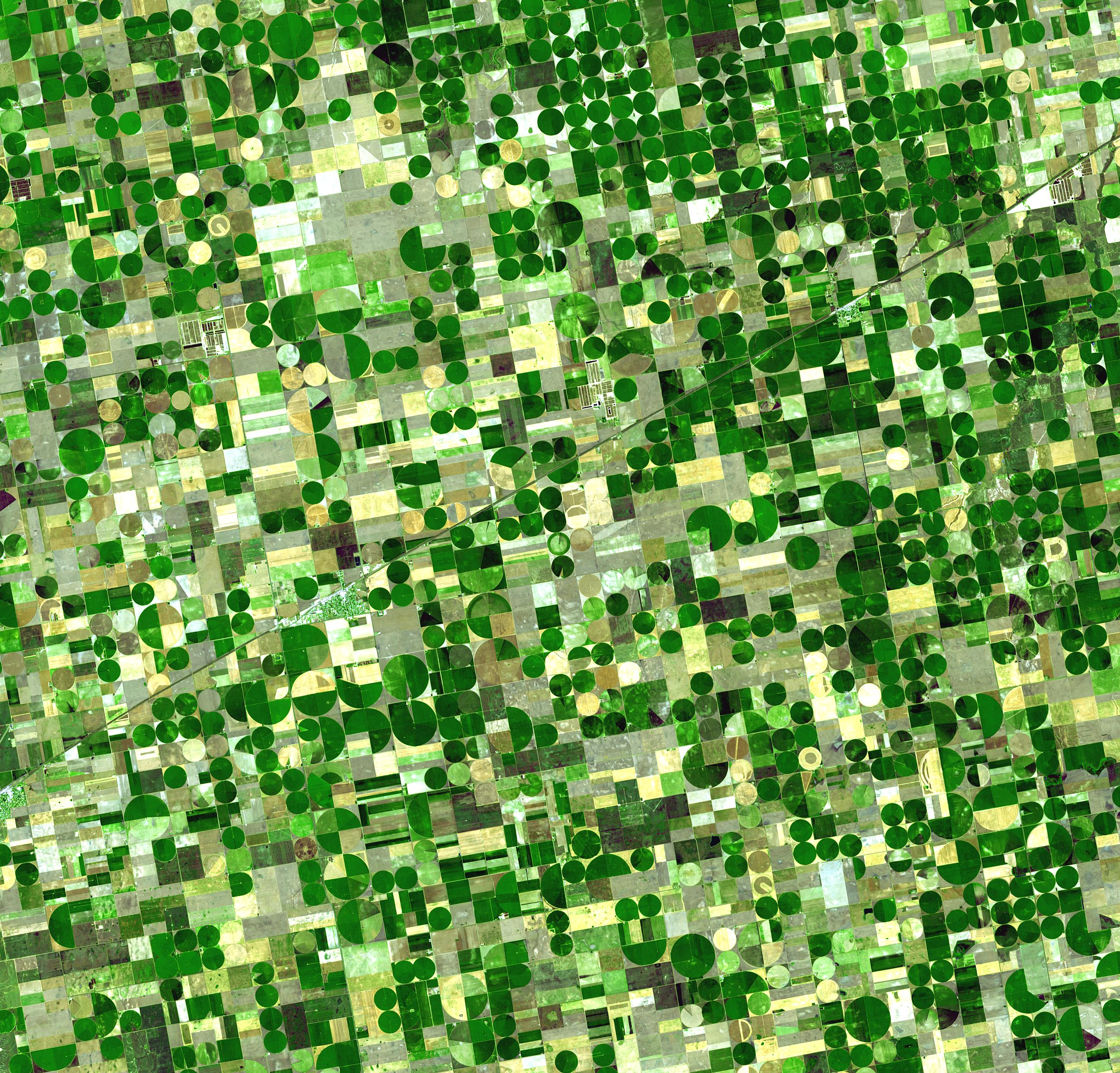
Farmland in Kansas divided into quarter sections

Ohio was surveyed in several major subdivisions, collectively described as the Ohio Lands, each with its own meridian and baseline. The early surveying, particularly in Ohio, was performed with more speed than care, with the result that many of the oldest townships and sections vary considerably from their prescribed shape and area. Proceeding westward, accuracy became more of a consideration than rapid sale, and the system was simplified by establishing one major north–south line (principal meridian) and one east–west (base) line that control descriptions for an entire state or more. For example, a single Willamette Meridian serves both Oregon and Washington. County lines frequently follow the survey, so there are many rectangular counties in the Midwest and the West.

== Non-PLSS regions ==
1860 survey of Louisiana showing "Davenport Claims" and "Rejected Claim of the Baron de Bastrop", among others

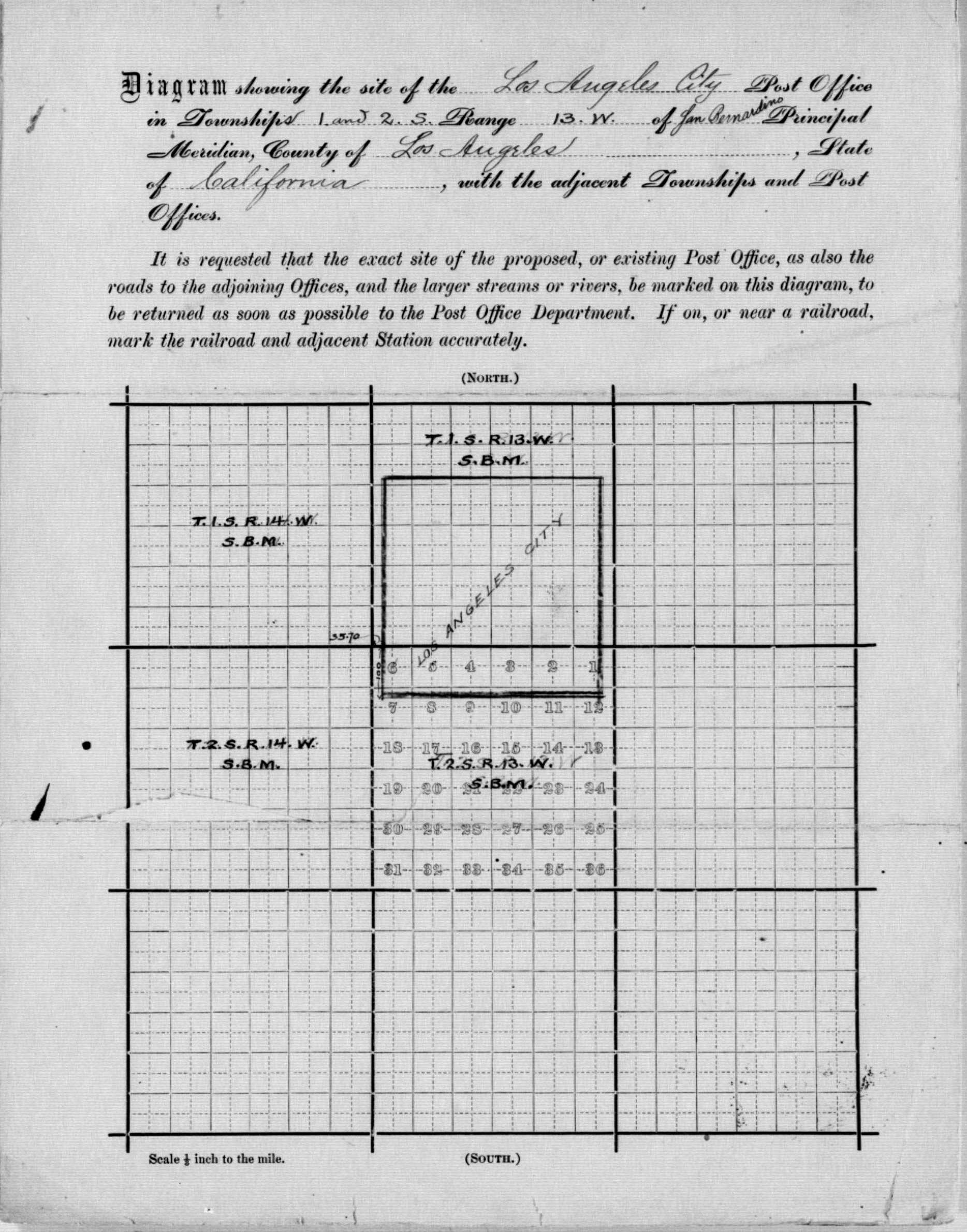
This post office application from 1866 shows the four square Spanish leagues of the pre-statehood Los Angeles Pueblo within the township-range system.

The system is in use in some capacity in most of the country, but large portions use other systems. The territory under the jurisdiction of the Thirteen Colonies at the time of independence did not adopt the PLSS, with the exception of the area that became the Northwest Territory and some of the southern states. This territory comprises Georgia, Connecticut, Delaware, Kentucky, Maine, Maryland, Massachusetts, New Hampshire, New Jersey, New York, North Carolina, Pennsylvania, Rhode Island, South Carolina, Tennessee, Vermont, Virginia, and West Virginia. The old Cherokee lands in Georgia use the term section as a land designation, but it does not define the same area as the section used by the PLSS. Maine uses a variant of the system in unsettled parts of the state. Parts of Texas, western New York, northwest Pennsylvania, western Georgia, western Kentucky, middle and western Tennessee, and northern Maine use state-developed survey systems similar to PLSS.

Other major exceptions to PLSS are:

- California, before statehood in 1850, was only crudely surveyed with the boundaries of Spanish and Mexican land grants (ranchos); since statehood the PLSS was used to convey government lands.
- Georgia surveyed its remaining central and western lands into a grid of land lots. Most were surveyed from 1819 through 1821 immediately upon the cession of all former Spanish lands to the U.S.
- Hawaii adopted a system based on the Kingdom of Hawaii native system in place at the time of annexation.
- Louisiana recognizes early French and Spanish descriptions called arpents, particularly in the southern part of the state, as well as PLSS descriptions.
- Alabama recognizes Spanish-era land claims, especially near the coast.
- New Mexico uses the PLSS but has several areas that retain original metes and bounds from Spanish and Mexican rule. These take the form of land grants similar to areas of Texas and California. As an extension, there are some New Mexico based Mexican land grants in south central Colorado.
- Ohio's Virginia Military District was surveyed using the metes and bounds system. Areas in northern Ohio (the Connecticut Western Reserve and United States Military District) were surveyed with another standard, sometimes referred to as Congressional Survey townships, which are five miles (8 km) on each side instead of the six miles standard implemented by the PLSS.
- Texas has a hybrid of its own early system, based on land grants made in Spanish Texas, and a variation of the PLSS.
- Wisconsin had French settlement prior to the PLSS in the areas of Green Bay and Prairie du Chien. Both areas were initially divided using the French Long Lot system along the water frontage. The most noticeable artifact of this system is visible on maps and satellite images in that the general street grids of Green Bay, Allouez, Ashwaubenon and De Pere are all aligned to the Fox River, being rotated about 25° from north, in contrast to the standard east-west grid of the surrounding townships in Brown County.
- Michigan had French settlement prior to the PLSS along the Detroit and St. Clair rivers, and near Sault Ste. Marie, Marquette, and Ypsilanti. These are all examples of the French long lots.
- Parts of Washington, Oregon, Idaho and Wyoming were settled as Donation Land Claims. Some were established before the Willamette Meridian, and those established after were often poorly surveyed and did not correspond to the PLSS.

== Survey design and execution ==
Illustration of the system from the National Atlas

=== Commonly used terms ===
- Aliquot part: A terse, hierarchical reference to a piece of land, in which successive subdivisions of some larger area are appended to the beginning of the reference. For example, SW1/4 NW1/4 S13, T1SR20E refers to the southwest quarter of the northwest quarter of section 13 of Township 1 South Range 20 East (a 40-acre parcel). See further discussion below.
- Base Line: A parallel of latitude, referenced to and established from a designated initial point, upon which all rectangular surveys in a defined area are based. Also spelled baseline.
- BLM: Bureau of Land Management, the successor agency to the General Land Office
- Cadastral: Having to do with the boundaries of land parcels.
- Corner: The point of intersection of any two actual or potential survey lines, defining one corner of a rectangular land parcel.
- Lot: A subdivision of a section which is not an aliquot part of the section but which is designated separately. A lot is typically irregular in shape, and its acreage varies from that of regular aliquot parts.
- Initial point: The starting point for a survey; the intersection point of the Principal meridian and the Base line in a given region.
- Land grant: Historically a land grant is an area of land to which title was conferred by a predecessor government, usually English/British, Spanish or Mexican, and confirmed by the U.S federal courts after the territory was acquired by the United States.
- Monumentation: Placement and/or marking of physical objects on the ground to mark survey points and lines.
- Original survey: The first official government survey in a given area. Unless fraud is proven, the original survey is legally valid and binding, regardless of any surveying errors that may have occurred. All subsequent subdivision, sale, etc. must proceed from the original survey. In the United States, most original surveys were done under contract with the General Land Office.
- Principal meridian (PM): A true meridian running through an initial point, which together with the baseline form the highest level framework for all rectangular surveys in a given area. The list of all principal meridians is given below.
- Public domain (land): Land owned and managed by the Federal government. Synonymous with public lands. National Parks and National Forests are a large part of the public domain land today. The original public domain included the lands that were turned over to the Federal Government by the original thirteen states and areas acquired from the native Indian tribes or foreign powers.
- Range (Rng, R): A measure of the distance east or west from a referenced principal meridian, in units of six miles.
- Section: An approximately one-square-mile block of land. There are 36 sections in a survey township.
- Township (Twp, T): A square parcel of land of 36 square miles, or a measure of the distance north or south from a referenced baseline, in units of six miles.
- Witness: Any marker set on the ground that marks or represents some other nearby object or location of surveying importance, such as a corner. For example, a bearing tree is a witness to a survey corner.

=== Design ===
The surveying of any regional area, such as a state or multiple states, is a multi-step process. First, two controlling survey lines are established: a baseline which runs east–west and a principal meridian which runs north–south. The locations of the two are determined by a previously chosen initial point, where they originate and thus intersect. Next, at a defined distance interval, commonly 24 or 30 miles (48 km) depending on the year and location, standard parallels of latitude are established parallel to the baseline. The meridian, baseline and standard parallels thus established form a lattice upon which all further surveying is then based. Subsequent work divides the land into survey townships of roughly 36 square miles (93 km^{2}) or 6 miles (9.7 km) on each side. This is done by the establishment of township and range lines. Township lines run parallel to the baseline (east-west), while range lines run north–south; each are established at 6-mile intervals. Lastly, townships are subdivided into 36 sections of approximately 1 square mile (640 acres; 2.6 km^{2}) and sections into four quarter-sections of 0.25 square miles (160 acres; 0.65 km^{2}) each. The intersection of a township line (or baseline) with a range line (or principal meridian) constitutes a township corner, of a section line with any other type of line a section corner, and a point halfway between any two section corners a quarter corner. The federal government typically surveyed only to this quarter-section level, the subdivision of smaller parcels being carried out subsequently by private surveyors after original sale.

Because the survey design is two-dimensional (rectangular), while the actual Earth is three-dimensional (approximately spherical and topographically), adjustments to land areas must be made periodically to prevent error propagation; not all sections can be one square mile nor can all townships be exactly 36 square miles. More specifically, all north–south running lines (all range lines and half of all section lines), as with the prime meridian, are always established with reference to true, geodetic north. But it is a physical impossibility to meet this condition and still maintain a rectangular land grid, because such lines converge on the north pole.

These adjustments are done at two different scales. At the small scale (within a township) it is done by starting the sectional surveys (township "subdivisions") in the southeast corner and moving progressively toward the northwest corner. The algorithm used is to move northward to establish the six easternmost sections (and quarter-sections), then move west at one mile intervals, parallel to the eastern boundary of the township, repeating this process, until the western side of the township is reached. The result of this is that the northernmost and westernmost tiers of sections—11 in all—are thus allowed to deviate from one square mile, but the other (southeasterly-most) 25 sections are not. This method accommodates the curvature problem within a township and also allows for any errors made during the surveying—which were nearly unavoidable because of the physical difficulty of the work and the crude equipment used—without overly compromising the basic rectangular nature of the system as a whole. At the larger multiple township scale, the standard parallels developed at the establishment of the baseline, so that townships widths do not continually decrease as the grid proceeds north (and is in fact the primary reason for their establishment). Thus, corrections for curvature of the Earth exist at two separate spatial scales—a smaller scale within townships and a larger scale between multiple townships and within standard parallels.

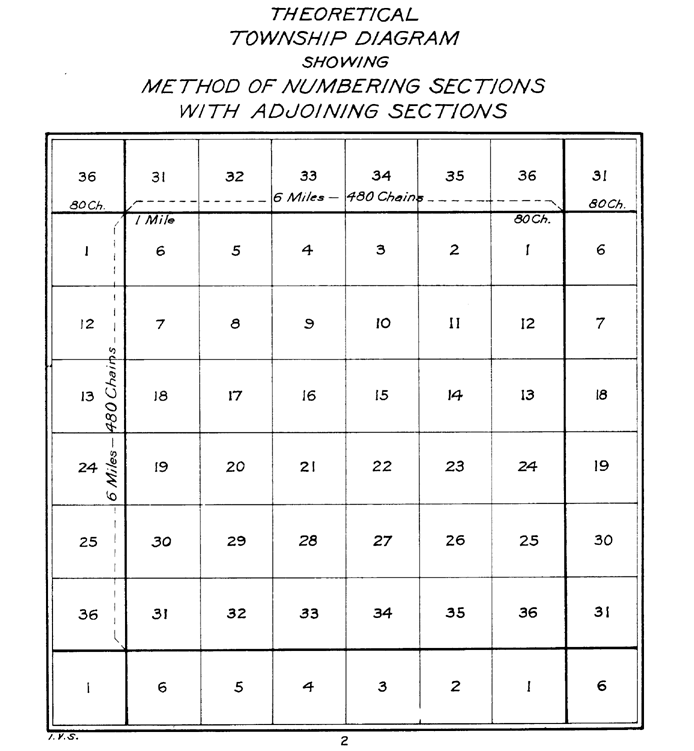
Figure 2. This United States General Land Office diagram shows the theoretical sectioning of a standard survey township.

A specific and terse location descriptor is always used, in which the townships and sections are indexed based on (1) the township's position relative to the initial point, (2) the section's location within the designated township, and (3) the principal meridian reference. Township, range, and section are abbreviated as T, R, and S, respectively, and cardinal bearings from the initial point by N, S, E, and W; each principal meridian also has its established abbreviation. Thus, for example, the description "T1SR20E S13 MDM" reads as follows: Township 1 South, Range 20 East, Section 13, Mount Diablo Meridian. That is, the 13th section in the first township south of the baseline (in this case, the Mount Diablo Baseline) and the 20th township east of the principal meridian (the Mount Diablo Meridian). Since township and range lines are six miles apart, the "T1SR20E" part of the designation instantly places the location somewhere between zero and six miles south of the baseline, and 114 and 120 miles east of the principal meridian. Knowing how sections are numbered within townships, section 13 is identified as therefore occupying the one square mile located 2 to 3 miles south, and 119 to 120 miles east, of the Mount Diablo initial point (in central California). Note that the sections within a township are numbered in an unconventional, Boustrophedon pattern (Fig. 2), in which alternating rows are numbered in opposite directions, starting from section 1 in the northeast corner and ending with section 36 in the southeast corner, as per Figure 2. Therefore, section 13 is adjacent to the eastern range line of the designated township. Numbering in this pattern ensures that numerically sequential sections within the same township are physically adjacent and share colinear boundaries.

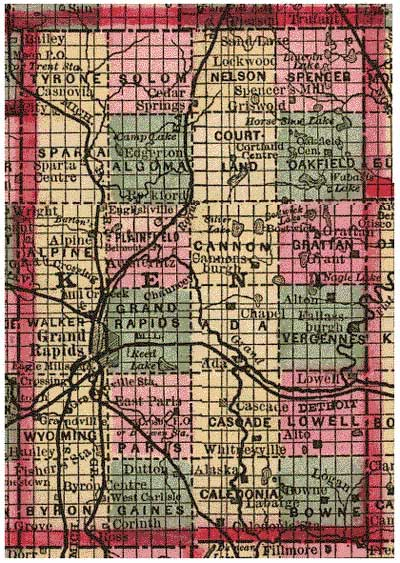
Figure 3. Kent County, Michigan in 1885 as a PLSS example, showing 24 named townships and sectional subdivisions.

=== Measurement ===
Distances were always measured in chains and links, based on Edmund Gunter's 66-foot measuring chain. The chain – an actual metal chain – was made up of 100 links, each being 7.92 inches (201 mm) long. Eighty chains constitute one U.S. survey mile (which differs from the international mile by a few millimeters). There were two chainmen, one at each end, who physically made the measurements, one of them typically also acting as "compassman" to establish the correct bearing at each chain placement. In forested areas, it was essential for rapid progress and accuracy that the lead chainman follow the correct bearing at all times, since no straightening of the chain was possible without backtracking around trees and re-measuring. It was also necessary to keep the chain level, since all surveying distances are based on the horizontal, not slope, distance. In steep terrain, this meant shortening the chain, raising one end of the chain relative to the other, or both. In areas where measuring by chain was not possible, such as extremely steep terrain or water obstructions, distances were calculated by triangulation.

=== Monumentation ===
Monumentation is the establishment of permanent on-the-ground objects that mark exact locations of surveyed points and lines. They are the legally binding markers used for setting property lines and as such are the culminating work of any survey. They consist of both corner monuments as well as nearby accessory objects that "witness" to them. Witness objects allow subsequent surveyors and landowners to find the original corner monument location should the monument be destroyed. It was not uncommon for squatters or homesteaders to destroy corner monuments if they felt the patenting of the land would threaten their residence on it. For this reason, destruction of corner monuments, or their accompanying witness objects was, and still is, a federal offense.

At corners, corner monuments are established to mark their exact location on the ground. As with most PLSS specifications, those for corner monumentation also changed over time. In the 19th century, monuments were commonly a rock pile, a wooden post, or a combination of the two. Trees could be used if the corner happened to fall at the exact spot where one grew. In the 20th century, steel pipes with caps, supported by mounds of rock, became required (for example, see Fig. 4). Witnesses can be trees, rocks, or trenches dug in the ground; their exact locations relative to the corner, and the markings made on them, are also recorded in the surveyor's official fieldnotes. Witness trees at corners are more commonly referred to as bearing trees because the exact distance and bearing from the corner, to them, was required to be recorded (as well as the taxon and diameter).

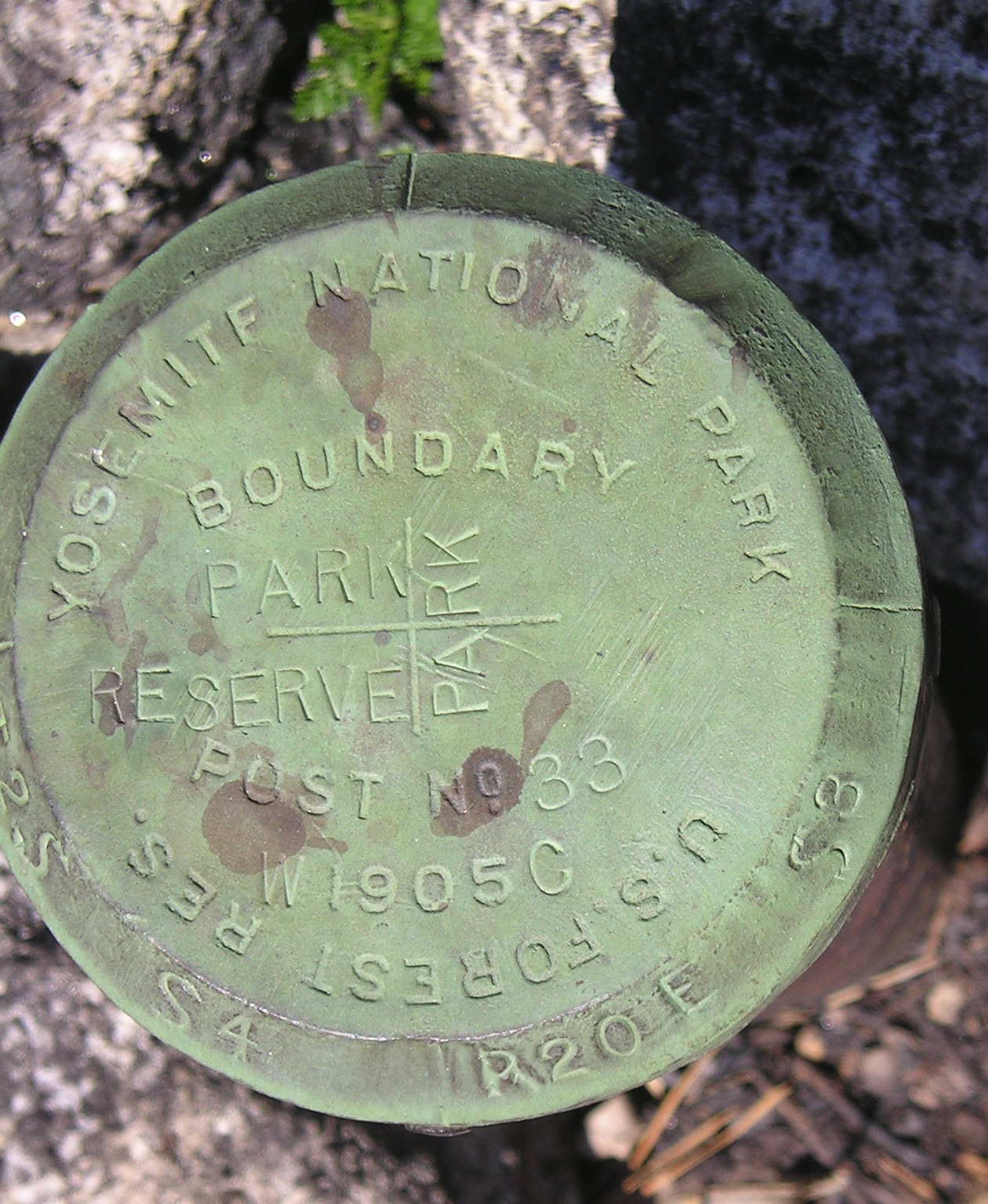
Figure 4. The cast and stamped cap on a corner monument pipe, in western Yosemite National Park, placed in 1905 during the Park boundary resurvey.

On each bearing tree, two blazes were typically required, one about chest height and easily visible, and one at ground level (in case the tree were illegally cut, the stump remaining). On the exposed wood of the blaze, surveyors were required to inscribe, with wood chisels, township, range and section information, on typically either two or four bearing trees, if they were within some reasonable distance of the corner (unspecified early on but later set at a maximum of 3 chains (178 feet, 60 meters) away). Bearing trees are of vital importance not just for these land boundary purposes but also for their use by ecologists in the estimation of historic forest vegetation conditions before settlement and large scale human disturbance of the land. The data provided in these surveys provide a definitive estimate of original forest composition and structure, and the data have accordingly been used heavily.

Along survey lines, monumentation was much less elaborate, consisting primarily of only the blazing and some simple scribing of trees directly on, or very close to, the survey line. The purpose was to help retrace a surveyed line should that become necessary. It was also additional proof that the line had in fact been run correctly, especially in those cases where the blazed line tree's pertinent information (species, diameter and distance from previous corner) was recorded in the fieldnotes, as was often required.

=== Information to be recorded ===
Records kept by the surveyors during the execution of the work varied over time. Furthermore, how well individual surveying parties actually met the requirements or recommendations at the time, also varied. The following is a list of the more commonly required landscape and surveying items that were either required or requested be noted, over much of the nineteenth century.

- The precise length of every line run, noting all necessary offsets therefrom, with the reason and mode thereof.
- The species and diameter of all "bearing trees", with the course and distance of the same from their respective corners; and the precise relative position of witness corners to the true corners.
- The kinds of materials (earth or stone) of which mounds are constructed—the fact of their being conditioned according to instructions—with the course and distance of the "pits", from the centre of the mound, where necessity exists for deviating from the general rule.
- The name, diameter, and distance on line to all trees which the line intersects.
- The distance at which the line first intersects and then leaves every settler's claim and improvement; prairie; river, creek, or other "bottom"; or swamp, marsh, grove, and wind fall, with the course of the same at both points of intersection; also the distances of ascents, summits, and descents of all remarkable hills and ridges, with their courses and estimated height, in feet, above the level land of the surrounding country, or above the bottom lands, ravines, or waters near which they are situated.
- All streams of water which the line crosses; the distance on line at the points of intersection and their widths on line. In cases of navigable streams, their width will be ascertained between the meander corners, as set forth under the proper head.
- The land's surface, whether level, rolling, broken, or hilly.
- The soil, whether first, second, or third rate.
- The several kinds of timber and undergrowth, in the order in which they predominate.
- Bottom lands were to be described as wet or dry, and if subject to inundation, state to what depth.
- Springs of water, whether fresh, saline, or mineral, and the course of the stream flowing from them.
- Lakes and ponds, describing their banks and giving their height, and also the depth of water and whether it be pure or stagnant.
- Towns and villages; Indian towns and wigwams; houses or cabins; fields, or other improvements; sugar tree groves, sugar camps, mill seats, forges, and factories.
- Coal banks or beds; peat or turf grounds; minerals and ores; with particular description as to quality and extent, and all diggings therefore; also salt springs and licks. All reliable information that could be obtained respecting these objects, whether they be on the immediate line or not, was to appear in the general description at the end of the notes.
- Roads and trails, with their directions, whence and whither.
- Rapids, cataracts, cascades, or falls of water, with the height of their fall in feet.
- Precipices, caves, sink-holes, ravines, stone quarries, ledges of rocks, with the kind of stone they afford.
- Natural curiosities, interesting fossils, petrifactions, organic remains; ancient works of art, such as mounds, fortifications, embankments, ditches, or objects of like nature.
- The variation of the needle must be noted at all points or places on the lines where there is found any material change of variation, and the position of such points must be perfectly identified in the notes.

=== Distance and area conversions ===
	Dimensions (miles)	(mi^{2})	Area (acres)	(m^{2})	(km^{2})	Notes
Quadrangle/check	24 by 24	576	368,640		1,490	Usually 16 townships
Township	6 by 6	36	23,040		93.2	Usually 36 sections
Section	1 by 1	1	640		2.59
Half-section	1 by 1/2	1/2	320	1,290,000	1.29
Quarter-section	1/2 by 1/2	1/4	160	647,000
Half of quarter-section	1/2 by 1/4	1/8	80	324,000
Quarter of quarter-section	1/4 by 1/4	1/16	40	162,000

== List of meridians ==
Name	Adopted	Initial point	State(s)
Black Hills Meridian	1878	43°59′44″N 104°03′16″W	South Dakota
Boise Meridian	1867	43°22′21″N 116°23′35″W	Idaho
Chickasaw Meridian	1833	35°01′58″N 89°14′47″W	Mississippi
Choctaw Meridian	1821	31°52′32″N 90°14′41″W	Mississippi
Cimarron Meridian	1881	36°30′05″N 103°00′07″W	Oklahoma
Copper River Meridian	1905	61°49′04″N 145°18′37″W	Alaska
Fairbanks Meridian	1910	64°51′50.048″N 147°38′25.94″W	Alaska
Fifth Principal Meridian	1815	34°38′45″N 91°03′07″W	Arkansas, Iowa, Minnesota, Missouri, North Dakota & South Dakota
First Principal Meridian	1819	40°59′22″N 84°48′11″W	Ohio & Indiana
Fourth Principal Meridian	1815	40°00′50″N 90°27′11″W	Illinois
Fourth Principal Extended Meridian	1831	42°30′27″N 90°25′37″W	Minnesota & Wisconsin
Gila and Salt River Meridian	1865	33°22′38″N 112°18′19″W	Arizona
Humboldt Meridian	1853	40°25′02″N 124°07′10″W	California
Huntsville Meridian	1807	34°59′27″N 86°34′16″W	Alabama & Mississippi
Indian Meridian	1870	34°29′32″N 97°14′49″W	Oklahoma
Kateel River Meridian	1956	65°26′16.374″N 158°45′31.01″W	Alaska
Louisiana Meridian	1807	31°00′31″N 92°24′55″W	Louisiana
Michigan Meridian	1815	42°25′28″N 84°21′53″W	Michigan & Ohio
Mount Diablo Meridian	1851	37°52′54″N 121°54′47″W	California & Nevada
Navajo Meridian	1869	35°44′56″N 108°31′59″W	Arizona
New Mexico Principal Meridian	1855	34°15′35″N 106°53′12″W	Colorado & New Mexico
Montana Principal Meridian	1867	45°47′13″N 111°39′33″W	Montana
Salt Lake Meridian	1855	40°46′11″N 111°53′27″W	Utah
San Bernardino Meridian	1852	34°07′13″N 116°55′48″W	California
Second Principal Meridian	1805	38°28′14″N 86°27′21″W	Illinois & Indiana
Seward Meridian	1911	60°07′37″N 149°21′26″W	Alaska
Sixth Principal Meridian	1855	40°00′07″N 97°22′08″W	Colorado, Kansas, Nebraska, South Dakota & Wyoming
Saint Helena Meridian	1819	30°59′56″N 91°09′36″W	Louisiana
Saint Stephens Meridian	1805	30°59′51″N 88°01′20″W	Alabama & Mississippi
Tallahassee Meridian	1824	30°26′03″N 84°16′38″W	Florida & Alabama
Third Principal Meridian	1805	38°28′27″N 89°08′54″W	Illinois
Uintah Meridian	1875	40°25′59″N 109°56′06″W	Utah
Umiat Meridian	1956	69°23′29.654″N 152°00′04.55″W	Alaska
Ute Meridian	1880	39°06′23″N 108°31′59″W	Colorado
Washington Meridian	1803	30°59′56″N 91°09′36″W	Mississippi
Willamette Meridian	1851	45°31′11″N 122°44′34″W	Oregon & Washington
Wind River Meridian	1875	43°00′41″N 108°48′49″W	Wyoming

Based on the BLM manual's 1973 publication date, and the reference to Clarke's Spheroid of 1866 in section 2-82, the coordinates listed are believed to be in the NAD27 datum.

== List of surveys having no initial point ==
Ohio Lands

These public land surveys had no initial point as an origin for both township and range.

- Between the Miamis, north of Symmes Purchase (Ohio)
- Muskingum River Survey (Ohio)
- Ohio River Base (Indiana)
- Ohio River Survey (Ohio)
- Scioto River Base (Ohio)
- Twelve-Mile-Square Reserve (Ohio)
- United States Military Survey (Ohio)
- West of the Great Miami (Ohio)

== Social impact ==
=== Railroad land grants ===
Illustration of railroad land grant layout

The Pacific Railroad Act of 1862 (signed by President Abraham Lincoln) was the first major land grant specifically for the transcontinental railroad. This act provided surveyed, public lands for a railroad right-of-way to build rail systems, and millions of acres to raise the capital needed to build and maintain the future railways.

Ten square miles of land on each side of the proposed rail track were granted for every one mile of completed railway. The PLSS was utilized for measurement. Every one-mile length of railway completed was akin to a section. If the railway ran predominantly east and west, a 10-mile (16 km) range of one square mile sections was allotted on each side of the 400-foot (120 m) right-of-way. If the railway ran predominantly north and south, a 10-mile (16 km) township of one square mile sections was allotted on each side of the 400-foot (120 m) right-of-way. The land was granted in alternating sections (one square mile), with each odd numbered section going to the railroad company and each even numbered section kept by the government. This created a checkerboard pattern along proposed railways. This was supposed to guarantee that railroad access would increase the value of both the railroad-granted sections and the government-owned sections in the checkerboard. The system was devised by Senator Stephen A. Douglas, with political support from Senator Jefferson Davis.

=== Education ===
Under the 1785 act, section 16 of each township was set aside for school purposes and as such was often called the school section. Section 36 was also subsequently added as a school section in western states. The various states and counties ignored, altered or amended this provision in their own ways, but the general (intended) effect was a guarantee that local schools would have an income and that the community schoolhouses would be centrally located for all children. An example of land allotments made specifically for higher education is Ohio's College Township. The first public school in Mississippi, Franklin Academy at Columbus, opened in 1821, was funded by "16th-section funds." One history of a town in Madison County, Alabama recounted, "The sixteenth-section fund for schools was a large one and raised by the sale of the section to Richard Jefferies. The money, by order of the Legislature, was deposited in the branches of the State banks, they paying to the schools 12 1/2 per cent per annum, but from mismanagement the banks broke, and what has become of the money, no one knows. It has gone where the woodbine twineth."

=== Survey fraud ===
There were numerous incidents of fraudulent or bad surveying reported, arguably in nearly every state. The remote nature of the land being surveyed certainly enabled the opportunity for fraud to occur. The most notorious, large scale, and costly fraud was perpetrated by the Benson Syndicate, operating primarily in California in the 1880s.

=== Metric system adoption ===
The PLSS is considered one of the major points of contention in the adoption of the metric system in the United States. The PLSS has used the Gunter's chain as a basic measurement. In Canada, however, where the land survey is based on the same units of measure as the U.S. land survey, the metric system was adopted without issue.

"...the measurements of every plot of ground in the United States have been made in acres, feet, and inches, and are publicly recorded with the titles to the land according to the record system peculiar to this country." —Franklin Institute of Philadelphia (1876). Because of this, redefining property boundaries could create a large amount of legal issues and property owner confusion. Many local zoning laws are defined in feet/square feet. Conversion of units for surveyors are not simple, and complex decisions are frequently required (such as non-universal conversion factors, soft/hard conversions, number rounding).

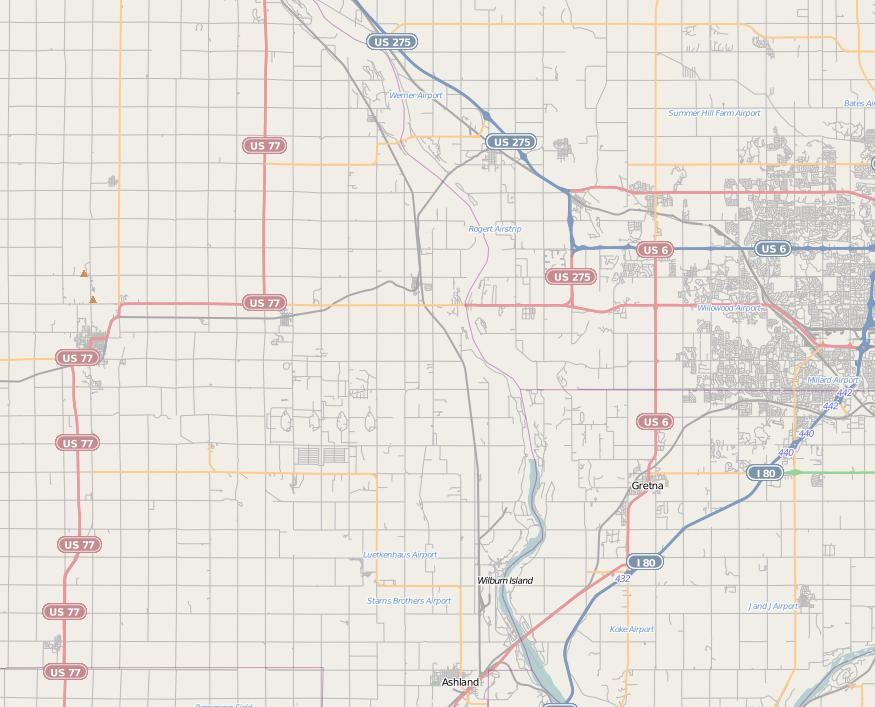
Example of road system in a PLSS area; Nebraska

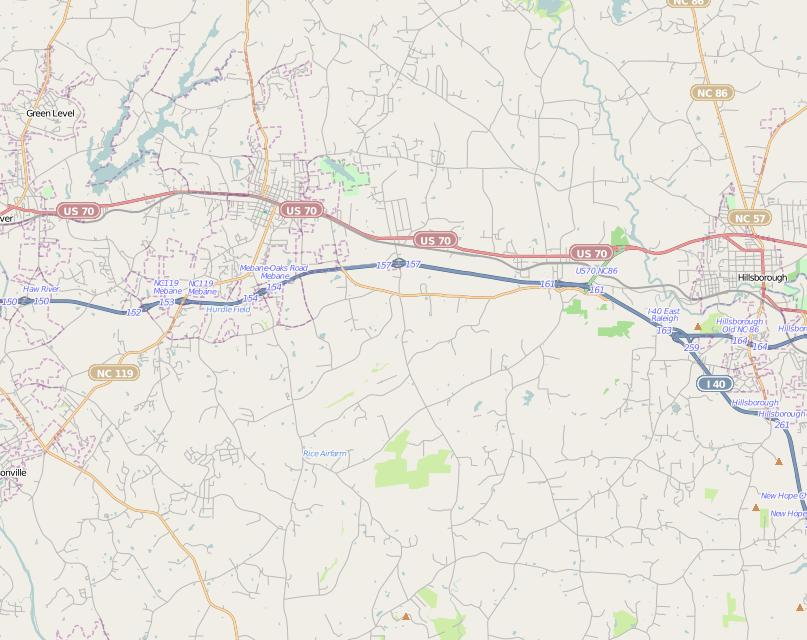
Example of road system in a non-PLSS area; North Carolina

=== Urban design ===
As roads have typically been laid out along section boundaries spaced one mile (1.6 km) apart, growing urban areas have adopted road grids with mile-long "blocks" as their primary street network. Such roads in urban areas are known as section line roads, usually designed primarily for automobile travel and limited in their use for non-motorized travel. In post-World War II suburbs, commercial development has largely occurred along and at intersections of arterials, while the rest of the former square-mile sections have generally filled with residential development, as well as schools, religious facilities, and parks. One example of this is the Mile Road System of Detroit, Michigan.

Occasionally, and more frequently in a metropolitan region's inner postwar suburbs than in outer areas, arterials are at approximately half-mile intervals. This strictly regimented urban (or suburban) structure has coincided with the similarly strict practice of Euclidean zoning (named after the town of Euclid, Ohio, which won a 1926 Supreme Court case Village of Euclid, Ohio v. Ambler Realty Co., which established the constitutionality of zoning). In Euclidean zoning, use of a property is dictated and regulated by zoning district, the boundaries of which are often based on locations of arterials.

West of the Appalachians, road systems frequently follow the PLSS grid structure. The results can be 90-degree intersections and very long stretches of straight roads.

=== Popular culture ===
The land system is an important part of American history and culture. Among other things, the stock phrases "lower 40", "front 40", "back 40", and "40 acres and a mule", which are sometimes heard in American movies, reference the quarter-quarter section. The "lower 40" in a quarter-section is the one at lowest elevation, i.e. in the direction that water drains. The "lower 40" is frequently the location of or the direction of a stream or a pond. The phrase "40 acres and a mule" was the compensation apocryphally promised by the Freedmen's Bureau following the American Civil War.

Homesteading, a staple of American western culture, was dependent on the PLSS. In the original Homestead Act of 1862, during the Lincoln administration, each settler was allocated 160 acres (0.65 km^{2}) of land, a quarter-section. Later amendments of the Homestead Act allocated more land, as much as 640 acres (2.6 km^{2}), a section. This was a good revision to apply to land that was drier or more desolate than the earlier, more desirable lands that had already been settled. Many times, this land was more suited to ranching than to farming.

== See also ==
- Cadastre#United States
- Dominion Land Survey (Canada)
- Great Trigonometrical Survey (Indian subcontinent)
- Centuriation#Orientation (Groma surveying)
- Louisiana Purchase State Park (beginning point of the Louisiana Purchase survey)
- Lot and Block survey system
- Indian Land Cessions in the United States
- History of surveying in the United States
- Hydrologic unit system (United States)
