= United States Military District =

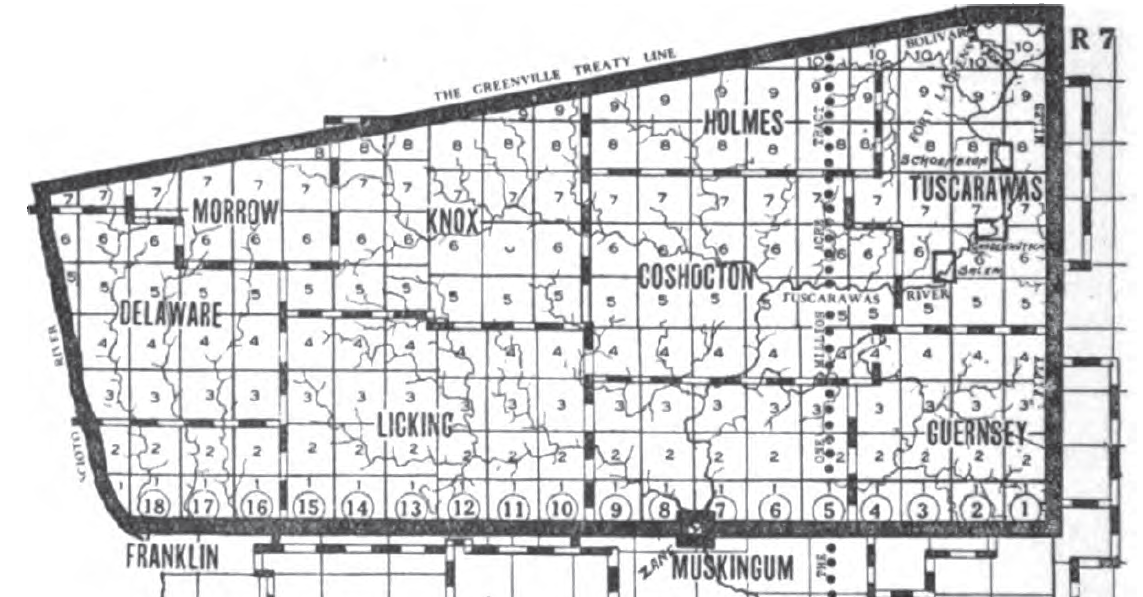
The US Military District

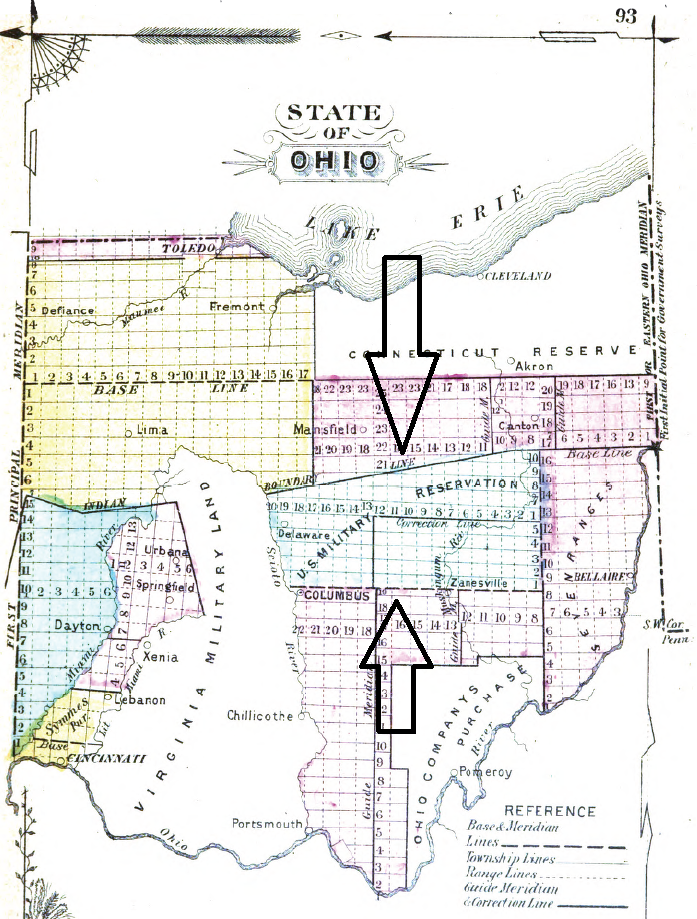
The District lies between the arrows

The United States Military District was a land tract in central Ohio that was established by the Congress to compensate veterans of the American Revolutionary War for their service with land grants. The tract contained 2,539,110 acres (10,275.4 km^{2}) in Noble, Guernsey, Tuscarawas, Muskingum, Coshocton, Holmes, Licking, Knox, Franklin, Delaware, Morrow, and Marion counties.

== History ==
The Congress had little money to pay the soldiers who fought for independence. They made promises of land to induce army enlistment. By resolutions of September 16 and 18, 1776, and August 12, September 22, and October 3, 1780, they proposed to give each officer or private continuously to serve in the United States army until the close of the war, or until discharged, or to the representatives of those slain by the enemy, the amounts in the table.

Bounty (acres)	Ranks
1100	Major General
850	Brigadier General, Director
500	Colonel, Chief Physician, Purveyor
450	Lieutenant Colonel, Physician, Surgeon, Apothecary
400	Major, Regimental Surgeon, Asst. Apothecary
300	Captain, Surgeons Mate
200	Lieutenant
150	Ensign
100	Non-commissioned officer, Soldier

Under the Land Ordinance of 1785, land was made available in the Seven Ranges for bounties, but this proved inadequate.

== Location and subdivision ==
On June 1, 1796, Congress created the United States Military District, sometimes called the USMD Lands, or USMD Survey. The boundaries of the district were to start at the northwest corner of the Seven Ranges, now known as the Seven Ranges Terminus (40°39′07″N 81°20′05″W), then proceed 50 miles (80 km) south along the west edge of the Seven Ranges (39°55′14″N 81°19′56″W), then proceed due west to the Scioto River (39°59′23″N 83°04′03″W), then up the Scioto River to the Greenville Treaty Line (40°28′02″N 83°11′28″W), then northeast along the Greenville Treaty Line to Fort Laurens (40°39′15″N 81°28′25″W), then up the Tuscarawas River to a point due west of the Seven Ranges Terminus, then east to the point of beginning. It turned out that the Tuscarawas River leg was unnecessary because Fort Laurens happens to be due west of the Seven Ranges Terminus. This tract contains 2,539,110 acres. Survey of the land began in March, 1797. The land was to be divided into survey townships five miles (8 km) square (16000 acres), the only instance of a government conducted survey not based on the six mile (10 km) square township standard of the Public Land Survey System. Other instances of five mile square townships were for the Firelands and Connecticut Western Reserve, which were privately surveyed. Each township was divided into quarters of 4,000 acres (16 km^{2}). Ranges were numbered starting from the meridian along the east edge, and townships were numbered starting from the baseline along the south of the tract. The quarter townships were numbered starting with 1 in the northeast and proceeding anti-clockwise. The Act of March 1, 1800 provided for dividing quarter townships into lots of 100 acres (0.40 km^{2}) each, 880 yards in width by 550 yards in height.

On March 3, 1803, the unclaimed land was divided into one mile (1.6 km) square sections and into half sections, and sold as essentially Congress Lands by the Chillicothe and Zanesville land offices.

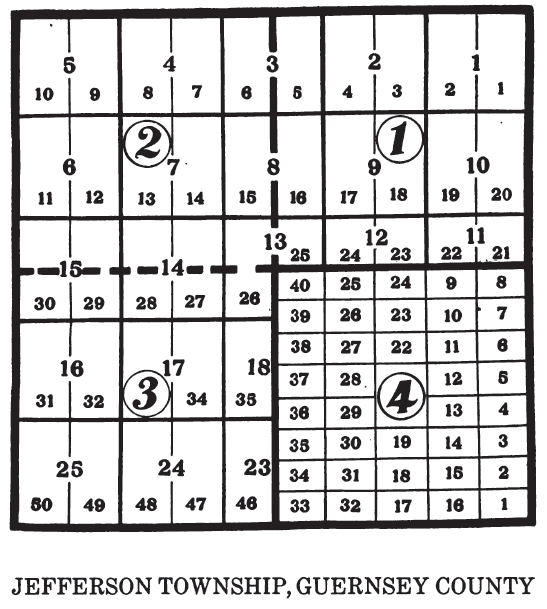
A USMD township divided into quarters. 100 acre lots in quarter 4 for warrants. One half square mile lots in quarters 1-3, divided for sale as Congress Lands

== Claims ==
In the USMD, as elsewhere in the surveyed lands, many veterans sold their warrants to speculators or jobbers at a fraction of their true value. Of the 1,043,460 acres (4,222.7 km^{2}) claimed by land warrant, 569,542 acres (2,304.85 km^{2}) were patented to just 22 persons. The actual location of the 262 quarter townships claimed by military warrants was determined by a drawing. Few absentee owners ever visited their land, and fewer still spent any time on it. They sold it, sight unseen, as a speculative venture, often paying no regard to any attachment of sale made by Ohio officials for delinquent taxes.

By 1823, the United States government had issued 10,958 warrants for service in the Revolutionary War totaling 1,549,350 acres (6,270.0 km^{2}), and more were issued under various laws thereafter. These warrants could only be used in the USMD except for those used in the Ohio Company lands or in the Symmes Purchase. Veterans who held on to their warrants finally received relief by the act of May 30, 1830, which allowed them to exchange their warrants for land scrip issued in 80-acre (320,000 m^{2}) amounts, good for $1.25 an acre on land anywhere in the public domain available for private entry. This act, plus seven other warrant exchange acts, caused more than 12,138,840 acres (49,124.1 km^{2}) of land scrip to be issued. Researchers will find that land scrip could be bought cheaply, depending on market conditions. Its use in land transactions does not infer the holder was entitled to it by military service. Veterans often sold their land scrip to land jobbers.

== Exclusions ==
The Moravian Indian Grants at the Tuscarawas County villages of Schoenbrunn, Gnaddenhutten and Salem are independent 4,000-acre (16 km^{2}) surveys, not on the same grid, within the USMD. Part of the independent “Muskingum River Survey” of Zane's Tracts also lies in the USMD.

== See also ==
- Ohio Lands
- Historic regions of the United States
- Military Tract of 1812 - a similar tract set aside for War of 1812 veterans.
