= Samuel Hildreth =

Samuel Hildreth may refer to:

- Samuel Hildreth (American Revolution) (1750–1823), surgeon in the Massachusetts militia
- Samuel Prescott Hildreth (1783–1863), physician, scientist and historian
- Sam Hildreth (1866–1929), American horse racing trainer and owner
