= Purchase on the Muskingum =

Coordinates: 39°32′05″N 82°06′31″W

The Ohio Company lands are labeled on this map of Ohio.

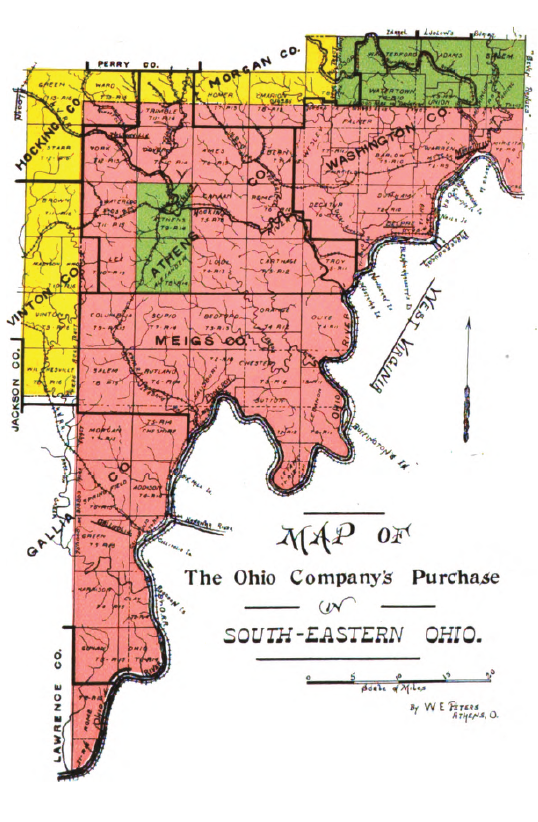
The Purchase on the Muskingum is the yellow area, to the northwest of the First Purchase in pink.

The Purchase on the Muskingum also called Ohio Company's Second Purchase, was a tract of land in the Northwest Territory, later Ohio, that the Ohio Company of Associates purchased from the United States federal government in 1792.

== History ==
In 1787 the Ohio Company of Associates contracted to buy 1,500,000 acres (6,100 km^{2}) of land in southern Ohio for one million dollars. They ended up only being able to raise $500,000, and so were sold a tract of 750,000 acres (3,000 km^{2}), plus lands set aside for support of local schools, a college, and the clergy, for a total tract size of 913,833 acres (3,698.15 km^{2}) at the confluence of the Ohio River and the Muskingum River. The community of Marietta, Ohio was established in 1788.

== Second Purchase ==
The United States granted veterans of the Revolutionary war land bounties for their service because money to pay them was short. The bounty depended upon rank. The associates of the Ohio Company gathered together their bounties in 1792 and accumulated a total of 142,900 acres (578 km^{2}). The government allowed a one third discount on purchases by the Ohio Company, so the government allowed a total sale of 214,285 acres (867.18 km^{2}). These lands were to the north and northwest of the First Purchase in portions of Morgan, Hocking, Vinton and Athens Counties. The Second Purchase was surveyed on the plan of the Land Ordinance of 1785. The Second Purchase had no sections set aside for schools or ministry.

== See also ==
- Ohio Lands
- Historic regions of the United States
- Ohio Company of Associates

== Bibliography ==
- Hildreth, S.P. (1848). Pioneer History: Being an Account of the First Examinations of the Ohio Valley, and the Early Settlement of the Northwest Territory. H. W. Derby and Co.
- Hulbert, Archer Butler (1917). The Records of the Original Proceedings of the Ohio Company, Volume I. Marietta Historical Commission.
- Hulbert, Archer Butler (1917). The Records of the Original Proceedings of the Ohio Company, Volume II. Marietta Historical Commission.
- Summers, Thomas J. (1903). History of Marietta. The Leader Publishing Co.
- Peters, William E. (1918). Ohio Lands and Their Subdivision. W.E. Peters. pp. 237–258.
