= Nathaniel Saltonstall (disambiguation) =

Nathaniel Saltonstall may refer to:

- Nathaniel Saltonstall (c. 1639 – 1707), judge in Massachusetts during the Salem Witch Trials of 1692.
- Nathaniel Saltonstall (American Revolution) (1727–1807), Connecticut militiaman and a captain of Connecticut naval privateer ships during the American Revolutionary War.
