= Bunch-of-Grapes =

Former tavern located in Boston, Massachusetts, United States

Coordinates: 42°21′32.3″N 71°3′21.09″W

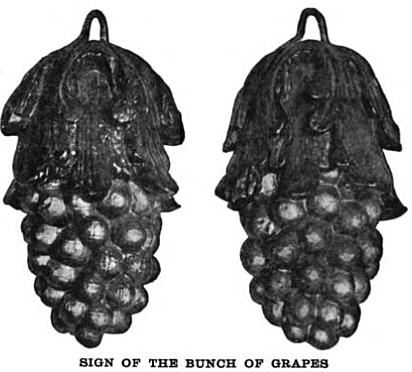
- Sign of the Bunch-of-Grapes tavern during 17th-18th c.

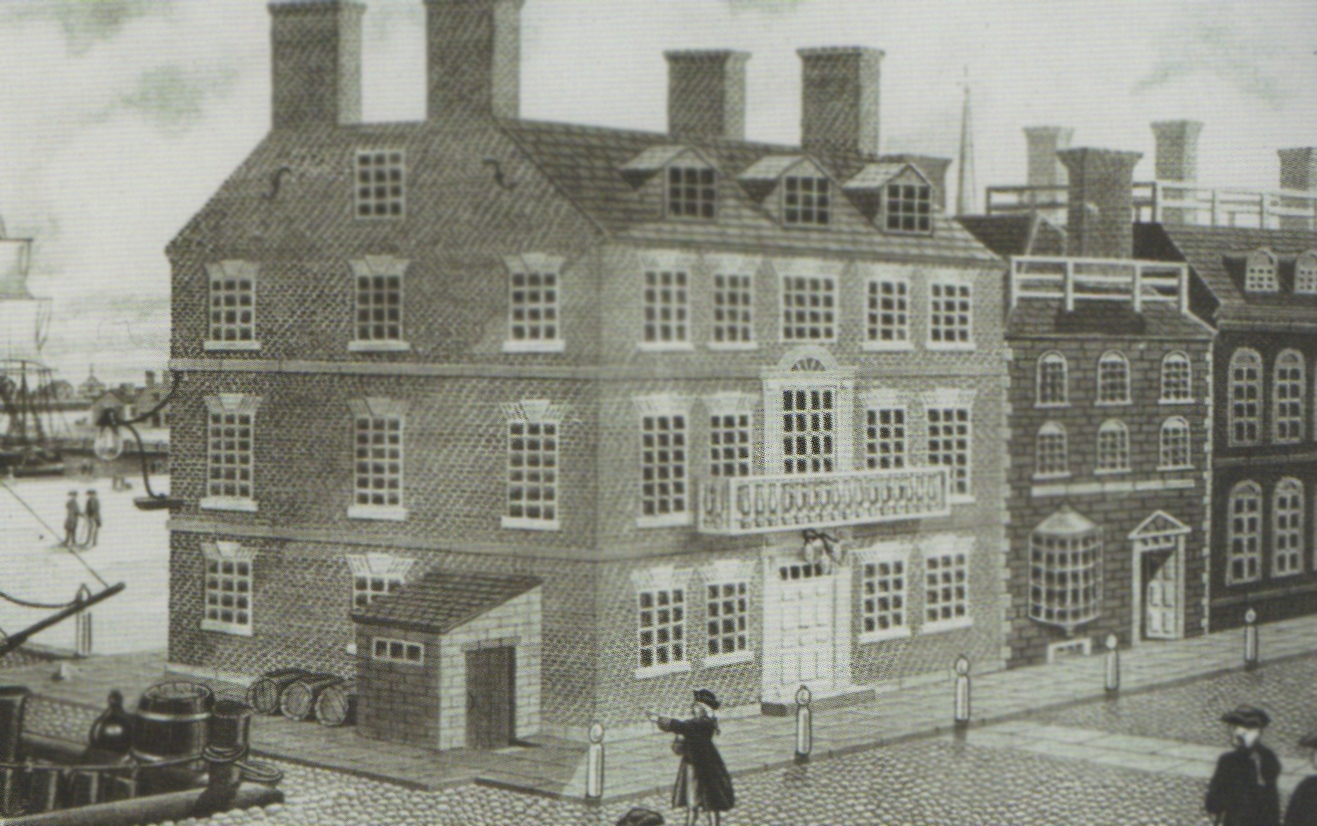
- Interactive map of the Bunch-of-Grapes area

General information
- Type: Tavern
- Location: King Street, Province of Massachusetts Bay
- Construction started: 1733
- Demolished: 1798
- Client: Paul Revere; James Henry Craig; Marquis de Lafayette; General John Stark; Rufus Putnam; Benjamin Tupper; Samuel Holden Parsons; Manasseh Cutler
- Affiliation: Grand Lodge of Massachusetts; Ohio Company of Associates

The Bunch-of-Grapes was a tavern located on King Street in Boston, Province of Massachusetts Bay. It served multiple functions in the life of the town, as one could buy drinks and meet friends, business associates and political co-conspirators. The facade of the Bunch-of-Grapes building featured an iconic sign: "Three gilded clusters of grapes dangled temptingly over the door before the eye of the passer-by."

== Brief history ==
Notable events occurred on tavern premises. "On Monday, July 30, 1733, the first grand lodge of Masons in America was organized here by Henry Price, a Boston tailor, who had received authority from Lord Montague, Grand Master of England, for the purpose." In 1769, the tavern offered tickets for "Love in a Village", the first professional opera performance in Boston. Artist Christian Remick (b.1726) displayed his paintings in the tavern in 1769.

A darker chapter in the tavern's history involved slavery. For potential buyers, a "search for slave labor in Boston began and ended along the bustling King Street corridor that connected the warehouses of Long Wharf to the commercial center of town. Three of Boston's busiest public houses―the Royal Exchange, the Crown Coffee-House and the Bunch of Grapes tavern―lined that 0.5-mile (0.80 km) stretch. All offered fine drink and lively conversation, and at times all served as clearinghouses for slaves."

In the Revolution era, "the Bunch of Grapes became the resort of the High Whigs, who made it a sort of political headquarters, in which patriotism only passed current, and it was known as the Whig tavern." Paul Revere and others gathered here. However, during the British occupation of Boston, British troops met at the tavern. In January 1776, James Henry Craig, company commander of the 47th (Lancashire) Regiment of Foot, arranged a meeting at the tavern: "The ancient and most benevolent of the Friendly Brothers of St. Patrick. The Principal Knot of the 47th Regiment is to meet at the Bunch of Grapes on Thursday the 29th inst. at eleven o'clock in the forenoon." After the Siege of Boston ended in March 1776, "General Washington was handsomely entertained" at the Bunch-of-Grapes, as were Lafayette and General John Stark.

In March, 1786, Rufus Putnam, Benjamin Tupper, Samuel Holden Parsons and Manasseh Cutler met at the tavern and formed the Ohio Company of Associates, which led to a contract being drawn up that sold about five percent of the State of Ohio to this group of Revolutionary War Veterans. This land was in the Southeastern part of Ohio. Provisions of the contract included setting aside two townships in the center of the purchase for a university. Thus, Ohio University (first chartered as American Western University) became the first land grant institution of higher education in the United States, preceding the more famous Morrill Act land grant institutions by nearly three-quarters of a century.

Owners of the tavern included William Davis (prior to 1658), William Ingram (1658); John Holbrook (1680), Thomas Waite (1731), and Elisha Doane (1773). Keepers of the tavern included: Francis Holmes (1690–1712); Mrs. Francis Holmes (1712–ca.1731); William Coffin (1731–1733); Edward Lutwich (1734); Joshua Barker (1749); Mr. Weatherhead (1750–ca.1757); Joseph Ingersol (1764–1772); John Marston (ca.1776–1778); William Foster (1782); James Vila (1789); and Dudley Colman (1790).

The Bunch-of-Grapes building was demolished in 1798, and a commemorative plaque exists on the State Street site today.

== Bibliography ==
- Randall, Emilius Oviatt (1850-1919): The Bunch of Grapes Tavern, Ohio Archæological and Historical Society Publications: Volume 20 [1911], p. 136.
