= Manasseh Cutler =

American clergyman and politician (1742–1823)

The Reverend Manasseh Cutler
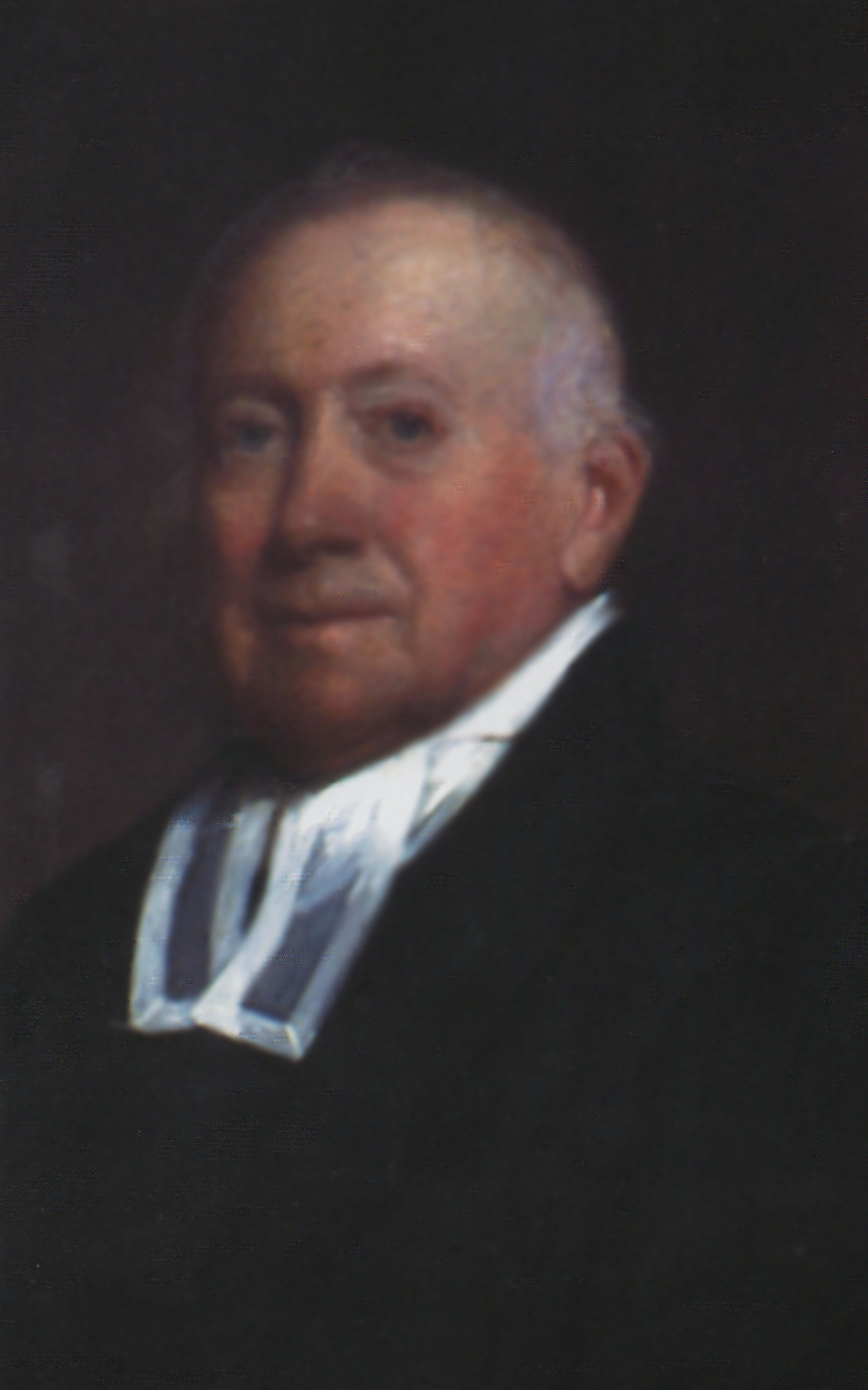

Member of the U.S. House of Representatives from Massachusetts
- In office March 4, 1801 – March 3, 1805
- Preceded by: Bailey Bartlett
- Succeeded by: Jeremiah Nelson
- Constituency: 11th district (1801–1803); 3rd district (1803–1805)

Personal details
- Born: May 13, 1742 Killingly, Connecticut Colony, British America
- Died: July 28, 1823 (aged 81) Hamilton, Massachusetts, U.S.
- Party: Federalist
- Education: Yale College

Military service
- Allegiance: United States
- Branch/service: Continental Army
- Years of service: 1776, 1778
- Rank: Chaplain
- Unit: 11th Massachusetts Regiment
- Battles/wars: American Revolutionary War: Battle of Rhode Island

Manasseh Cutler (May 13, 1742 – July 28, 1823) was an American Congregational clergyman involved in the American Revolutionary War. He was influential in the passage of the Northwest Ordinance of 1787 and wrote the section prohibiting slavery in the Northwest Territory. Cutler was also a member of the United States House of Representatives. Cutler is "rightly entitled to be called 'The Father of Ohio University.'"

== Biography ==
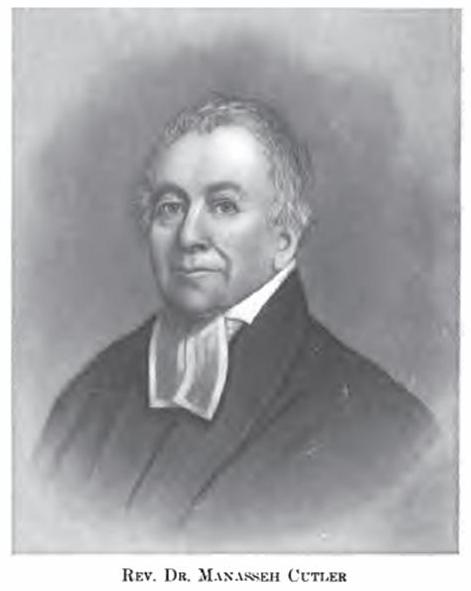
Another portrait of Manasseh Cutler

Cutler was born in Killingly in the Connecticut Colony. In 1765, he graduated from Yale College and after being a school teacher in Dedham and a merchant — and occasionally appearing in court as a lawyer — he decided to enter the ministry. He married Mary Balch within a year of graduating from Yale. Mary's sister, Hannah, married Jabez Chickering, making Cutler the uncle of their son, also named Jabez Chickering. Cutler studied under Mary's father, Thomas Balch, the minister at Dedham's Second Parish Church, for the ministry. From 1771 until his death, he was pastor of the Congregational church in what was the parish of Ipswich, Massachusetts until 1793, now Hamilton. For a few months in 1776, he was chaplain to the 11th Massachusetts Regiment commanded by Colonel Ebenezer Francis, raised for the defense of Boston. In 1778, he became chaplain to General Jonathan Titcomb's brigade and took part in General John Sullivan's expedition to Rhode Island. Soon after his return from this expedition he trained in medicine to supplement the scanty income of a minister. In 1782, he established a private boarding school, directing it for nearly a quarter of a century. In 1784 a geological party, headed by Manasseh Cutler, named the highest peak in the northeast Mount Washington.

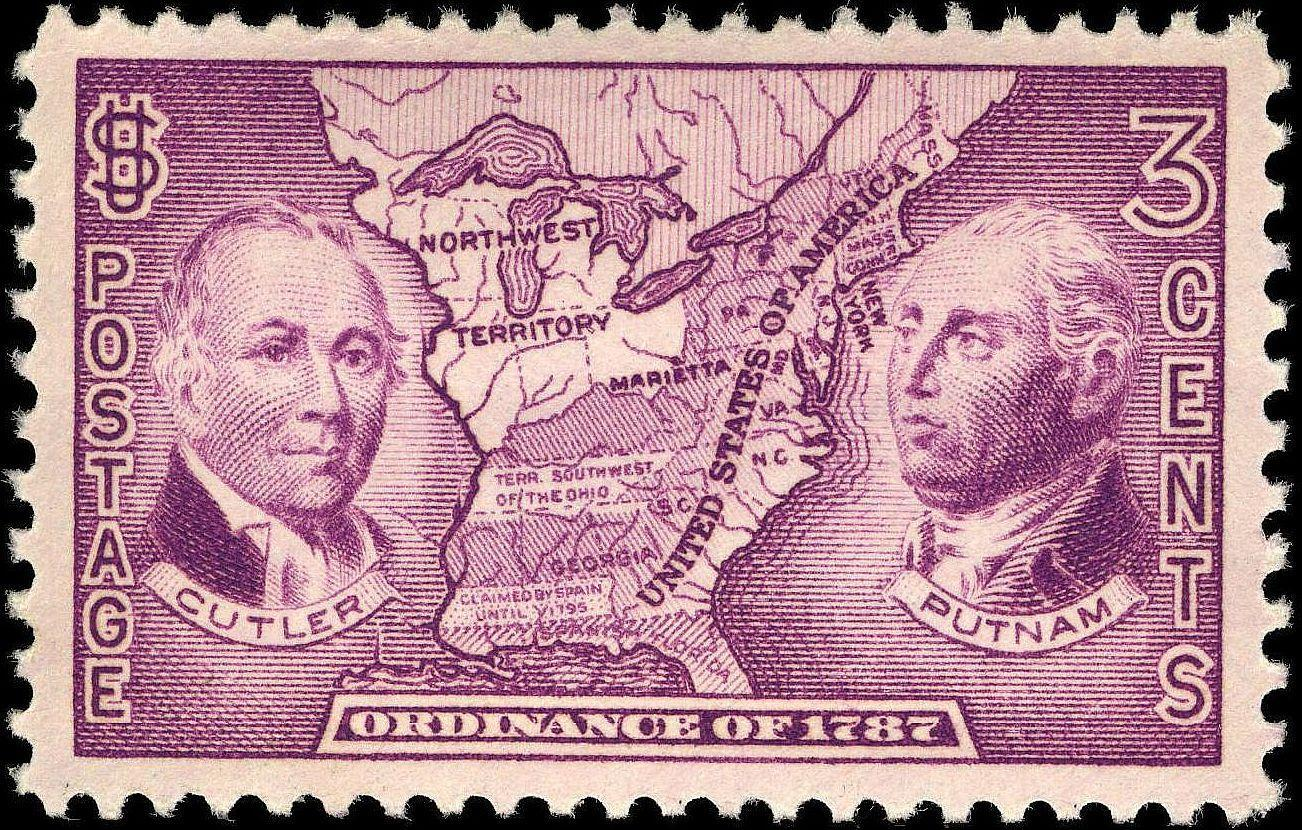
Postage stamp commemorating Manasseh Cutler, Rufus Putnam and the Northwest Ordinance

In 1786, Cutler became interested in the settlement of western lands by American pioneers to the Northwest Territory. On March 1, 1786, Cutler attended a meeting at the Bunch of Grapes Tavern with Rufus Putnam, Benjamin Tupper, and Samuel Holden Parsons to form the Ohio Company of Associates, which led to a contract being drawn up, later approved by the Confederation Congress, that sold about five percent of what was to become the State of Ohio to this group of Revolutionary War Veterans. Provisions of the contract included setting aside two townships in the center of the purchase for a university; these "College Lands" are in Appalachia. The following year, as agent of the Ohio Company of Associates that he had been involved in creating, he organized a contract with Congress whereby his associates (former soldiers of the Revolutionary War) might purchase one and a half million acres (6,000 km^{2}) of land at the mouth of the Muskingum River with their Certificate of Indebtedness. During the Continental Congress, Cutler took a leading part in drafting the famous Northwest Ordinance of 1787 for the government of the Northwest Territory, particularly its prohibitions regarding slavery in the new territories, which was finally presented to Congress by Massachusetts delegate Nathan Dane. In order to smooth passage of the Northwest Ordinance, Cutler influenced and won the votes of key congressmen by making them partners in his land company. By changing the office of provisional governor from an elected to an appointed position, Cutler was able to offer the position to the president of Congress, Arthur St. Clair.

Cutler was friends with Benjamin Franklin, and kept detailed notes during the Constitutional Convention about his visits to Franklin's Philadelphia, Pennsylvania residence and the wonders Franklin kept there. Cutler was elected a Fellow of the American Academy of Arts and Sciences in 1781. Besides being proficient in the theology, law and medicine of his day, he conducted painstaking astronomical and meteorological investigations and was one of the first Americans to conduct significant botanical research. He is considered a founder of Ohio University and the National Historic Landmark Cutler Hall on that campus is named in his honor. In 1785, Cutler was elected a member of the American Philosophical Society. He received the degree of Doctor of Laws from Yale University in 1789.

From 1801 to 1805, Cutler was a Federalist representative of Massachusetts in the U.S. Congress. He was elected a member of the American Antiquarian Society in 1813.

Cutler died in 1823 at Hamilton, Massachusetts. Three of his descendants were members of the U.S. Congress-and one vice president:

- William P. Cutler [1812-1889] son of Ephraim Cutler
- Rufus Dawes [1838-1899] father of Vice President Charles Gates Dawes and Beman Gates Dawes; he was the son of Mrs. Sarah (Cutler) Dawes daughter of Ephraim Cutler
- Beman Gates Dawes [1870-1953] son of Congressman Rufus Dawes
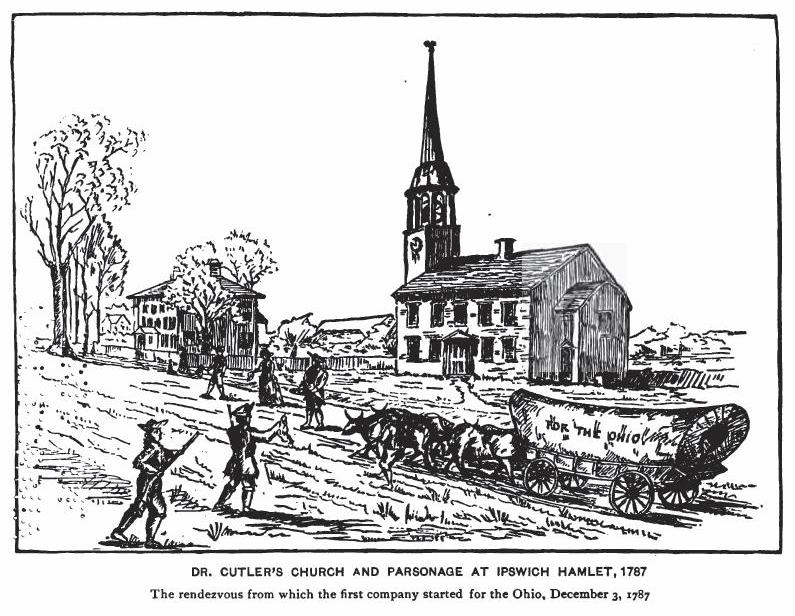
Departure of pioneers from Manasseh Cutler's parsonage in 1787

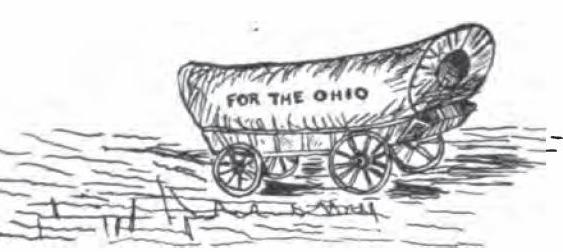
Manasseh Cutler prepared this wagon for the first pioneers to the Ohio Country

== See also ==
- Ephraim Cutler
- William P. Cutler
- Manasseh Cutler Hall
- History of Ohio University

U.S. House of Representatives
Preceded by Bailey Bartlett	Member of the U.S. House of Representatives from Massachusetts's 11th congressional district March 4, 1801 – March 3, 1803	Succeeded by William Stedman (district moved)
Preceded by Ebenezer Mattoon	Member of the U.S. House of Representatives from Massachusetts's 3rd congressional district March 4, 1803 – March 3, 1805	Succeeded by Jeremiah Nelson
