= List of United States Supreme Court cases, volume 51 =

Supreme Court of the United States
- Interactive map of Supreme Court of the United States
- 38°53′26″N 77°00′16″W
- Established: March 4, 1789; 236 years ago
- Location: Washington, D.C.
- Coordinates: 38°53′26″N 77°00′16″W
- Composition method: Presidential nomination with Senate confirmation
- Authorised by: Constitution of the United States, Art. III, § 1
- Judge term length: life tenure, subject to impeachment and removal
- Number of positions: 9 (by statute)
- Website: supremecourt.gov

This is a list of cases reported in volume 51 (10 How.) of United States Reports, decided by the Supreme Court of the United States in 1850 and 1851.

== Nominative reports ==
In 1874, the U.S. government created the United States Reports, and retroactively numbered older privately published case reports as part of the new series. As a result, cases appearing in volumes 1–90 of U.S. Reports have dual citation forms; one for the volume number of U.S. Reports, and one for the volume number of the reports named for the relevant reporter of decisions (these are called "nominative reports").

=== Benjamin Chew Howard ===
Starting with the 42nd volume of U.S. Reports, the Reporter of Decisions of the Supreme Court of the United States was Benjamin Chew Howard. Howard was Reporter of Decisions from 1843 to 1860, covering volumes 42 through 65 of United States Reports which correspond to volumes 1 through 24 of his Howard's Reports. As such, the dual form of citation to, for example, Butler v. Pennsylvania is 51 U.S. (10 How.) 402 (1851).

== Justices of the Supreme Court at the time of 51 U.S. (10 How.) ==
The Supreme Court is established by Article III, Section 1 of the Constitution of the United States, which says: "The judicial Power of the United States, shall be vested in one supreme Court . . .". The size of the Court is not specified; the Constitution leaves it to Congress to set the number of justices. Under the Judiciary Act of 1789 Congress originally fixed the number of justices at six (one chief justice and five associate justices). Since 1789 Congress has varied the size of the Court from six to seven, nine, ten, and back to nine justices (always including one chief justice).

When the cases in 51 U.S. (10 How.) were decided the Court comprised these nine members:

Portrait	Justice	Office	Home State	Succeeded	Date confirmed by the Senate (Vote)	Tenure on Supreme Court
	Roger B. Taney	Chief Justice	Maryland	John Marshall	March 15, 1836 (29–15)	March 28, 1836 – October 12, 1864 (Died)
	John McLean	Associate Justice	Ohio	Robert Trimble	March 7, 1829 (Acclamation)	January 11, 1830 – April 4, 1861 (Died)
	James Moore Wayne	Associate Justice	Georgia	William Johnson	January 9, 1835 (Acclamation)	January 14, 1835 – July 5, 1867 (Died)
	John Catron	Associate Justice	Tennessee	newly created seat	March 8, 1837 (28–15)	May 1, 1837 – May 30, 1865 (Died)
	John McKinley	Associate Justice	Alabama	newly created seat	September 25, 1837 (Acclamation)	January 9, 1838 – July 19, 1852 (Died)
	Peter Vivian Daniel	Associate Justice	Virginia	Philip P. Barbour	March 2, 1841 (25–5)	January 10, 1842 – May 31, 1860 (Died)
	Samuel Nelson	Associate Justice	New York	Smith Thompson	February 14, 1845 (Acclamation)	February 27, 1845 – November 28, 1872 (Retired)
	Levi Woodbury	Associate Justice	New Hampshire	Joseph Story	January 31, 1846 (Acclamation)	September 23, 1845 – September 4, 1851 (Died)
	Robert Cooper Grier	Associate Justice	Pennsylvania	Henry Baldwin	August 4, 1846 (Acclamation)	August 10, 1846 – January 31, 1870 (Retired)

== Notable case in 51 U.S. (10 How.) ==
=== Strader v. Graham ===
In Strader v. Graham 51 U.S. (10 How.) 82 (1851), the Supreme Court held that the status of three slaves who went by steamboat from the slave state of Kentucky to the free states of Indiana and Ohio depended on Kentucky law rather than on Indiana or Ohio law. The slaves later escaped to Canada. Kentucky law made steamboat operators liable for the value of any slaves escaping by the boat. Writing for the Court, Chief Justice Roger Taney accepted the conclusions of the Supreme Court of Kentucky that refused to rule on the status of the slaves unless they were parties to the lawsuit, and that Kentucky need not apply Indiana or Ohio law under which the three slaves would be considered freed.

== Citation style ==
Under the Judiciary Act of 1789 the federal court structure at the time comprised District Courts, which had general trial jurisdiction; Circuit Courts, which had mixed trial and appellate (from the US District Courts) jurisdiction; and the United States Supreme Court, which had appellate jurisdiction over the federal District and Circuit courts—and for certain issues over state courts. The Supreme Court also had limited original jurisdiction (i.e., in which cases could be filed directly with the Supreme Court without first having been heard by a lower federal or state court). There were one or more federal District Courts and/or Circuit Courts in each state, territory, or other geographical region.

Bluebook citation style is used for case names, citations, and jurisdictions.

- "C.C.D." = United States Circuit Court for the District of . . .
  - e.g.,"C.C.D.N.J." = United States Circuit Court for the District of New Jersey
- "D." = United States District Court for the District of . . .
  - e.g.,"D. Mass." = United States District Court for the District of Massachusetts
- "E." = Eastern; "M." = Middle; "N." = Northern; "S." = Southern; "W." = Western
  - e.g.,"C.C.S.D.N.Y." = United States Circuit Court for the Southern District of New York
  - e.g.,"M.D. Ala." = United States District Court for the Middle District of Alabama
- "Ct. Cl." = United States Court of Claims
- The abbreviation of a state's name alone indicates the highest appellate court in that state's judiciary at the time.
  - e.g.,"Pa." = Supreme Court of Pennsylvania
  - e.g.,"Me." = Supreme Judicial Court of Maine

== List of cases in 51 U.S. (10 How.) ==
Case Name	Page and year	Opinion of the Court	Concurring opinion(s)	Dissenting opinion(s)	Lower Court	Disposition
Missouri v. Iowa	1 (1851)	per curiam	none	none	original	boundary set
Webster v. Cooper	54 (1850)	Taney	none	none	C.C.D. Me.	certification
Shelby v. Bacon	56 (1850)	McLean	none	none	C.C.E.D. Pa.	certification
McNulty v. Batty	72 (1851)	Nelson	none	none	Sup. Ct. Terr. Wis.	writ abated
Preston v. Bracken	81 (1851)	Nelson	none	none	Sup. Ct. Terr. Wis.	writ abated
Strader v. Graham	82 (1851)	Taney	McLean, Catron	none	Ky.	dismissed
Wilson v. Sanford	99 (1851)	Taney	none	none	C.C.D. La.	dismissed
Downs v. Kissam	102 (1850)	McLean	none	none	C.C.S.D. Miss.	reversed
Hoyt v. United States	109 (1850)	Nelson	none	none	C.C.S.D.N.Y.	affirmed
Ex parte Rhodes	144 (1851)	Taney	none	none	D. Tex.	dismissal denied
Oldfield v. Marriott	146 (1851)	Wayne	none	none	C.C.D. Md.	affirmed
Hallett v. Collins	174 (1850)	Grier	none	none	C.C.S.D. Ala.	affirmed
Sears v. Eastburn	187 (1850)	Taney	none	none	C.C.S.D. Ala.	reversed
Woodruff v. Trapnall	190 (1851)	McLean	none	Grier	Ark.	reversed
Paup v. Drew	218 (1851)	McLean	Daniel, Nelson	none	Ark.	affirmed
Trigg v. Drew	224 (1851)	McLean	none	none	Ark.	affirmed
Greely v. Thompson	225 (1851)	Woodbury	none	none	C.C.D. Mass.	affirmed
Maxwell v. Griswold	242 (1851)	Woodbury	none	none	C.C.S.D.N.Y.	affirmed
Gilmer v. Poindexter	257 (1851)	Daniel	none	none	C.C.D. La.	reversed
Barnard v. Adams	270 (1851)	Grier	none	Daniel	C.C.S.D.N.Y.	affirmed
Henderson v. Tennessee	311 (1851)	Taney	none	Woodbury	Tenn.	dismissed
Stimpson v. Baltimore and Susquehanna Railroad Company	329 (1850)	Daniel	none	none	C.C.D. Md.	affirmed
Landes v. Brant	348 (1851)	Catron	none	none	C.C.D. Mo.	affirmed
Philadelphia and Wilmington Railroad Company v. Maryland	376 (1851)	Taney	none	none	Md.	affirmed
Baltimore and Susquehanna Railroad Company v. Nesbit	395 (1851)	Daniel	none	none	Baltimore Cnty. Ct.	affirmed
Butler v. Pennsylvania	402 (1851)	Daniel	none	McLean	Pa.	affirmed
Washington, Alexandria and Georgetown Steam Packet Company v. Sickles	419 (1851)	Grier	none	none	C.C.D.C.	reversed
United States v. Brooks	442 (1851)	Wayne	none	none	C.C.D. La.	affirmed
Louisville Manufacturing Company v. Welch	461 (1851)	Nelson	none	none	C.C.D. La.	reversed
Gayler v. Wilder I	477 (1851)	Taney	none	McLean	C.C.S.D.N.Y.	affirmed
Novelty means knowledge or use accessible to the public.
Gayler v. Wilder II	509 (1851)	Taney	none	none	C.C.S.D.N.Y.	rehearing denied
Town of East Hartford v. Hartford Bridge Company	511 (1851)	Woodbury	none	none	Conn.	affirmed
Villalobos v. United States	541 (1851)	Catron	none	none	Fla. Super. Ct.	affirmed
St. John v. Paine	557 (1851)	Nelson	none	none	C.C.S.D.N.Y.	affirmed
Newton v. Stebbins	586 (1851)	Nelson	none	Daniel	C.C.S.D.N.Y.	affirmed
United States v. d'Auterive	609 (1851)	Daniel	none	none	D. La.	reversed
Robinson v. Minor	627 (1851)	McLean	none	none	C.C.S.D. Miss.	affirmed

== See also ==
- Certificate of division
