= Canadian and Nova Scotia Refugee Tract =

The Canadian and Nova Scotia Refugee Tract was a land grant in the U.S. state of New York for displaced Canadians and Nova Scotians who had served in the American Revolutionary War. This included those who had served in Moses Hazen's 2nd Canadian Regiment. Members of Colonel James Livingston's 1st Canadian Regiment and Colonel Josiah Throop's Nova Scotian refugees were also eligible to claim land in the tract.

The Canadians, including Hazen, an American who owned land in Canada, could not return to Canada after the war and were considered refugees. When Hazen's regiment was disbanded in 1783, his Canadian troops joined their families who had settled in refugee camps in Albany and Fishkill, New York. The refugees initially received three months' pay and rations from Congress. Before the war's end, Hazen had been working to secure land grants from the U.S. The Congress of the Confederation was unable to approve the grants, but the New York State Legislature created the Canadian and Nova Scotia Refugee Tract along Lake Champlain (Ch. 63 of the Laws of 1784).

Refugees who had sided with the colonies during the war had to prove that they had lived in New York for at least two years before November 1, 1782. The refugees took possession of their land in 1786. A total of 252 refugees were granted lots in the tract, which comprised 231,540 acres. The lots were 80, 333, or 420 acres in size. Many refugees did not claim their lots or quickly resold them to speculators. Benjamin Mooers, a nephew of Moses Hazen, acquired 49,400 acres of the tract, including a large portion of the town of Mooers, which was named after him. Pliny Moore was another significant purchaser of land in the tract. His holdings, along with 11,600 acres near the Great Chazy River, became the village of Champlain. When the claim period expired, much of the tract remained unoccupied by the refugees, and the land reverted to the state.

Due to delays in land allotment and a shortage of rations, some refugees returned to Canada or settled in other parts of New York. However, French-Canadian refugees eventually founded settlements at Chazy Landing, Corbeau (now Coopersville), and Rouses Point, on or near Lake Champlain.

== See also ==
- Land Ordinance of 1785
- Refugee Tract, a similar land grant in Ohio for Canadians and Nova Scotians, allotted in 1801 and 1812
