= Land Ordinance of 1784 =

Articles-of-Confederation-era United States law (predating the Constitution)

The Ordinance of 1784 (enacted April 23, 1784) called for the land in the recently created United States which was located west of the Appalachian Mountains, north of the Ohio River and east of the Mississippi River to be divided into separate states.

== Adoption of Usa ==
The ordinance was adopted by the United States Congress of the Confederation in 1784. Written principally by Thomas Jefferson, it made provisions for western lands. His original draft contained five important articles:

- The new states shall remain forever a part of the United States of America.
- They shall bear the same relation to the confederation as the original states.
- They shall pay their apportionment of the federal debts.
- They shall in their governments uphold republican forms.
- After the year 1800 there shall be neither slavery nor involuntary servitude in any of them.

Notably the map in Jefferson's draft of the committee's report to Congress included two states to be carved out of land ceded by Virginia on its Western side and South of the Ohio River, in what is now Kentucky.

== Demarcating westward expansion of slavery ==
In the late eighteenth century, slavery prevailed throughout much more than half the lands of North America. Jefferson designed the ordinance to establish from end to end of the whole country a north and south line, at which the westward extension of slavery should be stayed by an impassable bound. On exactly the ninth anniversary of the fight at Concord and Lexington, Richard Dobbs Spaight of North Carolina, seconded by Jacob Read of South Carolina, moved to strike out the fifth article concerning the restriction on the expansion of slavery. The votes of seven states were needed to approve Jefferson's clause.

On April 25, 1784 Jefferson wrote to James Madison:

The clause was lost by an individual vote only. Ten states were present. The four eastern states, New York, and Pennsylvania were for the clause; Jersey would have been for it, but there were but two members, one of whom was sick in his chambers. South Carolina, Maryland, and [!] Virginia [!] voted against it. North Carolina was divided, as would have been Virginia, had not one of its delegates been sick in bed.

The absent Virginian was James Monroe, who left no evidence of his intention. For North Carolina the vote of Spaight was neutralized by Williamson. Six States against three, sixteen men against seven strove to stop the spread of slavery. Jefferson denounced this outcome all his life. George Wythe and he, as commissioners to codify the laws of Virginia, had provided for gradual emancipation. When, in 1785, the legislature refused to consider the proposal, Jefferson wrote: "We must hope that an overruling Providence is preparing the deliverance of these our suffering brethren." In 1786, narrating the loss of the clause against slavery in the ordinance of 1784, he said: "The voice of a single individual would have prevented this abominable crime; heaven will not always be silent; the friends to the rights of human nature will in the end prevail."

The ordinance passed without the fifth clause despite Jefferson's wishes, and was in force for three years. The ordinance was further augmented with the Land Ordinance of 1785, and superseded by the Northwest Ordinance of 1787. This latter ordinance provided for civil liberties and public education within new territories that would be created north and west of the Ohio river, and banned slavery therein. It was the first U.S. federal legislation to restrict the expansion of slavery.

== Jefferson's reflections on the ordinance ==
To the friends who visited him in the last period of his life, he delighted to renew these aspirations of his earlier years. In a letter written just 45 days before his death, he refers to the ordinance of 1784, saying: "My sentiments have been forty years before the public: although I shall not live to see them consummated, they will not die with me; but, living or dying, they will ever be in my most fervent prayer."

== See also ==
- Thomas Jefferson and slavery
- Northwest Ordinance

== Sources ==
- George Bancroft History of the Formation of the Constitution of the United States of America, Volume 2, (New York, D. Appleton and Company, 1885) p. 157–158
