= Refugee Tract =

Coordinates: 39°56′29″N 82°48′35″W

The Refugee Tract is an area of land in Ohio, United States granted to people from British Canada who left home before July 4, 1776, stayed in the US until November 25, 1783, continuously, and aided the cause of the American Revolutionary War.

== Location ==
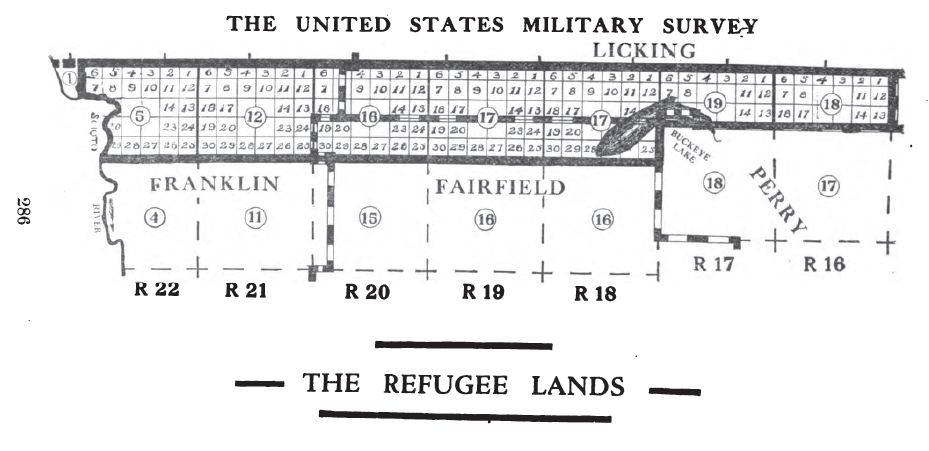
Size and Shape of the Refugee Tract

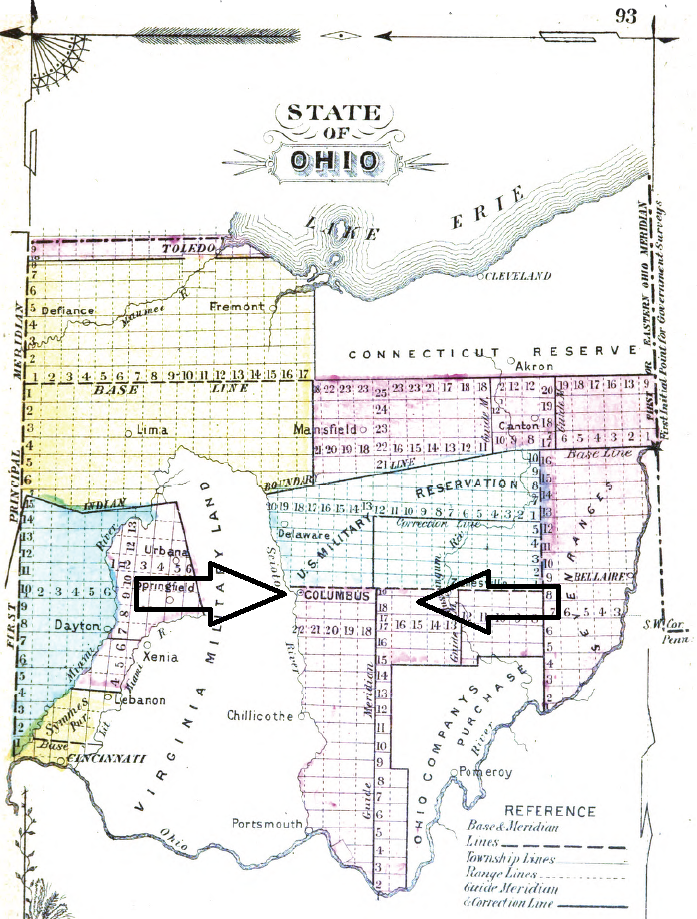
Refugee Tract lies between the arrows

The Refugee Tract of 103,527 acres (418.96 km^{2}) is located in parts of Franklin, Fairfield, Licking and Perry counties in Ohio. It extends for 42 miles (68 km) eastward from the Scioto River along the south line of the United States Military District. For the first 30 miles (48 km) it is four and one half miles wide, and for the easternmost twelve miles (19 km) it is 3 miles (4.8 km) wide.

== History ==
During the American Revolutionary War, there were certain men of Canada and Nova Scotia, who sympathized with, and rendered aid to the United States, some of them joining the American Army. For this lack of loyalty to the Crown of Great Britain, that government confiscated their possessions. For their co-operation with the colonists in their struggle for independence, the government of the United States granted this strip of land to them.

In 1783 and 1785, the Congress promised to compensate the Canadians with land as soon as it was possible to do so. The Land Ordinance of 1785 reserved "three townships adjacent to Lake Erie" for their use. This land belonged to Connecticut, and so was not theirs to promise. In 1798, Congress published advertisements in newspapers inviting those with claims to file an account within two years. The Secretaries of the Treasury and War examined the testimonies to determine the quantity of land each should receive. Acts of February 18, 1801 and April 23, 1812 named a total of 67 claimants to receive 58,080 acres (235.0 km^{2}), in the amounts of 2240, 1280, 960, 640, 320, and 160 acres (0.65 km^{2}). The claimants' land was selected by drawing lots. An act of April 29, 1816 authorized the United States General Land Office in Chillicothe to sell the unclaimed 45,477 acres (184.04 km^{2}) as Congress Lands. Several men who missed the deadline for claiming land were compensated with land in other parts of the country in the 1820s and 1830s.

In Columbus, the Refugee Grant lies approximately between Fifth Avenue on the north and Refugee Road on the south. The Ohio Statehouse and most downtown office buildings are located within the tract.

== Legacy ==
Refugee Road in Columbus is named after the tract. This road continues into Fairfield County and runs along the southern border of the tract.

In Licking County, a different parallel road also named Refugee Road runs along the northern border of the tract.

A plaque affixed to the LeVeque Tower memorializes the tract.

Truro Township, settled by the Canadian Taylor family, was named after Truro, Nova Scotia.

== Claimants ==
Grant (acres)	Claimants
2240	Martha Walker, Widow of Thomas Walker, John Edgar, P. Francis Cazeau, John Allen, Seth Harding, Samuel Rogers, Heirs of James Boyd
1280	Jonathan Eddy, Col. James Livingston, Parker Clark, Heirs of John Dodge
960	Thomas Faulkner, Edward Faulkner, David Gay, Martin Brooks, Lt. Col. Bradford, Noah Miller, Joshua Lamb, Atwood Fales, Charlotte Hazen, Widow of Moses Hazen, Chloe Shannon, Heir to Obadiah Ayer, Heirs of Elijah Ayer, Heirs of Israel Ruland, Heirs of Nataniel Reynolds, Heirs of Edward Antill, Joshua Sprague, John Starr, William How, Ebenezer Gardner, Lewis F. Delesdernier, John McGown, Jonas C. Minot, Heirs of Simeon Chester
640	Jacob Vander Heyden, John Livingston, James Crawford, Isaac Danks, Maj. B. von Heer, Benjamin Thompson, Joseph Bindon, Joseph Levittre, Lt. William Maxwell, John D. Mercier, James Price, Seth Noble, Martha Bogart Heir of Abraham Bogart, John Halsted, Robert Sharp, John Fulton, John Morrison
320	James Sprague, David Dickey, John Taylor, Heirs of Gilbert Seamans, Heirs of Anthony Burk, Elijah Ayer Jr., David Jenks, Ambrose Cole, James Cole, Adam Johnson, Heirs of Col. Jeremiah Duggan, Daniel Earl Jr., John Paskell, Edward Chinn, Joseph Cone, John Torreyre
160	Samuel Fales

== See also ==
- Canadian and Nova Scotia Refugee Tract
- Historic regions of the United States
- Ohio Lands
