= Samuel Hildreth (American Revolution) =

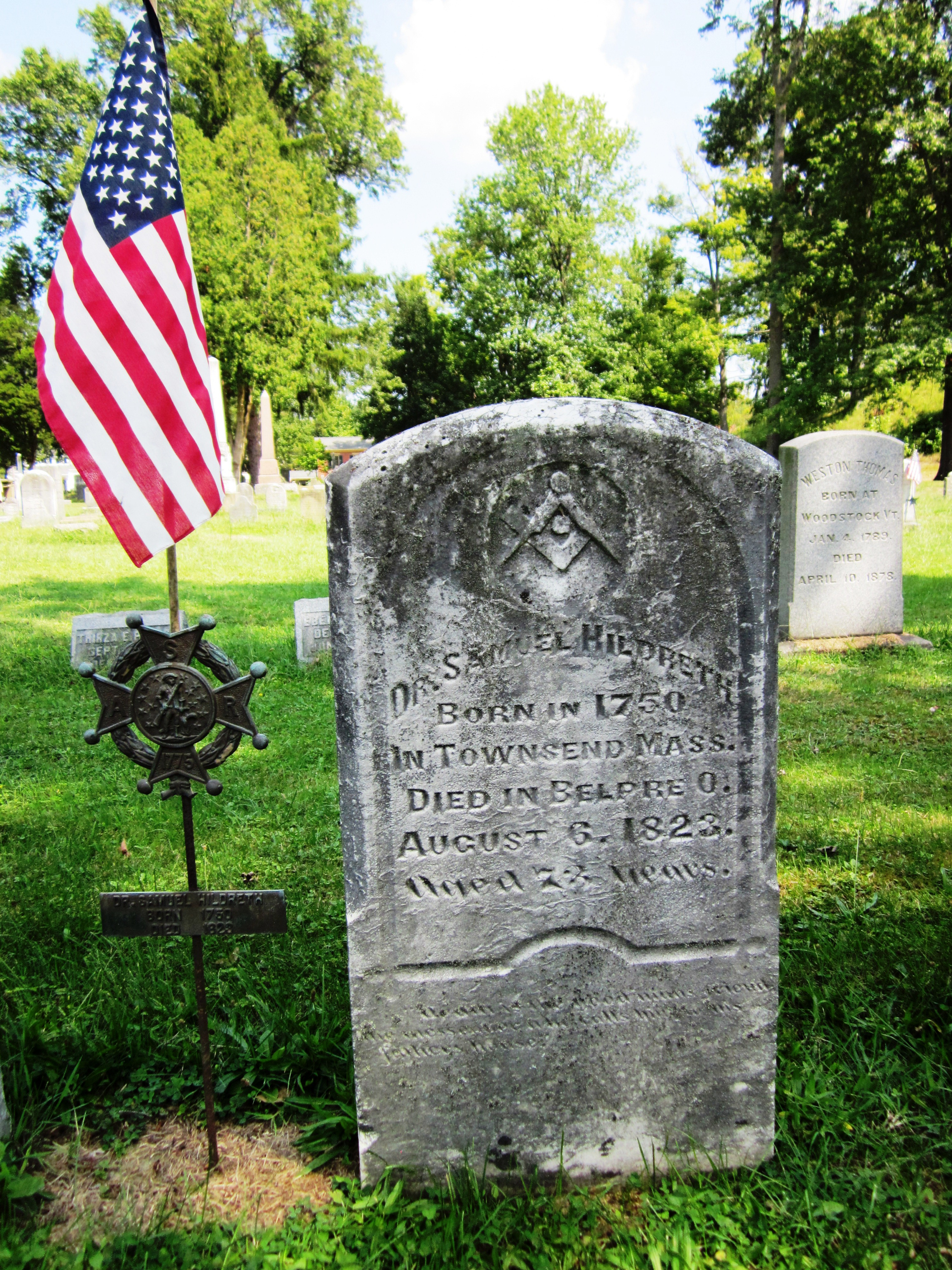
- Samuel Hildreth marker at Mound Cemetery, Marietta, Ohio
- Born: 1750; Townsend, Massachusetts
- Died: August 6, 1823 (aged 72–73); Belpre, Ohio
- Burial place: Mound Cemetery (Marietta, Ohio)
- Relatives: Samuel Prescott Hildreth (son)
- Military career
- Allegiance: United States of America
- Branch: Massachusetts militia, Massachusetts naval privateer
- Rank: surgeon
- Conflicts: American Revolutionary War

Samuel Hildreth (1750–1823) was a surgeon in the Massachusetts militia and aboard Massachusetts naval privateers during the American Revolutionary War, and was subsequently a prisoner-of-war.

== Life ==
Samuel Hildreth was born in 1750 in on a farm in Townsend, Massachusetts. At the age of twenty he took the occupation of cooper in order to earn enough to study medicine. In 1774 he began his studies under Dr. John Brown of Wilmington in Essex County. Two years later, he set up a practice in Methuen. In May 1776 he married Abagail Bodwell.

In October 1777, he went as a surgeon, with the volunteers mustered to confront General John Burgoyne at Saratoga, where he also treated Hessian soldiers. He then resumed his medical practice. He then took position as ship's surgeon on a privateer out of Marblehead. In 1780, he shipped out of Salem, but was captured by the British and taken with other prisoners to Quebec. The following spring, they were sent to Trois-Rivières. Here he learned French, and was prevailed upon to treat the resident. He soon established a medical practice serving the surrounding settlements as well.

Impatient with their captivity, the prisoners decided to escape. Although he considered the plan ill-advised, he went with them. They were soon captured and sent to close confinement in Montreal. He and others came down with jail fever but recovered due to the ministrations of the Sisters of Charity. In November 1782, the prisoners were released and sailed for Boston.

After the war, he became a shareholder in the Ohio Company of Associates, though he did not move from Massachusetts to the Ohio Country.

His son Samuel Prescott Hildreth relocated to Marietta, Ohio, and was a pioneer physician, scientist, and historian of the early days of Ohio and the Northwest Territory. Samuel Hildreth died while visiting his son in Ohio during 1823 and was buried at Mound Cemetery in Marietta, along with many other Revolutionary War soldiers and sailors. His son was later buried nearby within Mound Cemetery.

Mound Cemetery reportedly contains the largest number of Revolutionary War officers buried in one location. Samuel Hildreth is one of thirty-seven Revolutionary War veterans at the cemetery noted by the Washington County Historical Society.

== Bibliography ==
- Conard, Howard L.: History of Milwaukee from Its First Settlement to the Year 1895, Volume II, American Biographical Publishing Company (1896).
- Hawley, Owen: Mound Cemetery, Marietta, Ohio, Washington County Historical Society, Marietta, Ohio (1996).
- Hildreth, Samuel Prescott (1840). Genealogical and Biographical Sketches of the Hildreth Family: From the Year 1652 Down to the Year 1840.
- Ohio Historical Quarterly, Volume 64, Ohio Historical Society (1955).
