= Northwest Ordinance =

1787 American organic legislation creating Northwest Territory

Northwest Territory (1787)

The Northwest Ordinance (formally An Ordinance for the Government of the Territory of the United States, North-West of the River Ohio and also known as the Ordinance of 1787), enacted July 13, 1787, was an organic act of the Congress of the Confederation of the United States. It created the Northwest Territory, the new nation's first organized incorporated territories between British North America and the Great Lakes to the north and the Ohio River to the south. The upper Mississippi River formed the territory's western boundary. Pennsylvania was the eastern boundary.

In the 1783 Treaty of Paris, which formally ended the American Revolutionary War, Great Britain ceded the region to the United States. However, the Confederation Congress faced numerous problems gaining control of the land such as the unsanctioned movement of American settlers into the Ohio Valley; violent resistance from the region's indigenous peoples; the continued presence of British outposts in the region and an empty U.S. treasury. The ordinance supplemented and in some respects superseded the Land Ordinance of 1784, which declared that states would one day be formed within the region, and the Land Ordinance of 1785, which described how the Confederation Congress would sell the land to private citizens. Designed to serve as a plan for the development and settlement of the region, the 1787 ordinance lacked a strong central government to implement it. That need was addressed shortly with the formation of the U.S. federal government in 1789. The First Congress reaffirmed the 1787 ordinance and, with slight modifications, renewed it with the Northwest Ordinance of 1789.

Considered one of the most important legislative acts of the Confederation Congress, it established the precedent by which the federal government would be sovereign and expand westward with the admission of new states, rather than with the expansion of existing states and their established sovereignty under the Articles of Confederation. It also set legislative precedent with regard to American public domain lands. The U.S. Supreme Court recognized the authority of the Northwest Ordinance of 1789 within the applicable Northwest Territory as constitutional in Strader v. Graham, but it did not extend the ordinance to cover the respective states once they were admitted to the Union.

The prohibition of slavery in the territory had the practical effect of establishing the Ohio River as the geographic divide between slave states and free states from the Appalachian Mountains to the Mississippi River, an extension of the Mason–Dixon line. It also helped set the stage for later federal political conflicts over slavery during the 19th century until the American Civil War.

== Background ==
The territory was acquired by Great Britain from France after the former's victory in the Seven Years' War and during the 1763 Treaty of Paris. Britain took over the Ohio Country, as its eastern portion was known, but a few months later, King George III forbade all settlements in the region by the Royal Proclamation of 1763. The Crown tried to restrict the settlement of the Thirteen Colonies to the area between the Appalachians and the Atlantic Ocean, which raised colonial tensions among those who wanted to move west. In 1774, Britain annexed the region to its Province of Quebec. With the Patriots' victory in the American Revolutionary War and the signing of the 1783 Treaty of Paris, the United States claimed the territory as well as the areas south of Ohio. The territories were subject to overlapping and conflicting claims of the states of Massachusetts, Connecticut, New York, and Virginia dating from their colonial past. The British were active in some of the border areas until after the Louisiana Purchase and the War of 1812.

The region had long been desired for expansion by American settlers. The states were encouraged to settle their claims by the U.S. federal government's de facto opening of the area to settlement after the defeat of Great Britain. In 1784, Thomas Jefferson, as delegate from Virginia, proposed for the states to relinquish their particular claims to all territory west of the Appalachians and for the area to be divided into new states of the Union. Jefferson's proposal to create a federal domain through state cessions of western lands was derived from earlier proposals dating back to 1776 and debates about the Articles of Confederation. Jefferson proposed creating ten roughly rectangular states from the territory, and suggested names for the new states: Cherronesus, Sylvania, Assenisipia, Illinoia, Metropotamia, Polypotamia, Pelisipia, Washington, Michigania and Saratoga. The Congress of the Confederation modified the proposal and passed it as the Land Ordinance of 1784, which established the example that would become the basis for the Northwest Ordinance three years later.

The 1784 ordinance was criticized by George Washington in 1785 and James Monroe in 1786. Monroe convinced Congress to reconsider the proposed state boundaries; a review committee recommended repealing that part of the ordinance. Other politicians questioned the 1784 ordinance's plan for organizing governments in new states and worried that the new states' relatively small sizes would undermine the original states' power in Congress. Other events such as the reluctance of states south of the Ohio River to cede their western claims resulted in a narrowed geographic focus.

When it was passed in New York in 1787, the Northwest Ordinance showed the influence of Jefferson. It called for dividing the territory into gridded townships so that once the lands were surveyed, they could be sold to individuals and speculative land companies. That would provide both a new source of federal government revenue and an orderly pattern for future settlement.

== Effects ==
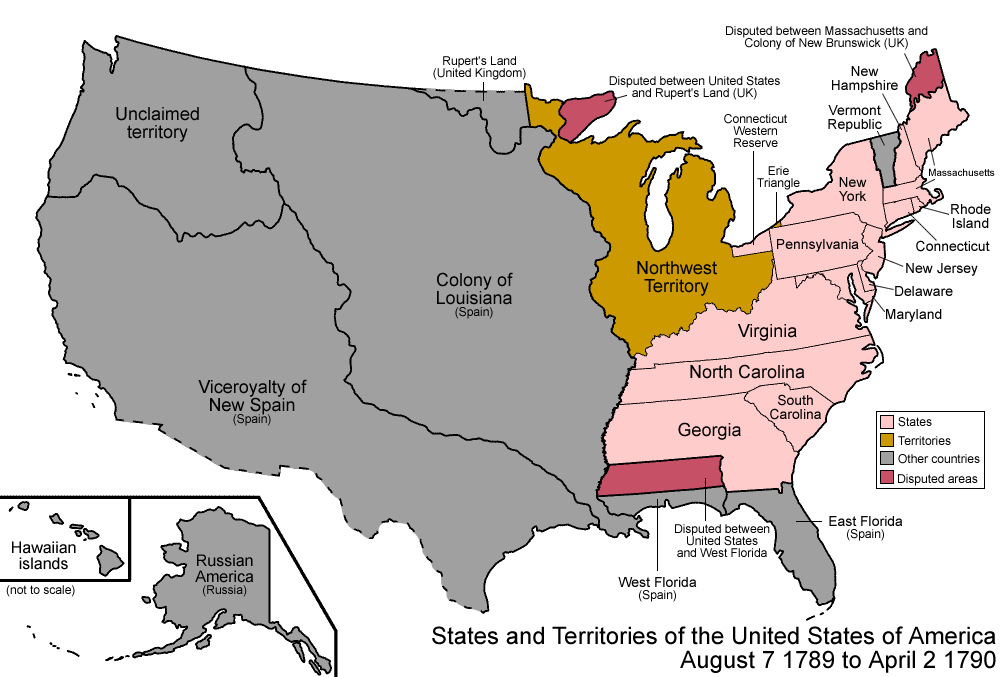
Map of territories of the United States as it was on August 7, 1789, when the Northwest Territory was organized

=== Land ownership ===
The Northwest Ordinance of 1787 established the concept of fee simple ownership by which ownership was in perpetuity, with unlimited power to sell or give it away. That was called the "first guarantee of freedom of contract in the United States."

=== Abolition and transfer of state claims ===
Passage of the ordinance, which ceded all unsettled lands to the federal government and established the public domain, followed the relinquishing of all such claims over the territory by the states. The territories were to be administered directly by Congress, with the intent of their eventual admission as newly created states. The legislation was revolutionary in that it established the precedent for new lands to be administered by the central government, albeit temporarily, rather than under the jurisdiction of the individually-sovereign original states, as under the Articles of Confederation. The legislation also broke colonial precedent by defining future use of the natural navigation, transportation and communication routes. It did so in a way that anticipated future acquisitions beyond the Northwest Territories and established federal policy. Article 4 stated: "The navigable waters leading into the Mississippi and St. Lawrence, and the carrying places between the same, shall be common highways and forever free, as well to the inhabitants of the said territory as to the citizens of the United States, and those of any other States that may be admitted into the confederacy, without any tax, impost, or duty therefor."

=== Admission of new states ===
The most significant intended purpose of the legislation was its mandate for the creation of new states from the region. It provided that at least three but not more than five states would be established in the territory and that once such a state achieved a population of 60,000, it would be admitted into representation in the Continental Congress on an equal footing with the original thirteen states. The first state created from the Northwest Territory was Ohio in 1803, and the remaining territory was renamed Indiana Territory. The other four states were Indiana, Illinois, Michigan, and Wisconsin. A portion (about a third) of what later became Minnesota was also part of the territory.

=== Education ===
The 1787 ordinance encouraged education, stipulating: "Religion, morality and knowledge being necessary to good government and the happiness of mankind, schools and the means of education shall forever be encouraged." This built on the 1785 ordinance, which had specified that each township should set aside land that would be rented out to support public schools. In 1786, Manasseh Cutler became interested in the settlement of western lands by American pioneers to the Northwest Territory. The following year, as agent of the Ohio Company of Associates, which he had been involved in creating, he organized a contract with Congress whereby his associates, former soldiers of the Revolutionary War, might purchase 1,500,000 acres (610,000 ha) of land at the mouth of the Muskingum River with their Certificate of Indebtedness. Cutler also took a leading part in drafting the Ordinance of 1787 for the government of the Northwest Territory, which was finally presented to Congress by Massachusetts delegate Nathan Dane. For the smooth passage of the Northwest Ordinance, Cutler bribed key congressmen by making them partners in his land company. By changing the office of provisional governor from being elected to appointed, Cutler was able to offer the position to the president of Congress, Arthur St. Clair.

In 1797, settlers from Marietta traveled upstream via the Hocking River to establish a location for the school and chose Athens for its location directly between Chillicothe and Marietta. Originally named in 1802 as the American Western University, the school never opened. Instead, Ohio University was formally established on February 18, 1804, when its charter was approved by the Ohio General Assembly. Its establishment came 11 months after Ohio was admitted to the Union. The first three students enrolled in 1809. Ohio University graduated two students with bachelor's degrees in 1815.

=== Establishment of territorial government ===
While the population of free, male inhabitants of a territory was less than 5,000, there would be a limited form of government: a governor, a secretary, and three judges, all being appointed by Congress. The governor, appointed for a three-year term and given a "freehold estate therein, in one thousand acres of land," would be the commander-in-chief of the militia, appoint magistrates and other civil officers, and help create and publish laws. The secretary, appointed for a four-year term and given a similar freehold estate as the governor but of five hundred acres, would be in charge of keeping and preserving the acts and laws passed by the territorial legislatures, keep the public records of the district, and transmit authentic copies of such acts and proceedings every six months to the secretary of the Continental Congress. Three judges, who would be appointed indefinitely "during good behaviour" and be given the same freehold as the secretary, would be in charge of helping the governor create and pass acts and laws and in making official court rulings.

Once the population of a territory reached 5,000 free, male inhabitants, it would receive the authority to elect representatives from counties or townships to a territorial general assembly. For every 500 free males, there would be one representative until there were 25 representatives. Then, Congress would control the number and proportion of the representatives from that legislature. No male could be a representative unless he was a citizen of the United States for at least three years or lived in the district for three years and owned at least 200 acres of land within the same district. The representatives would serve for a term of two years. If a representative died or was removed from office, a new one would be elected to serve out the remaining time.

=== Establishment of natural rights ===
The natural rights provisions of the ordinance foreshadowed the Bill of Rights, the first ten amendments to the U.S. Constitution. Many of the concepts and guarantees of the Ordinance of 1787 were incorporated in the U.S. Constitution and the Bill of Rights. In the Northwest Territory, various legal and property rights were enshrined, religious tolerance was proclaimed, and since "Religion, morality, and knowledge, being necessary to good government and the happiness of mankind, schools and the means of education shall forever be encouraged." The right of habeas corpus was written into the charter, as were freedom of religion and bans on excessive fines and cruel and unusual punishment. Trial by jury and a ban on ex post facto laws were also rights that were recognized.

=== Prohibition of slavery ===
Article VI of the document stated a tenet that had never before been set forth in any American constitution: that slavery would be prohibited. At the time of its writing, slavery existed in all 13 states.

Art. 6. There shall be neither slavery nor involuntary servitude in the said territory, otherwise than in the punishment of crimes whereof the party shall have been duly convicted: Provided, always, That any person escaping into the same, from whom labor or service is lawfully claimed in any one of the original States, such fugitive may be lawfully reclaimed and conveyed to the person claiming his or her labor or service as aforesaid.

At the time, no one claimed being responsible for this article. Sometime later, Nathan Dane of Massachusetts claimed he wrote it, and Manasseh Cutler told his son Ephraim Cutler that he wrote it. Historian David McCullough discounts Dane's claim because Dane was not a good writer. The language of the ordinance prohibits slavery but also contains a clear fugitive slave clause. An attempt to add limited slavery to the proposed constitution of Ohio in 1802 was defeated after a major effort led by Ephraim Cutler, who represented Marietta, the town founded by the Ohio Company.

Efforts in the 1820s by proponents of slavery to legalize slavery in two of the states (Illinois and Indiana) created from the Northwest Territory failed, but an "indentured servant" law allowed some slaveholders to bring slaves under that status who could not be bought or sold. Southern states voted for the law because they did not want to compete with the territory over tobacco as a commodity crop since it was so labor-intensive that it was grown profitably only with slave labor. Also, slave states' political power would be merely equalized since there were three more slave states than there were free states in 1790.

The Thirteenth Amendment, ratified in 1865, which outlawed slavery throughout the United States, quotes verbatim from Article 6 of the Northwest Ordinance.

=== Effects on Native Americans ===
In two parts, the Northwest Ordinance mentions the Native Americans within the region. One pertains to the demarcation of counties and townships out of lands that the Indians were regarded as having lost or relinquished title:

Section 8. For the prevention of crimes and injuries, the laws to be adopted or made shall have force in all parts of the district, and for the execution of process, criminal and civil, the governor shall make proper divisions thereof; and he shall proceed from time to time as circumstances may require, to lay out the parts of the district in which the Indian titles shall have been extinguished, into counties and townships, subject, however, to such alterations as may thereafter be made by the legislature.

The other describes the preferred relationship with the Indians:

Article III. Religion, morality, and knowledge, being necessary to good government and the happiness of mankind, schools and the means of education shall forever be encouraged. The utmost good faith shall always be observed towards the Indians; their lands and property shall never be taken from them without their consent; and, in their property, rights, and liberty, they shall never be invaded or disturbed, unless in just and lawful wars authorized by Congress; but laws founded in justice and humanity, shall from time to time be made for preventing wrongs being done to them, and for preserving peace and friendship with them.

Many Native Americans in Ohio who were not parties refused to acknowledge treaties signed after the Revolutionary War that ceded lands north of the Ohio River inhabited by them to the United States. In a conflict sometimes known as the Northwest Indian War, Blue Jacket of the Shawnees and Little Turtle of the Miamis formed a confederation to stop white expropriation of the territory. After the Indian confederation killed more than 800 soldiers in two battles, the worst defeats ever suffered by the United States in conflicts with Indigenous nations, U.S. President George Washington assigned General Anthony Wayne command of a new army, which eventually defeated the confederation and allowed European Americans to continue to settle the territory.

== Commemoration ==
In 1907, a plaque commemorating the "first permanent settlement in the territory northwest of the Ohio" and the Northwest Ordinance was placed on the exterior of the Federal Hall National Memorial at the corner of Broad and Nassau Streets in Lower Manhattan. Federal Hall served as the nation's seat of government in 1787, when the Northwest Ordinance was passed into law.
On July 13, 1937, the U.S. Post Office issued a 3-cent commemorative stamp to mark the 150th anniversary of the Northwest Territory as defined by the Ordinance of 1787. The engraving on the stamp depicts a map of the United States at the time between the figures of Manasseh Cutler (left) and Rufus Putnam (right).

== See also ==
- Historic regions of the United States
- Public Land Survey System
- State cessions

== Sources ==
- McCullough, David. "The Pioneers: The Heroic Story of the Settlers who Brought the American Ideal West", New York: Simon & Schuster, 2019, ISBN 978-1501168680.
