= Strader v. Graham =

- Supreme Court of the United States

Decided December, 1850
- Full case name: Jacob Strader, James Gorman, and John Armstrong, Plaintiffs in Error, v. Christopher Graham
- Citations: 51 U.S. 82 (more) 10 How. 82; 13 L. Ed. 337

Court membership
- Chief Justice Roger B. Taney Associate Justices John McLean · James M. Wayne; John Catron · John McKinley; Peter V. Daniel · Samuel Nelson; Levi Woodbury · Robert C. Grier

Case opinions
- Majority: Taney, joined by Wayne, McKinley, Daniel, Nelson, Woodbury, Grier
- Concurrence: McLean
- Concurrence: Catron

Laws applied
- Northwest Ordinance of 1787

Strader v. Graham, 51 U.S. (10 How.) 82 (1851), was a US Supreme Court decision that held that the status of three slaves who went from Kentucky to Indiana and Ohio depended on Kentucky law, rather than Ohio law. The original plaintiff was Christopher Graham, whose three slaves had traveled to Cincinnati, Ohio, aboard a steamboat owned by Jacob Strader and James Gorman and piloted by John Armstrong. The slaves later escaped to Canada. The US Supreme Court recognized the authority of the Northwest Ordinance of 1787 over its applicable territories in Strader v. Graham but did not extend the Northwest Ordinance to cover the states that were later admitted to the Union.

== See also ==
- American slave court cases
- List of United States Supreme Court cases, volume 51
