= Coopersville, Clinton County, New York =

Hamlet in Clinton County, New York

Coordinates: 44°56′35″N 73°24′28″W

Coopersville (formerly, Corbeau, Cooperville and Moore's Mills) is a hamlet in Clinton County, New York, United States. Coopersville lies at an elevation of 112 feet (34 m).

Most of the first settlers of this area were refugees from Canada who either did not support the British during the American Revolution, or actually took up arms against the British. Many of these had been soldiers in the French army from "The Old French War", (The French and Indian War).

== See also ==
- Canadian and Nova Scotia Refugee Tract
