= Nathan Dane =

American politician

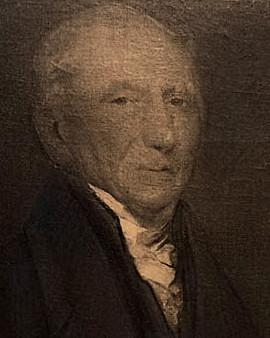

Member of the Massachusetts Senate
- In office 1790 – 1791; 1794 – 1797

Delegate from Massachusetts to the Congress of the Confederation
- In office 1785 – 1788

Member of the Massachusetts House of Representatives from Beverly
- In office 1782 – 1785

Personal details
- Born: December 29, 1752 Ipswich, Massachusetts
- Died: February 15, 1835 (aged 82) Beverly, Massachusetts
- Resting place: Central Cemetery, Beverly
- Spouse: Mary Brown
- Children: 0
- Education: Harvard College
- Profession: Lawyer, Statesman

Nathan Dane (December 29, 1752 – February 15, 1835) was an American lawyer and statesman who represented Massachusetts in the Continental Congress from 1785 through 1788. Dane helped formulate the Northwest Ordinance while in Congress, and introduced an amendment to the ordinance prohibiting slavery in the Northwest Territory.

During his career, he served in both the Massachusetts House of Representatives and the Massachusetts Senate. He also wrote a multi-volume treatise that covered the entire subject of American law, which enabled him to help fund the development of Harvard Law School.

== Early life and education ==
Dane was born at Ipswich in Essex County, Massachusetts. His father Daniel Dane was a farmer, and his mother's name was Abigail. Ancestor John Dane Sr. had immigrated to Massachusetts from England (not Denmark) in 1636.

Dane worked on the family farm in Ipswich until he turned twenty. Moving on to college at Harvard, his major interest was in mathematics, and he graduated in 1778. Then he taught school and read for the law. In 1779 he married Mary Brown (they would have no children).

Dane was admitted to the bar and set up a legal practice in Beverly in 1782. That same year, he entered elective office in the Massachusetts House of Representatives, where he served until 1785. Dane's hearing was poor throughout his career, and steadily got worse.

== Continental Congress ==
In 1785, Dane became a Massachusetts delegate to the Continental Congress, where he helped draft the Northwest Ordinance, which was enacted on July 13, 1787. The Ordinance encouraged American settlers into the Northwest Territory and formed the basis of the constitutions of the five states there: Ohio, Indiana, Illinois, Michigan and Wisconsin. The Ordinance also banned slavery in the Northwest Territory. Dane's amendment banning slavery was offered at the last minute, and was quickly accepted without much discussion, to the surprise of Dane himself, who "had no idea the States would agree to the sixth article, prohibiting slavery...."

In February 1787, Dane proposed a resolution authorizing the Philadelphia Convention to amend the Articles of Confederation, and that resolution was adopted. Out of that Philadelphia Convention came the proposed United States Constitution. But Dane had reservations about supporting its ratification. In July 1788, he finally wrote a pivotal letter of support to Melancton Smith of New York. Dane said that he feared violence and social upheaval if the Constitution were not ratified, and he supported ratification with the understanding that there would be later amendments, which eventually came to be known as the United States Bill of Rights.

== Later career ==
Dane was an unsuccessful candidate for the United States Senate in 1788 and 1790. He was later elected to the Massachusetts State Senate from 1790 to 1791 and again from 1794 to 1797. In 1794 he served on a commission that reviewed and codified the laws of Massachusetts.

Later, while practicing law, he remained an active reformer, on behalf of vocational education and humane treatment of prisoners. He also helped establish the American Temperance Society to discourage use and abuse of alcoholic beverages.

He was a member of the Federalist Party and its Essex Junto. The Massachusetts legislature appointed him as a delegate to the Hartford Convention during the War of 1812, which damaged his reputation, although Dane saw himself as a voice of moderation at the Convention and maintained that he did not have any secessionist intentions: "Someone must go to prevent mischief," he said.

Dane was elected a member of the American Antiquarian Society in 1816.

=== "Father of American Jurisprudence" ===
By 1820, Dane was almost totally deaf, but he continued working long hours in his library, writing two major legal treatises. The first of these was published in 1823, titled A General Abridgement and Digest of American Law. Its eight volumes were supplemented by a ninth in 1829. The Abridgment was very successful, and was the "first systematic treatise covering the entire field of American law." It became a standard work, and every lawyer of distinction bought a copy.

Dane used the substantial proceeds from the Abridgement to provide an endowment for a law school at Harvard University, specifying that the first Dane Professorship of Law would go to his old friend Joseph Story. For a while, Harvard Law School was called "Dane Law School."

On account of the Abridgement and his generosity to the law school at Harvard, together with his co-authorship of the Northwest Ordinance, Dane has been called the "Father of American Jurisprudence." The Abridgment was often cited in later years; for example, when abolitionist Wendell Phillips argued against abolitionist Lysander Spooner's notion that judges have an obligation to disregard any law that the judges deem wrong, Philips cited the following legal maxim in which Dane assigned that obligation to legislators instead of judges:

Municipal or civil law ... is the rule of municipal or civil conduct, prescribed by the superior power in the state commanding what the legislature deems right, and prohibiting what it deems wrong.

Dane's other treatise was titled a Moral and Political Survey of America. It has been described as "arguably the first broad-based national history from English and Spanish colonization through the War of Independence".

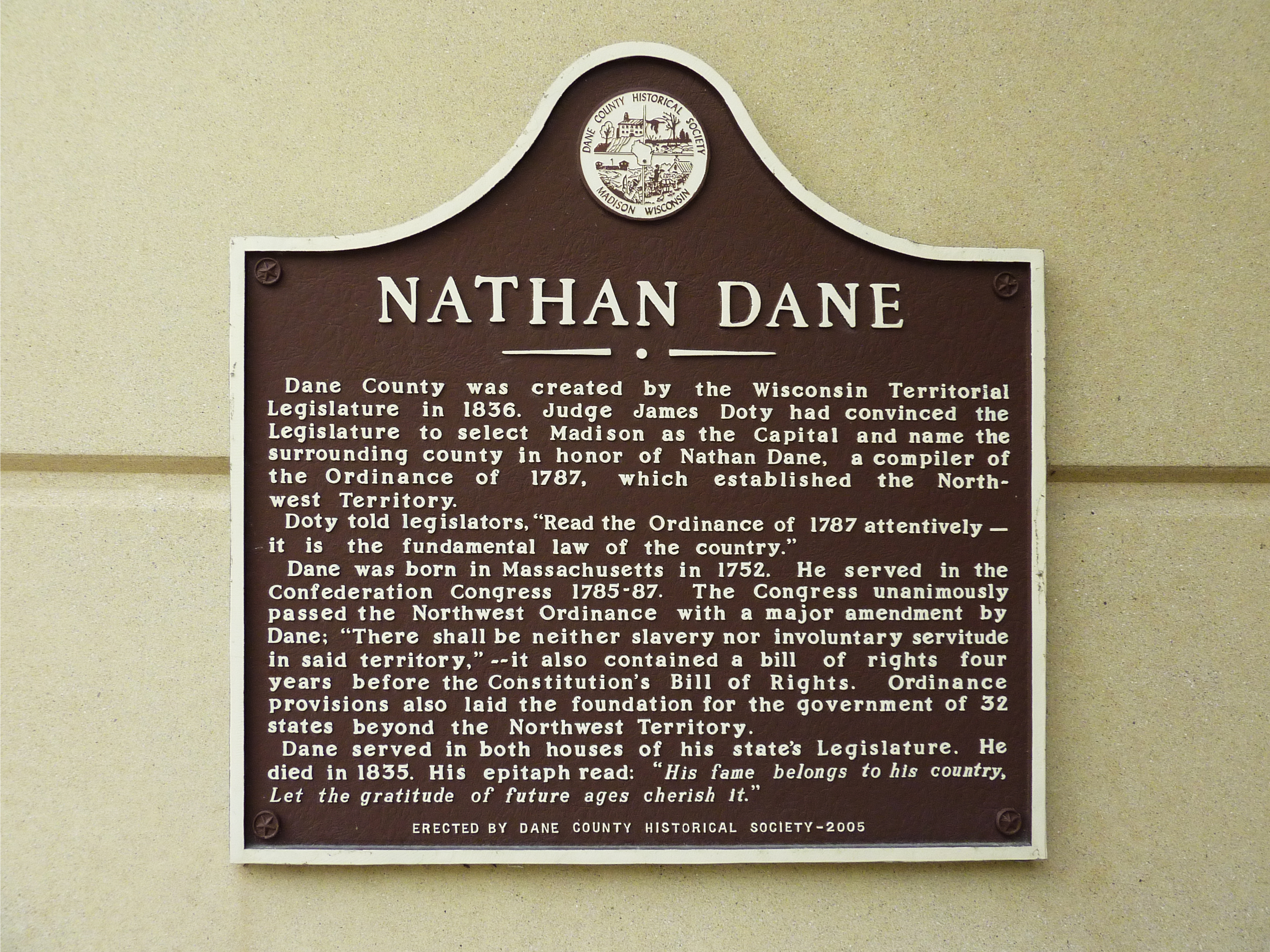
Marker erected by the Dane County Historical Society

== Death and posthumous honors ==
Dane died at home in Beverly and was buried in the Central Cemetery there. Dane Street in Beverly borders the cemetery. Dane County, Wisconsin, which was formed in 1836, was named in his honor. Within Dane County, there is a Town of Dane, and within the Town of Dane is a village called Dane, Wisconsin.

In 2015 Massachusetts Governor Charlie Baker and Beverly Mayor Michael P. Cahill, in accordance with the anniversary of the passage of the Northwest Ordinance of 1787, declared July 13–19 "Nathan Dane Week" in the state of Massachusetts and the City of Beverly, Massachusetts. The effort was spearheaded by Lance Daly, founder of the Beverly Heritage Project, "whose coordinated effort resulted in official proclamations from five state governors, eight historical societies from six states and a smattering of representatives calling for their states to honor Nathan Dane's impact on history." In honor of "Nathan Dane Week," Indiana Governor Mike Pence issued a proclamation making Dane an honorary Hoosier.

== Writings ==
General Abridgement and Digest of American Law, with Occasional Notes and Comments:

Volume 1 (1824) via Google Books

Volume 2 (1824) via Google Books

Volume 3 (1824) via Google Books

Volume 4 (1824) via Google Books

Volume 5 (1824) via Google Books

Volume 6 (1824) via Google Books

Volume 7 (1824) via Google Books

Volume 8 (1824) via Google Books

Volume 9 (1829) via Google Books
