= Nathaniel Saltonstall (American Revolution) =

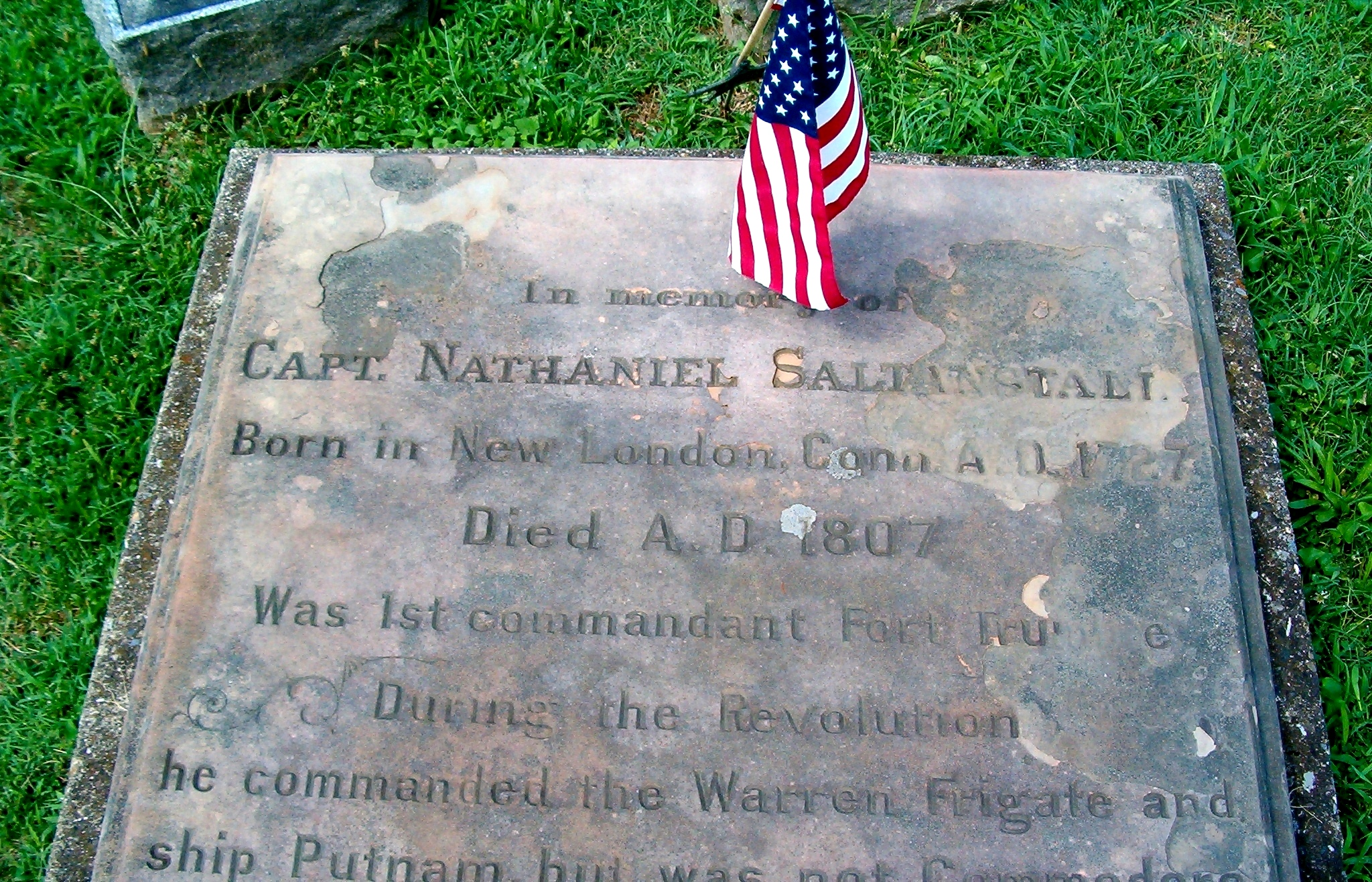
- Nathaniel Saltonstall marker in Marietta, Ohio
- Born: 1727; New London, Connecticut
- Died: August 1807 (aged 79–80); Marietta, Ohio
- Burial place: Mound Cemetery (Marietta, Ohio)
- Military career
- Allegiance: United States of America
- Branch: Connecticut militia, Connecticut naval privateer
- Rank: Captain
- Conflicts: American Revolutionary War

Nathaniel Saltonstall (1727–1807) was a Connecticut militiaman and a captain of Connecticut naval privateer ships during the American Revolutionary War (not to be confused with another Connecticut naval officer with the same surname, Dudley Saltonstall).

Nathaniel Saltonstall was in command of the "old fort" (better known as Fort Trumbull) at New London, Connecticut at the start of the war, and subsequently served as a naval commander in service of Nathaniel Shaw of New London. Saltonstall served as first lieutenant on the first voyage of the 24-gun ship General Putnam; he was commissioned as captain for the second voyage of the Putnam:

You are to go on board our ship Putnam armed and fitted in a warlike manner for a cruise against the enemies of the Independent States of America as per your commission and instructions from the President of Congress and whose instructions you are to strictly obey.

Saltonstall captured several prizes while captain of the Putnam. He additionally served as captain of the ship Le Despencer. Later in the war, Captain Saltonstall led volunteer soldiers during the Battle of Groton Heights. Later in life, Nathaniel Saltonstall moved to Marietta, Ohio, where he died on August 1, 1807. He is buried at Mound Cemetery in Marietta, along with Commodore Abraham Whipple of the Continental Navy and many other American Revolutionary War soldiers and pioneers.

Lake Saltonstall and Saltonstall Mountain in Branford, Connecticut are named in his honor.

== Bibliography ==
- Hawley, Owen: Mound Cemetery, Marietta, Ohio, Washington County Historical Society, Marietta, Ohio (1996).
- Hinman, Royal R.: A Historical Collection of the Part Sustained by Connecticut during the War of the Revolution, E. Gleason, Hartford, Connecticut (1842).
- McManemin, John A.: Captains of the Privateers during the Revolutionary War, Ho-Ho-Kus Pub. Co. (1985).
- Rogers, Ernest E.: Connecticut's Naval Office at New London during the War of the American Revolution, Heritage Books, Westminster, Maryland (2008). Originally published by New London County Historical Society in 1933.
- Sturtevant, Lynne: A Guide to Historic Marietta, Ohio, The History Press, Charleston, South Carolina (2011).
