= Ohio Company of Associates =

18th-century land company in Ohio

Map of Ohio showing the boundaries of the Ohio Company Purchase on the lower right.

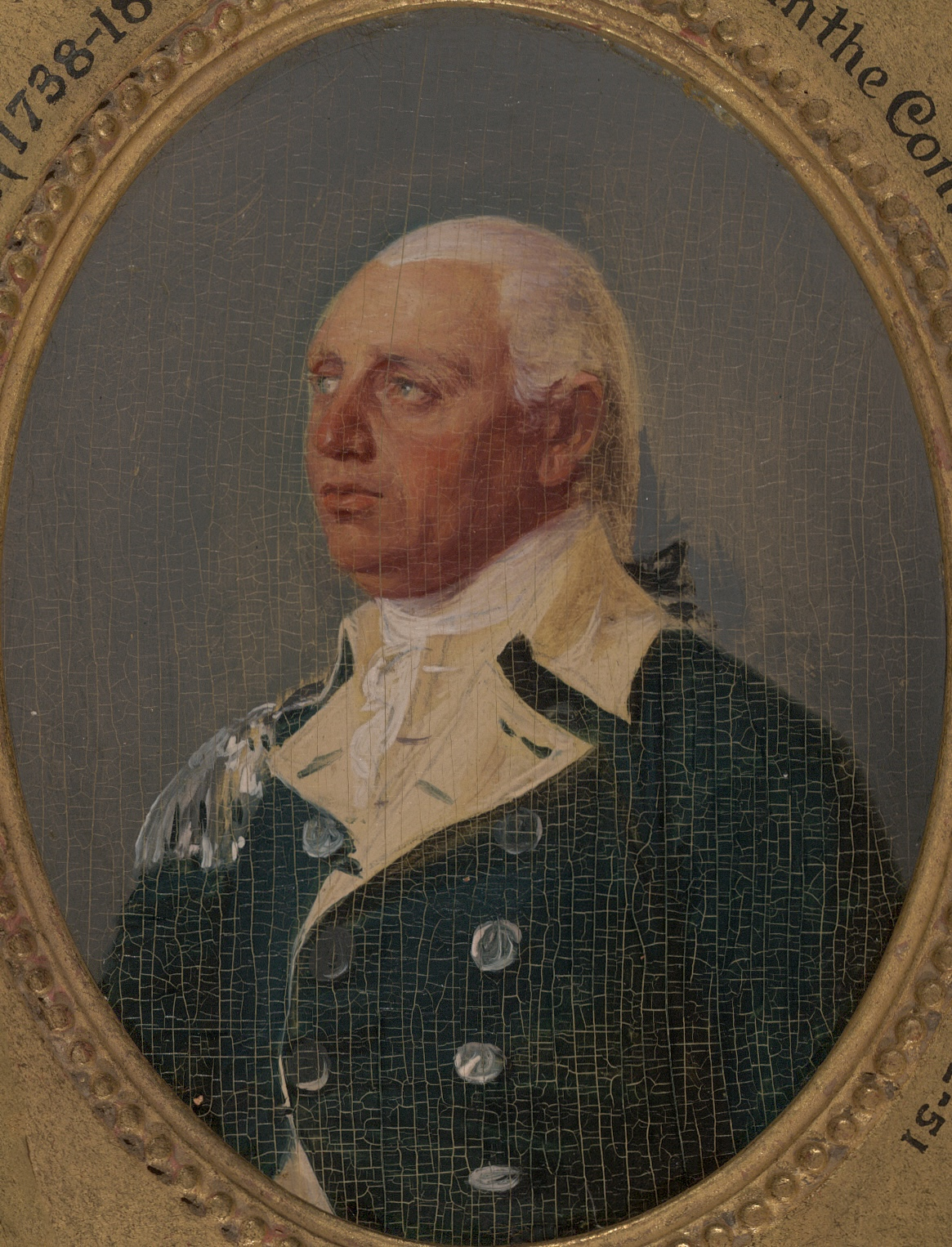
Rufus Putnam

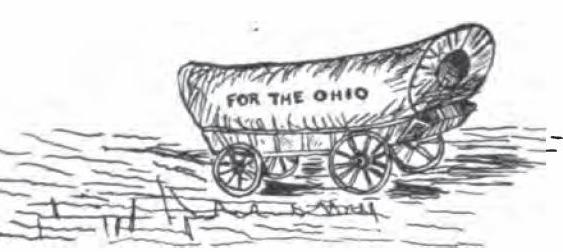
20th-century artist’s impression of a pioneer wagon bound for the Ohio country in the late 1700s.

The Ohio Company of Associates, also known as the Ohio Company, was a land company whose members are today credited with becoming the first non-Native American group to permanently settle west of the Allegheny mountains. In 1788, they established Marietta, Ohio, as the first permanent settlement of the new United States in the newly organized Northwest Territory.

== Creation of the company ==
The company was formed between March 1 and March 3, 1786, by Rufus Putnam, Benjamin Tupper, Samuel Holden Parsons and Manasseh Cutler in Boston, Massachusetts. They had met at The Bunch-of-Grapes tavern, located on King Street, to discuss the settlement of the territory around the Ohio River. On March 8, 1787, Parsons, Putnam, and Cutler were chosen as directors, and Winthrop Sargent was elected secretary. On August 30, 1787, James Mitchell Varnum was elected as a director, and Richard Platt as treasurer. Later directors included Griffin Greene upon the death of Varnum, and Robert Oliver upon the death of Parsons.

== Negotiations with the government ==
Cutler was sent to New York to negotiate with the Congress of the Confederation to help the company secure a claim on a portion of the land. While there, Cutler aligned himself with William Duer, secretary of the U.S. Treasury Board. Duer and his associates formed a group of New York speculators who were determined to see settlement of the area west of the Appalachians. At this time, Congress desperately needed revenue. The prospect of sales of land helped settle controversy and secure the incorporation in the Northwest Ordinance of the paragraphs that prohibited slavery, provided for land for public education and for the support of the ministry.

The Ohio Company's purchase was enabled first by the passage on July 13, 1787, of the "Ordinance for the Government of the Territory of the United States Northwest of the River Ohio," commonly known as the Northwest Ordinance, and second, by the Act of October 23, 1787, which authorized Congress to make contracts of public lands for not less than one million acres. On October 27, 1787, the Treasury Board under Secretary William Duer finalized the Ohio Company's purchase. Their first contract was for the Ohio Company to purchase 1,500,000 acres (6,000 km²) of land at the confluence of the Ohio and Muskingum rivers, from a point near the site of present-day Marietta, to a point nearly opposite present-day Huntington, West Virginia, for a payment of $1 million in government securities, then worth about 12¢ specie to the dollar. The contract also provided that one section of land in every township be devoted to the maintenance of public schools, another section be set apart for religious uses, and two entire townships be reserved for a university.

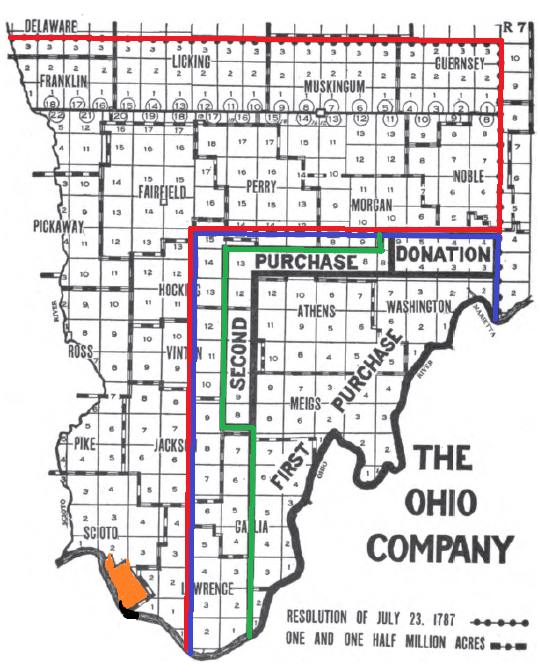
The proposed purchase by the Scioto Company is shown in red. The proposed purchase of 1,500,000 acres (6,100 km^{2}) by the Ohio Company is in blue. The final dimensions of the Ohio Company is in green, including the First Purchase, Second Purchase, and Donation Tract.

The second contract was an option to buy all the land between the Ohio and the Scioto rivers and the western boundary line of the Ohio Company's tract, extending north of the tenth survey township from the Ohio, this tract being preempted by Manasseh Cutler and Winthrop Sargent for themselves and others for the Scioto Company. Cutler's original intent was to buy only about 1,500,000 acres (6,000 km²) for the Ohio Company, but on the July 27, Congress authorized a grant of about 5,000,000 acres (20,000 km²) of land for $3,500,000; a reduction of one-third was allowed for bad tracts, and it was also provided that the lands could be paid for in United States securities. On the same day, Cutler and Sargent for themselves and associates transferred to William Duer, then Secretary of the Treasury Board, and his associates one equal moiety of the Scioto tract of land mentioned in the second contract. Both parties were to be equally interested in the sale of the land, and were to share equally any profit or loss. But the Scioto Company interest was speculative, and their contract lapsed before they purchased any land. In contrast, the Ohio Company had a genuine plan of settlement.

The company made its first installment of $500,000, but was unable to raise the second $500,000. It settled for a purchase of 750,000 acres (3,000 km^{2}), plus the two townships for College Lands and the reserved School Lands and Ministerial Lands sections in each township, for a total area of 913,833 acres (3,698.15 km^{2}), called the First Purchase. The lands were privately surveyed, but on the same plan of townships, ranges, and sections as the adjacent Seven Ranges under the procedure of the Land Ordinance of 1785.

== Settlement at Marietta, Ohio ==
In 1788, General Rufus Putnam laid out the plans for Marietta, the first permanent settlement in the present state of Ohio. The Ohio Company sent pioneers from New England to the Northwest Territory. Their first purchase was in Washington, Meigs, Gallia, Lawrence and Athens counties.

Difficulties with Native Americans during the Northwest Indian War, including the Big Bottom Massacre, led Congress in 1792 to donate 100,000 acres (400 km^{2}) on the north edge of the first purchase as a buffer against incursion. The Donation Tract incorporated much of present-day Washington and Morgan counties. Many associates of the company held army bounty warrants, which they could exchange for federal land, totaling 142,900 acres (578 km^{2}).

Later in 1792, the Ohio Company purchased another 214,285 acres (867.18 km^{2}) in Morgan, Hocking, Vinton and Athens counties, using these bounties, with the 1/3 discount for bad lands, as in the first purchase. The Second Purchase had no sections set aside for schools or ministry. The Second Purchase is also known as the Purchase on the Muskingum.

In 1796, the Ohio Company divided its shares and ceased to be a genuine land company.

| TRACT | AREA (acres) | AREA (Hectares) |
|---|---|---|
| First Purchase | 913833 | 369816 |
| Second Purchase | 214285 | 86718 |
| Donation Tract | 100000 | 40469 |
| Total | 1228118 | 497002 |

== See also ==
- Hildreth, Samuel Prescott – pioneer historian
- Historic regions of the United States
- Ohio Company Land Office
- Ohio Lands
