= Samuel Prescott Hildreth =

American medical doctor, scientist, and historian

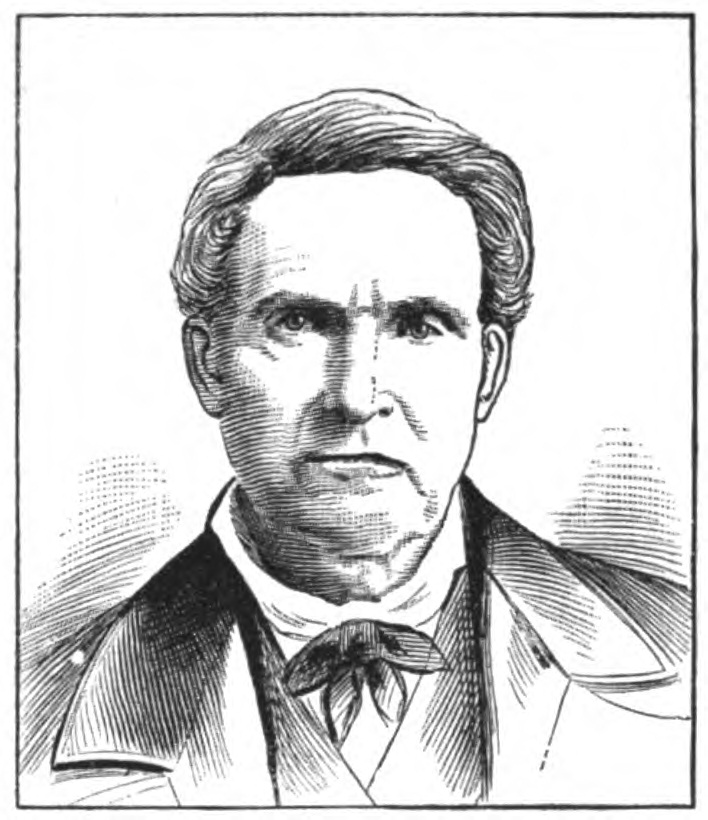
- Born: September 30, 1783; Methuen, Massachusetts
- Died: July 24, 1863 (aged 79); Marietta, Ohio
- Resting place: Mound Cemetery (Marietta, Ohio)
- Occupations: pioneer physician and scientist
- Organization(s): Massachusetts Medical Society, diploma (1805)
- Known for: pioneer historian, concerning the early days of Ohio and the Northwest Territory
- Notable work: Pioneer History: Being an Account of the First Examinations of the Ohio Valley, and the Early Settlement of the Northwest Territory (1848). Biographical and Historical Memoirs of the Early Pioneer Settlers of Ohio (1852).
- Spouse: Rhoda Cook
- Parent(s): Samuel Hildreth, Abagail Bodwell

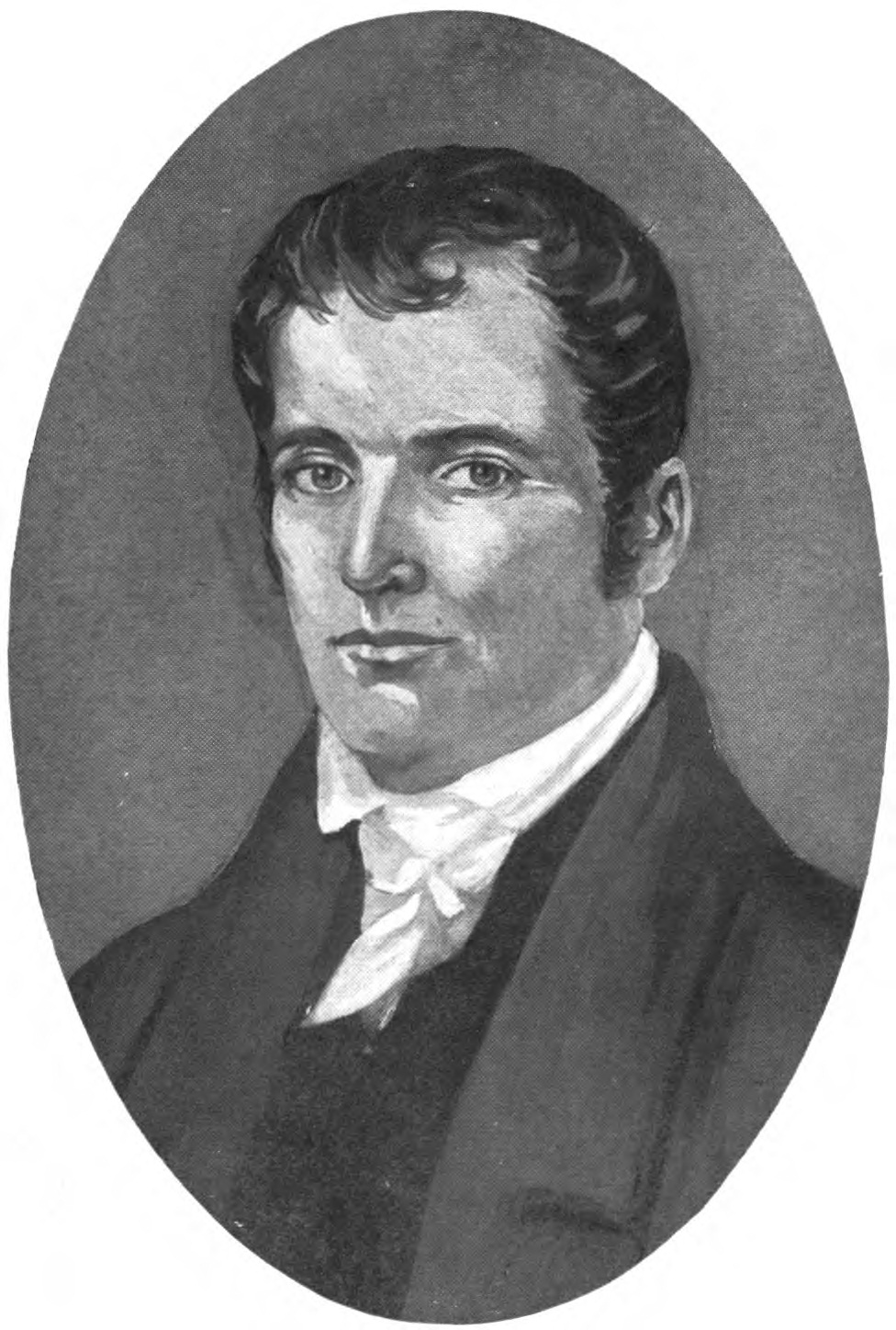
Samuel P. Hildreth in his younger days

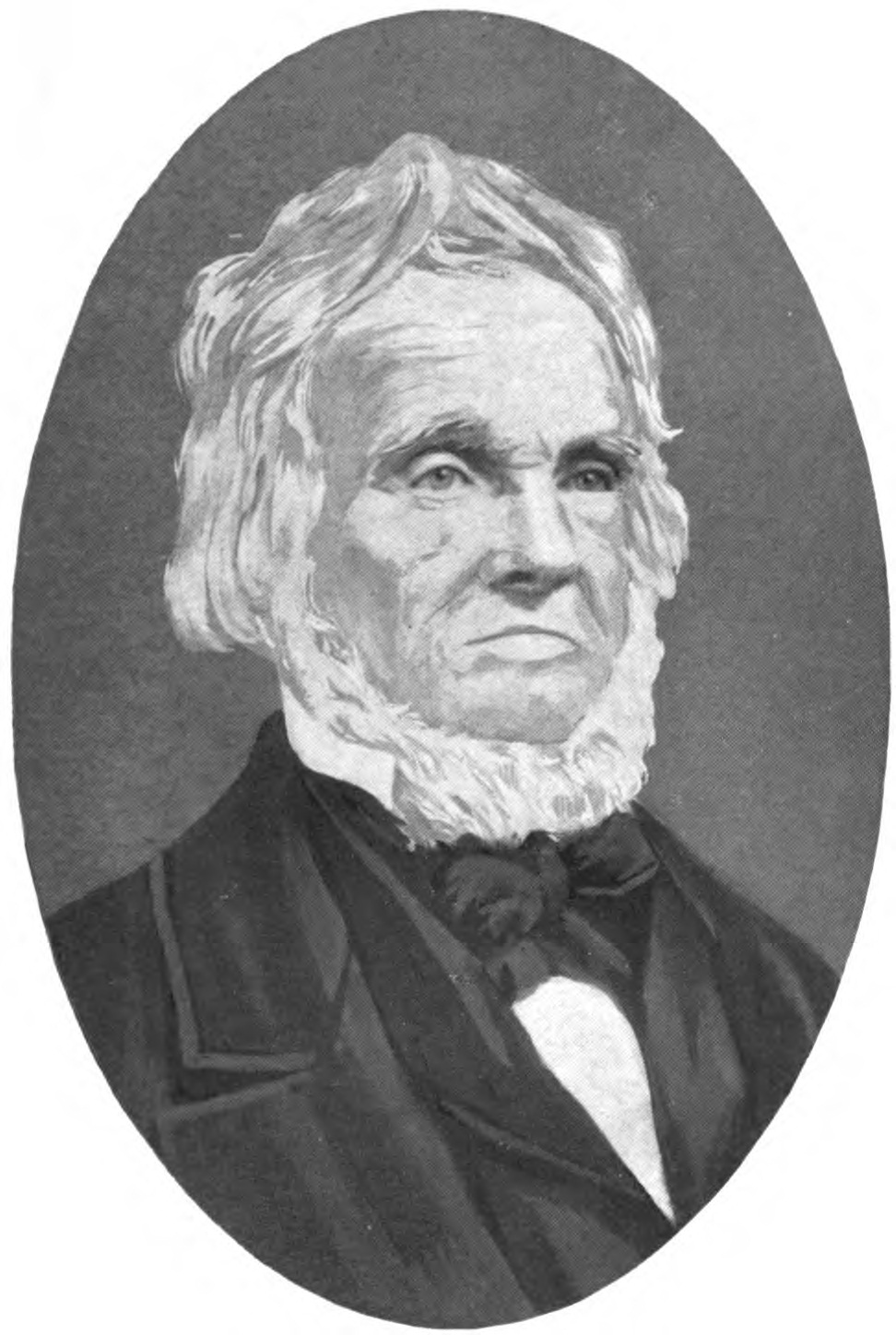
Samuel P. Hildreth in his latter days

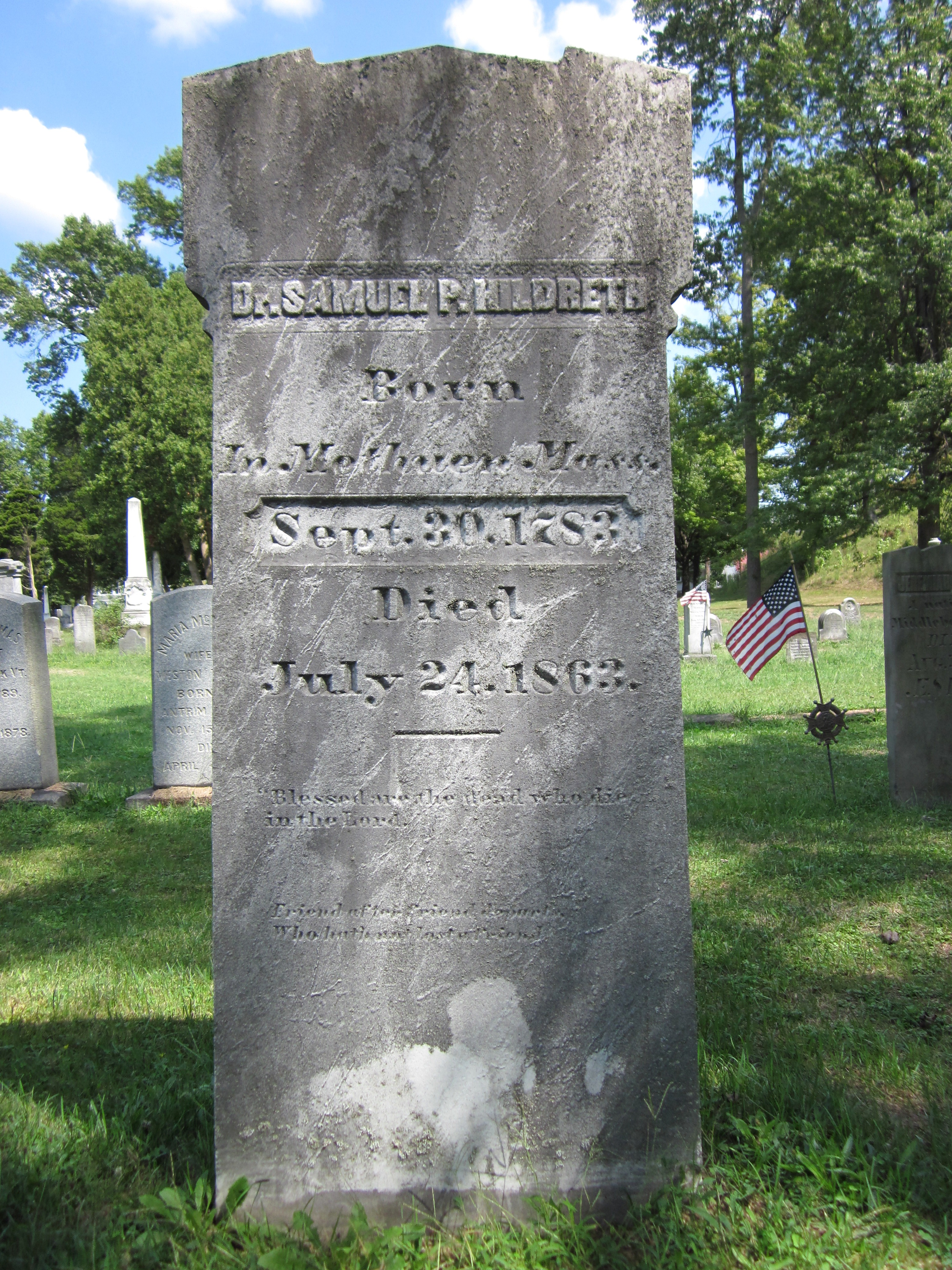
Samuel P. Hildreth marker at Mound Cemetery (Marietta, Ohio)

Samuel Prescott Hildreth (1783–1863) was a pioneer medical doctor, scientist, and historian, writing numerous scientific and historical works. His history books are largely based on first-person accounts and primary documents, providing insight into the early settlement of Marietta, Ohio, and the Northwest Territory and the lives of early pioneers.

== Early life ==
Samuel Prescott Hildreth was born in Methuen, Massachusetts, on September 30, 1783. His father, Dr. Samuel Hildreth of Massachusetts, was a physician with a regiment of volunteers during the American Revolutionary War, served as surgeon aboard a privateer, and became a prisoner-of-war. Samuel Prescott Hildreth was educated at the Phillips Academy at Andover, Massachusetts. He began medical studies under his father, completed studies under care of Dr. Thomas Kittredge of Andover, and received his diploma in 1805 after examination by the Massachusetts Medical Society. He subsequently practiced medicine in Hampstead, New Hampshire, until relocating to Ohio in 1806.

== Massachusetts to Ohio ==
His father, Samuel Hildreth, was a shareholder in the Ohio Company of Associates, and had considered moving to Ohio. Since he was a boy, Samuel Prescott Hildreth had a desire to see the Ohio Country; he acted on his desire at the age of 23, traveling by horseback to Marietta, Ohio, during September and October 1806. He spent about nine weeks in Marietta, then traveled 15 miles down the Ohio River to Belpre, Ohio. In August 1807 he married Ms. Rhoda Cook in Belpre. They permanently resettled to Marietta in March 1808. Subsequently, during 1810 and 1811, Dr. Samuel Prescott Hildreth served on the Ohio legislature. His father, Dr. Samuel Hildreth of Massachusetts, died while visiting him in Ohio during 1823 and was buried at Mound Cemetery in Marietta.

== Career ==
In Marietta, Samuel Prescott Hildreth served as the town's medical doctor and pursued the study of local history, botany, and geology. Hildreth was noted as one of the first pioneers of science in the country west of the Alleghany Mountains. He exhibited "a remarkable genius in drawing. Insects and plants were represented with scrupulous accuracy, and engravings made from them have a permanent value". "Dr. Hildreth was distinguished for his industrious research, and his numerous and well-received publications on professional topics; on natural history; on the antiquities, the modern history, and the resources, of his Western home." In addition to serving in the Ohio legislature, he also served on the Ohio Geologic Survey. Dr. Samuel Prescott Hildreth died in Marietta, Ohio, on July 24, 1863, and was buried at Mound Cemetery in Marietta, along with his father and with many Revolutionary War soldiers and founding pioneer settlers of Marietta and the Northwest Territory.

== Education and honors ==
- Phillips Andover Academy.
- Massachusetts Medical Society, Medical diploma (1805).
- Elected a member of the American Antiquarian Society in 1818.
- Ohio University, Honorary A.M. degree (1825).
- Medical Convention of Ohio, President (1839).
- Marietta College, Honorary Doctor of Laws degree (1859).

== Scientific publications ==
Hildreth was the author of numerous scientific publications. He was industrious, and provided many valuable contributions to medical journals from 1808 to 1825.

"In 1808 he published in the New York Medical Repository, a history of an epidemic which had prevailed the previous year; also in 1812 a description of the American Colomba, with a figure of the plant; likewise in 1822, an article on Hydrophobia, and another on a curious case of Siamese twins, in his practice. In 1824 he published in the Philadelphia Journal of Medical Science, a full history of the Great Epidemic Fever that visited the Ohio Valley and Marietta in 1822 and 1823; and in 1825, in the Western Journal of Medicine, Cincinnati, an account of the minor diseases of the epidemic. In 1826, he published in Silliman's Journal of Science, New Haven, a series of articles on the Natural and Civil History of Washington County. From that time until his death, nearly forty years, he was a contributor to the Journal—such articles as descriptions and drawings of fresh-water shells found in the Muskingum and other streams, several upon geological subjects, touching upon the geology of Southeastern Ohio, the salt-bearing rock, the history of salt manufacture from the first settlement of Ohio, the coal formation, &c."

The first volume of Archaeologia Americana, published in 1820, contains important letters on objects of antiquarian interest in the vicinity of Marietta, Ohio, from Dr. Hildreth; and soon after he made repeated contributions to the American Antiquarian Society relating to kindred subjects.

He presented his scientific library and his collections in various departments of natural history, numbering about 4000 specimens, to Marietta College, Ohio, where they occupied a room known as the Hildreth Cabinet, and his manuscripts are known as the Samuel P. Hildreth Collection.

== Historical publications ==
Dr. Hildreth authored several books concerning the early days of Ohio and the Northwest Territory, including:

- Original Contributions to the 'American Pioneer', J. S. Williams, Cincinnati, Ohio (1844).
- Pioneer History: Being an Account of the First Examinations of the Ohio Valley, and the Early Settlement of the Northwest Territory, H. W. Derby and Co., Cincinnati, Ohio (1848).
- Biographical and Historical Memoirs of the Early Pioneer Settlers of Ohio, H. W. Derby and Co., Cincinnati, Ohio (1852).
- Contributions to the Early History of the Northwest: including the Moravian Missions in Ohio, Poe and Hitchcock, Cincinnati, Ohio (1864).

The book Pioneer History provides the early civil history of the Northwest Territory, while the Early Pioneer Settlers of Ohio provides biographies of the earliest settlers.

== Bibliography ==
- Haverstock, M. S., Vance, J. M., and Meggitt, B. L.: Artists in Ohio, 1787-1900: A Biographical Dictionary, The Kent State University Press, Kent, Ohio (2000).
- Hawley, Owen: Mound Cemetery, Marietta, Ohio, Washington County Historical Society, Marietta, Ohio (1996).
- Hildreth, Samuel P.: Genealogical and Biographical Sketches of the Hildreth Family (1840).
- Howe, H.: Historical Collections of Ohio, Vol. II, C. J. Krehbiel and Co., Cincinnati, Ohio (1902).
- Johnson, R. and Brown, J. H.: Twentieth Century Biographical Dictionary of Notable Americans, Vol. V, The Biographical Society, Boston, Massachusetts (1904).
- Medical News and Library, Vol. XXI, No. 249, September 1863, Blanchard and Lea, Philadelphia, Pennsylvania (1863).
- Salisbury, S.: Proceedings of the American Antiquarian Society at the Semi-Annual Meeting held in Worcester, October 21, 1863, John Wilson and Son, Boston, Massachusetts (1863).
- Silliman, Silliman, and Dana: The American Journal of Science and Arts, Second Series, Vol. XXXVI, November 1863, E. Hayes, New Haven, Connecticut (1863).
- Stevens, E. B. and Murphy, J. A.: Cincinnati Lancet and Observer, Vol. VI, 1863, E. B. Stevens Cincinnati, Ohio (1863).
- Waller, A. E.: Ohio Archaeological and Historical Quarterly, Vol. 53, Dr. Samuel P. Hildreth, 1783-1863, by A. E. Walker", John L. Trauger (1944).
- Wilson, J. G. and Fiske, J.: Appletons' Cyclopædia of American Biography, Vol. III, D. Appleton and Co., New York, New York (1887).
