= College Lands =

Coordinates: 39°19′26″N 82°05′38″W

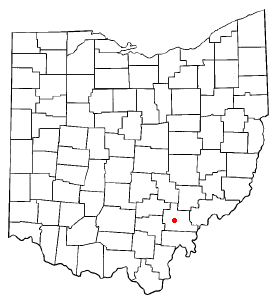
Location of College Lands in Ohio

The College Lands were a tract of land in the Northwest Territory, later Ohio, that the Congress donated for the support of a university. Ohio University became the first college northwest of the Ohio River as a beneficiary of this tract.

== Background ==
In 1787, Manasseh Cutler, as agent for the Ohio Company of Associates, petitioned Congress to purchase a large tract of land in the Northwest Territory. In this application, he insisted that two townships of land be appropriated for the support of a university. Thus, when the Continental Congress contracted with the company October 23, 1787 included was that “not more than two complete townships should be given perpetually for the purpose of a university; that they be laid off by the purchasers as near the center of the tract as may be and applied to the intended object by the legislature of the state.” Thus, two townships of thirty six square miles each, near the center of the first tract purchased, were reserved for that purpose.

== Tracts Selected ==
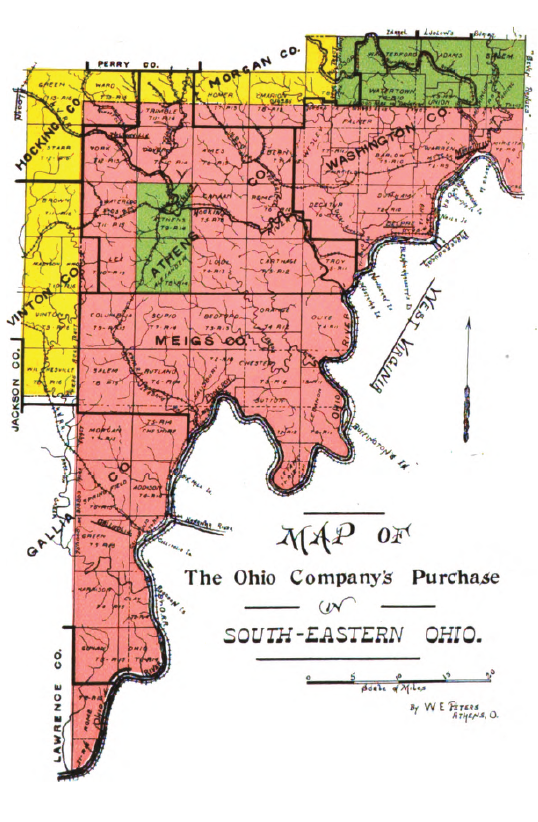
The pink area is the First Purchase of the Ohio Company. The green rectangle within it is the College Lands set aside for university support.

The directors of the Ohio Company selected townships 8 and 9 of the 14th range of the Ohio River survey at a meeting on December 16, 1795 for maintenance of the proposed university. These correspond to the modern civil townships of Alexander and Athens Township, Athens County.

== American Western University Chartered ==
Manasseh Cutler drafted legislation that was introduced by his son Ephraim Cutler, and on January 9, 1802, the Territorial Legislature of the Northwest Territory passed “an act establishing a university in the town of Athens.” This act created the American Western University and section eleven of the act vested the two townships with the corporation created to run the university, allowing the trustees to divide and lease the lands for not more than 21 years. American Western University never came to be. One author says it was because no one could be induced to lease wilderness lands for such a short period, while another maintains bad roads, widely separated trustees, and distraction of impending statehood were responsible.

== Ohio University Chartered ==
The act chartering American Western University was never repealed. The state had the College Townships appraised in 1803. On February 18, 1804, the Ohio legislature passed another “act establishing a university in the town of Athens.” This act named the university “Ohio University” and authorized the trustees to lease the land “for the term of ninety years, renewable forever, on a yearly rent of six percentum on the amount of valuation” subject to re-evaluation after 35 and 60 years. No leases were taken, as land in adjacent townships could be bought outright for one dollar per acre or less, and no one would risk such re-evaluations. In February 1805, the state directed that leases should run for 99 years, renewable forever, at six percent of appraised valuation. In 1826, the university was permitted to sell lands within the townships, but for leased lands, the rent established in 1805 still prevails.

== See also ==
- Ohio Company of Associates
- Ohio Lands
- Ohio University
