= Farmer's Castle =

- Part of the Northwest Territory of the United States
- Belpre, Ohio
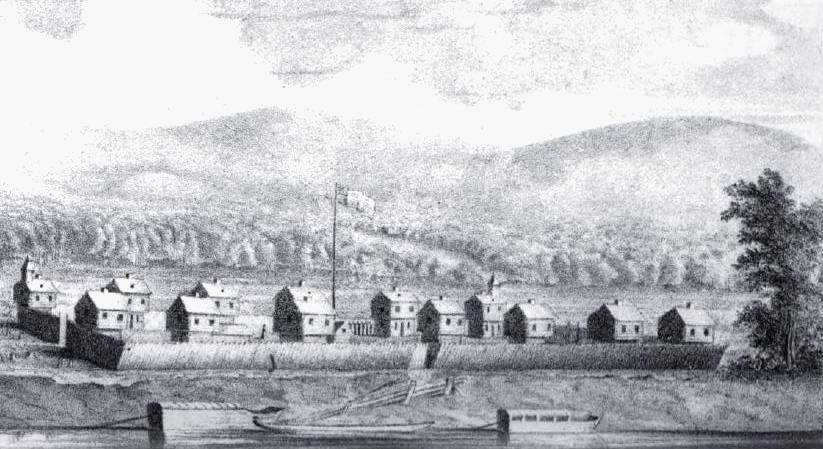
- Farmer's Castle fortification at Belpre, Ohio

Location
- Coordinates: 39°16′17″N 81°34′33″W

Site history
- Built: 1791
- Battles/wars: Northwest Indian War

Garrison information
- Past commanders: Nathaniel Goodale, Nathaniel Cushing
- Occupants: Ohio Company of Associates

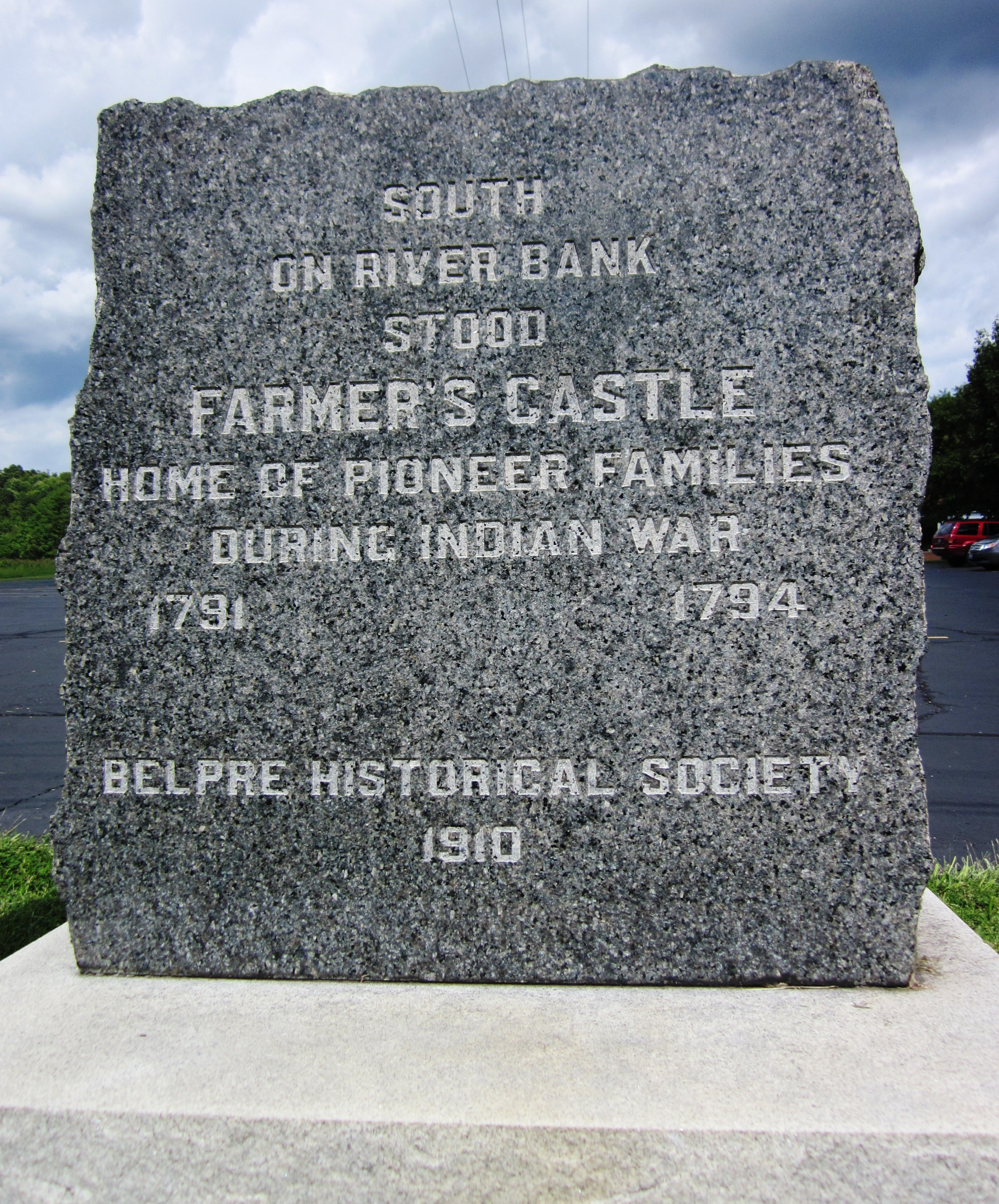
Farmer's Castle marker at Belpre, Ohio

Farmer's Castle was a defensive fortification built opposite the mouth of the Little Kanawha River on the Ohio River by a group of pioneers from the Ohio Company of Associates. It was located about 15 miles downriver of Marietta, Ohio, the first European-American settlement in the Northwest Territory. The pioneers had surveyed the land during the winter of 1788–89, and moved from Marietta to their new farms in April 1789. They called their town Belle-prairie, or modern day Belpre, Ohio. Adjacent to the island later known as Blennerhasset Island, the settlers began construction of Farmer's Castle during January 1791 for protection during the Northwest Indian War.

The work was commenced the first week in January, and was prosecuted with the utmost energy, as their lives, apparently, depended on its completion. As fast as the block houses were built, the families moved into them. They were thirteen in number, arranged in two rows, with a wide street between, as shown in the engraving. The basement story was in general twenty feet square, and the upper about twenty-two feet, thus projecting over the lower one, and forming a defense from which to protect the doors and windows below, in an attack. They were built of round logs a foot in diameter, and the interstices nicely chinked and pointed with mortar. The doors and window shutters were made of thick oak planks, or puncheons, and secured with stout bars of wood on the inside. The larger timbers were hauled with ox-teams, of which they had several yokes, while the lighter for the roofs, gates, &c, were dragged along on hand sleds, with ropes, by the men. The drawing was much facilitated by a few inches of snow, which covered the ground. The pickets were made of quartered oak timber, growing on the plain back of the garrison, formed from trees about a foot in diameter, fourteen feet in length, and set four feet deep in the ground, leaving them ten feet high, over which no enemy could mount without a ladder. The smooth side was set outward, and the palisades strengthened and kept in their places by stout ribbons, or wall pieces, pinned to them with inch treenails on the inside. The spaces between the houses were filled up with pickets, and occupied three or four times the width of the houses, forming a continuous wall, or inclosure, about eighty rods in length and six rods wide. The palisades on the river side filled the whole space, and projected over the edge of the bank, leaning on rails and posts set to support them. They were sloped in this manner for the admission of air during the heat of summer.

== Regional forts ==
Fortified settlements were constructed in other parts of the region. Upriver from Marietta, located at the mouth of the Muskingum River, United States troops built Fort Harmar, and the Ohio Company of Associates built Campus Martius and Picketed Point Stockade. Up the Muskingum River from Marietta, other Associates built Fort Frye. It developed as modern-day Beverly, Ohio.

== See also ==
- American pioneers to the Northwest Territory
- Ohio Company of Associates

== Bibliography ==
- Hildreth, S. P.: Pioneer History: Being an Account of the First Examinations of the Ohio Valley, and the Early Settlement of the Northwest Territory, H. W. Derby and Co., Cincinnati, Ohio (1848).
