= Northwest Territory =

United States territory (1787–1803)

Territory Northwest of the River Ohio
- Organized incorporated territory of United States
- 1787–1803
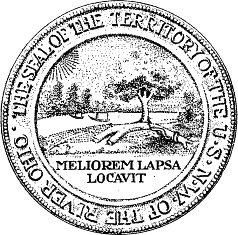
- Flag Seal

- Territory Northwest of the River Ohio, 1787
- Capital: Marietta (1788–1790); Cincinnati (1790–1799); Chillicothe (1799–1803)
- Area
  - Coordinates: 41°N 86°W
- Government
  - Type: Organized incorporated territory
  - Motto: Meliorem lapsa locavit "He has planted one better than the one fallen"
- Governor
  - 1787–1802: Arthur St. Clair
  - 1802–1803: Charles Willing Byrd
- History
  - Northwest Ordinance: July 13, 1787
  - Affirmed by United States Congress: August 7, 1789
  - Indiana Territory created: May 7, 1800
  - Statehood of Ohio: March 1, 1803
Preceded by	Succeeded by
Province of Quebec (1763–1791); United Indian Nations	Ohio; Indiana Territory

The Northwest Territory, also known as the Old Northwest (Note: This term was a later and somewhat broader American term for the area to distinguish it from the Midwestern United States and/or the Pacific Northwest.) and formally as the Territory Northwest of the River Ohio, was formed from part of the unorganized western territory of the United States after the American Revolution. Established in 1787 by the Congress of the Confederation through the Northwest Ordinance, it was the nation's first post-colonial organized incorporated territory.

At the time of its creation, the territory included all the land west of Pennsylvania, northwest of the Ohio River and east of the Mississippi River below the Great Lakes, and what later became known as the Boundary Waters. The region was ceded to the United States in the Treaty of Paris of 1783. Throughout the Revolutionary War, the region was part of the British Province of Quebec and the western theater of the war. It spanned all or large parts of six eventual U.S. states (Ohio, Indiana, Illinois, Michigan, Wisconsin, and the northeastern part of Minnesota). Reduced to present-day Ohio, and some additional lands north and east on July 4, 1800, it ceased to exist March 1, 1803, when the southeastern portion of the territory was admitted to the Union as the state of Ohio, and the remainder attached to Indiana Territory.

Initially, the territory was governed by martial law under a governor and three judges. As population increased, a legislature was formed as were a succession of counties, eventually totaling thirteen. At the time of its creation, the land within the territory was largely undisturbed by urban development. It was also home to several Native American cultures, including the Lenni Lenape (Delaware), Miami, Potawatomi, Shawnee, and others. There were a handful of French colonial settlements remaining, plus Clarksville at the Falls of the Ohio. By the time of the territory's dissolution, there were dozens of towns and settlements, a few with thousands of settlers, chiefly along the Ohio and Miami Rivers and the south shore of Lake Erie in Ohio. Conflicts between settlers and Native American inhabitants of the Territory resulted in the Northwest Indian War culminating in General "Mad" Anthony Wayne's victory at Battle of Fallen Timbers in 1794. The subsequent Treaty of Greenville in 1795 opened the way for settlement particularly in southern and western Ohio.

== Area ==
The Northwest Territory included all the then-owned land of the United States west of Pennsylvania, east of the Mississippi River, and northwest of the Ohio River. It incorporated most of the former Ohio Country except a portion in western Pennsylvania, and eastern Illinois Country. It covered all of the modern states of Ohio, Indiana, Illinois, Michigan, and Wisconsin, as well as the northeastern part of Minnesota.

Lands west of the Mississippi River were the Louisiana Province of New Spain, formerly New France, acquired by the United States in 1803 by the Louisiana Purchase. Lands north of the Great Lakes were part of the British Province of Upper Canada. Lands south of the Ohio River constituted Kentucky County, Virginia, admitted to the union as the state of Kentucky in 1792. The area included more than 300,000 square miles (780,000 km^{2}) and comprised about 1/3 of the land area of the United States at the time of its creation.

It was inhabited by about 45,000 Native Americans and 4,000 non-native traders, mostly of French Canadian, British or Irish descent. Among the tribes inhabiting the region were the Shawnee, Delaware, Miami, Wyandot, Ojibwa, Ottawa and Potawatomi. Notably, the Miami tribal capital along with British trading posts was at Kekionga, at the site of present-day Fort Wayne, Indiana. Neutralizing Kekionga became the focus of the Northwest Indian War, the driving events in the early evolution of the territory.

== History ==
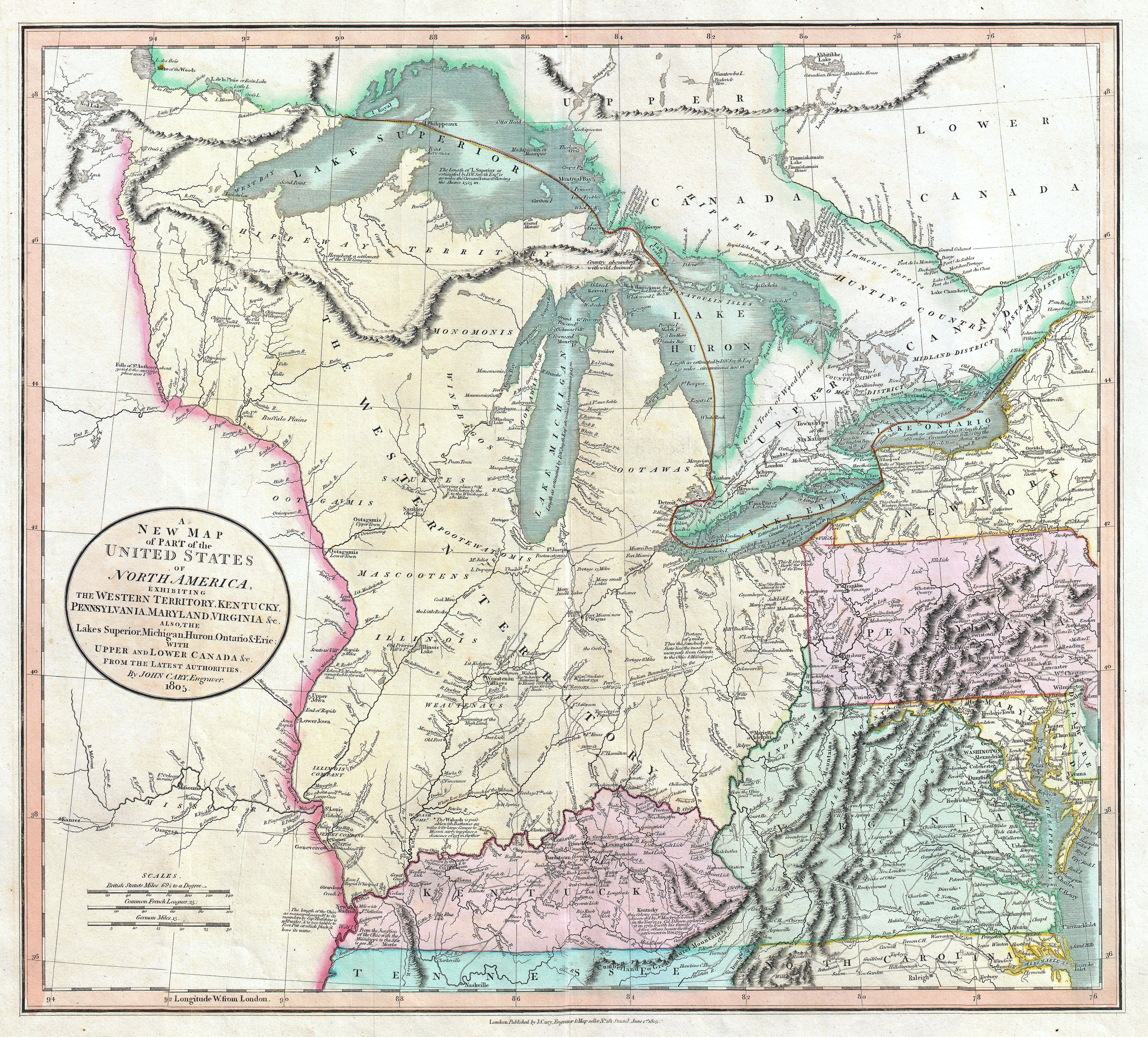
1805 Cary map of the Great Lakes, Western Territory, Kentucky, Virginia, etc.

Integration of the Northwest Territory into a political unit, and settlement, depended on three factors: relinquishment by the British, extinguishment of states' claims west of the Appalachians, and usurpation or purchase of lands from the Native Americans. These objectives were accomplished correspondingly by the American Revolutionary War, provisions in the Articles of Confederation, and various treaties preceding the Northwest Indian War including Treaty of Fort Stanwix (1784) and Treaty of Fort McIntosh (1785). The treaty process extended well beyond the War and existence of the Territory as a political entity.

=== New France ===
European exploration of the region began with French-Canadian voyageurs in the 17th century, followed by French missionaries and French fur traders. French-Canadian explorer Jean Nicolet was the first recorded European entrant into the region, landing in 1634 at the current site of Green Bay, Wisconsin (although Étienne Brûlé is stated by some sources as having explored Lake Superior and possibly inland Wisconsin in 1622). The French exercised control from widely separate posts in the region, which they claimed as New France; among these was the post at Fort Detroit, founded in 1701. France ceded the territory to the Kingdom of Great Britain as part of the Indian Reserve in the 1763 Treaty of Paris, after being defeated in the French and Indian War.

=== British control ===
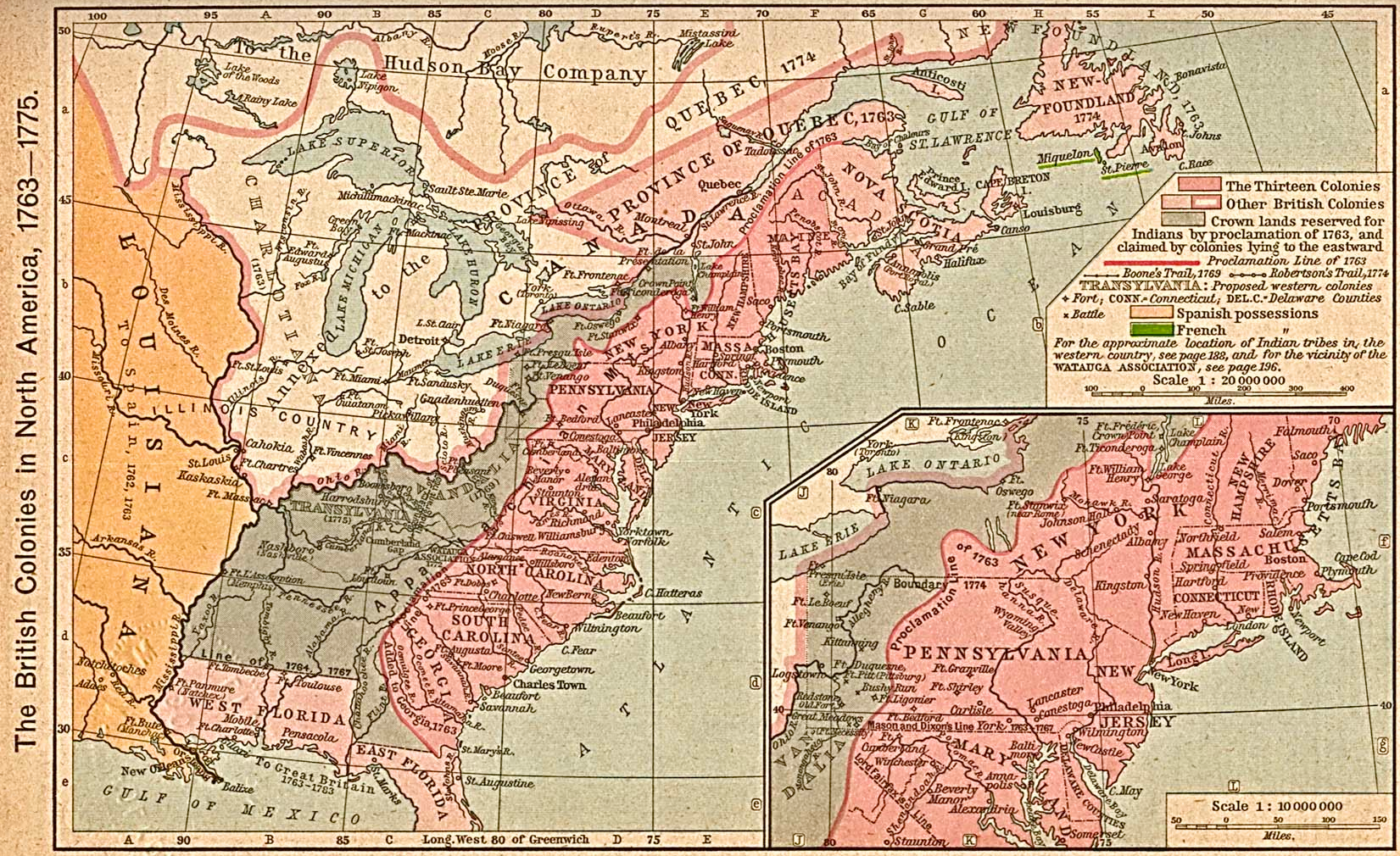
Map of British America showing the original boundaries of the Province of Quebec, and its Quebec Act 1774 post-annexation boundaries

From the 1750s to the peace treaty that ended the War of 1812, the British had a long-standing goal of creating an Indian barrier state, a large Native American state that would cover most of the Old Northwest. It would be independent of the United States and allied with the British, who would use it to block American westward expansion and to build up their control of the North American fur trade headquartered in Montreal.

A new colony, named Charlotina, was proposed for establishment in the southern Great Lakes region before the events of Pontiac's War, after which the Crown issued the Proclamation of 1763, which prohibited white colonial settlement west of the Appalachian Mountains. This action angered American colonists interested in expansion, as well as those who had already settled in the area. In 1774, via the Quebec Act, Britain annexed the region to the Province of Quebec in order to provide a civil government and to centralize British administration of the Montreal-based fur trade. The prohibition of settlement west of the Appalachians remained, contributing to the American Revolution.

In February 1779, George Rogers Clark, leading a force of Virginia militia, captured Kaskaskia and Vincennes from British commander Henry Hamilton. Virginia capitalized on Clark's success by laying claim to the whole of the Old Northwest, calling it Illinois County, Virginia, until 1784, when it ceded its land claims to the federal government. Britain officially ceded the area north of the Ohio River and west of the Appalachians to the United States at the end of the American Revolutionary War with the Treaty of Paris (1783), but the British continued to maintain a presence in the region as late as 1815, the end of the War of 1812.

=== Cessions by the states ===
The state cessions that eventually allowed for the creation of the territories north and southwest of the Ohio River

Several states (Virginia, Massachusetts, New York, and Connecticut) had competing claims on the territory: Virginia claimed all of the portion that was formerly Illinois Country and Ohio Country; Massachusetts claimed the portion that is now southern Michigan and Wisconsin; Connecticut claimed a narrow strip across the territory just south of the Great Lakes; New York claimed an elastic portion of Iroquois lands between Lake Erie and the Ohio River. The western boundary of Pennsylvania was also ill-defined. Virginia's jurisdiction was limited to a few French settlements at the extreme western edge of the territory. Massachusetts's and Connecticut's claims were effectively lines on paper. New York had no colonial settlements or territorial government in the claimed lands.

The western border of Pennsylvania, previously assumed to run in a north by northeast zigzag, was resolved in 1780 by the Continental Congress. The Mason–Dixon line was extended westward to a point five degrees of longitude (about 260 miles) from the Delaware River and the western boundary extended to run due north from the westernmost extent of the Mason–Dixon line to the 43rd parallel. This incorporated the eastern part of Ohio Country as western Pennsylvania, and set the eastern boundary of federal lands.

"Unlanded" states, such as Maryland, refused to ratify the Articles of Confederation so long as these states were allowed to keep their western territory, fearing that those states could continue to grow and tip the balance of power in their favor under the proposed system of federal government. As a concession to obtain ratification, these states ceded their claims on the territory to the federal government: New York in 1780, Virginia in 1784, and Massachusetts and Connecticut in 1785. So the majority of the territory became public land owned by the U.S. government. Virginia and Connecticut reserved two areas to use as compensation to military veterans: the Virginia Military District and the Connecticut Western Reserve

Thomas Jefferson's Land Ordinance of 1784 was the first organization of the territory by the United States; it provided a process for dividing the territory into individual states. The Land Ordinance of 1785 established a standardized system for surveying the land into saleable lots, although Ohio was partially surveyed several times using different methods, resulting in a patchwork of land surveys in Ohio. Some older French communities' property claims based on earlier systems of long, narrow lots also were retained. The rest of the Northwest Territory was divided into roughly uniform square townships and sections, which facilitated land sales and development. The ordinance also stipulated that the territory would eventually form three to five new states.

=== Founding ===
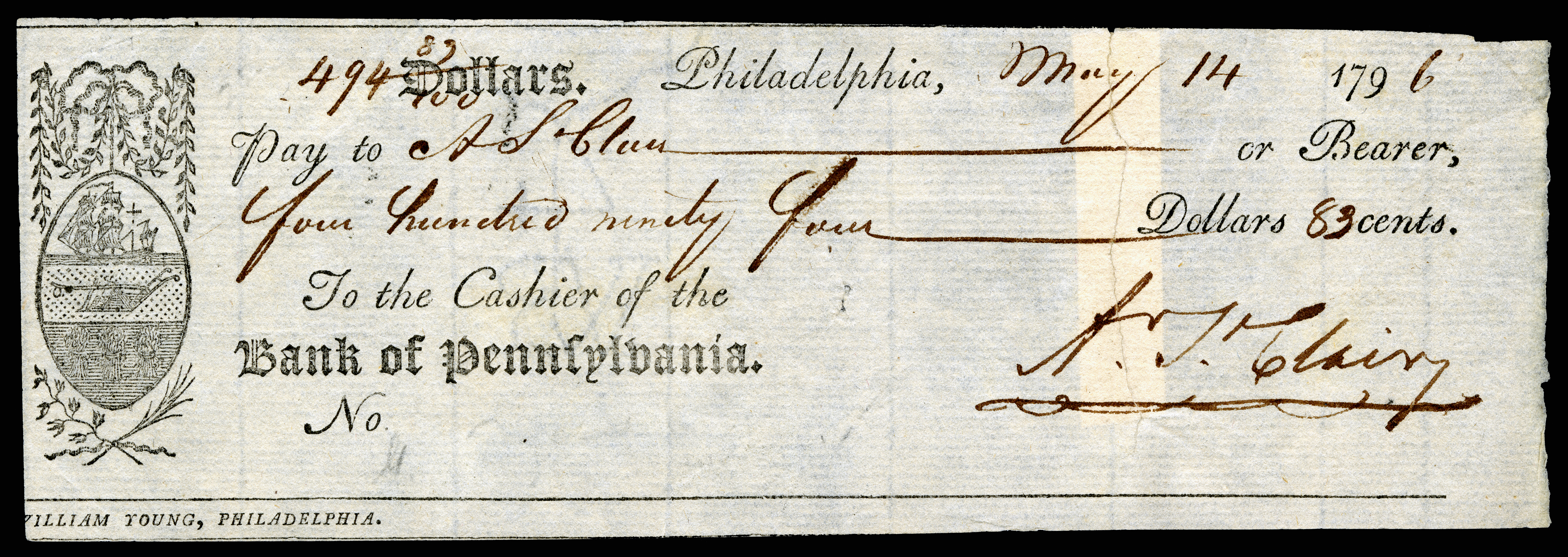
Check signed by Arthur St. Clair while governor of the Northwest Territory, 1796

Under the Northwest Ordinance of 1787, which created the Northwest Territory, General St. Clair was appointed governor. When the territory was divided in 1800, he briefly served as governor of the Northwest Territory remnant that included Ohio, the eastern half of Michigan, and a sliver of southeastern Indiana called "The Gore".

St. Clair formally established the government on July 15, 1788, at Marietta. In 1790, he renamed the settlement of Losantiville Cincinnati, after the Society of the Cincinnati, and moved the administrative and military center to Fort Washington.

As Governor, he formulated the Maxwell's Code (named after its printer, William Maxwell), the first written criminal and civil laws of the territory. Maxwell's Code consisted of thirty-seven different laws with the stipulation that the laws had to have been passed previously in one of the original thirteen states. The laws restructured the court system then in effect in the Northwest Territory. They also protected residents against excessive taxes and declared that English common law would be the basis of legal decisions and laws in the Northwest Territory.

=== Northwest Indian War ===
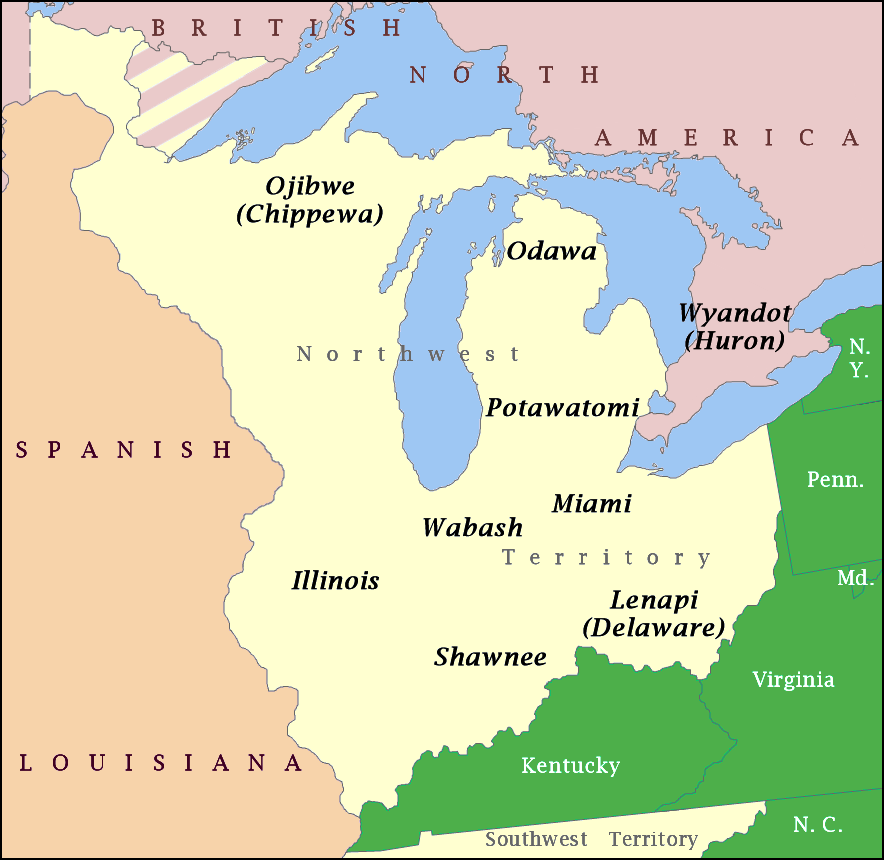
A map showing the general distribution of Native American tribes in the Northwest Territory in the early 1790s

The young United States government, deeply in debt following the Revolutionary War and lacking authority to tax under the Articles of Confederation, planned to raise revenue from the methodical sale of land in the Northwest Territory. This plan necessarily called for the removal of both Native American villages and squatters from lands west of Appalachia, loosely, the territory called "Ohio Country" and beyond. Resistance from indigenous tribes, who were supported by the continued British presence in the Northwest Territory, presented a continuing obstacle for American expansion.

The area making up the Ohio Country had been contested for over a century, beginning with the 17th-century Beaver Wars. The Western Confederacy, or Western Indian Confederacy, was a loose confederacy of Native Americans in the Great Lakes region of the United States created following the American Revolutionary War. Congress passed the Proclamation of 1783, which recognized Native American rights to the land. A council held in 1785 at Fort Detroit declared that the confederacy would deal jointly with the United States, forbade individual tribes from dealing directly with the United States, and declared the Ohio River as the boundary between their lands and those of the American settlers.

The Northwest Territory's first governor, Arthur St. Clair, sought to end Native American claims to Ohio land and thus clear the way for white settlement. In 1789, he succeeded in getting certain Native Americans to sign the Treaty of Fort Harmar, but many native leaders had not been invited to participate in the negotiations or had refused to do so. Rather than settling the Native Americans' claims, the treaty provoked an escalation of the "Northwest Indian War" (or "Little Turtle's War"). Mutual hostilities led to a campaign by General Josiah Harmar, whose 1,500 militiamen were defeated by the Native Americans in October 1790.

A group of squatters had moved up to the area near present-day Stockport now in Morgan County, Ohio, and settled along flood plain, or "bottom" land, of the Muskingum River, some 30 miles north of an Ohio Company of Associates settlement at Marietta, Ohio. The Big Bottom massacre occurred on January 2, 1791. Lenape and Wyandot warriors stormed the incomplete blockhouse and killed eleven men, one woman, and two children. (Accounts vary as to the number of casualties.) Rufus Putnam wrote to President Washington that "we shall be so reduced and discouraged as to give up the settlement [Marietta following the Big Bottom disaster]."

In March 1791, St. Clair succeeded Harmar as commander of the United States Army and was commissioned as a major general. He led a punitive expedition involving two Regular Army regiments and some militia. In October 1791 as an advance post for his campaign, Fort Jefferson (Ohio), was built under his direction. Located in present-day Darke County in far western Ohio, the fort was built of wood and intended primarily as a supply depot; accordingly, it was originally named Fort Deposit. One month later, near modern-day Fort Recovery, his force advanced to the location of Native American settlements near the headwaters of the Wabash River.

On November 4 they were routed in battle by a tribal confederation led by Miami Chief Little Turtle and Shawnee chief Blue Jacket. More than 600 soldiers and scores of women and children were killed in the battle, known as "St. Clair's Defeat" and many other names. It remains the greatest defeat of a US army by Native Americans in history. About 623 American soldiers were killed in action, and about 50 Native Americans were killed. Although an investigation exonerated him, St. Clair resigned his army commission in March 1792 at the request of President Washington, but continued to serve as Governor of the Northwest Territory.

After St. Clair's defeat, In June 1792, President Washington tapped revolutionary war hero Major General "Mad" Anthony Wayne to avenge St. Clair and assert sovereignty over the western frontier. Wayne was commissioned to form a new army of 5120 professional soldiers, dubbed the "Legion of the United States". Wayne recruited and trained his army in Pennsylvania, and moved them to southwestern Ohio in fall of 1793.

There they were joined by the Kentucky Militia under Major General Charles Scott. Over the next ten months, the armies marched north up the Great Miami and Maumee River valleys toward the Miami capital of Kekionga. Along the way Wayne's legion built a series of outpost forts including Fort Greene Ville, Fort Recovery and Fort Defiance. Fierce battles occurred around some of these but none of Wayne's forts were ever taken by the Native Americans.

In mid 1794, the British constructed Fort Miamis near what is today Toledo, Ohio, to forestall Wayne's putative advance on the British stronghold at Detroit. The final battle of Wayne's campaign occurred within the scope of this fort. The military campaign of Gen. Wayne against the Western Confederacy, who were supported by a company of troops from Lower Canada, culminated with victory at the Battle of Fallen Timbers in 1794. Following the battle, in fall 1794, Wayne's army marched unopposed to Kekionga where they constructed Fort Wayne, a defiant symbol of U.S. sovereignty in the heart of Native American Country.

Jay's Treaty, in 1794, temporarily helped to smooth relations with British traders in the region, where British subjects outnumbered Americans throughout the 1790s. The following year, the Treaty of Greenville secured peace on the western frontier and opened most of southern and eastern Ohio for American settlement.

=== Settlement ===
Historical population
Year	Pop.	±%
1792	7,920	—
1800	45,365	+472.8%
Source: 1792; 1800 (includes only Ohio and Wayne County, Michigan)

Sporadic westward emigrant settlements had already resumed late in the Revolutionary War after the Iroquois Confederacy's power was broken and the tribes scattered by the 1779 Sullivan Expedition. Soon after the Revolution ended, land-hungry migrants started moving west. A gateway trading post developed as the town of Brownsville, Pennsylvania, which was a key outfitting center west of the mountains. Other wagon roads, such as the Kittanning Path surmounting the gaps of the Allegheny in central Pennsylvania, or trails along the Mohawk River in New York, enabled a steady stream of settlers to reach the near west and the lands bordering the Mississippi. (Note: Before the 1803 Louisiana Purchase, the western border of U.S. territory ended on the Mississippi; the lands beyond still being a possession of Napoleonic France or the Kingdom of Spain.)

This activity stimulated the development of the eastern parts of the eventual National Road by private investors. The Cumberland–Brownsville toll road linked the water routes of the Potomac River with the Monongahela River of the Ohio/Mississippi riverine systems in the days when water travel was the only good alternative to walking and riding. Most of the territory and its successors was settled by emigrants passing through the Cumberland Narrows, or along the Mohawk Valley in New York State.

The Continental Congress's title to the lands north of the Ohio River was derived from the Treaty of Paris (1783), the Treaty of Fort McIntosh, and the cessions of four states. Settlement was through several means: squatters, direct U.S. government land sales to settlers, sales of tracts of land to land companies, and state sales of land to veterans in the Virginia Military District and Connecticut Western Reserve. The first area to be surveyed was the Seven Ranges along the eastern border of Ohio in 1786–1789. Direct sales of federal lands to individual homesteaders started here. In some cases, the government granted or donated land for special purposes.

Settlement followed the forts, whether garrisoned or not. Lack of a garrison meant that threat of Native American attack had become negligible. This was true everywhere in Ohio before 1800 except the northwest sector above the Greenville Treaty line. It became true in Indiana after the Battle of Tippecanoe in 1811; by 1813 Battle of the Thames where Tecumseh was defeated and killed, the frontier had essentially moved to west of the Mississippi. The first U.S. military garrisons in the territory were Fort Patrick Henry, Vincennes, Indiana (1779), Fort Clark at Falls of the Ohio, Indiana (1783), and Fort Harmar in Ohio (1785). The first settlements were at these locations.

The first land grant was to George Rogers Clark in 1781 at Falls of the Ohio on the Indiana side; he went on to found the settlement of Clarksville. The first two land purchases were large tracts of land sold to John Symmes (Symmes Purchase) in 1788 and two tracts sold to Ohio Company in 1787 and 1792 (Purchase on the Muskingum). Settlement of these areas was spearheaded by Losantiville and Marietta, respectively. In 1792, Congress donated 100,000 acres to Ohio Company as a buffer zone against Native American incursion around the settled area. The vexing land claims by inhabitants of the old French Vincennes Tract were resolved by what was dubbed the 'Vincennes donation lands' embodied in a federal land act of 1791. Federal land sales in Indiana (then a part of Indiana Territory starting in 1800) began in 1801, through the Cincinnati land office.

After the Revolutionary War ended, Rufus Putnam (the "Father of Ohio") and Manasseh Cutler were instrumental in creating the Northwest Ordinance, which opened up the Northwest Territory for settlement. This land was used to serve as compensation for what was owed to Revolutionary War veterans. It was at Putnam's recommendation that the land was surveyed and laid out in townships of six miles square. He organized and led the first group of veterans to the territory. They settled at Marietta, Ohio, where they built a large fort called Campus Martius.

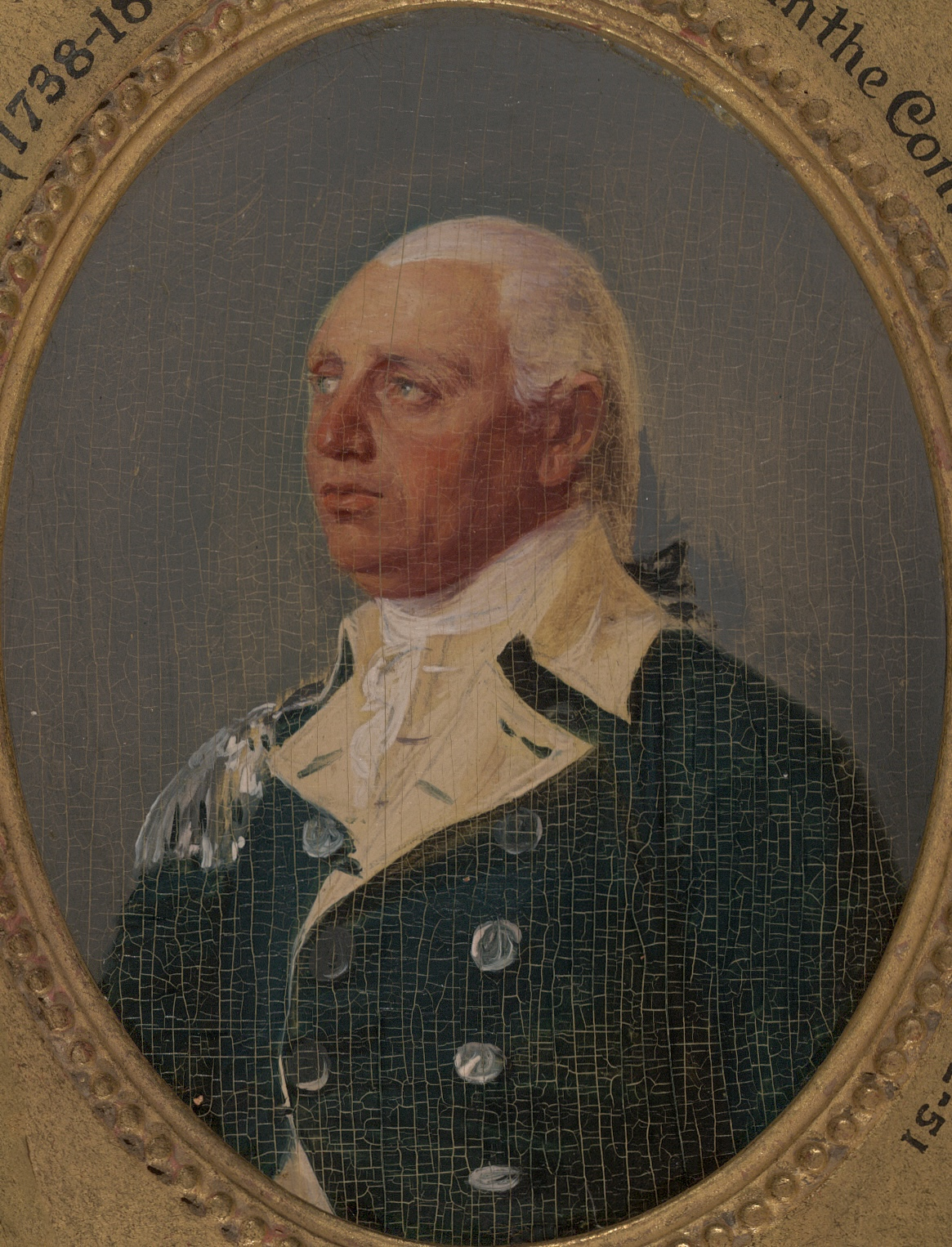
Rufus Putnam, portrait miniature by John Trumbull, c. 1790

Putnam and Cutler insisted the Northwest Territory be a free territory, with no slavery. The Northwest Territory doubled the size of the United States, and establishing it as free of slavery proved to be of tremendous importance in the following decades. It encompassed what became Ohio, Indiana, Illinois, Michigan, Wisconsin and part of Minnesota.

Putnam, in the Puritan tradition, was influential in establishing education in the Northwest Territory. Substantial amounts of land were set aside for schools. Putnam had been one of the primary benefactors in the founding of Leicester Academy in Massachusetts, and similarly, in 1798, he created the plan for the construction of the Muskingum Academy (now Marietta College) in Ohio. In 1780, the directors of the Ohio Company appointed him superintendent of all its affairs relating to settlement north of the Ohio River. In 1796, he was commissioned by President George Washington as Surveyor-General of United States Lands. In 1788, he served as a judge in the Northwest Territory's first court. In 1802, he served in the convention to form a constitution for the State of Ohio.

In the 1800 United States census, following the passage of an organic act by the 6th U.S. Congress creating the Indiana Territory in 1800, seven counties in the Northwest Territory reported the following population counts:

Rank	County	Population
1	Hamilton	14,692
2	Jefferson	8,766
3	Ross	8,540
4	Washington	5,427
5	Adams	3,432
6	Wayne	3,206
7	Trumbull	1,302
	Northwest Territory	45,365

According to the 1800 Census of the United States, the Northwest Territory (i.e. the pending state of Ohio) had a population, excluding Native Americans, of over 45,000, and Indiana Territory, a population of about 5,600. By the time of Ohio statehood, there were as many as 50 named towns in Northwest and Indiana Territories, a few, like Vincennes, with thousands of settlers, and dozens of unnamed settlements below the Treaty Line in Ohio.

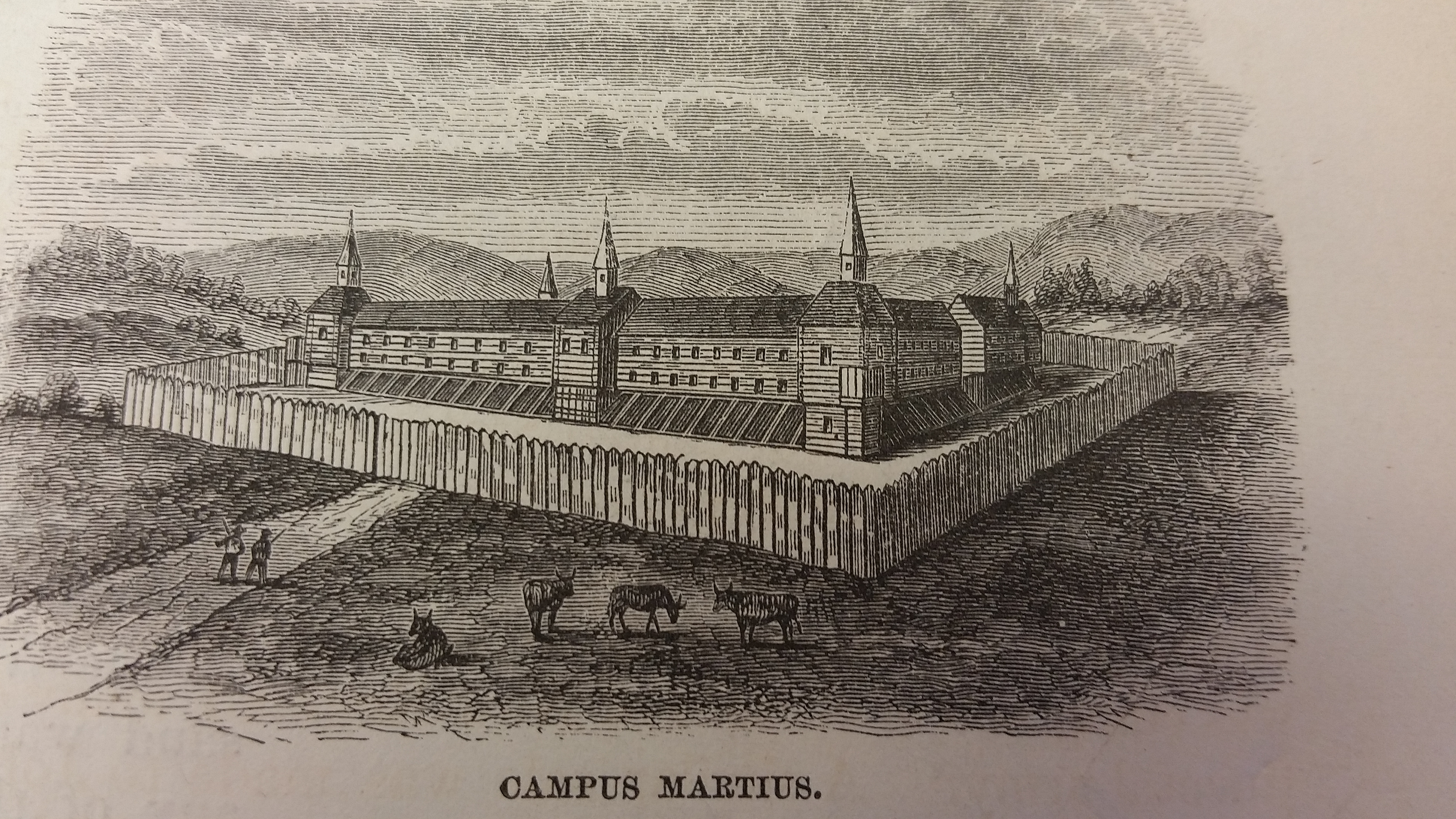
Campus Martius ("Field of Mars" in Latin) was named after the part of Rome of the same name. This site, including the Rufus Putnam House, is now part of the Campus Martius Museum in Marietta, Ohio.

Following settlement of the frontier, the great wave of colonial immigration flowed westward, founding the great cities of the eventual 6 states of the Territory which is now the midwestern United States early in the 19th century: Detroit (<1800), Cleveland (1796), Columbus (1812), Indianapolis (1822), Chicago (1833), Milwaukee (1846), Minneapolis (1847).

=== Statehood for Ohio ===
A Federalist, St. Clair hoped to see two states made of the old Ohio Country to increase Federalist power in Congress. He was resented by Ohio Democratic-Republicans for his apparent partisanship, high-handedness and arrogance in office. In 1802, his opposition to plans for Ohio statehood led President Thomas Jefferson to remove him from office as territorial governor. He thus played no part in the organizing of the state of Ohio in 1803. The first Ohio Constitution provided for a weak governor and a strong legislature, in part a reaction to St. Clair's method of governance.

In preparation for Ohio's statehood, Congress split the Northwest Territory into two sections in 1800. A new territory, Indiana Territory, encompassed all land west of the present Indiana–Ohio border and its northward extension to Lake Superior, except for a wedge-shaped area of present-day Indiana in the southeast known as "the gore". It, along with everything east of the new territory, remained part of the Northwest Territory.

This legislation was signed into law by President John Adams on May 7, 1800, and became effective on July 4. On April 30, 1802, Congress passed an enabling act for Ohio that authorized the residents of the eastern portion of the Northwest Territory to form a state constitution and government, and be admitted to the Union. When Ohio was admitted as the 17th state on March 1, 1803, the land not included in the new state, including the gore, became part of Indiana Territory, and the Northwest Territory went out of existence.

Ongoing disputes with the British over the region were a contributing factor to the War of 1812. Britain irrevocably ceded claim to the former Northwest Territory with the Treaty of Ghent in 1814.

== Northwest Ordinance ==
The Northwest Ordinance of 1787 established the Northwest Territory, and defined its boundaries, form of government, and administrative structure. In particular, it defined the bodies of government, established the legal basis of land ownership, provided for abolition and transfer of state territorial claims, made rules for admission of new states, established public education, recognized and codified 'natural rights', prohibited slavery, and defined the land rights and applicability of laws to the Native Americans.

=== Law and government ===
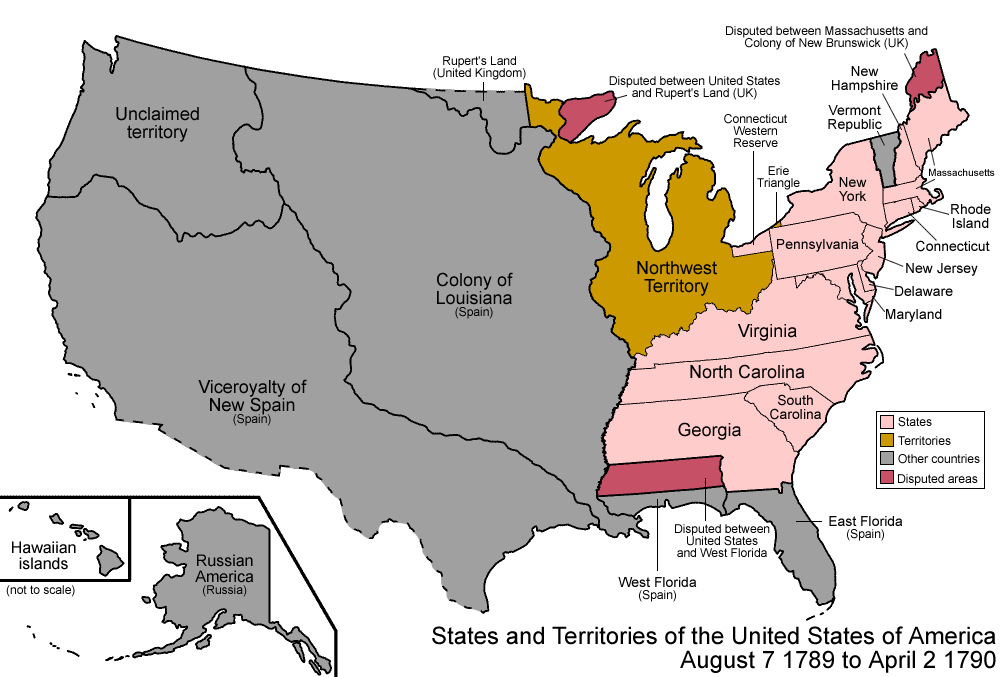
Map of the states and territories of the United States as it was on August 7, 1789, when the Northwest Territory was first organized, to April 2, 1790, when the future Southwest Territory was ceded by North Carolina

At first, the territory had a modified form of martial law. The governor was also the senior army officer within the territory, and he combined legislative and executive authority. But a supreme court was established, and he shared legislative powers with the court. County governments were organized as soon as the population was sufficient, and these assumed local administrative and judicial functions. Washington County was the first of these, at Marietta in 1788. This was an important event, as this court was the first establishment of civil and criminal law in the pioneer country.

As soon as the number of free male settlers exceeded 5,000, the territorial legislature was to be created, and this happened in 1798. The full mechanisms of government were put in place, as outlined in the Northwest Ordinance. A bicameral legislature consisted of a House of Representatives and a Council. The first House had 22 representatives, apportioned by population of each county. The House then nominated 10 citizens to be Council members. The nominations were sent to the U.S. Congress, which appointed five of them as the council. This assembly became the legislature of the Territory, although the governor retained veto power.

Article VI of the Articles of Compact within the Northwest Ordinance prohibited the owning of slaves within the Northwest Territory. Territorial governments evaded this law by use of indenture laws. The Articles of Compact prohibited legal discrimination on the basis of religion within the territory.

The township formula created by Thomas Jefferson was first implemented in the Northwest Territory through the Land Ordinance of 1785. The square surveys of the Northwest Territory became a hallmark of the Midwest, as sections, townships, counties (and states) were laid out scientifically, and land was sold quickly and efficiently (although not without some speculative aberrations).

==== Officials ====
Arthur St. Clair was the territory's governor until November 1802, when President Thomas Jefferson removed him from office and appointed Charles Willing Byrd, who served the position until Ohio became a state and elected its first governor, Edward Tiffin, on March 3, 1803. The Supreme Court consisted of (1) John Cleves Symmes; (2) James Mitchell Varnum, who died in 1789, replaced by George Turner, who resigned in 1796, and was replaced by Return Jonathan Meigs Jr.; and (3) Samuel Holden Parsons, who died in 1789, replaced by Rufus Putnam, who resigned 1796, and was replaced by Joseph Gilman. There were three secretaries: Winthrop Sargent (July 9, 1788 – May 31, 1798); William Henry Harrison (June 29, 1798 – December 31, 1799); and Charles Willing Byrd (January 1, 1800 – March 1, 1803).

The territory's first common pleas court opened at Marietta on September 2, 1788. Its first judges were General Rufus Putnam, General Benjamin Tupper, and Colonel Archibald Crary. Ebenezer Sproat was the first sheriff, Paul Fearing became the first attorney to practice in the territory, and Colonel William Stacy was foreman of the first grand jury. Griffin Greene was appointed justice of the peace.

==== Legislature ====
Once the population of free men living within the territory rose to 5000, the federal government allowed residents to elect a legislature. The legislature, or General Assembly, consisted of two houses, a Legislative Council (five members chosen by Congress) and a House of Representatives consisting of 22 members elected by the male freeholders in nine counties. The first session of the legislature was held in September 1799. Its first important task was to select a non-voting delegate to the U.S. Congress. Locked in a power struggle with Governor St. Clair, the legislature narrowly elected William Henry Harrison as the first delegate over the governor's son, Arthur St. Clair Jr. Subsequent congressional delegates were William McMillan (1800–1801) and Paul Fearing (1801–1803).

=== Land ownership ===
The Northwest Ordinance of 1787 established the concept of fee simple ownership, by which ownership was in perpetuity with unlimited power to sell or give it away.

=== Prohibition of slavery ===
The Northwest Ordinance was the first act of its kind in that it prohibited slavery throughout a U.S. territory. This act was less controversial than it may have seemed at the time, practically a rework of an earlier 1784 act that proposed gradual reduction of slavery throughout the territories. Both of these proposed acts were supported by a variety of influential members of congress including Thomas Jefferson in the hope that slavery would fade as the nation grew.

=== Native American lands ===
In regard to the Delaware (Lenape) Native Americans living in the region, Congress decided, on July 27, 1787, that 10,000 acres on the Muskingum River in the present state of Ohio would "be set apart and the property thereof be vested in the Moravian Brethren ... or a society of the said Brethren for civilizing the Native Americans and promoting Christianity."

=== Education ===
The Northwest Ordinance called for a public university for the education, settlement and eventual statehood of the frontier of Ohio and beyond. Article 3 stated, "Religion, morality, and knowledge being necessary to good government and the happiness of mankind, schools and the means of education shall forever be encouraged." The Land Ordinance of 1785 created an innovation in public education when it reserved resources for local public schools. The ordinance divided the territory into 36 mile^{2} townships, and each township was further divided into 36 one mile^{2} tracts for purposes of sale. The ordinance then stated that "there shall be reserved from sale the lot No. 16 of every township for the maintenance of public schools within the said township."

In 1801, Jefferson Academy was established in Vincennes. As Vincennes University, it remains the oldest public institution of higher learning in the Northwest Territory.

The next year, American Western University was founded in Athens, Ohio, upstream of the Hocking River, due to its location directly between Chillicothe (an original capital of Ohio) and Marietta. It was formally established on February 18, 1804, as Ohio University.

== Settlements and forts ==
Forts, garrisons and settlements established in the territory northwest of the River Ohio between 1778 and 1803 (excluding those established in Indiana Territory after 1800). They are listed by present-day location and year established or of U.S. possession. Most forts were military garrisons only. General Anthony Wayne, during his Ohio Country campaign 1792–1795, built or rebuilt 10 such forts: forts (in order by date) Lafayette, Greene Ville, Recovery, Adams, Defiance, Deposit, Wayne, Loramie, Piqua, and St. Mary's. Early settlements were outside or nearby forts: Clarksville, Vincennes, Kaskaskia (French), Losantiville, and the Ohio Company settlements at Marietta and Waterford/Beverly. Later, after the Treaty of Greenville, settlements no longer needed to be spearheaded by forts, and sprang up quickly below the Treaty Line.

Abraham Bradley's 1796 map of the United States includes many forts and settlements within the Northwest Territory.

- Fort Laurens (aka Lawrence), Ohio, 1778, now Bolivar
- Cahokia, Illinois, 1778
- Fort Gage, Kaskaskia, Illinois, 1779, an American / French settlement
- Fort Patrick Henry, Vincennes, Indiana 1779
- Clarksville, Indiana, 1783 (opposite Fort Nelson, Virginia, now Louisville, Kentucky)
- Fort Finney, Ohio, 1785, abandoned 1786 / 1787
- Fort Harmar, Ohio, 1785
- Norristown, 1785; reestablished as Jefferson, 1795, now Martins Ferry
- Fort Finney, Indiana, 1786, renamed Fort Steuben in 1791; now Jeffersonville
- Fort Steuben, Ohio, January 1787, abandoned May 1790
- * Steubenville Ohio, 1797
- Marietta, Ohio, July 1788
- Columbia, Ohio, November 1788
- Losantiville (Cincinnati), Ohio, December 1788
- North Bend, Ohio, February 1789
- Waterford and Beverly, Ohio, spring 1789
- Fort Washington, Ohio, summer 1789 (later relocated and became the Newport Barracks, KY)
- Massie's Station, Virginia Military District, 1790, renamed Manchester
- Fort Dilles, Ohio, 1790, later called Dilles Bottom
- Gallipolis, Ohio, October 1790
- Big Bottom, Ohio, December 1790 (squatter settlement, site of Big Bottom Massacre in 1791)
- Fort Frye, Ohio, January – February 1791 (not a U.S. military garrison)
- Fort Hamilton, Ohio, September 1791
- Fort Jefferson, Ohio, October 1791 (originally Fort Deposit)
- Fort St. Clair, Ohio, 1792
- Fort Greene Ville, Ohio, November 1793
- Fort Recovery, Ohio, December 1793 – March 1794
- Fort Adams, Ohio, August 1794
- Fort Massac, Illinois, June – October 1794
- Fort Defiance, Ohio, August 1794 (Battle of Fallen Timbers, August 1794)
- Fort Deposit, Ohio, September – October 1794
- Fort Wayne, Indiana, October 1794
- Fort Loramie (or Laramie), Ohio, winter 1794–95
- Fort Piqua, Ohio, winter 1794–95
- Fort St. Mary's, Ohio, October 1795
- Chillicothe, Ohio, 1796
- Cleveland, Connecticut Western Reserve, 1796
- Fort Miami, Ohio (British held until 1796)
- Fort Lernoult (previously Fort Detroit), Michigan (British held until 1796)
- Fort Mackinac, Michigan (British held until 1796)
- Williamsburg, Ohio, 1796
- Dayton, Ohio, 1796
- Newellstown, Ohio, 1796, renamed St. Clairsville
- Athens, Ohio, 1797
- Franklinton, Ohio, 1797
- Mentor, Ohio, 1797
- Warren, Ohio, 1798
- Bethel, Ohio, 1798
- Westbourne, Ohio, 1799, renamed Zanesville in 1801
- Greenfield, Ohio, 1799
- Lancaster, Ohio, 1800
- Springfield, Ohio, 1801
- Youngstown, Ohio, 1802
- Coshocton, Ohio, 1802
- Lawrenceburg, Indiana, 1802 (Within the Northwest Territory's Hamilton County until 1803)
- New Lisbon, Ohio, 1803, later renamed Lisbon
- Xenia, Ohio, 1803

== Counties ==
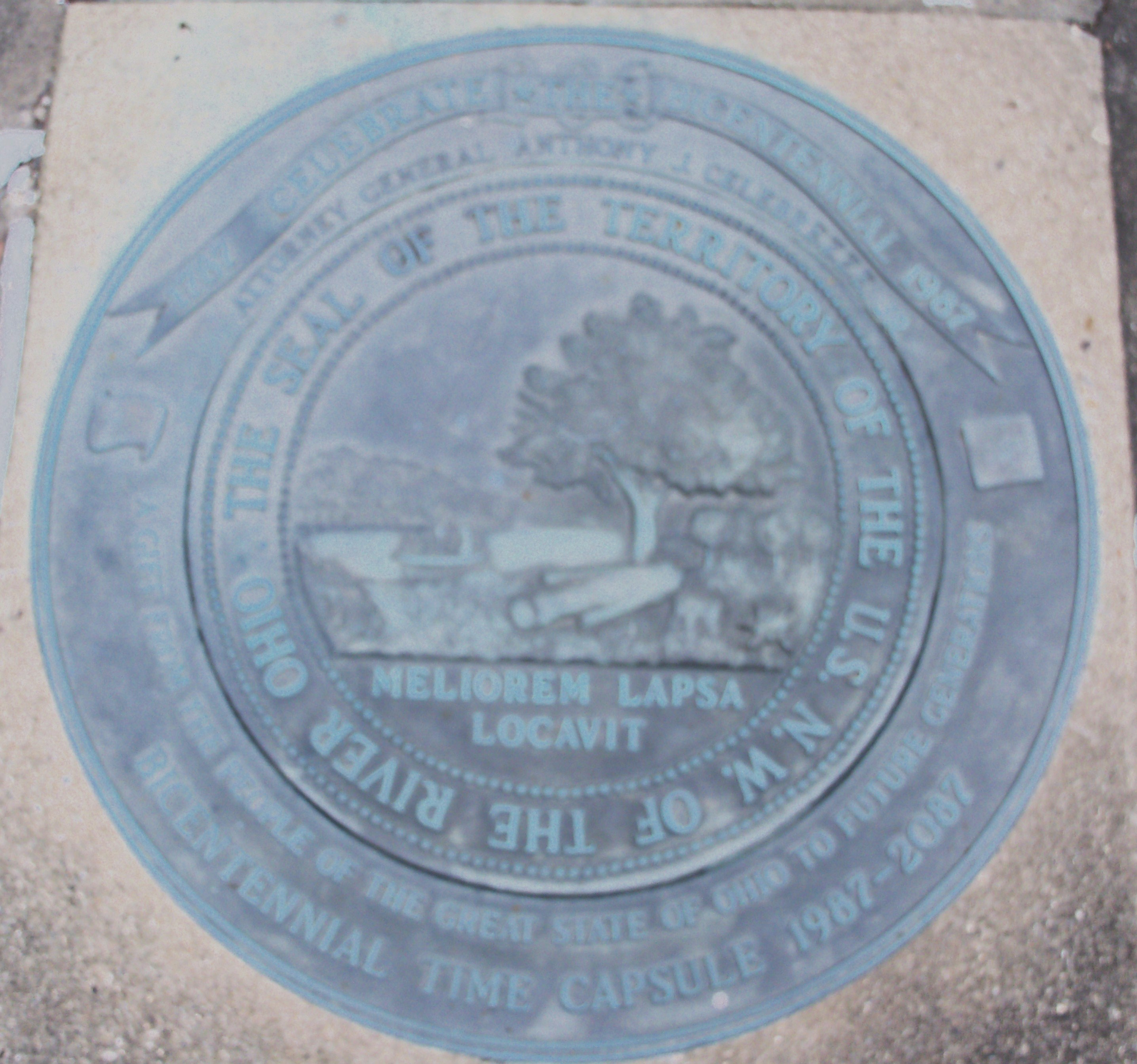
Seal of the Northwest Territory over a time capsule outside the Campus Martius Museum. The Latin phrase, "He has planted one better than the one fallen," signifies the replacement of wilderness by civilization.

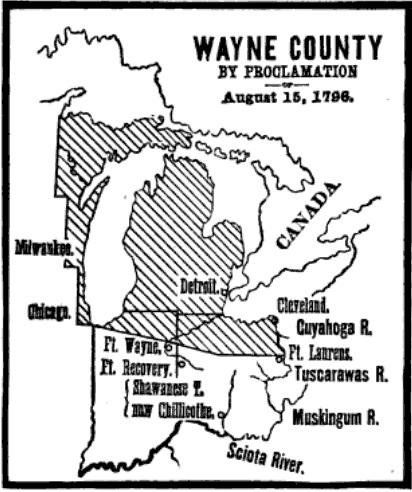
Territorial county of Wayne

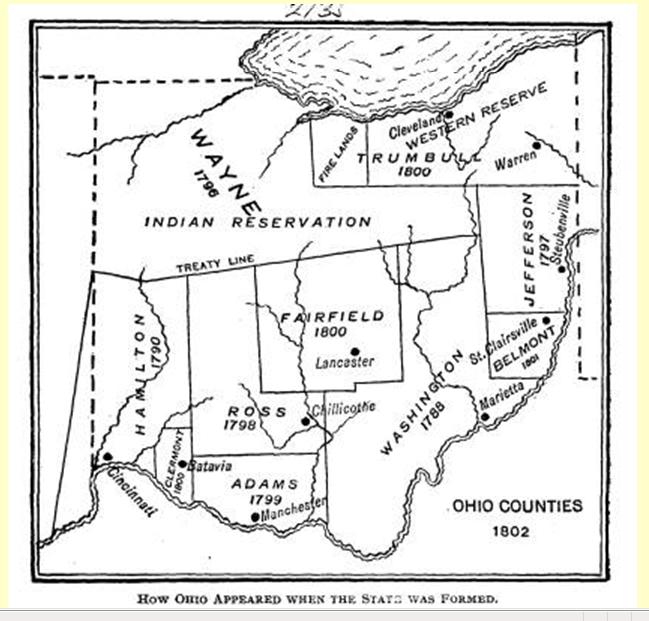
Ohio counties in 1802

Thirteen counties were formed by Governor Arthur St. Clair during the territory's existence:

- Washington County, with its seat at Marietta, was the first county formed in the territory, proclaimed on July 26, 1788, by territorial governor St. Clair. Its original boundaries were proclaimed as all of present-day Ohio east of a line extending due south from the mouth of the Cuyahoga River, but this did not take into account Connecticut's still unresolved claim of the Western Reserve. It kept these boundaries until 1796.
- Hamilton County, with its seat at Cincinnati, was proclaimed on January 2, 1790. The same proclamation officially changed Cincinnati's name from Losantiville into its present form. Its original boundaries claimed all land north of the Ohio River between the Great Miami River and Little Miami River as far north as Standing Stone Fork (now Loramie Creek), just north of present-day Piqua. In 1792 Hamilton County was expanded to encompass all lands between the mouths of the Great Miami and Cuyahoga Rivers, as well as all of what is now the Lower Peninsula of Michigan. Its territory was reduced several times after 1796.
- St. Clair County, with its seat at Kaskaskia, was proclaimed on April 27, 1790. It originally encompassed most of present-day Illinois south of the Illinois River. It lost most of its southern lands in the formation of Randolph County in 1795, necessitating the transfer of the county seat to Cahokia, but expanded to the north to take in northwest present-day Illinois and most of present-day Wisconsin in 1801 after becoming part of Indiana Territory.
- Knox County, with its seat at Vincennes, was proclaimed on June 20, 1790, and encompassed the majority of the territory's land area – all land between St. Clair County and Hamilton County, extending north to Canada.
- Randolph County was formed October 5, 1795, with its seat at Kaskaskia and encompassed the southern half of what was St. Clair County.
- Wayne County was formed on August 15, 1796, out of portions of Hamilton County and unorganized land, with its seat at Detroit, which had been evacuated by the British five weeks previously. Wayne County originally covered all of Michigan's Lower Peninsula, northwestern Ohio, northern Indiana and a small portion of the present Lake Michigan shoreline, including the site of present-day Chicago. On November 1, 1798, it was split into the four townships of Detroit, Hamtramck, Mackinaw, and Sargent. The lands west of the extension of the present Indiana-Ohio border became part of Indiana Territory in 1800; the eastern portion of the county's land in Ohio were folded into Trumbull County that same year. The territory north of the Ordinance Line became part of Indiana Territory in 1803 as a reorganized Wayne County; the remainder reverted to unorganized status after Ohio statehood.
- Adams County was formed on July 10, 1797, with its seat at Manchester; it encompassed most of present-day south-central Ohio.
- Jefferson County was formed July 29, 1797, with its seat at Steubenville, carved out of Washington County and originally encompassed all of what is now northeastern Ohio.
- Ross County was organized on August 20, 1798, with its seat at Chillicothe and was carved out of portions of Knox, Hamilton and Washington counties.

Knox, Randolph and St. Clair counties were separated from the territory effective July 4, 1800, and, along with the western part of Wayne County, and unorganized lands in what are now Minnesota and Wisconsin, became the Indiana Territory.

- Trumbull County was proclaimed July 10, 1800, out of the Western Reserve portion of Jefferson and Wayne Counties, with its county seat at Warren, chosen over rivals Cleveland and Youngstown.
- Clermont County was formed December 6, 1800, out of Hamilton County, with its seat at Williamsburg. In contrast with most other Northwest Territory counties, Clermont County's original boundaries are only slightly larger than its present-day limits.
- Fairfield County was proclaimed December 9, 1800, formed out of Ross and Washington counties, with its seat at Lancaster.
- Belmont County was proclaimed September 7, 1801, formed out of Washington and Jefferson counties, with its seat at St. Clairsville.

The Northwest Territory ceased to exist upon Ohio statehood on March 1, 1803; the lands in Ohio that were previously part of Wayne County but not included in Trumbull County reverted to an unorganized status until new counties could be formed. The remainder of Wayne County, roughly the eastern half of the Lower Peninsula of Michigan and the eastern tip of the Upper Peninsula, was attached to Indiana Territory. A sliver of Hamilton County along the southwestern border (the Greenville Treaty line) comprising a portion of the Whitewater River drainage basin and known as "The Gore" was also ceded to Indiana Territory.

== See also ==
- Historic regions of the United States
- Old Southwest, analogous lands south of the Ohio River
- Zane's trace
