= Picketed Point Stockade =

Picketed Point
- Part of the Northwest Territory of the United States
- Marietta, Ohio
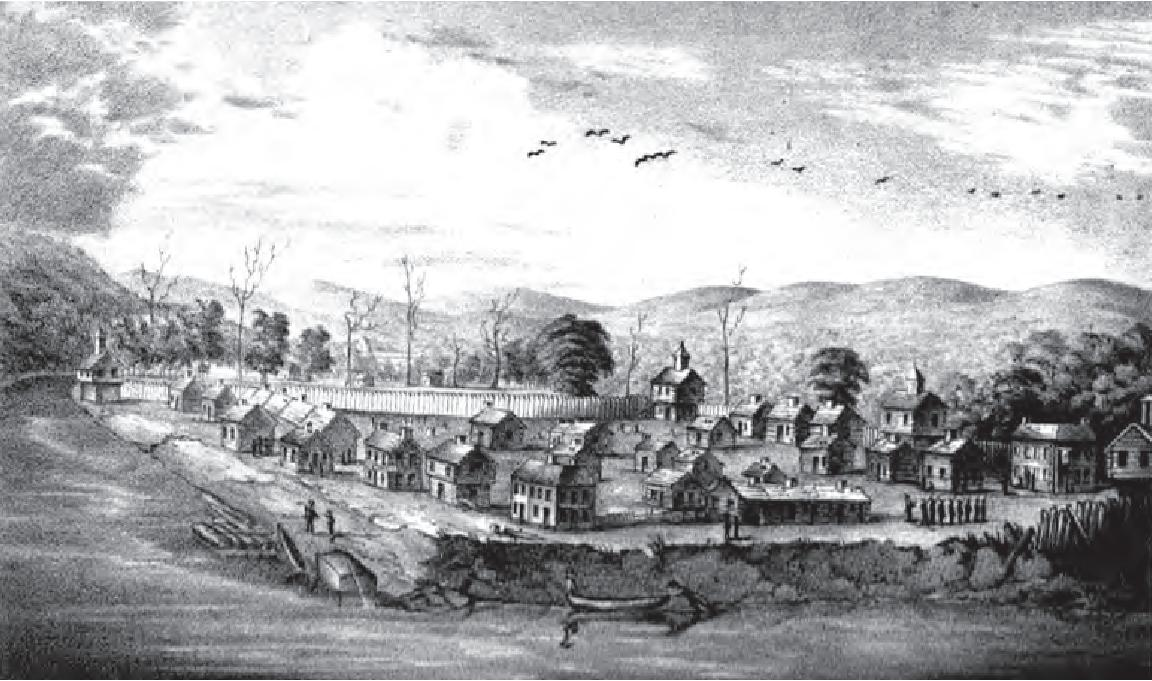
- Picketed Point stockade at Marietta, Ohio

Site history
- Built: 1791
- Built by: William Stacy, Ebenezer Sproat
- Battles/wars: Northwest Indian War

Garrison information
- Occupants: Ohio Company of Associates

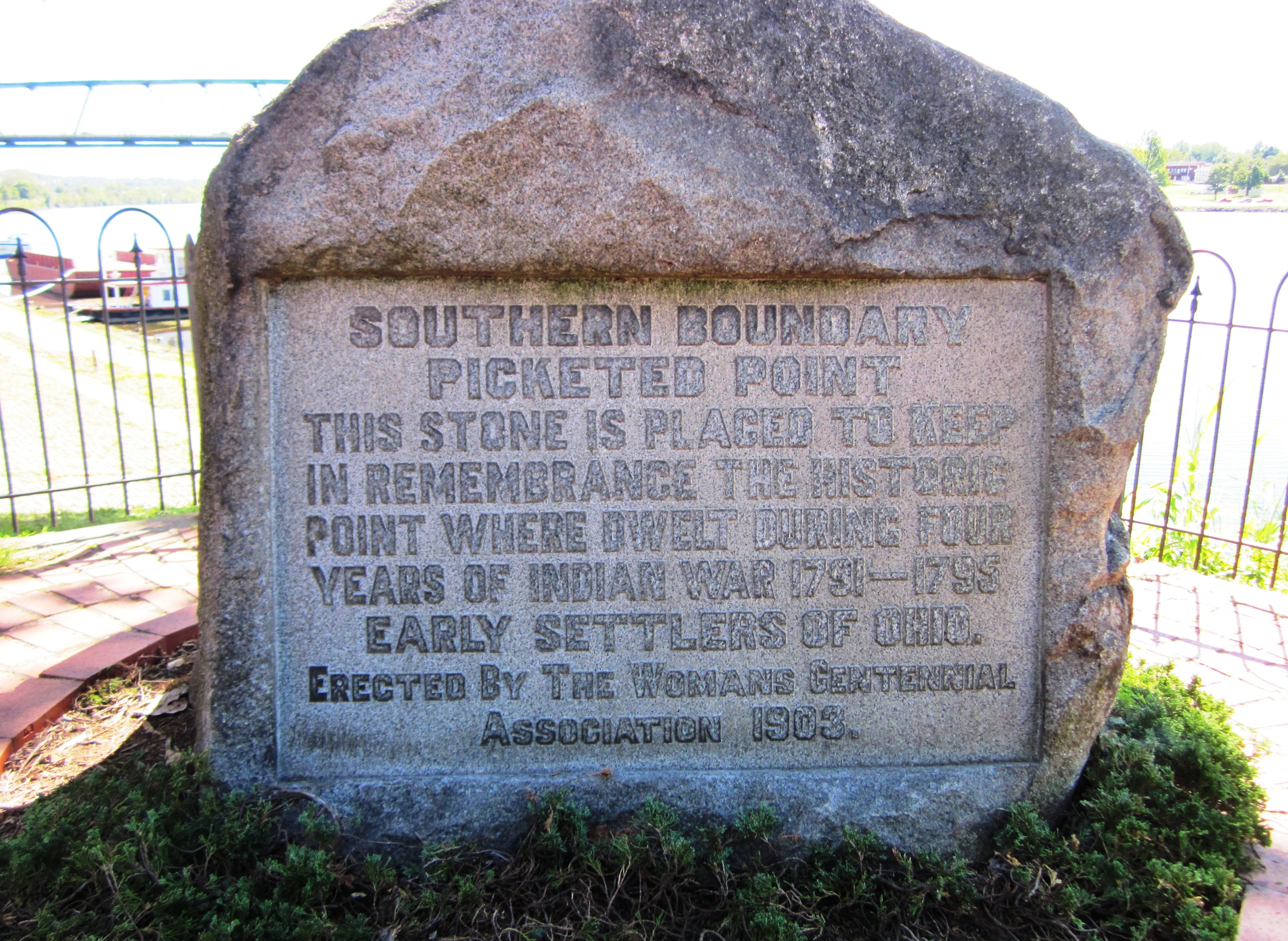
Picketed Point marker at Marietta, Ohio

Picketed Point Stockade was the last of three fortifications built at Marietta, Ohio. This defensive stockade was built by pioneers during the Northwest Indian War in 1791 on the east side of the mouth of the Muskingum River at its confluence with the Ohio River, and directly across the Muskingum from Fort Harmar. Colonel William Stacy superintended the construction of the stockade under direction of Colonel Ebenezer Sproat. Palisades or pickets were set from the Muskingum River eastward, meeting in the northeast corner of the fortification with another line of pickets built from the Ohio River northward, enclosing about four acres.

Three block houses were immediately built: one on the Muskingum bank, at the western termination of the pickets; one in the northeast corner of the inclosure; and one on the Ohio bank. Near to the latter, and by that on the Muskingum, were strong gates, of a size to admit teams, the approaches to which were commanded by the block houses. These block houses were surmounted by sentry boxes, or turrets, the sides of which were secured with thick planks for the defense of the men when on guard.

A fourth block house was built during the war by a detachment of United States troops. It was occupied by the United States troops, who kept a sentry, and assisted in guarding the garrison until sent down the Ohio to join General Anthony Wayne.

Picketed Point was located on the point which is here, although river banks can shift significantly.

There were two other nearby forts. Fort Harmar was constructed several years earlier in 1785, on the west side of the mouth of the Muskingum. The other Marietta fortification was Campus Martius, upriver on the east side of the Muskingum.

Two additional forts, somewhat distant from Marietta, were also built by settlers from the Ohio Company of Associates. A group of associates moved about 15 miles down the Ohio River from Marietta, opposite the mouth of the Little Kanawha River; the settlers constructed the fortification of Farmer's Castle for protection during the Indian war at the site of modern-day Belpre, Ohio. Another group of associates moved about 20 miles up the Muskingum River from Marietta, near the mouth of Wolf Creek; they built Fort Frye for protection during the war at the site of modern-day Beverly, Ohio.

== See also ==
- American pioneers to the Northwest Territory
- Ohio Company of Associates

== Bibliography ==
- Hildreth, S. P.: Pioneer History: Being an Account of the First Examinations of the Ohio Valley, and the Early Settlement of the Northwest Territory, H. W. Derby and Co., Cincinnati, Ohio (1848).

39°24′38″N 81°27′15″W
