= Fort Frye =

- Part of the Northwest Territory of the United States
- Beverly, Ohio
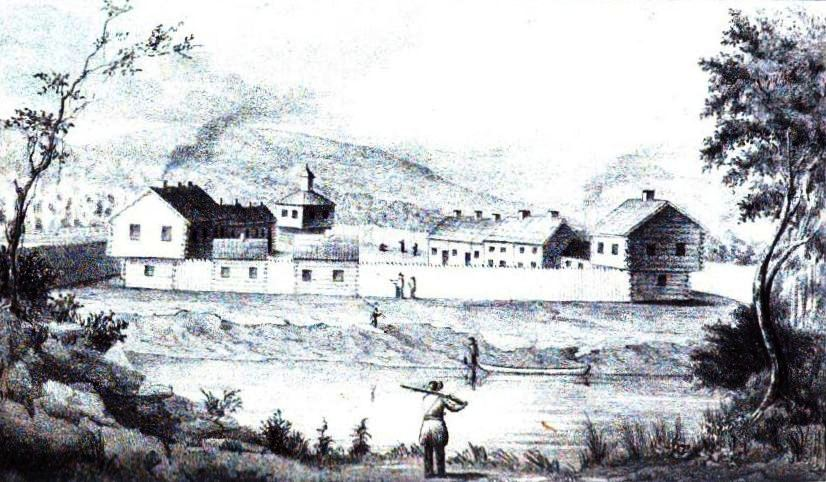
- Fort Frye at Beverly, Ohio

Location
- Coordinates: 39°32′42″N 81°38′10″W

Site history
- Built: 1791
- Built by: Joseph Frye
- Battles/wars: Northwest Indian War

Garrison information
- Past commanders: William Gray
- Occupants: Ohio Company of Associates

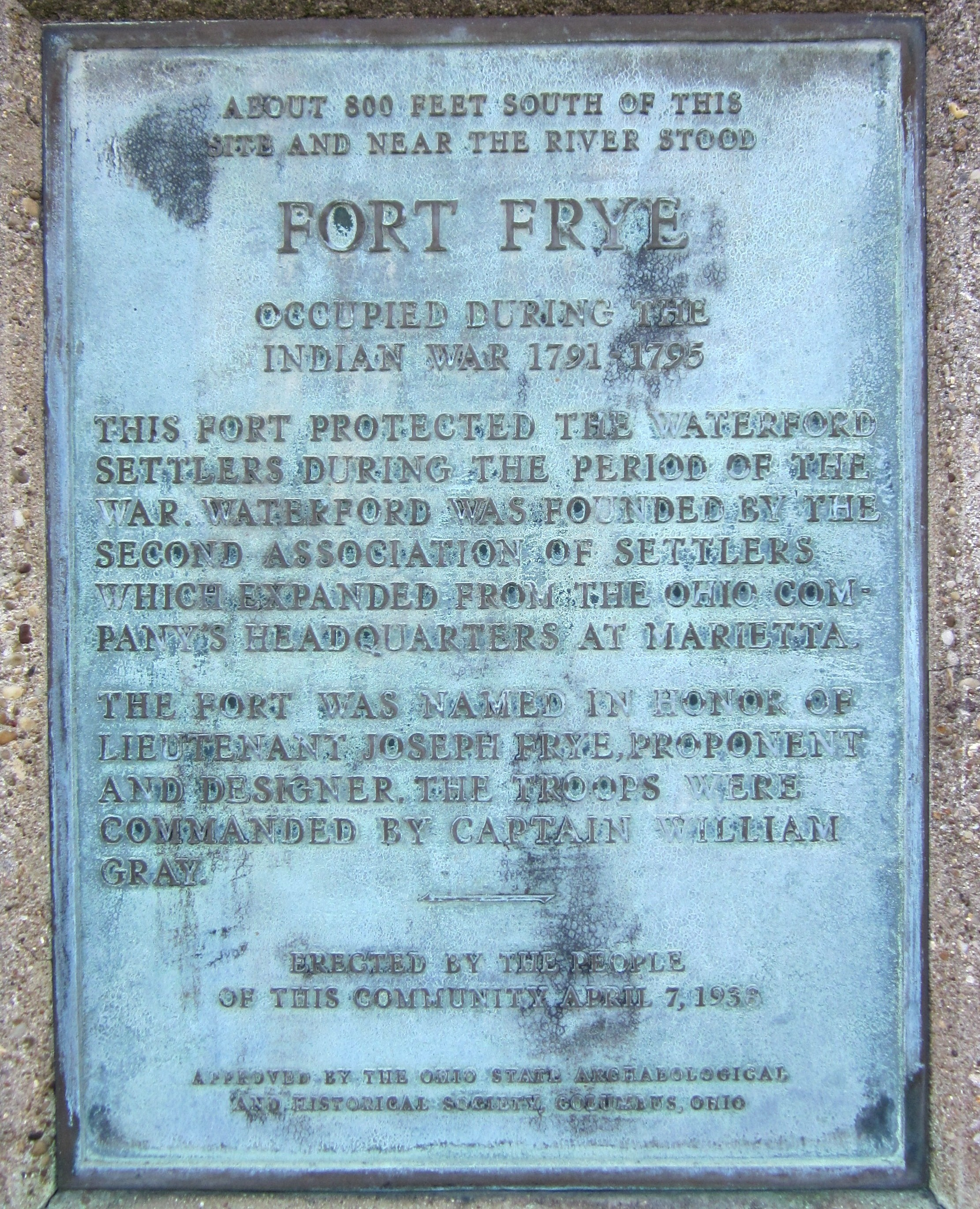
Fort Frye plaque at Beverly, Ohio

Fort Frye was a triangular defensive fortification built by a group of pioneers from the Ohio Company of Associates who moved about twenty miles up the Muskingum River from the settlement of Marietta, Ohio to a location near the mouth of Wolf Creek. During 1789 the pioneers established settlements now known as Waterford and Beverly on the southwest and northeast banks of the Muskingum, respectively. The settlements were located about 13 miles downriver from a small group of pioneers at Big Bottom. During January and February 1791, following the massacre at Big Bottom and the start of the Northwest Indian War, the settlers built Fort Frye at Beverly.

The form of the fort was triangular, which is rather uncommon in military defenses. But as they were in a hurry, and it saved them one line of curtains, while the block houses at the angles defended the sides just as well as in any other form, it was adopted. The base of the triangle rested on the river, distant only a few paces from the bank, and was about two hundred feet in length. One of the other sides was somewhat longer, so that the work was not a regular triangle. At each corner, was a two story block house, twenty feet square below, and a foot or two more above. The two longer sides were filled in with dwelling houses, some of which were two stories high, and others of a lesser height, while a considerable portion were built barrack fashion, with only one roof, pitched inward, so that the rain from it fell within the garrison. The spaces not occupied by buildings were filled in with stout pickets. Broad, substantial gates, near the northern block house, led out through the palisades into the highway and fields, while a smaller one in the curtain on the bank, called the water gate, afforded an opening to the river. A line of palisades, twelve feet high, at the distance of thirty feet, inclosed the whole, and descended to the river.

== Regional forts ==
Down the Muskingum River at Marietta, at the confluence of the Muskingum and Ohio rivers, United States troops built Fort Harmar, and the Ohio Company of Associates built Campus Martius and Picketed Point Stockade. Down the Ohio River from Marietta, associates built Farmer's Castle at the location of modern-day Belpre, Ohio.

== See also ==
- American pioneers to the Northwest Territory
- Ohio Company of Associates

== Bibliography ==
- Hildreth, S. P.: Pioneer History: Being an Account of the First Examinations of the Ohio Valley, and the Early Settlement of the Northwest Territory, H. W. Derby and Co., Cincinnati, Ohio (1848).
