= Campus Martius (Ohio) =

- Part of the Northwest Territory of the United States
- Marietta, Ohio
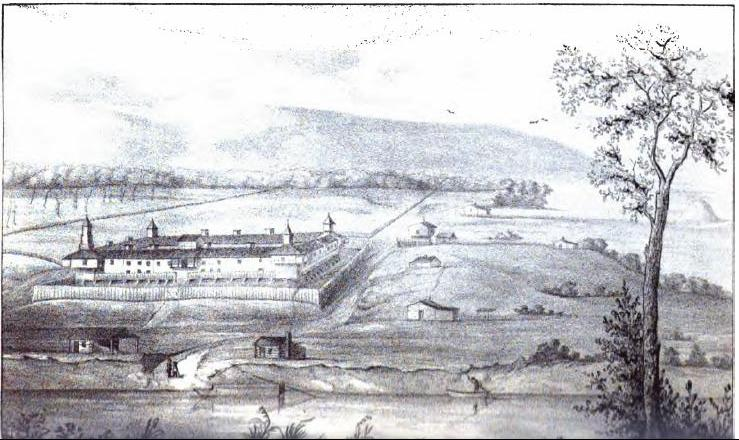
- Campus Martius fortification at Marietta, Ohio

Site history
- Built: 1788–91
- Battles/wars: Northwest Indian War

Garrison information
- Past commanders: Rufus Putnam, Anselm Tupper
- Occupants: Ohio Company of Associates

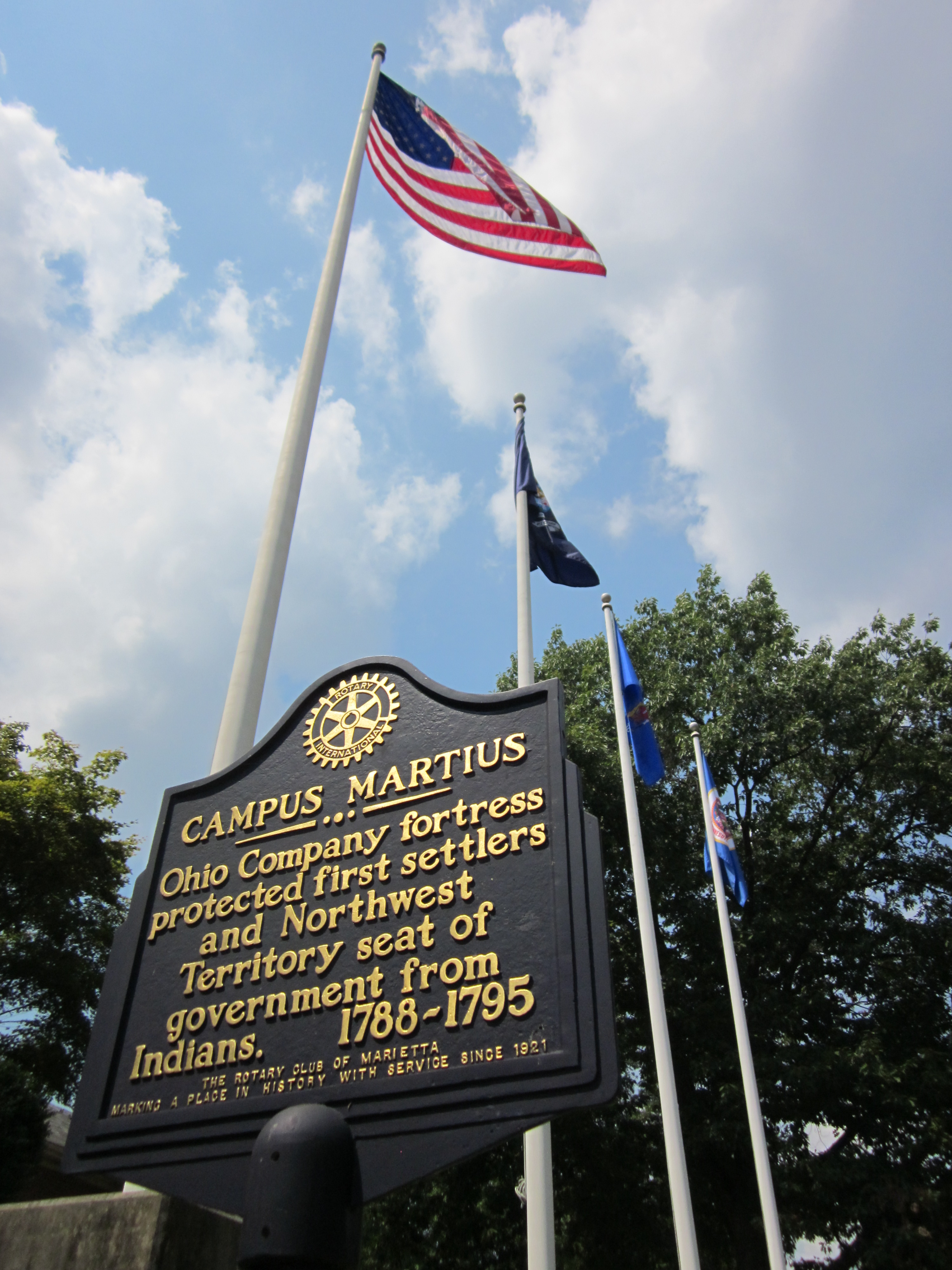
Campus Martius plaque at Marietta, Ohio

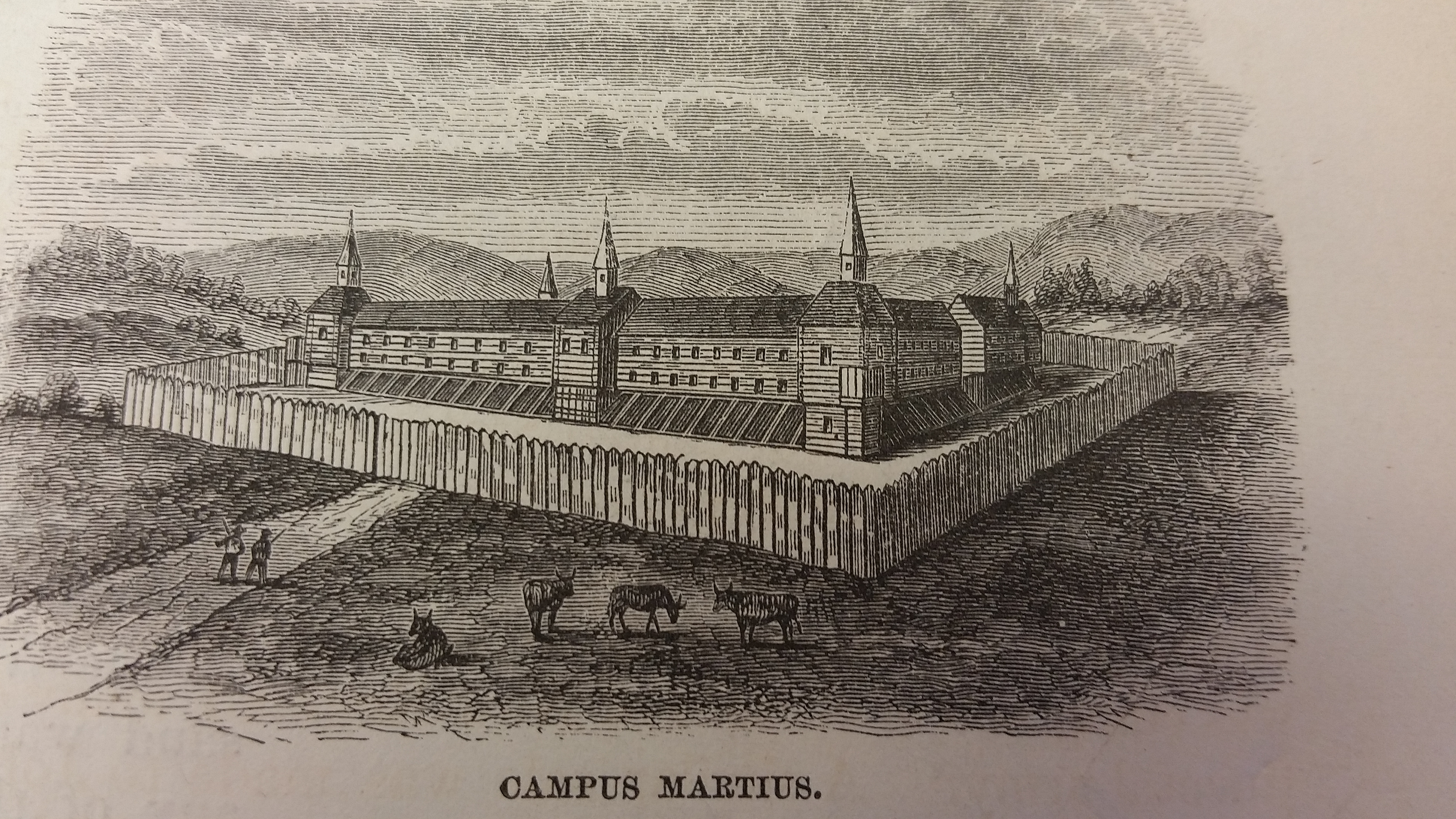
Campus Martius

Campus Martius was a defensive fortification at the Marietta, Ohio settlement. It was home to Rufus Putnam, Benjamin Tupper, Arthur St. Clair, and other pioneers from the Ohio Company of Associates during the Northwest Indian War. Major Anselm Tupper was commander of the Campus Martius during the war. Construction began in 1788 and was fully completed in 1791. The Campus Martius was located on the east side of the Muskingum River and upriver from its confluence with the Ohio River. A firsthand description of the fort is provided in Hildreth's Pioneer History,

Campus Martius is the most handsome pile of buildings on this side of the Alleghany mountains, and in a few days, it will be the strongest fortification in the territory of the United States. It stands on the margin of the elevated plain on which are the remains of the ancient works [mounds], mentioned in my letter of May last, thirty feet above the high bank of the Muskingum, twenty-nine perches distant from the river, and two hundred and seventy-six from the Ohio. It consists of a regular square, with a block house at each angle, eighteen feet square on the ground, and two stories high; the upper story is on the outside or face, jutting over the lower one, eighteen inches. These blockhouses serve as bastions to a regular fortification of four sides. The curtains comprise dwelling houses two stories high, eighteen feet wide, and of different lengths.

The Campus Martius Museum now occupies the Campus Martius site. The Rufus Putnam House, part of the original Campus, is enclosed in the museum. Campus Martius was located around 39°25′17″N 81°27′40″W.

== Other Marietta forts ==
The other fortification at the Marietta settlement was the Picketed Point Stockade, built by associates in 1791 on the east side of the mouth of the Muskingum River at its confluence with the Ohio and directly across the Muskingum from Fort Harmar. Fort Harmar was constructed several years earlier, in 1785, by United States troops on the west side of the mouth of the Muskingum River.

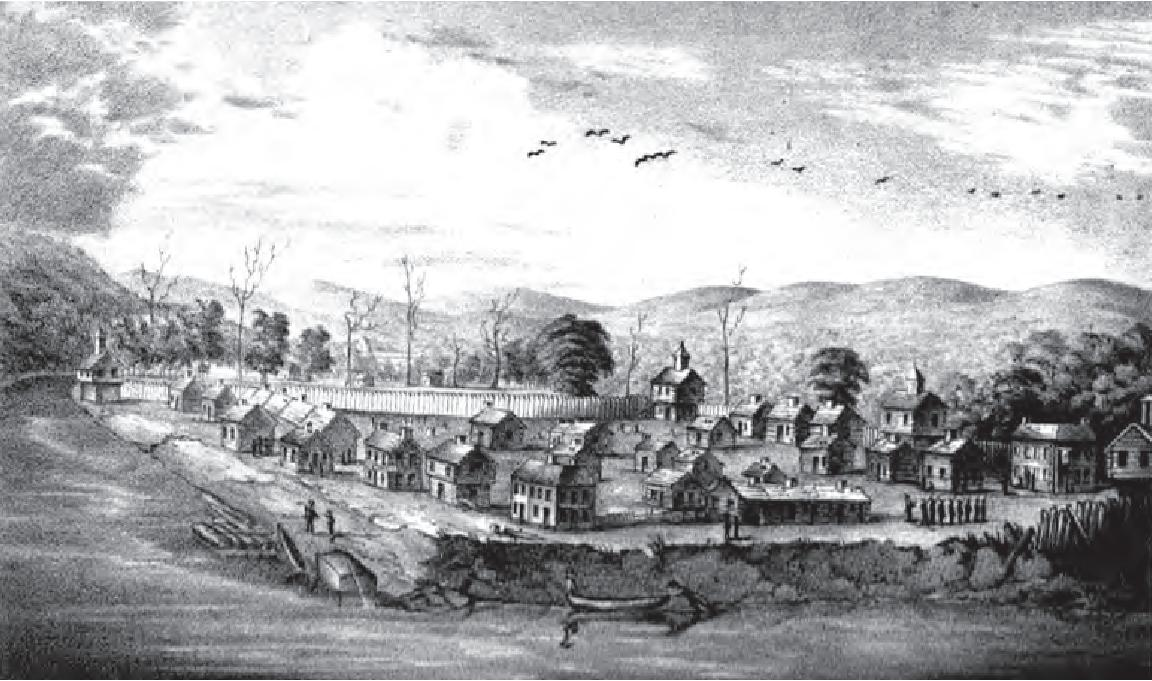
Picketed Point

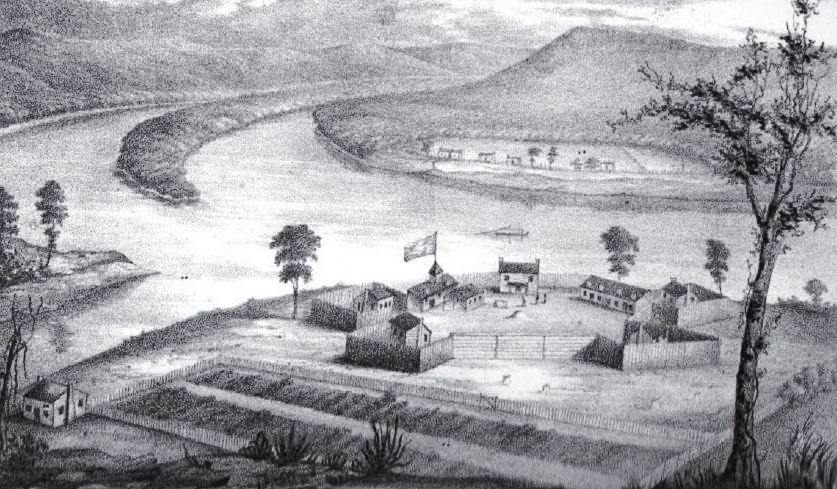
Fort Harmar

== Regional forts ==
Two additional forts, distant from Marietta, were also built by settlers from the Ohio Company of Associates. A group of associates moved about 15 miles down the Ohio River from Marietta, opposite the mouth of the Little Kanawha River; the settlers constructed the fortification of Farmer's Castle for protection during the Indian War at the site of modern-day Belpre, Ohio.

Another group of associates moved about 20 miles up the Muskingum River from Marietta, near the mouth of Wolf Creek; they built Fort Frye for protection during the war at the site of modern-day Beverly, Ohio.

== See also ==
- American pioneers to the Northwest Territory
- Ohio Company of Associates

== Bibliography ==
- Cutler, Julia Perkins (1888). The Founders of Ohio, Brief Sketches of the Forty-Eight Pioneers. Cincinnati, Ohio: Robert Clarke and Company.
- Hildreth, S. P. (1848). Pioneer History: Being an Account of the First Examinations of the Ohio Valley, and the Early Settlement of the Northwest Territory. Cincinnati, Ohio: H. W. Derby and Co.
- Howe, Henry (1891). Historical Collections of Ohio. Vol. III. Columbus, Ohio: Henry Howe and Son.
