= Fort Finney (Ohio) =

1786 treaty between the United States and Shawnee leaders

Coordinates: 39°06′52″N 84°48′02″W

Fort Finney was a fort built in October 1785 at the mouth of the Great Miami River near the modern city of Cincinnati and named for Major Walter Finney who built the fort. The site was chosen to be midway between Falls of the Ohio and Limestone (Maysville), two early settlements on the Ohio River. Earlier, George Washington had commissioned Generals George Rogers Clark, Richard Butler and Samuel Parsons to make a peace treaty with the Shawnee Indians, and a fort was needed to secure the territory. A company under Major Finney was dispatched in fall, 1785 from Fort Pitt to build the fort.

The fort was abandoned sometime before the Symmes Purchase in 1788. Today, the site is the coal yard of the Miami Fort Power Station.

== Treaty of Fort Finney ==
The Treaty of Fort Finney, also known as the Treaty at the Mouth of the Great Miami, was signed on January 31, 1786, at Fort Finney between the United States and Shawnee leaders after the American Revolutionary War and ceded parts of the Ohio country to the United States. The treaty was reluctantly signed by the Shawnees and later renounced by other Shawnee leaders. The Northwest Indian War soon followed.

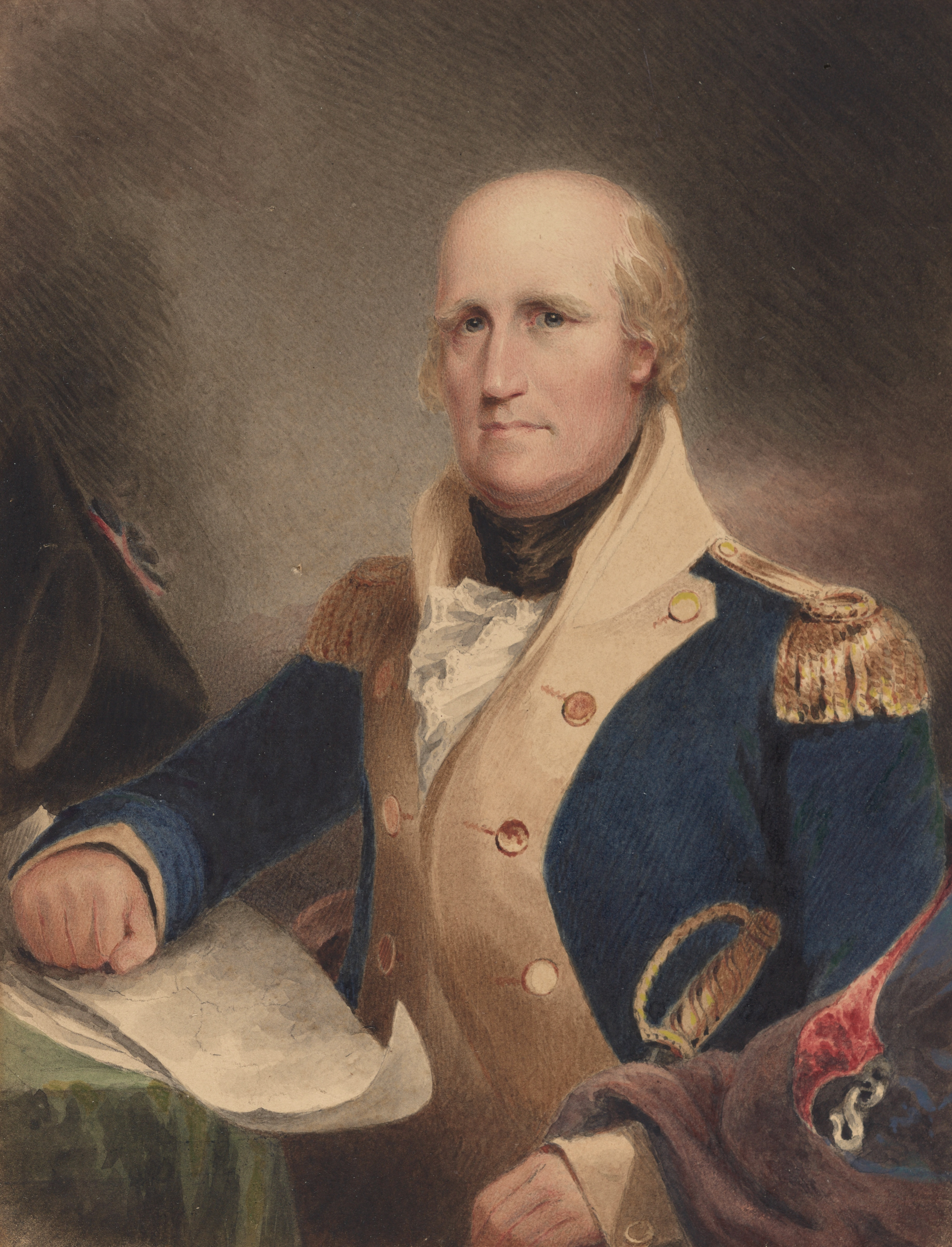
Treaty signer General George Rogers Clark

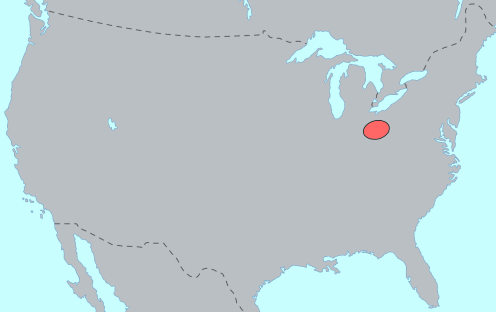
Shawnee distribution around 1755

== See also ==
- Treaty of Fort Stanwix (1784)
- Treaty of Fort McIntosh
