= Treaty of Fort Harmar =

1789 treaty

Treaty Between the United States and the Six Nations at Fort Harmar
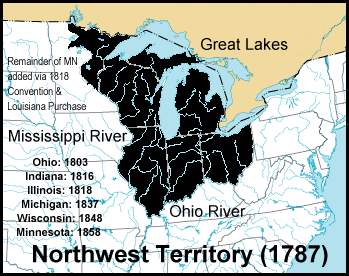
- Signed: January 9, 1789
- Location: Fort Harmar
- Language: English

The Treaty of Fort Harmar (1789) was a treaty made between the United States and the Haudenosaunee, Ojibwe, Odawa, Potawatomi, Sauk, Wyandot, and Lenape, all Indigenous nations with territorial claims within the European land claim acquired in 1783 by the United States from the Kingdom of Great Britain known as the Northwest Territory.

== History ==
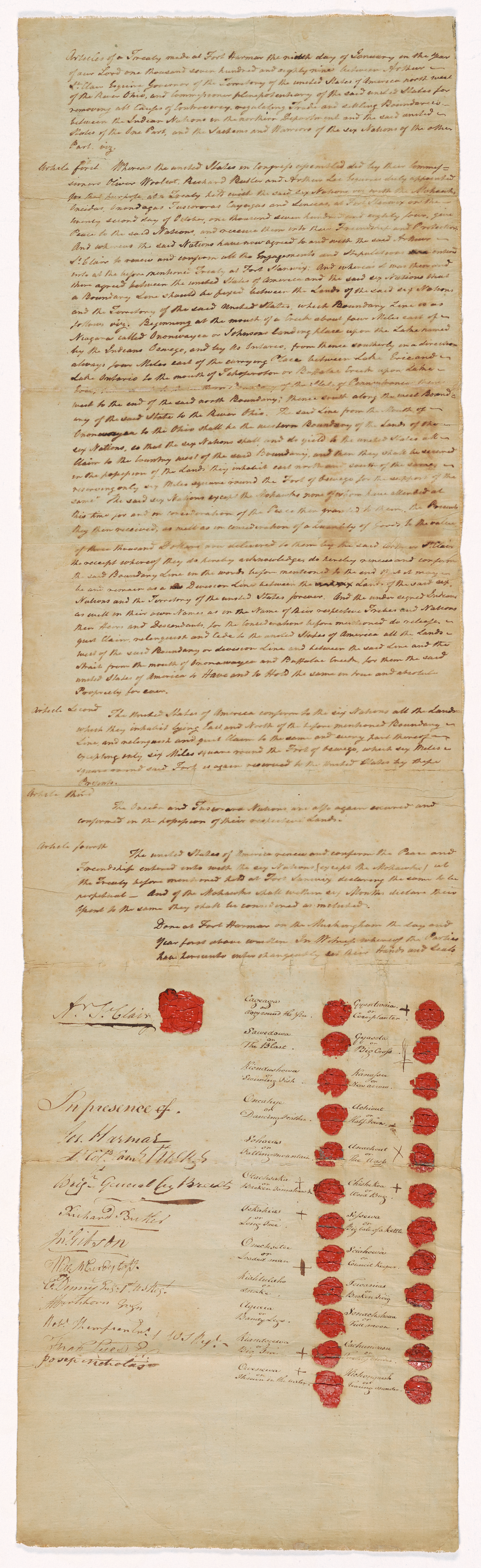
The Treaty of Fort Harmar, National Archives.

The Treaty of Fort Harmar was concluded at Fort Harmar in the Northwest Territory on January 9, 1789. National leaders representing the Haudenosaunee, Ojibwe, Odawa, Potawatomi, Sauk, Wyandot, and Lenape met with treaty negotiators from the United States, including Arthur St. Clair, governor of the Northwest Territory, Josiah Harmar, and Richard Butler.

Although the treaty was supposed to address issues with two earlier treaties, the 1784 Treaty of Fort Stanwix and the 1785 Treaty of Fort McIntosh, it largely reiterated the earlier terminology, with minor changes. The treaty failed to address the most important grievances of the Indigenous nations, namely, the unauthorized settlement of White Americans in the Firelands region of the Western Reserve, which extended into the territory set aside for the Indigenous nations.

Arthur St. Clair was authorized by Congress to offer to exchange other land reserved for U.S. settlements for the disputed Firelands of the Western Reserve. St. Clair refused to give up these lands. Instead, St. Clair negotiated a treaty that simply reiterated the terms of previous treaties through means of bribery and threats. Many leaders of Indigenous nations met prior to the negotiations to determine an appropriate strategy. Joseph Brant, a Haudenosaunee leader, offered a compromise position which moved the boundary line to the Muskingum River. After other Indigenous leaders rejected this compromise, Brant sent St. Clair a letter asking for early concessions. St. Clair refused and accused Brant of acting for the Kingdom of Great Britain. Brant decided to boycott negotiations with the United States and suggested others do the same. Further deteriorating the situation was the murder of a Haudenosaunee leader named by Tegunteh by a White man named Lewis Wetzel. Although Wetzel was twice arrested for the crime, U.S. authorities never punished him. Several nations, including the Shawnee and Miami, refused to participate as a result of St. Clair's belligerence, and therefore were not bound by the treaty.

The treaty failed to stop the violence in the region caused by the encroachment of White Americans onto territories held by Indigenous nations. Many nations were infuriated at the treaty because they perceived the treaty to force land cessions and foreign sovereignty over. The failure of the treaty led to an escalation of the hostilities as the Western Confederacy resisted the United States invasion. The war would continue for six years and see thousands killed, including some of the worst defeats in U.S. Army history, until the United States defeated the Indigenous alliance at the Battle of Fallen Timbers in 1794.

In the 1795 Treaty of Greenville, the nations were forced to give up 3/4 of their lands within what is now Ohio. This treaty divided the Northwest Territory into two parts — one for citizens of Indigenous nations and one for United States citizens.

== See also ==
- Fort Harmar
- List of treaties
- Northwest Indian War
