= Treaty of Fort McIntosh =

1785 treaty between Native Americans and the United States

The Treaty of Fort McIntosh was a treaty between the United States government and representatives of the Wyandot, Delaware, Ojibwe and Odawa nations of Native Americans. The treaty was signed at Fort McIntosh (present Beaver, Pennsylvania) on January 21, 1785. It contained 10 articles and an addendum.

In a follow-up to the earlier Treaty of Fort Stanwix (1784) of October 22, 1784, (at Fort Stanwix, near modern Rome, New York), where the Seneca nation of Native Americans had given up claims in the eastern extension of the Ohio Country beyond the Ohio River into northern Pennsylvania, the American federal government sought a treaty with the remaining tribes having claims in the rest of the Ohio Country, west of the Ohio River. The United States sent a team of diplomats including George Rogers Clark, Richard Butler, and Arthur Lee to negotiate a new treaty. In January 1785, the representatives of the two sides met at Fort McIntosh at the confluence of the Ohio and Beaver Rivers in Western Pennsylvania. Most of the Native Americans who signed the treaty were not actually given authority by their nations to make negotiations, which is why later chiefs questioned and doubted the legality and moral authority of the land give-away agreements. Two states of the original Thirteen Colonies on the East Coast had residual territorial land claims in the Ohio Country that needed to be relinquished: Connecticut's (Western Reserve in the northeast of Ohio, near Lake Erie) and the Commonwealth of Virginia's Military District in the central south of Ohio. At that time, there were no organized incursions yet of American settlers into the Ohio Country. The nearest outpost was Wheeling on the Ohio River roughly 87 miles (140 km) downstream from Pittsburgh. The founding of Marietta, the first permanent white settlement in what is now Ohio, was still several years away. Fort Harmar at the confluence of the Ohio and Muskingum would not be built for many more months.

Essentially, the treaty carved a large Indigenous reservation out of the Ohio Country, whose boundaries were the Cuyahoga and Muskingum rivers in the east, a line between Fort Laurens and Fort Pickawillany (Piqua, Ohio) in the south, the Great Miami River and St. Marys River (Indiana and Ohio) in the west, and the Maumee River and Lake Erie to the north. This area comprised about 1/3 of the modern day state of Ohio in the northwest, and a wedge of eastern Indiana extending to Kekionga (future Fort Wayne). Areas outside the boundary in eastern and southern Ohio belonged to the white men Americans. The tribes also ceded areas surrounding Forts Shelby and Detroit and Fort Michilimackinac to the far north in the Great Lakes, between Lake Superior, Huron and Michigan, to the United States and also searched for and gave back white captives taken in earlier raids along the frontier.

Most Ohio Country tribes did not subscribe to the treaty, particularly the Shawnee who lost all of their lands in southwestern Ohio. The treaty seeded and led to the later formation of the Western Confederacy of natives later the same year. Settlers as well as Native Americans encroaching on the boundary line presaged the Northwest Indian War of 1785–1795. An almost identical Treaty line, except the extension in Indiana, was later circumscribed in the later Treaty of Greenville, negotiated and forced onto the tribes following the conclusion of the war.

== See also ==
- List of United States treaties § U.S.–Native American treaties
- Treaty of Fort Harmar, a reiteration of the terms
- Firelands, a disputed region of the Connecticut Western Reserve west of the Treaty Line
- Treaty of Fort Industry that acquired the Firelands region and ended the conflict there
