= Treaty of Fort Stanwix (1784) =

1784 treaty between the U.S. and the Haudenosaunee League

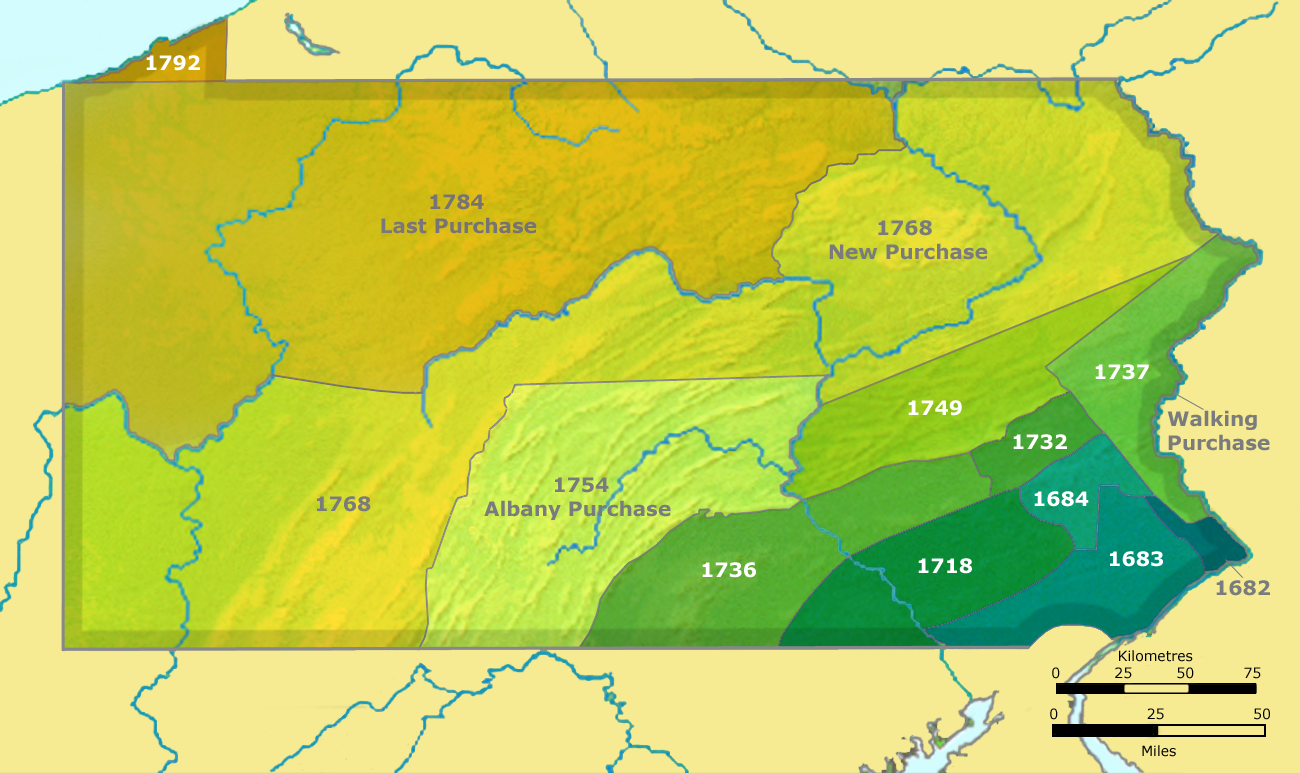
Map showing Pennsylvania and the territory involved in the two purchases of 1768 and 1784.

The Treaty of Fort Stanwix was a treaty finalized on October 22, 1784, between the United States and Native Americans from the six nations of the Haudenosaunee League. It was signed at Fort Stanwix, in present-day Rome, New York, and was the first of several treaties between Native Americans and the United States after the American victory in the Revolutionary War.

Following the Revolutionary War, the British ceded their claims in North America to the American government, against the desire of their Native American allies. As a result, the status of Indian lands was ignored in the Treaty of Paris, which was the peace and land settlement between the British and the American colonies. Many Haudenosaunee fled to Canada after the Revolution in order to continue receiving British support. Later, some of the Haudenosaunee returned to their home in the Ohio region. Those that returned often got into violent conflict with colonists trying to settle the area. The Treaty of Fort Stanwix was intended to serve as a peace treaty between the Americans and the Haudenosaunee, as well as secure other Indian lands farther west, which the Haudenosaunee had gained by conquest during the Beaver Wars in the last century. Joseph Brant was the leading Haudenosaunee at the start of negotiations. He said, "But we must observe to you, that we are sent in order to make peace, and that we are not authorized, to stipulate any particular cession of lands." Brant had to leave early for a planned trip to England. The leading Indian representatives who signed the treaty were Cornplanter and Captain Aaron Hill. In this treaty, the Haudenosaunee Confederacy ceded all claims to the Ohio territory, a strip of land along the Niagara river and all land west of mouth of Buffalo creek. In Pennsylvania, the land acquired in this treaty is known as the "Last Purchase".

The Six Nations council at Buffalo Creek refused to ratify the treaty, denying that their delegates had the power to give away such large tracts of land and asked the Americans for return of the deeds and promised to indemnify them for any presents they had given. The general Indian confederacy also disavowed the treaty because most of the Six Nations did not live in the Ohio territory. The Ohio Country natives, including the Shawnee Indians, the Seneca-Cayuga, the Lenape (Delaware) and several other tribes, rejected the treaty. A series of treaties and land sales with these tribes soon followed:

- 1785 Treaty of Fort McIntosh with Wyandotte, Delaware, Chippewa and Ottawa leaders for lands in Ohio
- 1786 Treaty of Fort Finney with Shawnee leaders for portions of Ohio
- 1788 Phelps and Gorham Purchase with the Haudenosaunee for lands in New York State east of the Genesee River
- 1789 Treaty of Fort Harmar reiterating claims in Ohio
- 1794 Treaty of Canandaigua establishing peace with the Haudenosaunee and affirming lands rights in New York State east of the Genesee River
- 1797 Treaty of Big Tree with the Haudenosaunee for lands in New York State west of the Genesee River

The Treaty of Fort Stanwix was a significant blow to the Haudenosaunee. The Revolutionary War had significantly weakened the strength of the confederacy, and the negotiations at the Treaty of Fort Stanwix served to further divide them. After the war, the Haudenosaunee never returned to their former influential status.

== See also ==
- Haldimand Proclamation
