= Fort Harmar =

Frontier wooden fort in Ohio

- Part of the Northwest Territory of the United States
- Marietta, Ohio
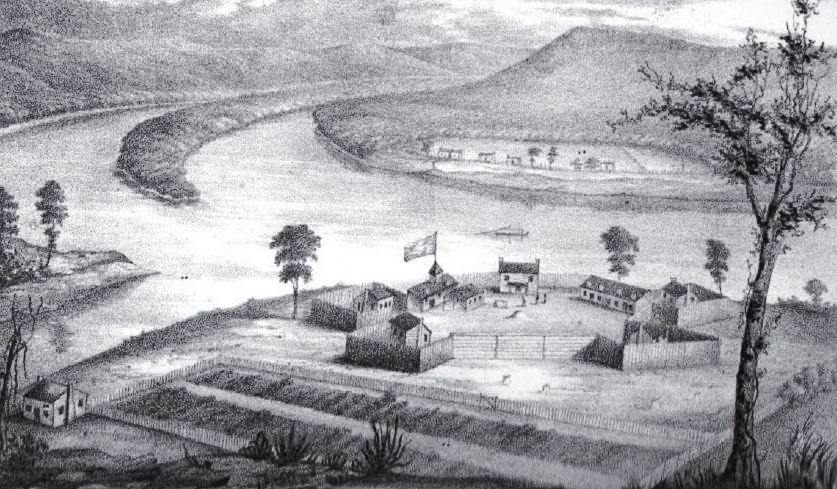
- Fort Harmar near Marietta by Joseph Gilman

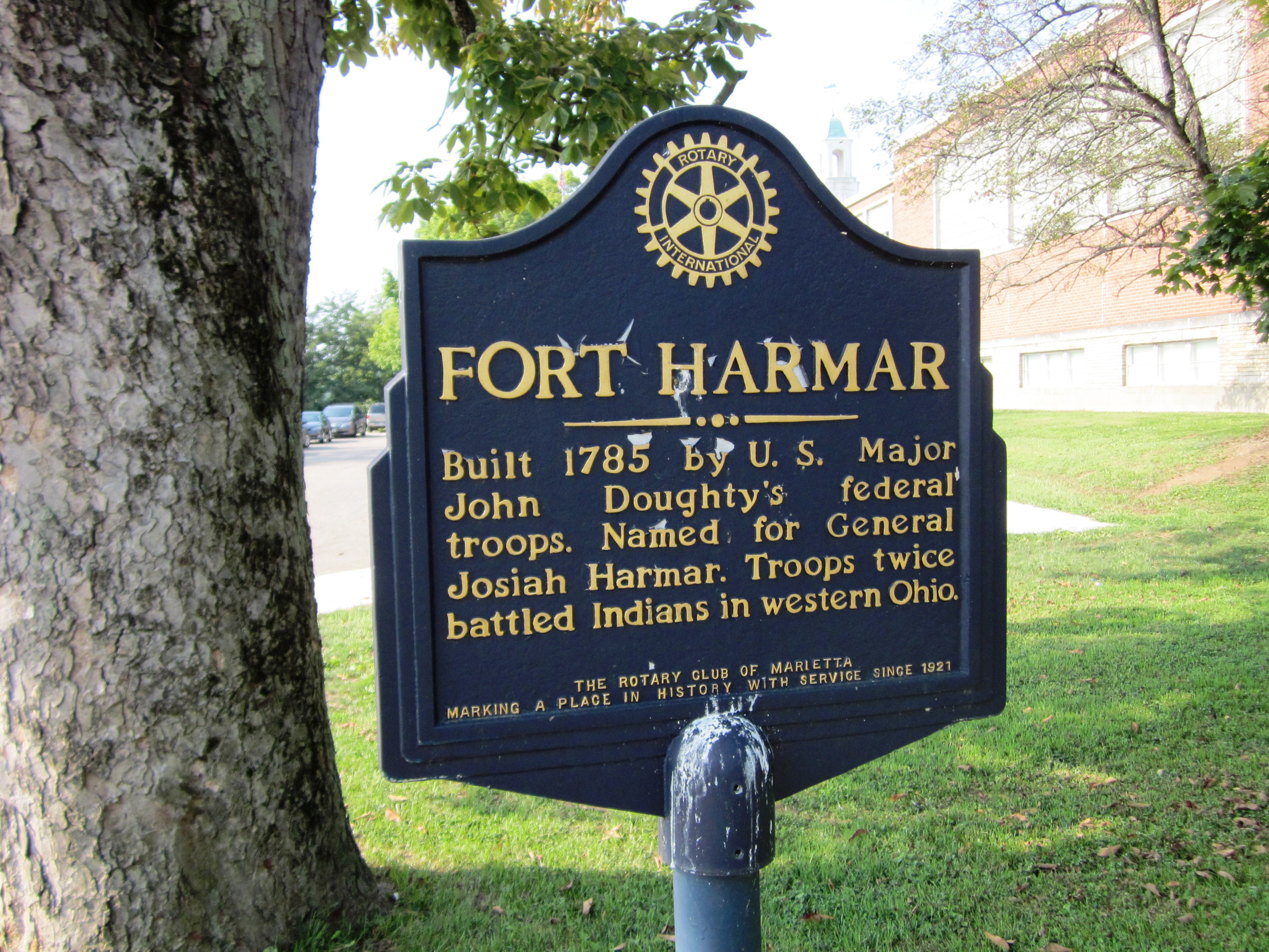
- Fort Harmar plaque at Marietta

Site history
- Built: 1785
- Built by: John Doughty
- Battles/wars: Northwest Indian War
- Events: Treaty of Fort Harmar

Garrison information
- Past commanders: Josiah Harmar, John Doughty, David Ziegler
- Occupants: United States troops
- Fort Harmar
- U.S. Historic district – Contributing property
- Location within Ohio
- Location: across the river from Marietta, Ohio
- Coordinates: 39°24′35.38″N 81°27′27.72″W
- Part of: Harmar Historic District (ID74001645)
- Designated CP: 1974

Fort Harmar was an early United States frontier military fort, built in pentagonal shape during 1785 at the confluence of the Ohio and Muskingum rivers, on the west side of the mouth of the Muskingum River. It was built under the orders of Colonel Josiah Harmar, then commander of the United States Army, and took his name. The fort was intended for the protection of Indians, i.e., to prevent pioneer squatters from settling in the land to the northwest of the Ohio River. "The position was judiciously chosen, as it commanded not only the mouth of the Muskingum, but swept the waters of the Ohio, from a curve in the river for a considerable distance both above and below the fort." It was the first frontier fort built in Ohio Country.

It is notable as the site for the 1789 Treaty of Fort Harmar between the United States and several Native American tribes.

The presence of Fort Harmar was influential in the founding of Marietta, Ohio in 1788 to the east across the Muskingum. During the one-year anniversary celebration of the founding of Marietta, the physician Solomon Drowne said:

But to whom is this settlement more indebted than to the generous chieftain [Josiah Harmar] and other worthy officers of yonder fortress, distinguished by the name of Harmer [Fort Harmar]. With what cheerfulness and cordiality have ye ever entered into every measure promotive of the company's interest. Important is the station ye fill in every respect, and not least in this, that you seem reserved to exhibit to mankind a specimen of that military splendor, which ornamented the arms of America, and would do honor to the troops of any potentate on earth.

The fort was abandoned in 1790 and demolished in summer, 1791, as the area had been redeveloped for other uses, and Marietta expanded to the west side of the river. The exact location of the fort cannot be determined as the Ohio River has been widened by damming, and is believed to be underwater near the mouth of the Muskingum. This area of Marietta is still referred to as Harmar, and the neighborhood has been listed on the National Register of Historic Places as the Harmar Historic District.

== Nearby forts ==
The Campus Martius fortification of the Marietta settlement was built on the east side of the Muskingum and upriver from Fort Harmar during 1788, and fully completed in 1791 at the start of the Northwest Indian War. It was the first settlement of Marietta.

The Picketed Point fortification of Marietta was built in 1791 directly across the Muskingum from Fort Harmar, on the east side of the river's mouth.

== See also ==
- Big Bottom massacre in 1791, 30 miles upstream of Fort Harmar on the Muskingum
- Fort Washington 1789, downriver on the Ohio, which largely superseded it

== Bibliography ==
- Hildreth, S. P.: Pioneer History: Being an Account of the First Examinations of the Ohio Valley, and the Early Settlement of the Northwest Territory, H. W. Derby and Co., Cincinnati, Ohio (1848).
- Zimmer, Louise: More True Stories from Pioneer Valley, published by Sugden Book Store, Marietta, Ohio (1993), chapter 5 entitled David Ziegler.
- Zimmer, Louise: True Stories of Pioneer Times, published by Broughton Foods company, Marietta, Ohio (1987), chapter 2 entitled Fort Harmar.

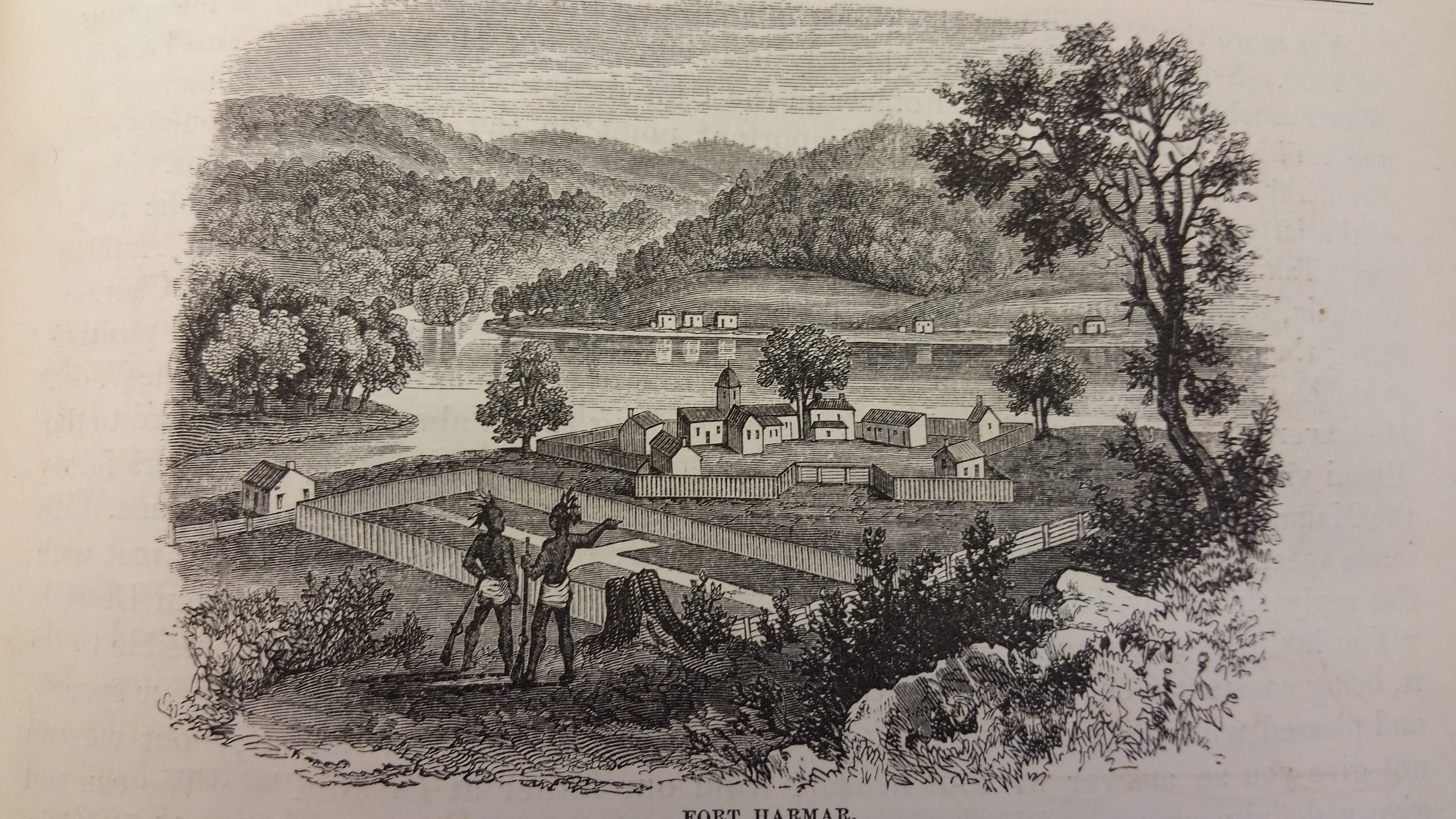
Fort Harmar
