= Beverly, Ohio =

- Village
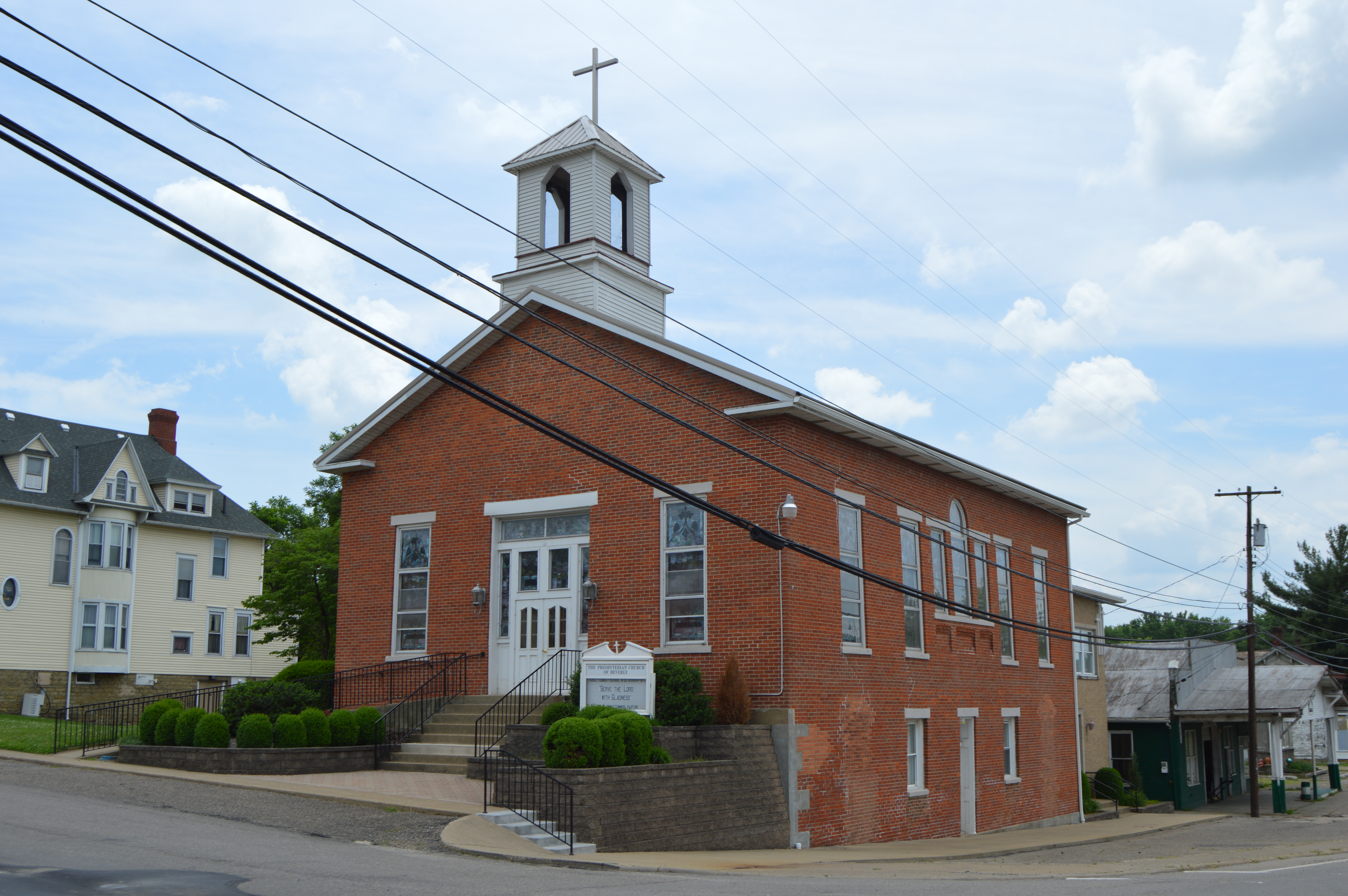
- Beverly Presbyterian Church, Ferry and Fourth Streets

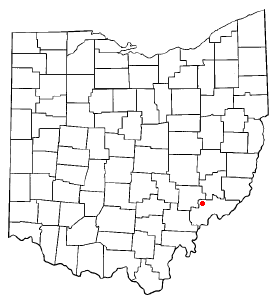
- Location of Beverly, Ohio

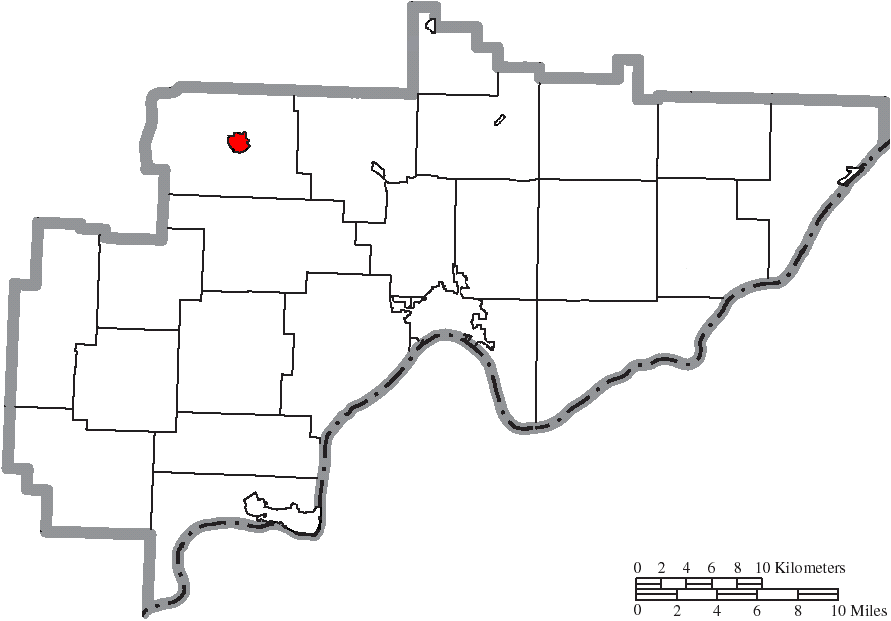
- Location of Beverly in Washington County
- Coordinates: 39°33′00″N 81°38′10″W
- Country: United States
- State: Ohio
- County: Washington

Government
  - Mayor: Jim Ullman

Area
  - Total: 0.79 sq mi (2.05 km^{2})
  - Land: 0.68 sq mi (1.77 km^{2})
  - Water: 0.11 sq mi (0.29 km^{2})
- Elevation: 712 ft (217 m)

Population (2020)
  - Total: 1,233
  - Estimate (2023): 1,209
  - Density: 1,806.9/sq mi (697.64/km^{2})
- Time zone: UTC-5 (Eastern (EST))
  - Summer (DST): UTC-4 (EDT)
- ZIP codes: 45715, 45721
- Area code: 740
- FIPS code: 39-06222
- GNIS feature ID: 2398115
- Website: https://www.beverly-oh.com/

Beverly is a village in Washington County, Ohio, United States. The population was 1,233 at the 2020 census. It is part of the Marietta micropolitan area.

== History ==
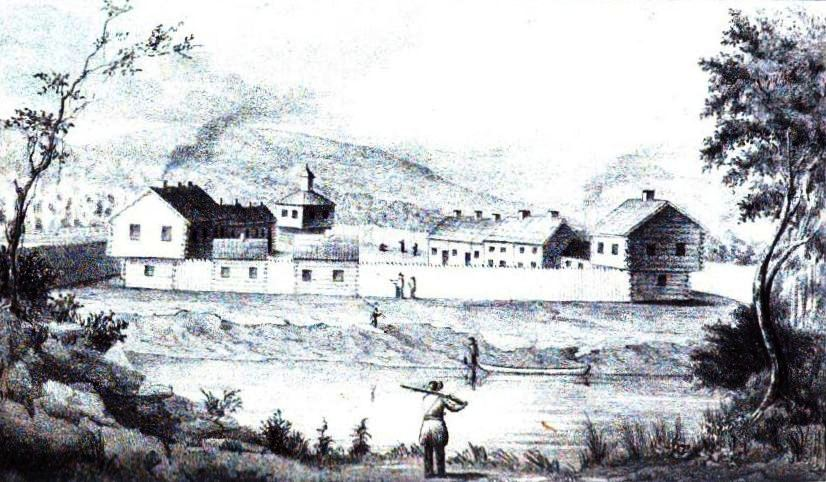
Fort Frye fortification at site of modern-day Beverly, Ohio during the Northwest Indian War

Beverly was established by the Ohio Company in 1789.

A post office called Beverly has been in operation since 1838. The village is named after Beverly, Massachusetts, the native home of a first settler.

== Geography ==
According to the United States Census Bureau, the village has a total area of 0.79 square miles (2.05 km^{2}), of which 0.68 square miles (1.76 km^{2}) is land and 0.11 square miles (0.28 km^{2}) is water.

Beverly is located by the Muskingum River.

State Routes 60, 83, and 339 converge at Beverly.

=== Climate ===
Climate data for Beverly, Ohio, 1991–2020 normals, extremes 1997–present
Month	Jan	Feb	Mar	Apr	May	Jun	Jul	Aug	Sep	Oct	Nov	Dec	Year
Record high °F (°C)	77 (25)	80 (27)	85 (29)	90 (32)	92 (33)	98 (37)	102 (39)	102 (39)	98 (37)	93 (34)	81 (27)	75 (24)	102 (39)
Mean maximum °F (°C)	62.7 (17.1)	64.5 (18.1)	75.8 (24.3)	82.9 (28.3)	88.6 (31.4)	91.7 (33.2)	93.4 (34.1)	92.3 (33.5)	91.1 (32.8)	84.1 (28.9)	73.3 (22.9)	65.1 (18.4)	94.3 (34.6)
Mean daily maximum °F (°C)	38.4 (3.6)	42.4 (5.8)	52.4 (11.3)	65.1 (18.4)	74.2 (23.4)	82.0 (27.8)	85.3 (29.6)	84.1 (28.9)	78.3 (25.7)	66.7 (19.3)	53.9 (12.2)	43.1 (6.2)	63.8 (17.7)
Daily mean °F (°C)	29.6 (−1.3)	32.8 (0.4)	41.2 (5.1)	52.4 (11.3)	62.3 (16.8)	70.9 (21.6)	74.5 (23.6)	73.0 (22.8)	66.3 (19.1)	54.3 (12.4)	43.1 (6.2)	34.5 (1.4)	52.9 (11.6)
Mean daily minimum °F (°C)	20.9 (−6.2)	23.3 (−4.8)	30.0 (−1.1)	39.7 (4.3)	50.4 (10.2)	59.8 (15.4)	63.7 (17.6)	62.0 (16.7)	54.4 (12.4)	41.9 (5.5)	32.3 (0.2)	26.0 (−3.3)	42.0 (5.6)
Mean minimum °F (°C)	0.7 (−17.4)	2.9 (−16.2)	13.3 (−10.4)	25.3 (−3.7)	34.5 (1.4)	47.5 (8.6)	53.1 (11.7)	51.6 (10.9)	42.7 (5.9)	29.7 (−1.3)	18.8 (−7.3)	11.0 (−11.7)	−2.1 (−18.9)
Record low °F (°C)	−16 (−27)	−11 (−24)	−7 (−22)	19 (−7)	28 (−2)	42 (6)	48 (9)	45 (7)	34 (1)	23 (−5)	11 (−12)	−3 (−19)	−16 (−27)
Average precipitation inches (mm)	3.60 (91)	3.08 (78)	4.08 (104)	3.61 (92)	4.44 (113)	4.58 (116)	4.60 (117)	3.60 (91)	3.64 (92)	2.96 (75)	3.03 (77)	3.31 (84)	44.53 (1,130)
Average snowfall inches (cm)	7.1 (18)	4.3 (11)	1.8 (4.6)	0.1 (0.25)	0.0 (0.0)	0.0 (0.0)	0.0 (0.0)	0.0 (0.0)	0.0 (0.0)	0.0 (0.0)	0.2 (0.51)	2.2 (5.6)	15.7 (39.96)
Average extreme snow depth inches (cm)	3.2 (8.1)	3.6 (9.1)	1.9 (4.8)	0.1 (0.25)	0.0 (0.0)	0.0 (0.0)	0.0 (0.0)	0.0 (0.0)	0.0 (0.0)	0.0 (0.0)	0.2 (0.51)	1.8 (4.6)	5.5 (14)
Average precipitation days (≥ 0.01 in)	13.3	11.6	12.0	12.4	14.1	11.7	11.4	10.5	9.0	10.5	9.8	12.1	138.4
Average snowy days (≥ 0.1 in)	3.3	3.0	1.1	0.2	0.0	0.0	0.0	0.0	0.0	0.0	0.2	2.0	9.8
Source 1: NOAA
Source 2: National Weather Service (mean maxima/minima, snow depth 2006–2020)

== Demographics ==
Historical population
Census	Pop.	Note	%±
1860	752		—
1870	814		8.2%
1880	834		2.5%
1890	795		−4.7%
1900	712		−10.4%
1910	720		1.1%
1920	566		−21.4%
1930	600		6.0%
1940	671		11.8%
1950	723		7.7%
1960	1,194		65.1%
1970	1,396		16.9%
1980	1,471		5.4%
1990	1,444		−1.8%
2000	1,282		−11.2%
2010	1,313		2.4%
2020	1,233		−6.1%
2023 (est.)	1,209	▼	−1.9%
U.S. Decennial Census

=== 2010 census ===
As of the census of 2010, there were 1,313 people, 545 households, and 338 families living in the village. The population density was 1,930.9 inhabitants per square mile (745.5/km^{2}). There were 599 housing units at an average density of 880.9 units per square mile (340.1 units/km^{2}). The racial makeup of the village was 97.2% White, 0.3% African American, 0.2% Asian, and 2.4% from two or more races. Hispanic or Latino of any race were 0.5% of the population.

There were 545 households, of which 28.8% had children under the age of 18 living with them, 41.8% were married couples living together, 15.6% had a female householder with no husband present, 4.6% had a male householder with no wife present, and 38.0% were non-families. 33.8% of all households were made up of individuals, and 15.9% had someone living alone who was 65 years of age or older. The average household size was 2.32 and the average family size was 2.94.

The median age in the village was 41.2 years. 23.7% of residents were under the age of 18; 8% were between the ages of 18 and 24; 22.9% were from 25 to 44; 25.5% were from 45 to 64; and 19.9% were 65 years of age or older. The gender makeup of the village was 46.2% male and 53.8% female.

=== 2000 census ===
As of the census of 2000, there were 1,282 people, 556 households, and 351 families living in the village. The population density was 1,757.6 inhabitants per square mile (678.6/km^{2}). There were 604 housing units at an average density of 828.1 units per square mile (319.7 units/km^{2}). The racial makeup of the village was 99.38% White, 0.31% African American, 0.08% Native American, 0.08% Asian, 0.00% Pacific Islander, 0.00% from other races, and 0.16% from two or more races. 0.23% of the population were Hispanic or Latino of any race.

There were 556 households, out of which 26.3% had children under the age of 18 living with them, 53.6% were married couples living together, 7.7% had a female householder with no husband present, and 36.7% were non-families. 32.7% of all households were made up of individuals, and 15.5% had someone living alone who was 65 years of age or older. The average household size was 2.23 and the average family size was 2.81.

In the village, the population was spread out, with 21.6% under the age of 18, 7.4% from 18 to 24, 24.9% from 25 to 44, 23.5% from 45 to 64, and 22.6% who were 65 years of age or older. The median age was 43 years. For every 100 females there were 87.2 males. For every 100 females age 18 and over, there were 84.1 males.

The median income for a household in the village was $32,798, and the median income for a family was $39,853. Males had a median income of $35,556 versus $19,196 for females. The per capita income for the village was $20,597. 9.8% of the population and 8.4% of families were below the poverty line. 10.9% of those under the age of 18 and 10.1% of those 65 and older were living below the poverty line.

== Education ==
Beverly is home to the Fort Frye School District. Its high school and junior high school are located in the village, plus an elementary school; two other elementary schools are located in Lowell and Lower Salem.

Beverly has a public library, a branch of the Washington County Public Library.

== Notable person ==
- John Sherman, American political leader, briefly worked and lived in Beverly.

== See also ==
- Waterford, sister city across the river.
