= Anselm Tupper =

Continental Army officer, pioneer to the Ohio Country

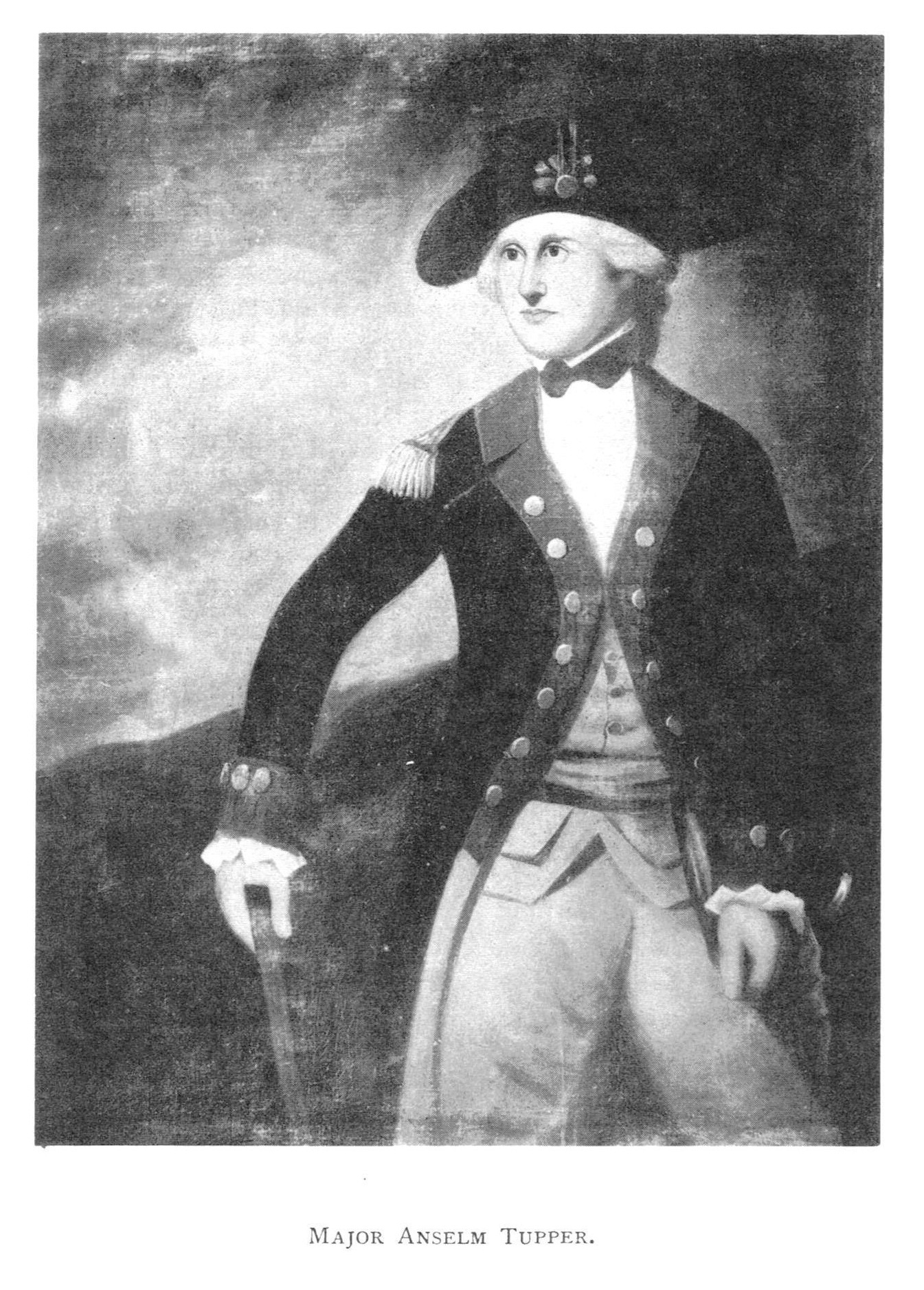
- Anselm Tupper, portrait attributed to "Sully"
- Born: October 11, 1763; Easton, Massachusetts
- Died: December 25, 1808 (aged 45); Marietta, Ohio
- Burial place: Mound Cemetery (Marietta, Ohio)
- Relatives: Benjamin Tupper (father)
- Military career
- Allegiance: United States of America
- Branch: Continental Army
- Rank: Lieutenant and Adjutant
- Conflicts: American Revolutionary War
- Other work: pioneer, surveyor, militia major during the Northwest Indian War, school teacher, poet

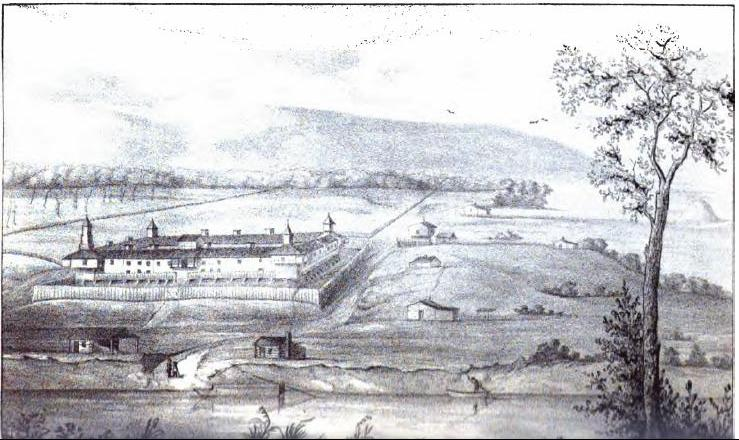
The Campus Martius at Marietta

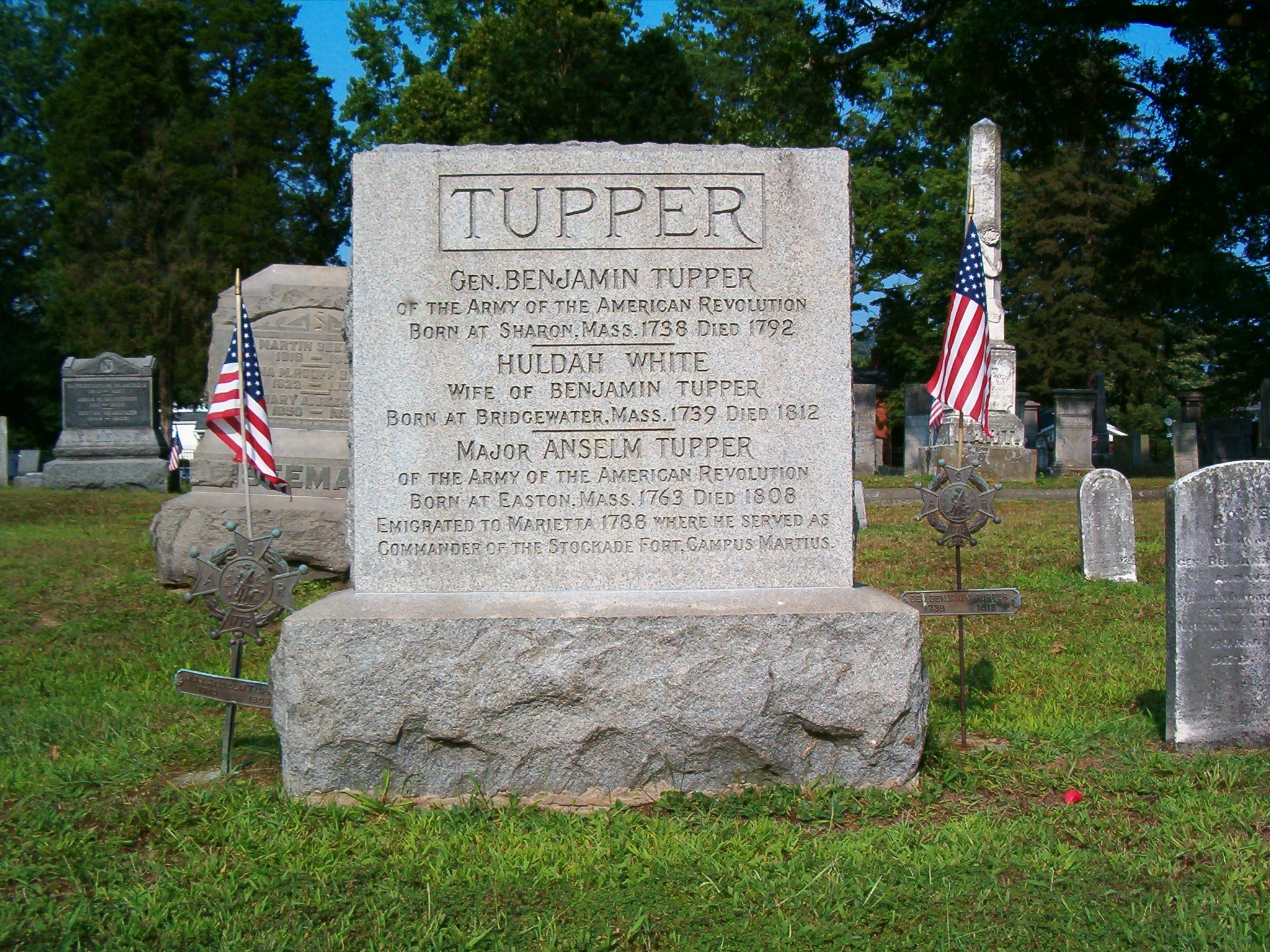
Marker at Mound Cemetery for Anselm Tupper and his parents, Benjamin and Huldah Tupper

Anselm Tupper (October 11, 1763 – December 25, 1808) was an officer of the Continental Army during the American Revolutionary War, a pioneer to the Ohio Country, and one of the founders of Marietta, Ohio, the first permanent American settlement in the Northwest Territory. The eldest son of Benjamin Tupper, Anselm enlisted in the fight for independence during 1775, while only eleven years old, achieving the rank of lieutenant before his seventeenth birthday. After the war, he was a pioneer and surveyor in the Northwest Territory, and became major of the militia at Marietta during the Northwest Indian War. Tupper was the first school teacher at Marietta, and was a classical scholar and poet. He was unmarried, and was known as a favorite in society.

== Early life and the American Revolutionary War ==
Anselm Tupper was born in Easton, Massachusetts on October 11, 1763, and grew up to the age of eleven in Chesterfield in western Massachusetts. His childhood was brief, as he enlisted in May 1775 at the young age of eleven, shortly after the Battles of Lexington and Concord, likely being one of the younger soldiers in the fight for independence. Anselm joined Captain Robert West's Chesterfield company, assigned to Colonel John Fellows' regiment (17th Massachusetts Bay Provincial Regiment), in which Anselm's father, Benjamin Tupper, was already major. As described in Chaffin's History of the Town of Easton, Massachusetts,

It is interesting to think of this Revolutionary soldier, not yet twelve years old, engaging in all the toil, hardship, and peril of war, and never flinching until his country's independence was achieved.

In 1779, Tupper was appointed adjutant of Colonel Ebenezer Sproat's (aka Sprout) regiment. He was appointed ensign during 1779 or 1780. He was subsequently promoted to the rank of lieutenant and adjutant in the 11th Massachusetts Regiment on September 1, 1780, before his seventeenth birthday. He then served in the 10th Massachusetts Regiment during 1781 and 1782, the 6th Massachusetts Regiment during the first half of 1783, and the 2nd Massachusetts Regiment from June until November 3, 1783.

== Post-war and the Ohio Country ==
In 1786, Rufus Putnam and Benjamin Tupper founded the Ohio Company of Associates. During that year, Anselm joined his father in a survey of the Seven Ranges in the Ohio Country. Anslem became a shareholder of the Ohio Company of Associates, and was engaged as a surveyor with the company. Subsequently, on April 7, 1788, Anselm Tupper and a group of American pioneers to the Northwest Territory, led by Rufus Putnam, arrived at the confluence of the Ohio and Muskingum rivers to establish Marietta, Ohio as the first permanent American settlement in the Northwest Territory. Anselm's parents, Benjamin and Huldah, arrived several months later.

Anselm Tupper was a notable member of the pioneer settlement of Marietta, and a favorite in society. In September 1788, he served as a juror on the Grand Jury of the first civil court in the Northwest Territory. During the Northwest Indian War in 1789, he was appointed major in the militia with command of the Campus Martius fortification during the war. He was a founding member of the Society of the Cincinnati, and an original member of the American Union Lodge No. 1 of Freemasons at Marietta along with others including Rufus Putnam, Benjamin Tupper, and William Stacy. Anselm Tupper was the second officer of the vessel Orlando, built at Marietta in 1803; he sailed with the Orlando from Marietta down the Ohio and Mississippi rivers, across the Atlantic, and through the Mediterranean and Adriatic seas to Trieste. He then returned home to Marietta. He was the first school teacher in Marietta and the Northwest Territory, was a classical scholar, and was also a poet.

Anselm Tupper died on December 25, 1808. He is buried with his father and many other American Revolutionary War soldiers and pioneers at Mound Cemetery in Marietta.

== Sources ==
- Andrews, Martin R.: History of Marietta and Washington County, Ohio and Representative Citizens, Biographical Publishing Company, Chicago, Illinois (1902).
- Barker, Joseph: Recollections of the First Settlement of Ohio, Marietta College, Marietta, Ohio (1958); original manuscript written late in Joseph Barker's life, prior to his death in 1843.
- Birthplace of the Northwest Territory, Northwest Territory Celebration Commission, Marietta, Ohio (1938).
- Chaffin, William L.: History of the Town of Easton, Massachusetts, John Wilson and Son, University Press, Cambridge, Massachusetts (1886).
- Cutler, Julia Perkins: The Founders of Ohio, Brief Sketches of the Forty-Eight Pioneers, Robert Clarke and Co., Cincinnati, Ohio (1888).
- Drake, Francis S.: Memorials of the Society of Cincinnati of Massachusetts, Boston (1873).
- Hawley, Owen: Mound Cemetery, Marietta, Ohio, Washington County Historical Society, Marietta, Ohio (1996).
- Heitman, Francis B.: Officers of the Continental Army during the War of the Revolution, Rare Book Shop Publishing Co., Washington, D.C. (1914).
- Hildreth, S. P.: Pioneer History: Being an Account of the First Examinations of the Ohio Valley, and the Early Settlement of the Northwest Territory, H. W. Derby and Co., Cincinnati, Ohio (1848).
- Howe, Henry (1891). Historical Collections of Ohio. Vol. III. Columbus, Ohio: Henry Howe and Son.
- Hulbert, Archer Butler: The Records of the Original Proceedings of the Ohio Company, Volume I, Marietta Historical Commission, Marietta, Ohio (1917).
- Hulbert, Archer Butler: The Records of the Original Proceedings of the Ohio Company, Volume II, Marietta Historical Commission, Marietta, Ohio (1917).
- Massachusetts Soldiers and Sailors in the War of the Revolution, Vol 16, Published by the Secretary of the Commonwealth, Wright and Potter Printing Co., Boston (1907).
- Smith, B. A. and Vining, J. W.: American Geographers, 1784-1812, Praeger Publishers, Westport, Connecticut (2003).
- Summers, Thomas J.: History of Marietta, The Leader Publishing Co., Marietta, Ohio (1903).
- Venable, W. H.: Beginnings of Literary Culture in the Ohio Valley, Robert Clark and Co., Cincinnati, Ohio (1891).
