= Griffin Greene =

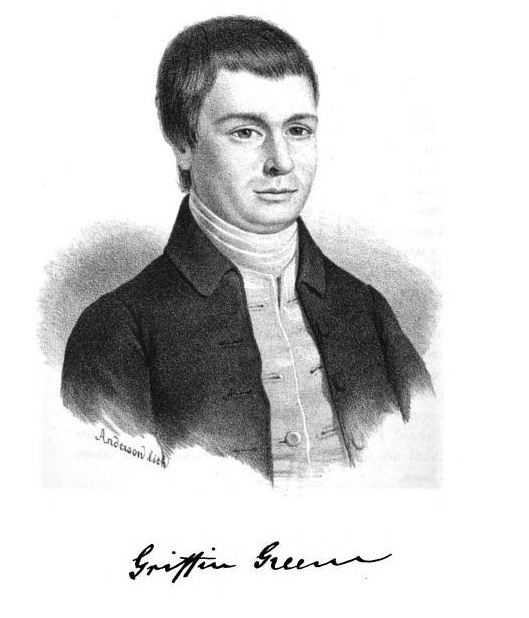
- Born: February 20, 1749; Warwick, Rhode Island
- Died: June 1804 (aged 55); Marietta, Ohio
- Burial place: Mound Cemetery (Marietta, Ohio)
- Relatives: Nathanael Greene (cousin), Christopher Greene (brother-in-law)
- Military career
- Allegiance: United States of America
- Branch: Continental Army
- Rank: deputy to the Quartermaster General
- Conflicts: American Revolutionary War
- Other work: director of the Ohio Company of Associates

Griffin Greene (1749–1804) served as a commissary, paymaster, and quartermaster to the Continental Army during the American Revolutionary War. He was subsequently a pioneer to the Ohio Country, helping establish Marietta, Ohio as the first permanent American settlement of the new United States in the Northwest Territory.

== Early life ==
Griffin Greene was born in Warwick, Rhode Island on February 20, 1749. He married Sarah Greene of the same town, sister of Christopher Greene. They had four children, Richard, Philip, Griffin, and Susan.

With his cousin Jacob Greene, Griffin built a forge on the Pawtuxet River for the manufacture of iron. This forge was subsequently used for the manufacture of cannonballs supplied to revolutionary soldiers.

Griffin and his cousin, Gen. Nathanael Greene, had a close relationship. “Among the earliest attachments of the general’s life, was one formed with a cousin of the name of Griffin Greene. And to the close of their lives, the affectionate regard in which they held each other, was nearly proverbial.” They engaged in a significant volume of correspondence during the war, much of which was preserved or recorded.

== Revolutionary War ==
During 1775 Griffin Greene served as commissary to Rhode Island troops. In 1777 he served as paymaster of the 1st Rhode Island Regiment of the Continental Army; this regiment was then commanded by his brother-in-law, Colonel Christopher Greene. During 1778, Griffin Greene served as deputy to the Quartermaster General of the Continental Army, his cousin Major General Nathanael Greene.

== Marietta and the Ohio Country ==
After the war, Griffin Greene was a pioneer to the Ohio Country. He was a prominent figure in the early days of Marietta and the Northwest Territory, serving in multiple positions of government, including justice of the peace, judge, postmaster, revenue collector, and port inspector. He became a director of the Ohio Company of Associates upon the death of James Mitchell Varnum. He also spent time at the settlement of Belpre, Ohio and took an active part in the erection of the Farmer's Castle fortification during the Northwest Indian War. At the start of his trip west, Meriwether Lewis spent September 13, 1803 at Marietta and visited with Griffin. Griffin Greene was "a man of intelligent aspect, quick apprehension, and a ready, vigorous application of his mind to any subject before him." "As a man of genius and intellect, he ranked with the first of the Ohio Company's settlers, abounding as it did with able men." He died in Marietta, Ohio during June 1804 and was buried at Mound Cemetery in Marietta, along with many other American Revolutionary War soldiers and pioneers.

== Bibliography ==
- Ambrose, S. E.: Undaunted Courage, Simon and Schuster, New York, New York (1996).
- Hildreth, S. P.: Biographical and Historical Memoirs of the Early Pioneer Settlers of Ohio, H. W. Derby and Co., Cincinnati, Ohio (1852).
- Hildreth, S. P.: Pioneer History: Being an Account of the First Examinations of the Ohio Valley, and the Early Settlement of the Northwest Territory, H. W. Derby and Co., Cincinnati, Ohio (1848).
- Johnson, W.: Sketches of the Life and Correspondence of Nathanael Greene, Vol. I, A. E. Miller, Charleston, South Carolina (1822).
- Lowrie, W: Journal of the Executive Proceedings of the Senate of the United States of America, Vol. I, Duff Green, Washington, D.C. (1828).
- Milligan, F. J.: Ohio's Founding Fathers, iUniverse, New York, New York (2003).
