= Ebenezer Sproat =

Continental Army officer, pioneer to the Ohio Country

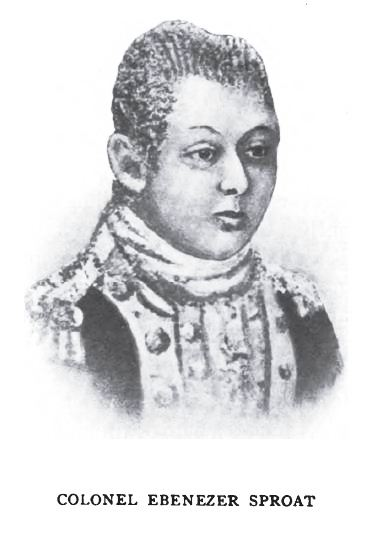
- Ebenezer Sproat (aka Sprout)
- Born: February 9, 1752; Middleborough, Massachusetts, British America
- Died: January 7, 1805 (aged 52); Marietta, Ohio, U.S.
- Burial place: Mound Cemetery (Marietta, Ohio)
- Relatives: Abraham Whipple (father-in-law)
- Military career
- Allegiance: United States of America
- Branch: Continental Army
- Rank: Colonel
- Conflicts: American Revolutionary War
- Other work: pioneer to the Ohio Country, surveyor, militia officer during the Northwest Indian War, first sheriff in the Northwest Territory

Ebenezer Sproat (February 9, 1752 – January 7, 1805), surname also spelled Sprout, was an officer of the Continental Army during the American Revolutionary War, a pioneer to the Ohio Country, and one of the founders of Marietta, Ohio, the first permanent American settlement in the Northwest Territory. He served throughout the entire American war of independence, from April 1775 through November 1783, achieving the rank of colonel. After the war, he was a pioneer and surveyor in the Northwest Territory, and became a leader of the militia at Marietta during the Northwest Indian War. He was the first sheriff in the Northwest Territory and Ohio, serving fourteen years as sheriff of Washington County, the oldest county in Ohio.

== Early life ==
Ebenezer Sproat was born in Middleborough, Province of Massachusetts Bay in 1752. He was the son of Bathsheba (Wood) and Ebenezer Sproat, who owned a farm and was the proprietor of the Sproat Tavern in Middleborough. During his boyhood and youth, he assisted his father in cultivating the farm. When quite young he became interested in the public affairs of the colony. Like his father Ebenezer grew to be a tall man and was of perfect proportions.

== Revolutionary War ==
Ebenezer Sproat was in the field with the Continental Army throughout the American Revolutionary War, and was engaged in the battles of Trenton, Princeton, and Monmouth. He was a disciplinarian, but also of cheerful disposition, and was a favorite with both officers and enlisted ranks.

He initially served with Colonel Theophilus Cotton's Massachusetts Regiment during 1775. He joined as captain in April 1775, several days after the Battles of Lexington and Concord, and was promoted to major in June 1775. During 1776 he served with Colonel Ebenezer Learned's 3rd Continental Regiment. He was subsequently promoted to lieutenant colonel of Colonel William Shepard's 4th Massachusetts Regiment and served with this regiment from January 1777 to September 1778. While with this regiment, he was one of the officers who wintered at Valley Forge with General George Washington during the winter and spring of 1777 and 1778. He was said to be the tallest man in his regiment. Ebenezer subsequently transferred to the 12th Massachusetts Regiment, where he served until from September 1778 through year-end 1780.

Ebenezer Sproat next joined the 2nd Massachusetts Regiment where he served from January 1781 until November 1783. During January 1781, he was executive officer under General Robert Howe with a detachment of five hundred men, ordered out to suppress a mutiny of the 2nd New Jersey Regiment at Pompton, New Jersey. Three of the ringleaders of the mutiny were tried on the spot, with Lieutenant Colonel Sproat being president of the court-martial. This was a sorrowful duty for Colonel Sproat; two of the men were sentenced and executed. He often said that duty was the most painful ever imposed upon him. Ebenezer Sproat was promoted to colonel during September 1783, shortly before the end of his eight and one-half years of service in the Continental Army.

An anecdote illustrating Colonel Sproat's good nature with the enlisted ranks concerns a furlough early in the war when he was home visiting his mother. Three private soldiers asked for lunch at his parents' tavern, and when finished eating, asked him the cost. He informed them that the cost was about a shilling for each man. To their surprise, instead of collecting the money from them, he paid each man a shilling and wished them a good journey. Colonel Sproat was also on good terms with the officers such as General Von Steuben, and was a friend of General Washington.

== Post-war in Rhode Island ==
After the war, Ebenezer Sproat lived in Providence, Rhode Island, where he married Catherine Whipple, daughter of Commodore Abraham Whipple of the Continental Navy. He purchased a store, and worked as a merchant, but was not successful. In 1786 he was appointed as surveyor for the state of Rhode Island. In that role, he participated in the surveying of the Seven Ranges in the Ohio Country.

== The Ohio Country ==
Ebenezer Sproat became a shareholder of the Ohio Company of Associates, and was engaged as a surveyor with the company. On April 7, 1788, Ebenezer Sproat and a group of American pioneers to the Northwest Territory, led by Rufus Putnam, arrived at the confluence of the Ohio and Muskingum rivers to establish Marietta, Ohio as the first permanent American settlement in the Northwest Territory. Ebenezer's wife, daughter, and Commodore Whipple joined him at Marietta the following year.

Colonel Sproat, with his tall and commanding presence, was a notable member of the pioneer settlement of Marietta. He greatly impressed the local Indians, who in admiration dubbed him "Hetuck", meaning "eye of the buck dear", or "Big Buckeye". Some historians believe this is how Ohio came to be known as the Buckeye State, though a more commonly accepted explanation involves the later presidential campaign of William Henry Harrison.

During the Northwest Indian War he was authorized by Secretary of War Henry Knox to superintend the military affairs of the United States in Washington County. He was a founding member of the Society of the Cincinnati, and helped form the American Union Lodge No. 1 of Freemasons at Marietta along with others including Rufus Putnam, Benjamin Tupper, and William Stacy. Ebenezer Sproat was the first sheriff in the Northwest Territory, serving fourteen years from 1788 to 1802 as sheriff of Washington County, the oldest county in Ohio. At that time, the county encompassed lands from the Ohio River in the south, to Lake Erie in the north, embracing half of the eventual state of Ohio. Sheriff Sproat was cheerful and fond of company, and quite attached to horses and dogs. As sheriff, he always rode a horse during his long journeys through the county, accompanied by two or three large dogs. He filled the office of sheriff with dignity, and exhibited a great kindness in his execution of the law. He was often known to furnish a poor family with his own money for repayment of a debt, rather than to make an arrest.

== Later life ==
In his latter years he was fond of physical labor and of cultivating the land. Ebenezer Sproat died in Marietta in early 1805, either on January 7, or perhaps during February, with his oft-repeated wish of a sudden exit fully answered. He is buried adjacent to his father-in-law, Commodore Whipple, and near many other American Revolutionary War soldiers and pioneers at Mound Cemetery in Marietta.
