= Mound Cemetery (Marietta, Ohio) =

Historic site in Washington County, Ohio

- Mound Cemetery Mound
- U.S. National Register of Historic Places
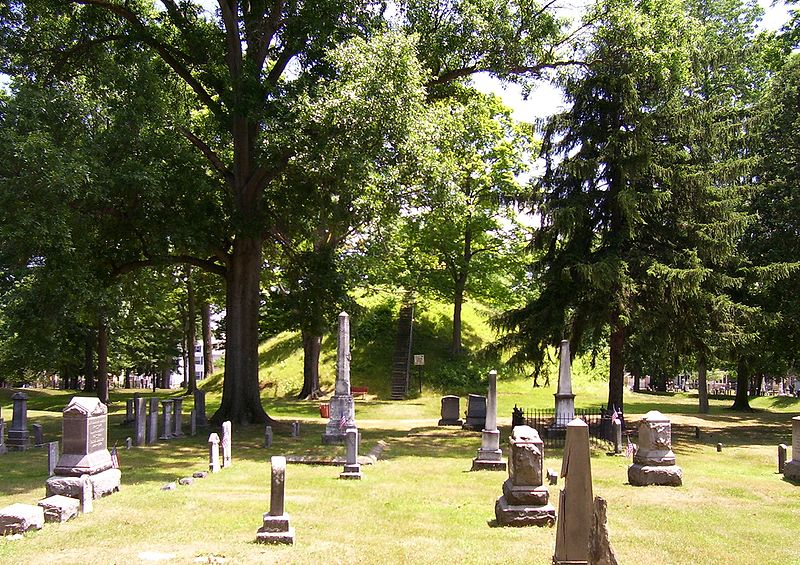
- Mound Cemetery with Great Mound in background

- Location within Ohio Location within the United States
- Location: 5th and Scammel Sts., Marietta, Ohio
- Coordinates: 39°25′12″N 81°27′07″W
- NRHP reference No.: 73001549
- Added to NRHP: February 23, 1973

Mound Cemetery in Marietta, Ohio, is a historic cemetery developed around the base of a prehistoric Adena burial mound known as the Great Mound or Conus. The city founders preserved the Great Mound from destruction by establishing the city cemetery around it in 1801.

The city of Marietta was developed in 1788 by pioneers from Massachusetts, soon after the American Revolutionary War and organization of the Northwest Territory. Many of the founders were officers of the Revolutionary War who had received federal land grants for military services. Among high-ranking officers buried at the cemetery are generals Rufus Putnam and Benjamin Tupper, who were founders of the Ohio Company of Associates; as well as Commodore Abraham Whipple and Colonel William Stacy. The cemetery has the highest number of burials of American Revolutionary War officers in the country.

== Great Mound or Conus ==
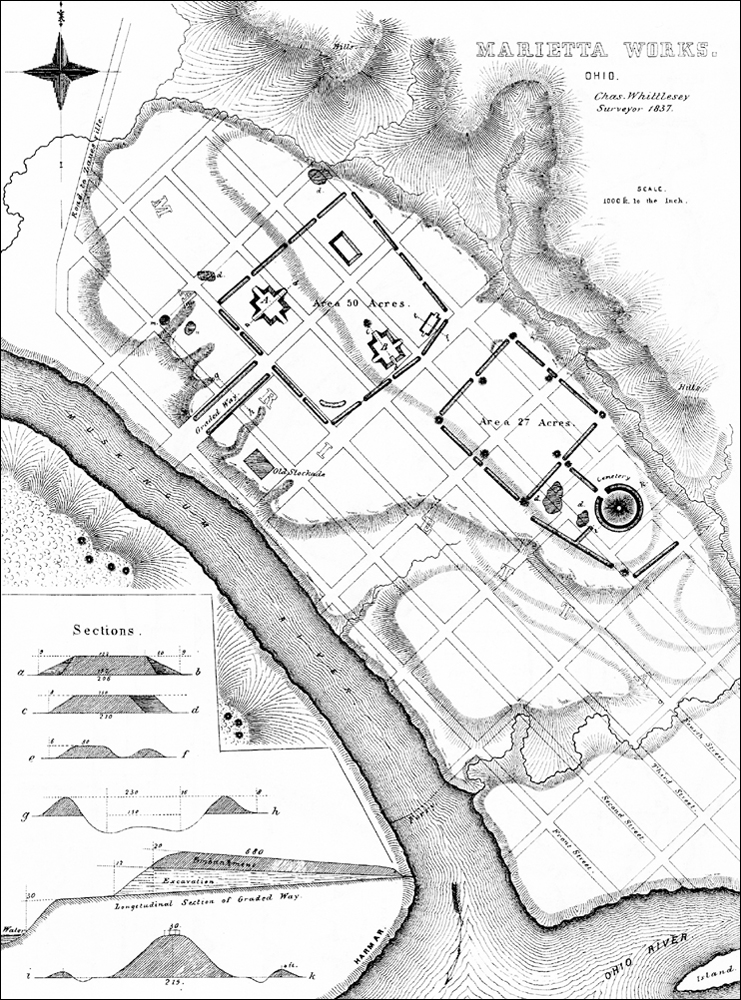
Survey of Marietta Earthworks, 1838

The conical Great Mound at Mound Cemetery is part of an Ohio Hopewell culture mound complex known as the Marietta Earthworks. Archaeologists estimate that it was built between 100 BC and 500 AD. Early European American settlers gave the structures Latin names. The complex includes the Sacra Via (meaning "sacred way"), three walled enclosures, the Quadranaou, Capitolium (meaning "capital") and at least two other additional platform mounds, and the Conus burial mound and its accompanying ditch and embankment. The complex was surveyed and drawn in 1838 by Samuel R. Curtis (at the time a civil engineer for the state of Ohio). This survey was incorrectly attributed to Charles Whittlesey by E. G. Squier and E.H. Davis in their Ancient Monuments of the Mississippi Valley, published by the Smithsonian Institution in 1848. At the time the complex "included a large square enclosure surrounding four flat-topped pyramidal mounds, another smaller square, and a circular enclosure with a large burial mound at its center."

The Conus mound was listed on the National Register of Historic Places on February 23, 1973 as the Mound Cemetery Mound, site listing number 73001549. In 1990 archaeologists from the Cleveland Museum of Natural History excavated a section of the Capitolium mound and determined that the mound was definitely constructed by peoples of the Hopewell Culture.

== American Revolutionary War soldiers ==
The city of Marietta was developed in 1788 by migrant pioneers from Massachusetts, soon after the American Revolutionary War and organization of the Northwest Territory. The cemetery has the highest number of burials of American Revolutionary War officers in the country. The original pioneers, city founders from the Ohio Company of Associates, preserved the Great Mound from destruction by establishing the city cemetery around it.

Many of the founders were officers of the Revolutionary War who had received federal land grants for military services. Among high-ranking officers buried at the cemetery are generals Rufus Putnam and Benjamin Tupper, who were founders of the Ohio Company of Associates; as well as Commodore Abraham Whipple and Colonel William Stacy.

It was stated at the Conference that "more officers of the Revolution are buried in the Old Mound Cemetery, Marietta, than at any other place in the United States."

— DAR, American Monthly, Vol. 16 (Jan–Jun 1900), 329.

In 1825, General Lafayette of France, who fought with the Americans during the Revolution, visited Marietta. He said of the city's veterans: "I knew them well. I saw them fighting the battles of their country ... They were the bravest of the brave. Better men never lived."

The Washington County Historical Society compiled the a list of Revolutionary soldiers buried in Mound Cemetery, notable persons in that list shown below:

- Col. Robert Taylor, first burial in the cemetery
- Gen. Rufus Putnam
- Griffin Greene, Sr., Quartermaster
- Commodore Abraham Whipple
- Col. Ebenezer Sproat
- Col. William Stacy, Sr.
- Gen. Benjamin Tupper
- Maj. Anselm Tupper
- Capt. Nathaniel Saltonstall
- Samuel Hildreth, Sr. (father of Samuel Prescott Hildreth, also buried here)

The books of Samuel Prescott Hildreth (1783–1863), buried here, provide insight into the early history of Marietta and the Northwest Territory, and the lives of the soldiers and early pioneer settlers.

Major General James Mitchell Varnum (1748–1789) was originally buried in the Mound Cemetery. His remains were later moved to Oak Grove Cemetery in Marietta.

== Gallery ==
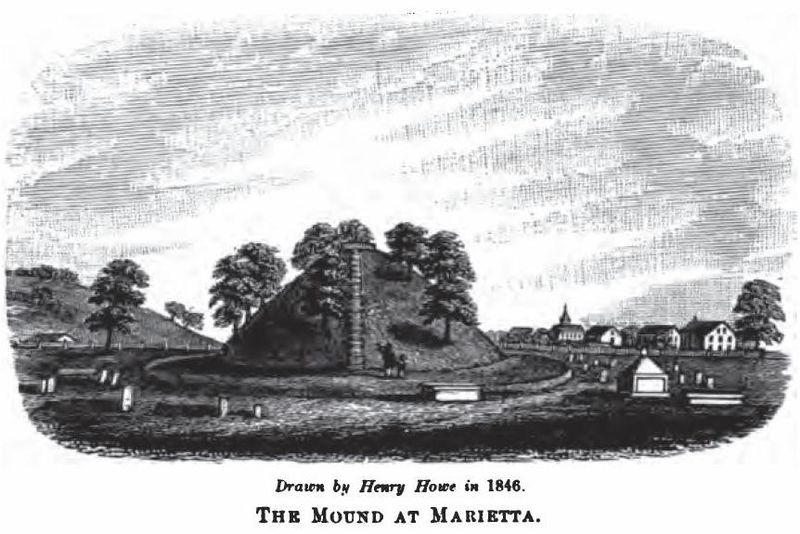
Drawing of Mound Cemetery, 1846

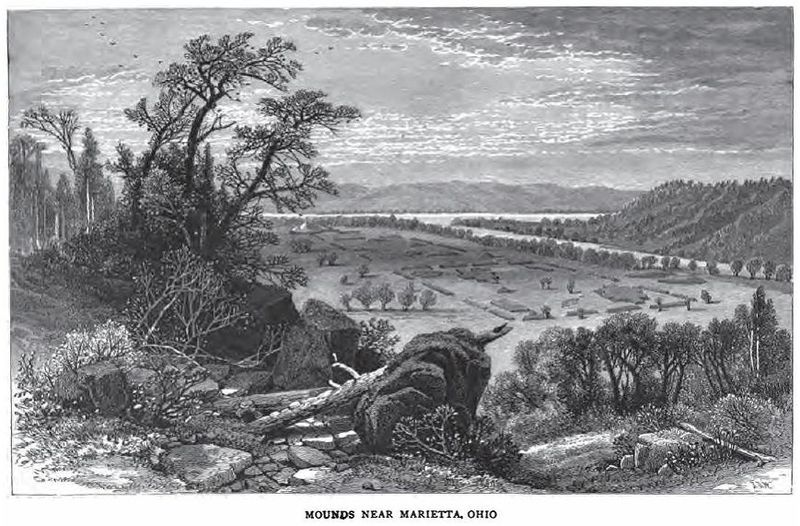
Drawing of Marietta Earthworks

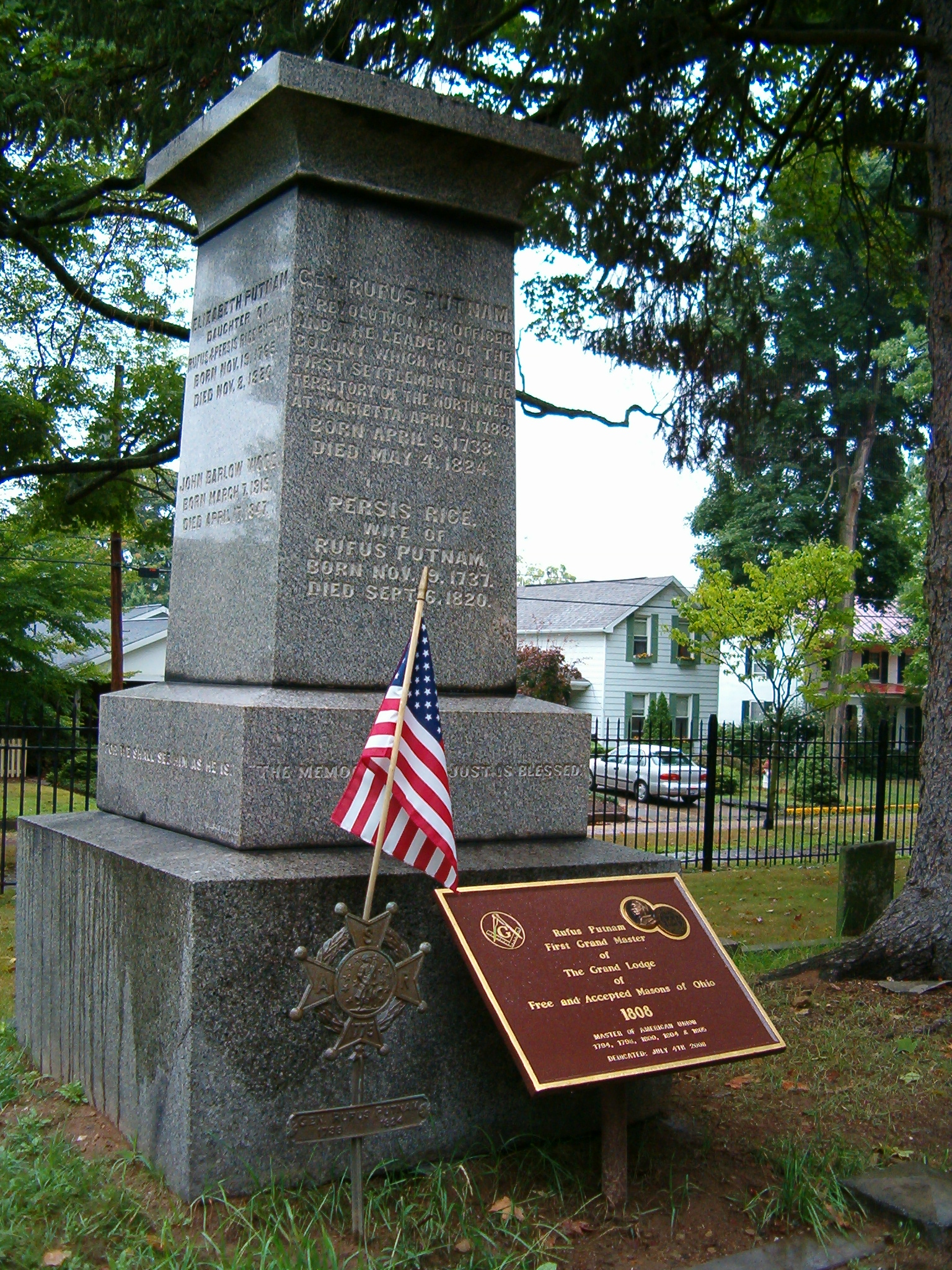
Rufus Putnam marker

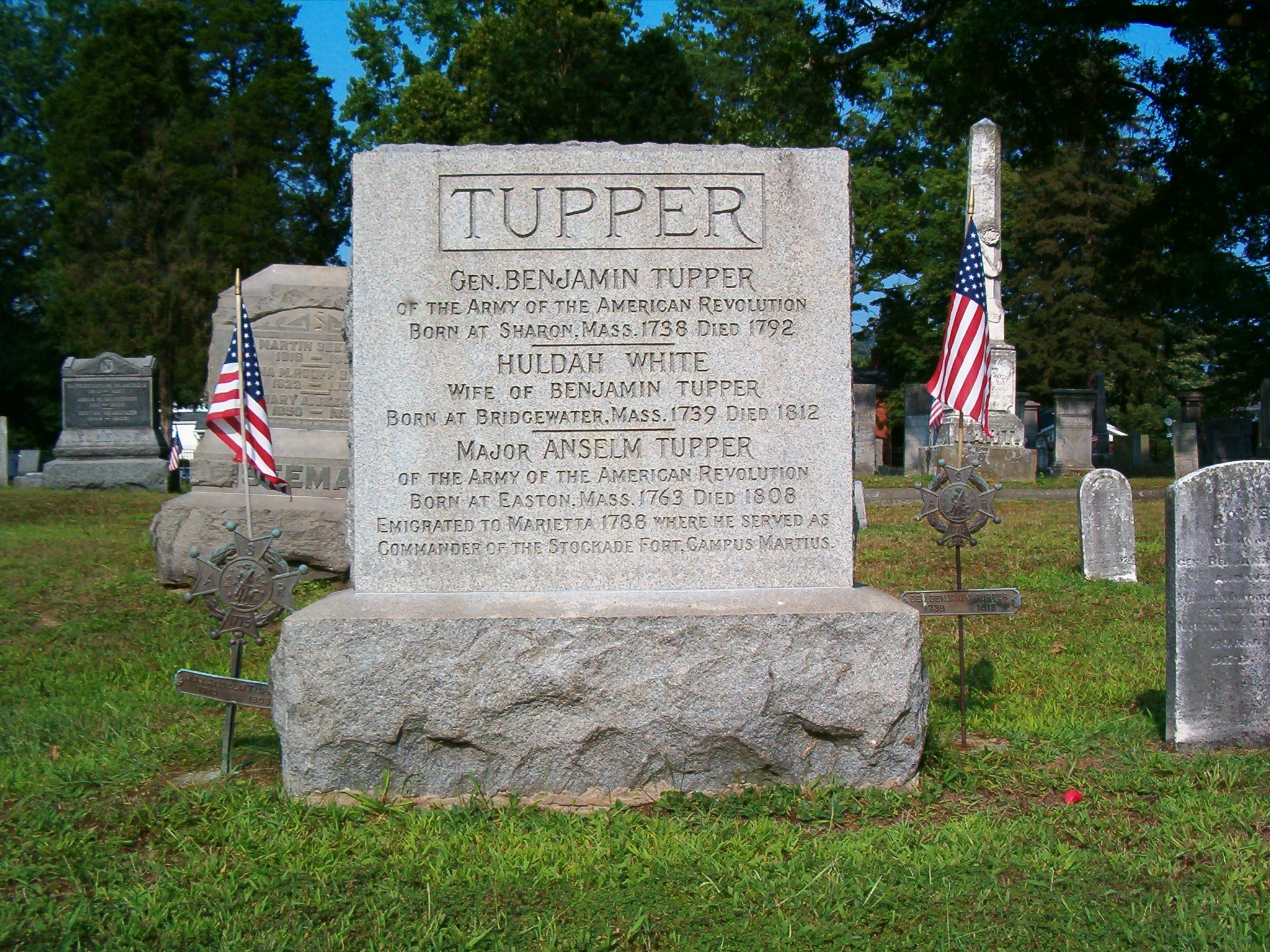
Benjamin Tupper and Anselm Tupper marker

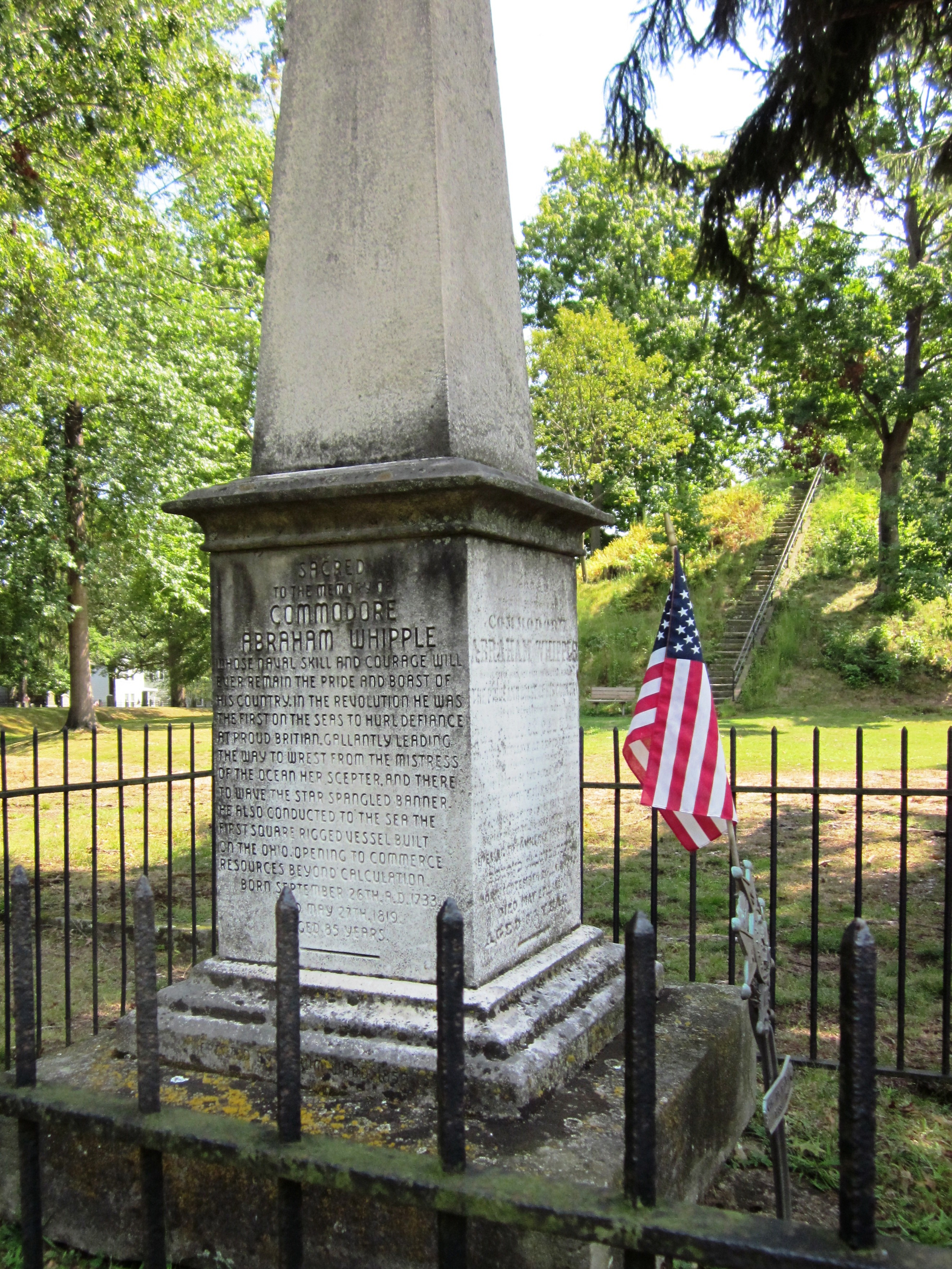
Abraham Whipple marker

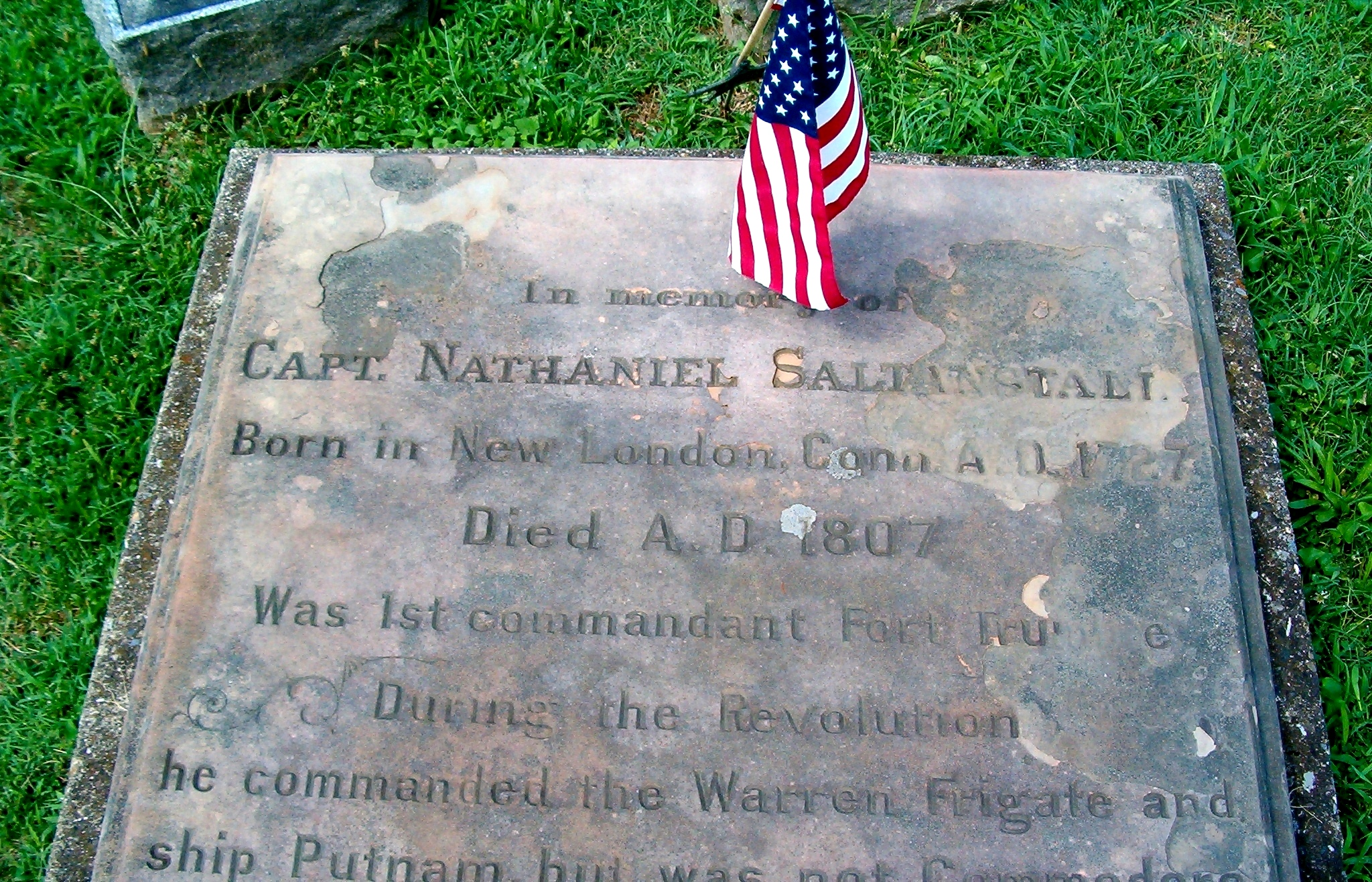
Nath. Saltonstall marker

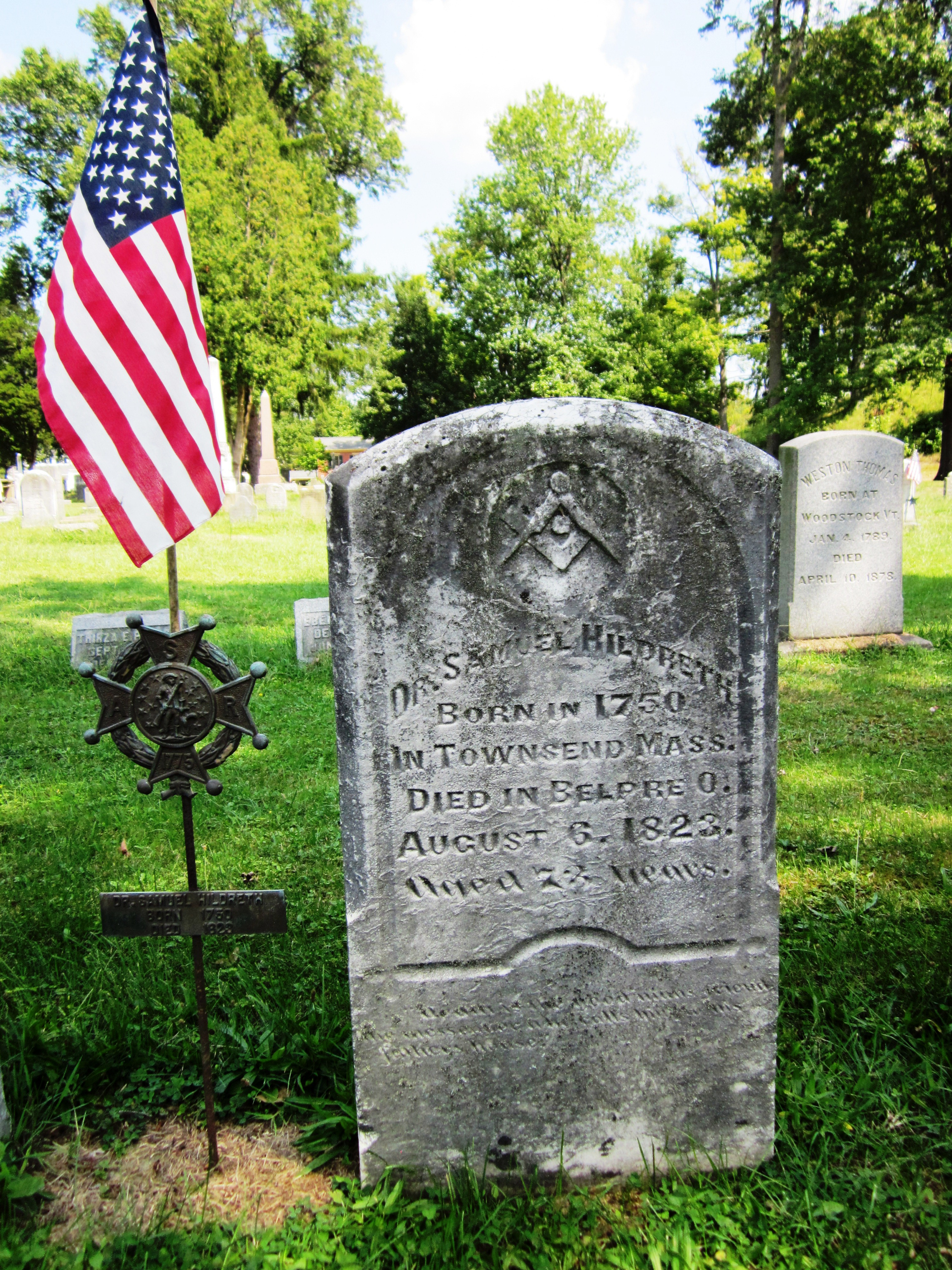
Samuel Hildreth marker

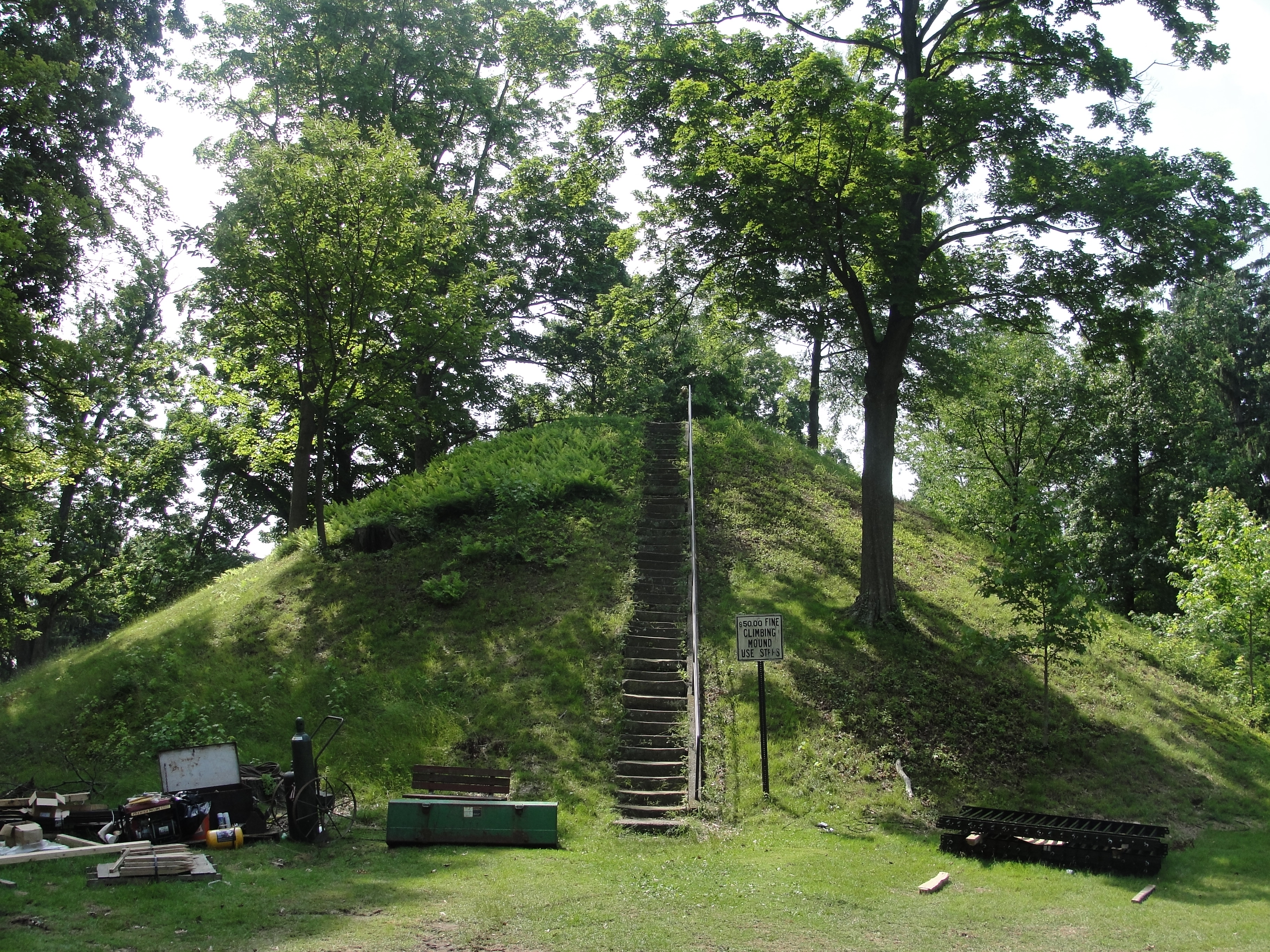

== See also ==
- List of burial mounds in the United States
- List of cemeteries in Ohio
- Category:Burials at Mound Cemetery (Marietta, Ohio)

== Bibliography ==
- Cotton, Willia Dawson (1900). Sketch of Mound Cemetery, Marietta, Ohio. Marietta, Ohio: Marietta Register Print – via Internet Archive. "There is no spot west of the Alleghenies of more historic interest than the old Mound Cemetery of Marietta, for in it are buried many of the pioneers of the Great Northwest."
- Daughters of the American Revolution (DAR): American Monthly, Vol. 16, Jan–Jun 1900, R. R. Bowker Co., New York (1900) p. 329.
- Hawley, Owen: Mound Cemetery, Marietta, Ohio, Washington County Historical Society, Marietta, Ohio (1996).
- Hildreth, S. P.: Biographical and Historical Memoirs of the Early Pioneer Settlers of Ohio, H. W. Derby and Co., Cincinnati, Ohio (1852).
- Hildreth, S. P.: Pioneer History: Being an Account of the First Examinations of the Ohio Valley, and the Early Settlement of the Northwest Territory, H. W. Derby and Co., Cincinnati, Ohio (1848).
- Johnson, Clifton: What to See in America, Macmillan Co., New York (1919) p. 224.
- Snow, Dean R. Archaeology of Native North America, Upper Saddle River: Prentice Hall, 2010.
- Summers, Thomas J.: History of Marietta, The Leader Publishing Co., Marietta, Ohio (1903) pp. 301–09.
