= List of early settlers of Marietta, Ohio =

List of letters of settlers of Marietta

Settlement of Marietta
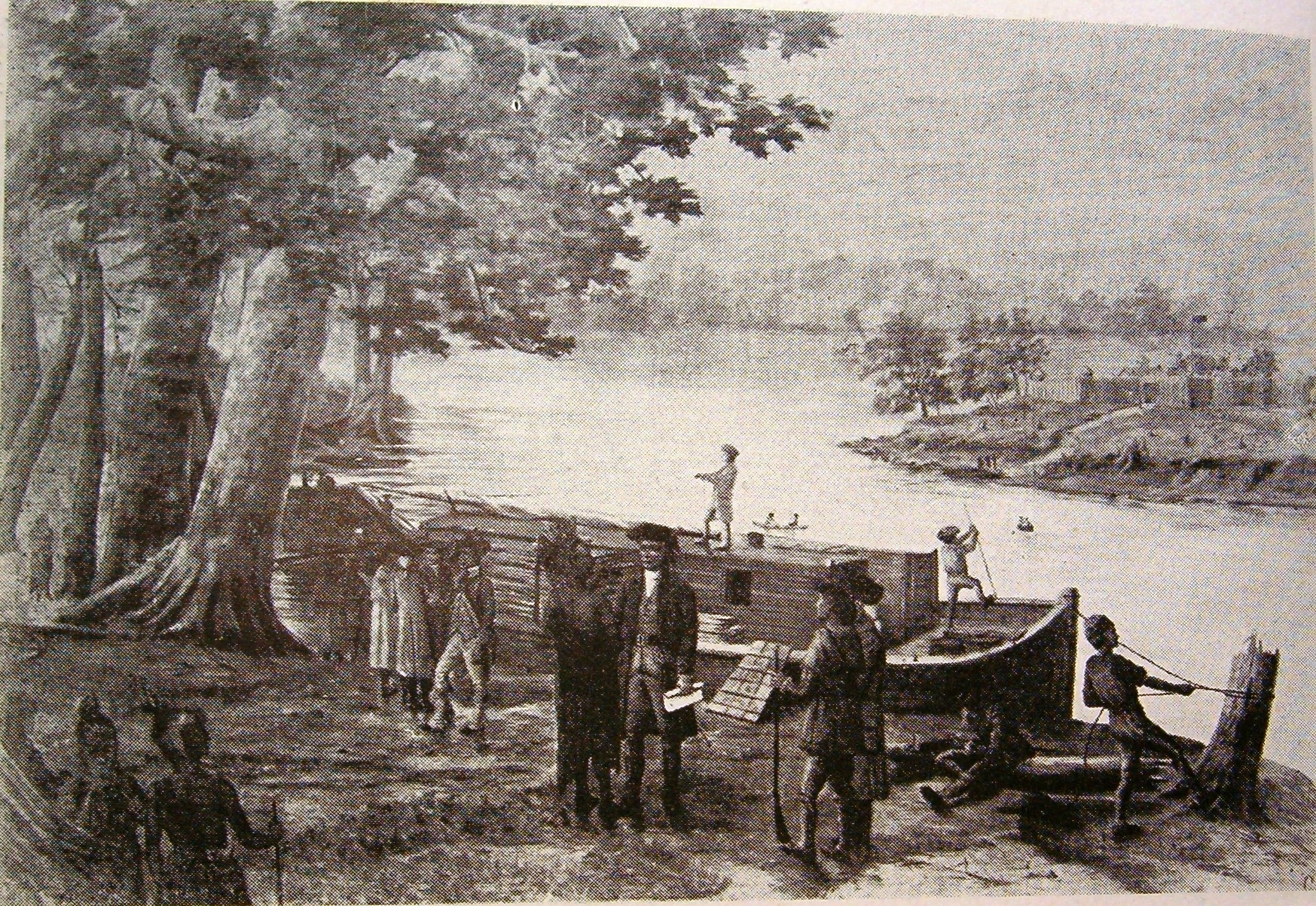
- "General Putnam landing at Marietta"
- Date: April 7, 1788
- Location: Marietta, later part of the U.S. state of Ohio
- Outcome: Founding of the first permanent American settlement of the Northwest Territory

This is a list of early settlers of Marietta, Ohio, the first permanent settlement created by United States citizens after the establishment of the Northwest Territory in 1787. The settlers included soldiers of the American Revolutionary War and members of the Ohio Company of Associates.

== Background ==
The first group of these early settlers is sometimes referred to as "the forty-eight" or the "first forty-eight", and also as the "founders of Ohio". These first 48 men were carefully chosen and vetted by several of the co-founders of the Ohio Company of Associates, Rufus Putnam and Manasseh Cutler, to ensure men of high character and bravery, as well as men with proven skills necessary to build a settlement in the wilderness. George Washington said of them: "I know many of the settlers personally, and there never were men better calculated to promote the welfare of such a community." General Lafayette, who fought with the Americans during the Revolutionary War, visited Marietta on his US tour during May 1825 and described these pioneers and former officers: "They were the bravest of brave. Better men never lived." Historian David McCullough notes that these pioneers were: "characters of historic accomplishment who were entirely unknown to most Americans".

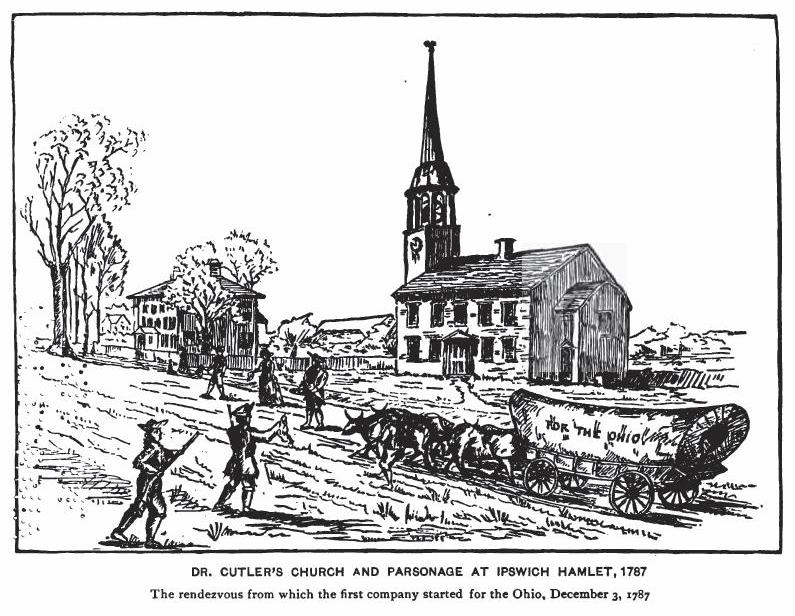
Departure of from Manasseh Cutler's parsonage in Ipswich, Massachusetts on December 3, 1787

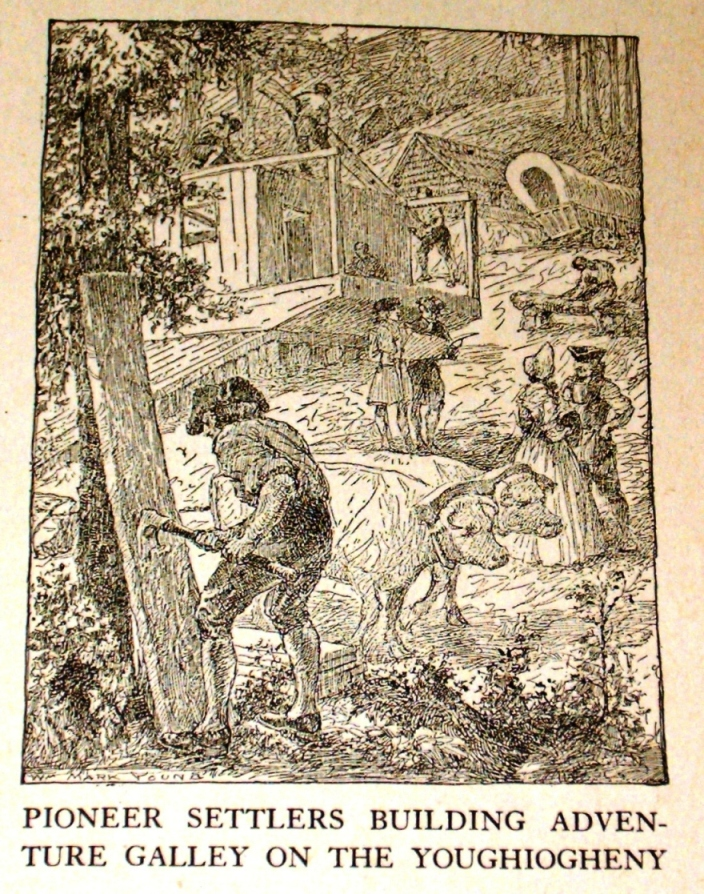
Building the flatboat, Adventure Galley, at Sumrill's Ferry on the Youghiogheny River during March 1788

Under the leadership of Putnam, two parties of pioneers comprising the first 48 men departed New England, cutting trails westward through the mountains during an uncommonly severe winter. One party departed from the towns of Ipswich, Massachusetts and Danvers, Massachusetts on December 3, 1787; the other party departed from Hartford, Connecticut on January 1, 1788. The pioneers crossed the mountains and met at Sumrill's Ferry (present-day West Newton, Pennsylvania) on the Youghiogheny River. During the bitterly cold winter, the men built three log canoes, two flatboats, the 45-ton Adventure Galley (also known as the Mayflower, in honor of their Pilgrim ancestors) and the three-ton Adelphia. This small fleet carried the pioneers down the Youghiogheny River to the Monongahela River, and then to the Ohio River, and onward to the Ohio Country and the Northwest Territory. They arrived at their final destination, the mouth of the Muskingum River at the confluence of the Ohio and Muskingum rivers, on April 7, 1788.

== First forty-eight, April 1788 ==
THE FOUNDERS OF OHIO

The footsteps of a hundred years
Have echoed, since o'er Braddock's Road
Bold Putnam and the Pioneers
Led History the way they strode.

On wild Monongahela stream
They launched the Mayflower of the West,
A perfect State their civic dream,
A new New World their pilgrim quest.

When April robed the Buckeye trees
Muskingum's bosky shore they trod;
They pitched their tents and to the breeze
Flung freedom's star-flag, thanking God.

As glides the Oyo's solemn flood
So fleeted their eventful years;
Resurgent in their children's blood,
They still live on – the Pioneers.

Their fame shrinks not to names and dates
On votive stone, the prey of time; -
Behold where monumental States
Immortalize their lives sublime!

—William Henry Venable, April 1888.

The first 48 pioneers included the following men. This group of pioneers arrived on April 7, 1788, except for Colonel Meigs, who arrived five days later on April 12, 1788, and Anselm Tupper, who arrived on April 25, according to Putnam's journal.

1. General Rufus Putnam, superintendent of the settlement, co-founder of the Ohio Company of Associates
2. Colonel Return J. Meigs Sr., surveyor
3. Colonel Ebenezer Sproat, surveyor (married to daughter of Commodore Abraham Whipple)
4. Major Anselm Tupper, surveyor (son of General Benjamin Tupper)
5. John Mathews, surveyor
6. Major Haffield White, quartermaster
7. Captain Ezekiel Cooper
8. Captain Daniel Davis
9. Captain Jonathan Devoll (Devol)
10. Captain Peregrine Foster
11. Captain William Gray
12. Captain Josiah Munroe (Munro)
13. Captain Jethro Putnam
14. Jabez Barlow
15. Daniel Bushnell
16. Phineas Coburn
17. Ebenezer Corey (Cory)
18. Samuel Cushing
19. Jarvis (Jervis) Cutler (son of Manasseh Cutler)
20. Israel Danton
21. Jonas Davis
22. Allen Devoll
23. Gilbert Devoll, Jr.
24. Isaac Dodge
25. Oliver Dodge
26. Samuel Felshaw
27. Hezekiah Flint
28. Hezekiah Flint, Jr.
29. John Gardner
30. Benjamin Griswold
31. Elizur (Elisur) Kirtland
32. Theophilus Leonard (Learned)
33. Joseph Lincoln
34. Simeon Martin
35. Henry Maxom
36. William Maxom (Mason)
37. William Miller
38. William Moulton
39. Edmond (Edmund) Moulton
40. Amos Porter, Jr.
41. Allen Putnam
42. Benjamin Shaw
43. Earl Sproat
44. David Wallace (Wallis)
45. Joseph Wells
46. Josiah White
47. Peletiah White
48. Josiah Whitridge
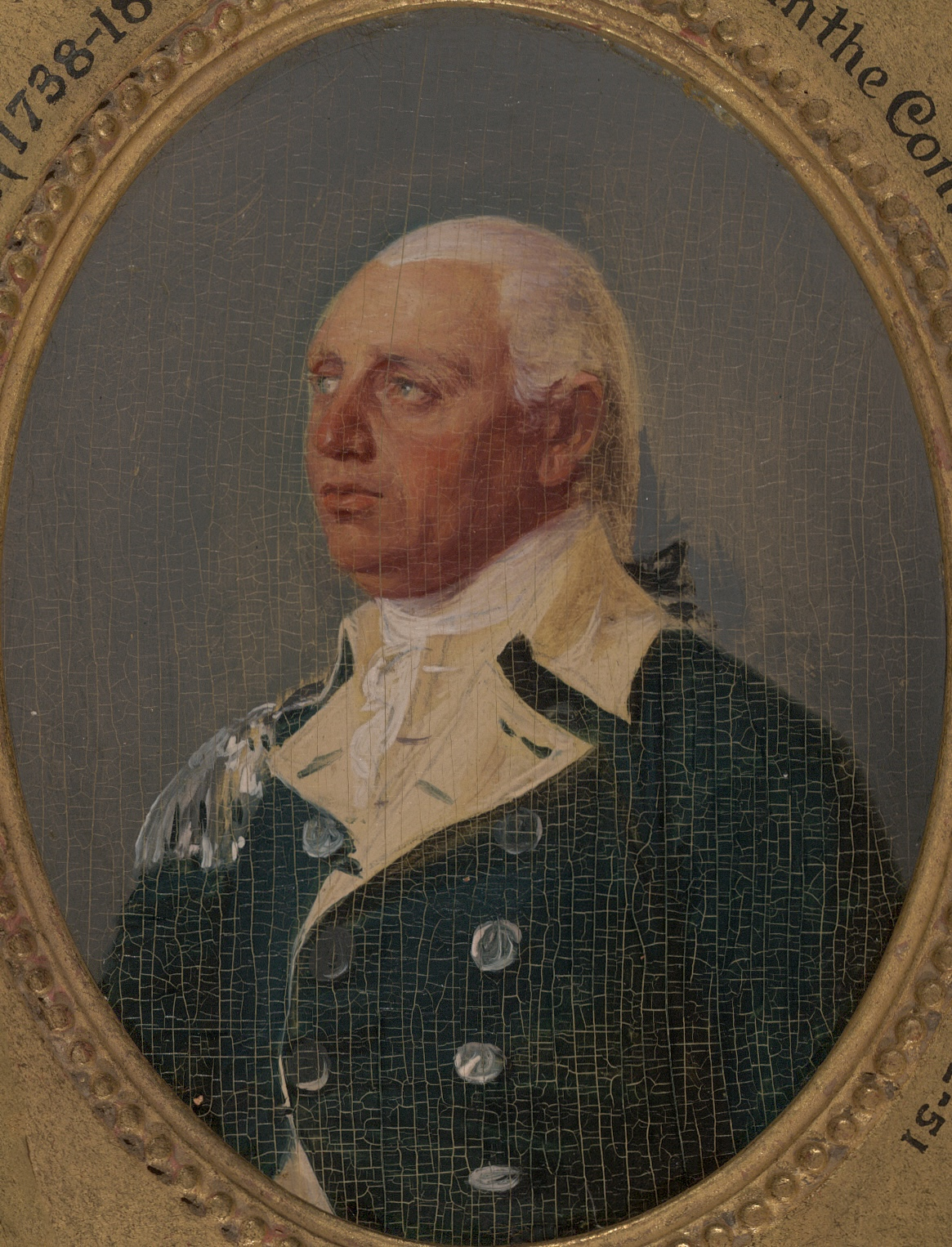
Rufus Putnam

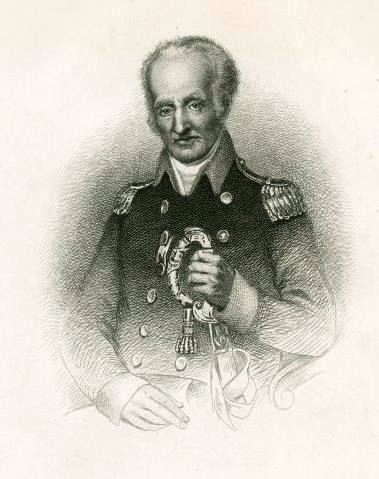
Return J. Meigs, Sr.

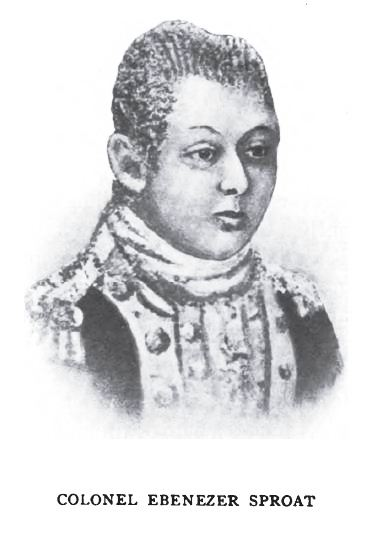
Ebenezer Sproat

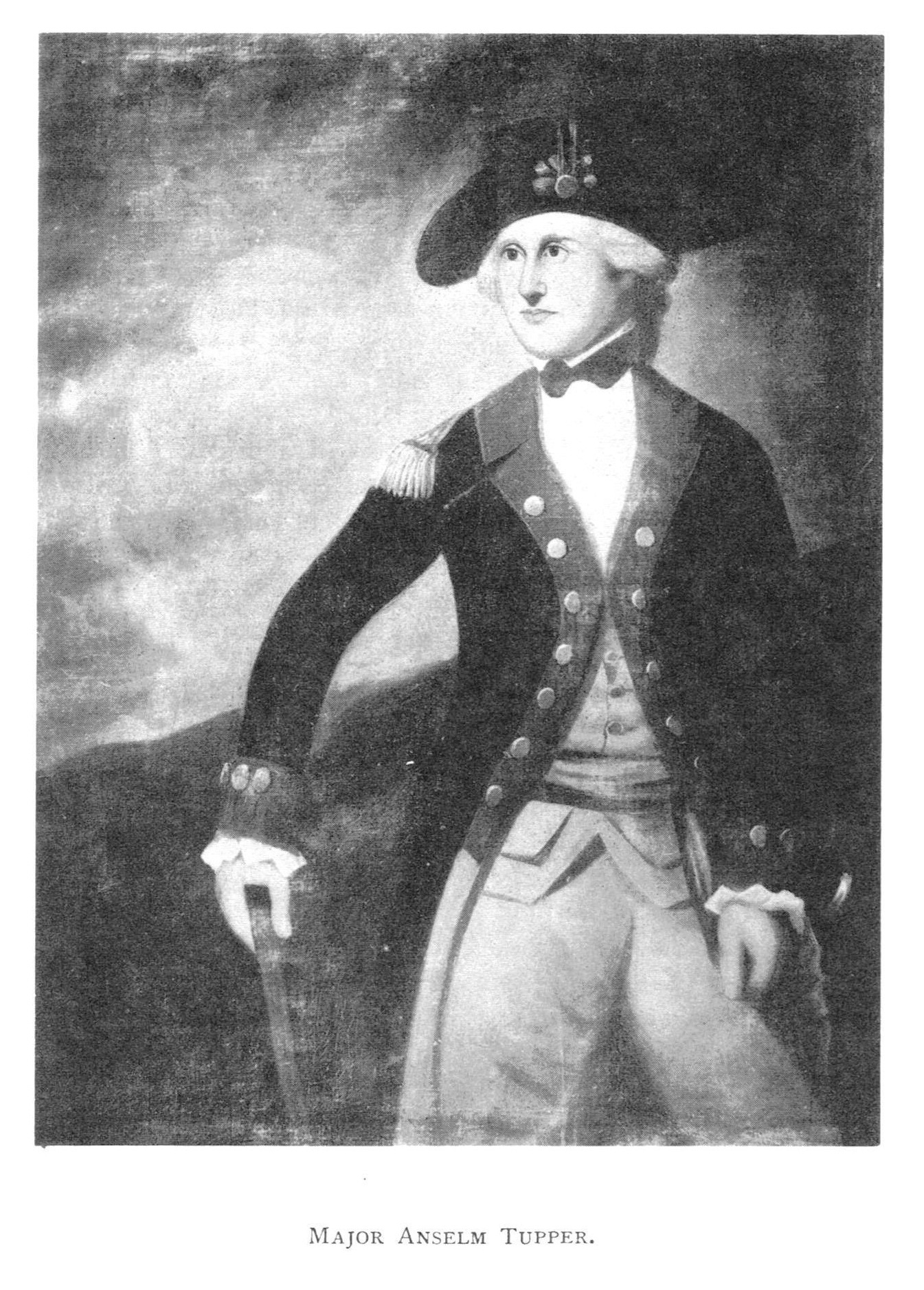
Anselm Tupper

== May 1788 ==
LANDING OF THE PIONEERS
At the Mouth of the Muskingum, Ohio, April 7, 1788.

"A song of the Early Times out West,"
And that bold adventurous band
Who first set foot upon these shores
Where now their children stand;
Who fell'd the lordly forest tree
And built the Cabin Home,
Resolved on meeting valiantly
All dangers that might come.
A strong and hardy race were they,
To wield the axe and hoe,
When first they came as Pioneers,
Just sixty years ago!

The April winds swept o'er the hills
And bowed the forest tree,
And wild-wood flowers were blossoming,
And birds were singing free,
The wild deer bounded o'er the plain,
The wolf's long howl was heard
And oft the panther's fearful scream
The stoutest bosom stirr'd,
The wily Indian roam'd the wood
And sprung his bended bow,
When first they came as Pioneers,
Just sixty years ago!

But like a band of brothers then
Our worthy Fathers stood,
And met with firm and cheerful front
The dangers of the wood;
E'en woman's heart grew bold and strong
Amid the toil and fear,
And with unshrinking heart and hand
Gave comfort, aid, and cheer.
Sweet were the social joys of life-
Few others did they know-
When first they came as Pioneers,
Just sixty years ago!

But years rolled on and swept away
Their trials and their foes,
And soon the wilderness was made
To blossom as the rose,
The bleating of the gentle sheep,
The lowing of the kine,
Were heard, where once the panther screamed
In days of Old Lang Syne.
Our worthy Sires, all danger o'er
Now felt life's joyous flow-
Nor mourned that they were Pioneers,
Just sixty years ago!

But few are left to bless us now
Of all the honored band-
And they, ere long, must pass away
Into the spirit land.
Oh may their fleeting years be blest
By Sympathy and Love!
Till God shall call each wanderer home
To dwell with him above.
And may we all by well spent lives,
Of strength and virtue show
We're worthy of the Noble Sires
Of sixty years ago!

—Frances Dana Gage, circa 1848.

Arrivals the following month, May 1788, included:

- General Samuel Holden Parsons
- Colonel John May
- Colonel Israel Putnam (son of General Israel Putnam)
- Colonel William Stacy
- Major Winthrop Sargent
- Captain William Dana
- Aaron Putnam
- Jonathan Stone
- Lisbeth
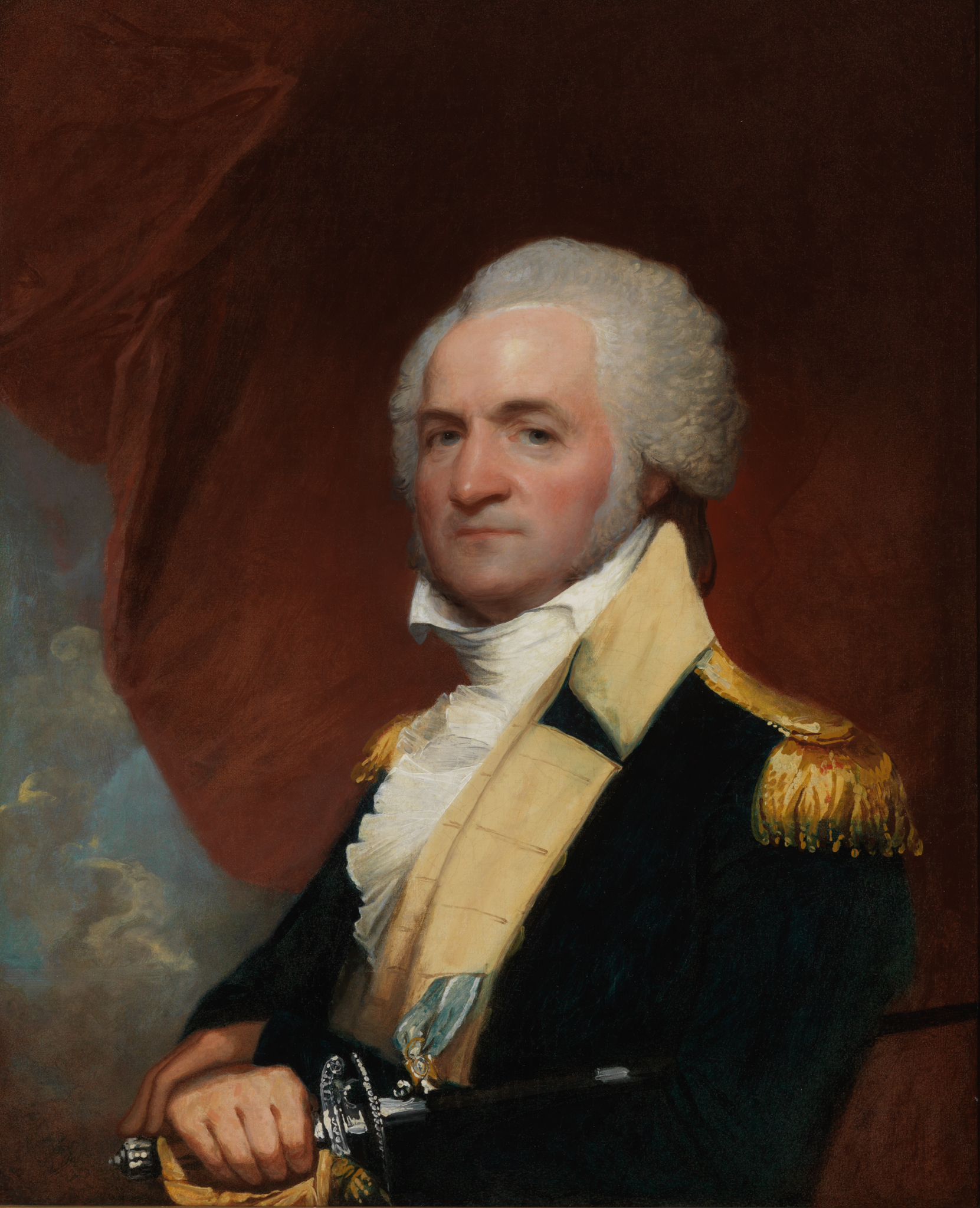
Winthrop Sargent

== June 1788 ==
During June 1788, several more settlers arrived, including the first woman settler:

- James Owen and his wife, Mary Owen, the first woman settler
- Dr. Jabez True
- General James Varnum
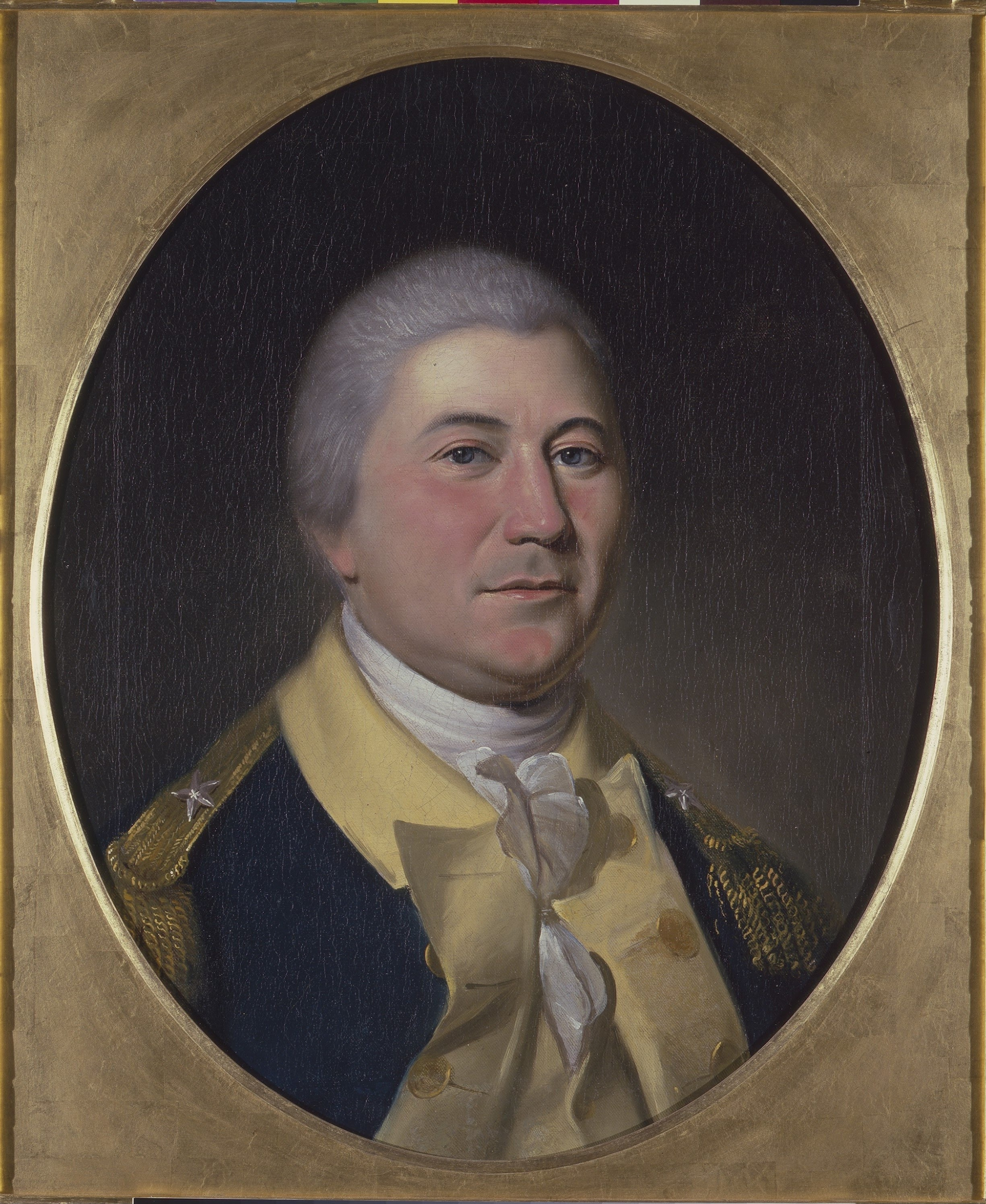
James Varnum

== August 1788 ==
During August 1788, General Benjamin Tupper and his extended family arrived.

- General Benjamin Tupper, co-founder of the Ohio Company of Associates
- Colonel Ichabod Nye and his wife Minerva Nye (daughter of Gen. Tupper)
- Major Asa Coburn
- Andrew Webster
- The Cushing and Goodale families

== 1788 and 1789 ==
Other notable arrivals included:

- Quartermaster Griffin Greene (cousin of General Nathanael Greene)
- Commander Abraham Whipple
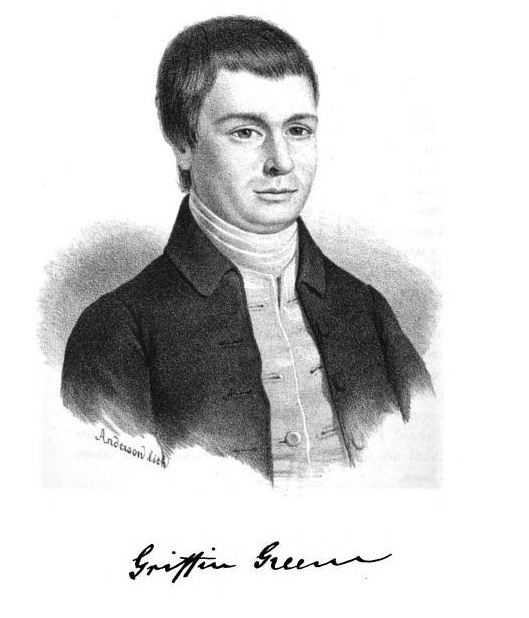
Griffin Greene

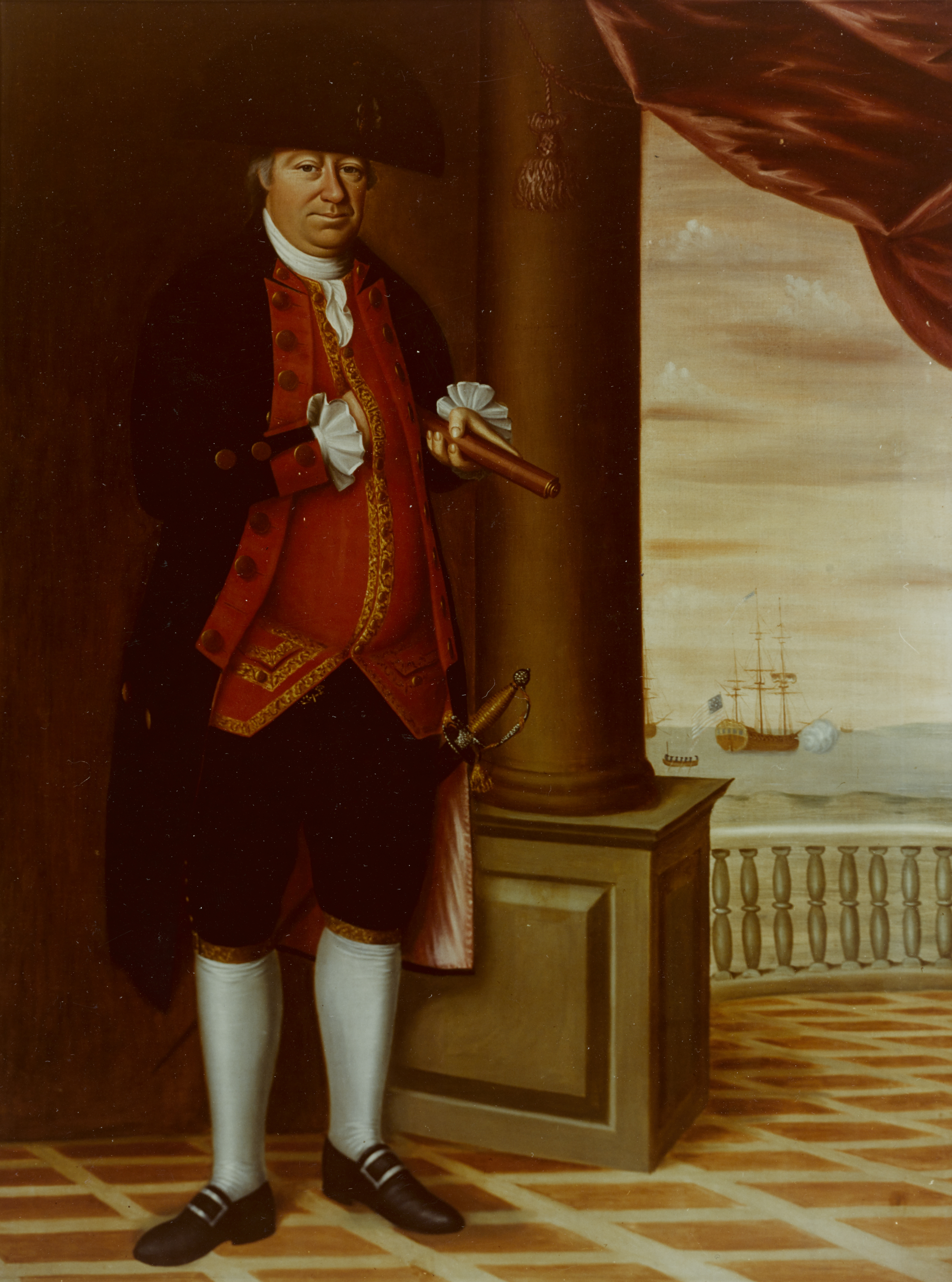
Abraham Whipple

== Legacy ==
During 1852 the president of the Ohio Historical Society described these pioneers: "So various and eventful lives as theirs have scarcely ever fallen to the lot of man. They were born under a monarchy,—fought the battle of Independence,—assisted in the baptism of a great republic,—then moved into a wilderness,—and laid the foundations of a State,—itself almost equaling an empire. These men not only lived in remarkable times, but were themselves remarkable men. Energetic, industrious, persevering, honest, bold, and free — they were limited in their achievements only by the limits of possibility. Successful alike in field and forest,—they have, at length, gone to their rest,—leaving names which are a part of the fame and the history of their country". On the centennial anniversary of the Marietta settlement, Senator George F. Hoar of Massachusetts orated, "It was an illustrious band; they were men of exceptional character, talents and attainments; they were the best of New England culture; they were Revolutionary heroes".

"Can too much be said in praise of the noble heroes who opened to settlement the Great Northwest Territory? These men had been trained in army life and discipline and were anxious to take this country as the payment due them for military service. They were men who had fought valiantly to preserve the principles of their government and were ready for other great achievements. They were men who had assisted in making this territory a part of the United States and had, in great measure, assisted in the formation and adoption of the Ordinance of 1787 which was to govern it. Indeed, a better company of men could scarcely have been selected than those who were directed by General Putnam."

Within 50 years, the 48 people who, on April 7, 1788, disembarked from the 'Adventure Galley' at the mouth of the Muskingum River, grew in the area to a population of about 1.5 million.

These early American pioneers to the Northwest Territory have been memorialized in verse and book. The poem, Landing of the Pioneers, was written sixty years after the landing by Frances Dana Gage, and included in her book of poems published in 1867. The poem, The Founders of Ohio, was written in 1888 during the centennial of the event by William Henry Venable, and was published later in several books of poems. The book Pioneer History (1848) by Samuel Prescott Hildreth describes the early civil history of the Northwest Territory in Ohio; Hildreth's book Early Pioneer Settlers of Ohio (1852) provides biographies of the earliest settlers. Many of these early pioneers are buried in Marietta at Mound Cemetery. The film Opening the Door West, chronicling the pioneers, aired on Ohio PBS during the 2003 Ohio Bicentennial.

In 1888, the Adventure Galley III recreated the journey of the original pioneer 'Adventure Galley'. In 1984 this journey was again recreated aboard the Adventure Galley II (actually the fourth boat by the name Adventure Galley), captained by Vaughn P. Wendland. This Adventure Galley IV is on display at the Behringer-Crawford museum in Cincinnati, Ohio.
