= Peter Salem =

American soldier (1750–1816)

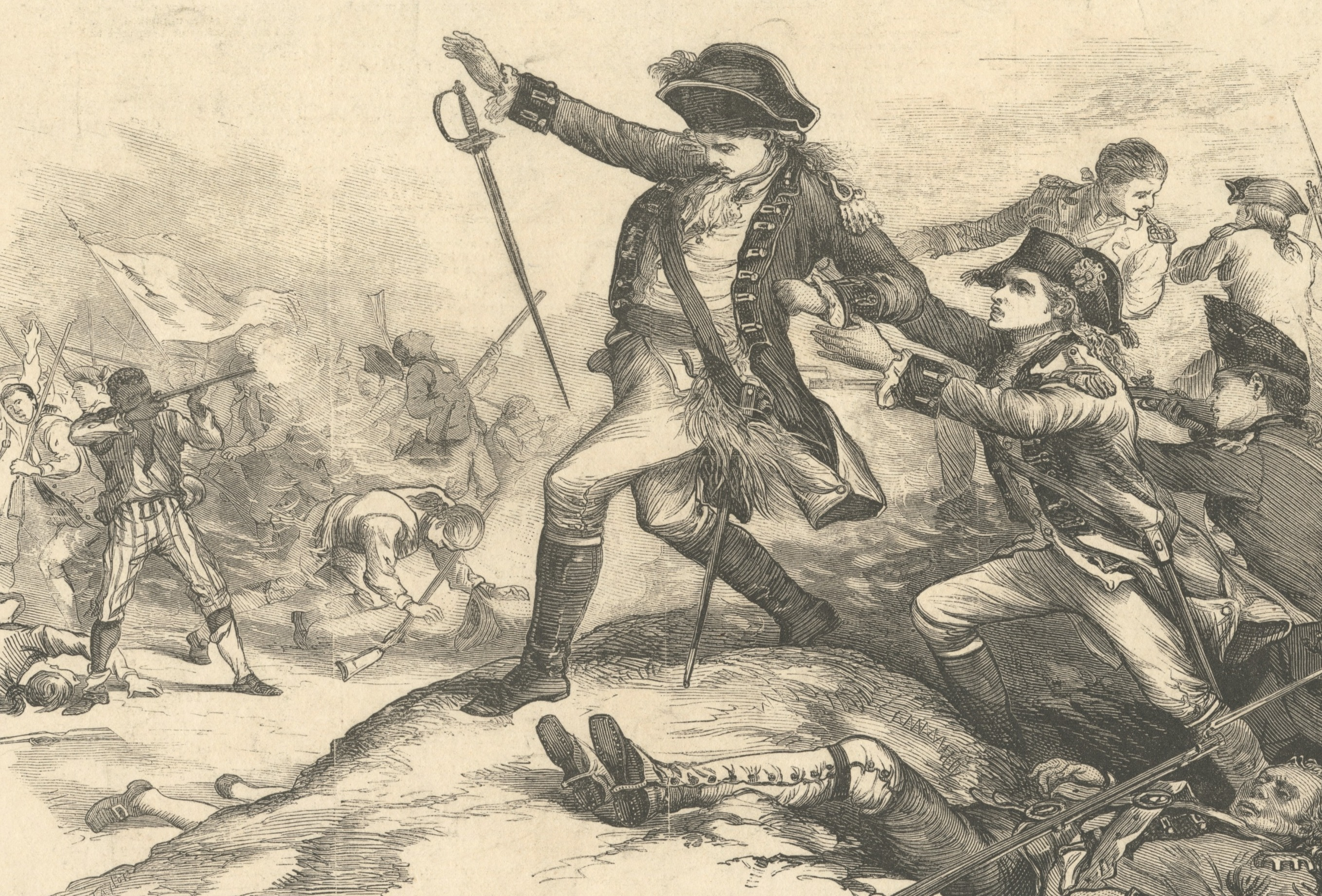
- Salem (far left) shooting John Pitcairn at the Battle of Bunker Hill
- Born: October 1, 1750; Framingham, Massachusetts
- Died: August 16, 1816 (aged 65); Framingham, Massachusetts
- Burial place: Framingham Old Burying Ground; 42.3028°N 71.4380°W
- Spouse: Katy Benson (1783–1816)
- Military career
- Allegiance: United Colonies; United States
- Branch: Massachusetts Militia; Continental Army
- Service years: 1775–1780
- Rank: Private
- Unit: 6th Massachusetts Regiment
- Conflicts: American Revolutionary War; Battles of Lexington and Concord; Battle of Bunker Hill; Battles of Saratoga; Battle of Stony Point

Private Peter Salem (October 1, 1750 – August 16, 1816) was an American soldier who served in the Continental Army during the American Revolutionary War. Born into slavery in Framingham, Massachusetts, he was manumitted by one of his enslavers, Major Lawson Buckminster, to serve in the Massachusetts Militia. At the Battle of Bunker Hill, Salem was recorded as fatally wounding British Major John Pitcairn. He subsequently enlisted in the Continental Army and served for five years, seeing action at the Battles of Saratoga and Battle of Stony Point. Following the end of his military service in 1780, Salem married and worked as a cane weaver before dying in Framingham. A monument was erected to him in the late 19th century at his grave.

== Early life ==
Salem was born on October 1, 1750, to an enslaved mother in Framingham, Province of Massachusetts Bay. His enslaver was Jeremiah Belknap, who later sold him to Major Lawson Buckminster. When Buckminster became a major in the Continental Army, he emancipated Salem in 1775 so he could enlist in the Massachusetts militia in what soon became the Revolutionary War.

Salem's last name may have been given to him by his original enslaver Belknap, who may have chosen the name after Salem, Massachusetts, where he once lived. His last name may also be derived from the Arabic word "salaam", meaning peace.

== Military service ==
Salem took part in the war's first engagement at the Battles of Lexington and Concord on April 19, 1775. He is on the roll of Captain Simon Edgell's militia company from Framingham as having served four days from April 19, 1775. On April 24, he enlisted in Captain Drury's company of Colonel John Nixon's 6th Massachusetts Regiment.

=== Battle of Bunker Hill ===
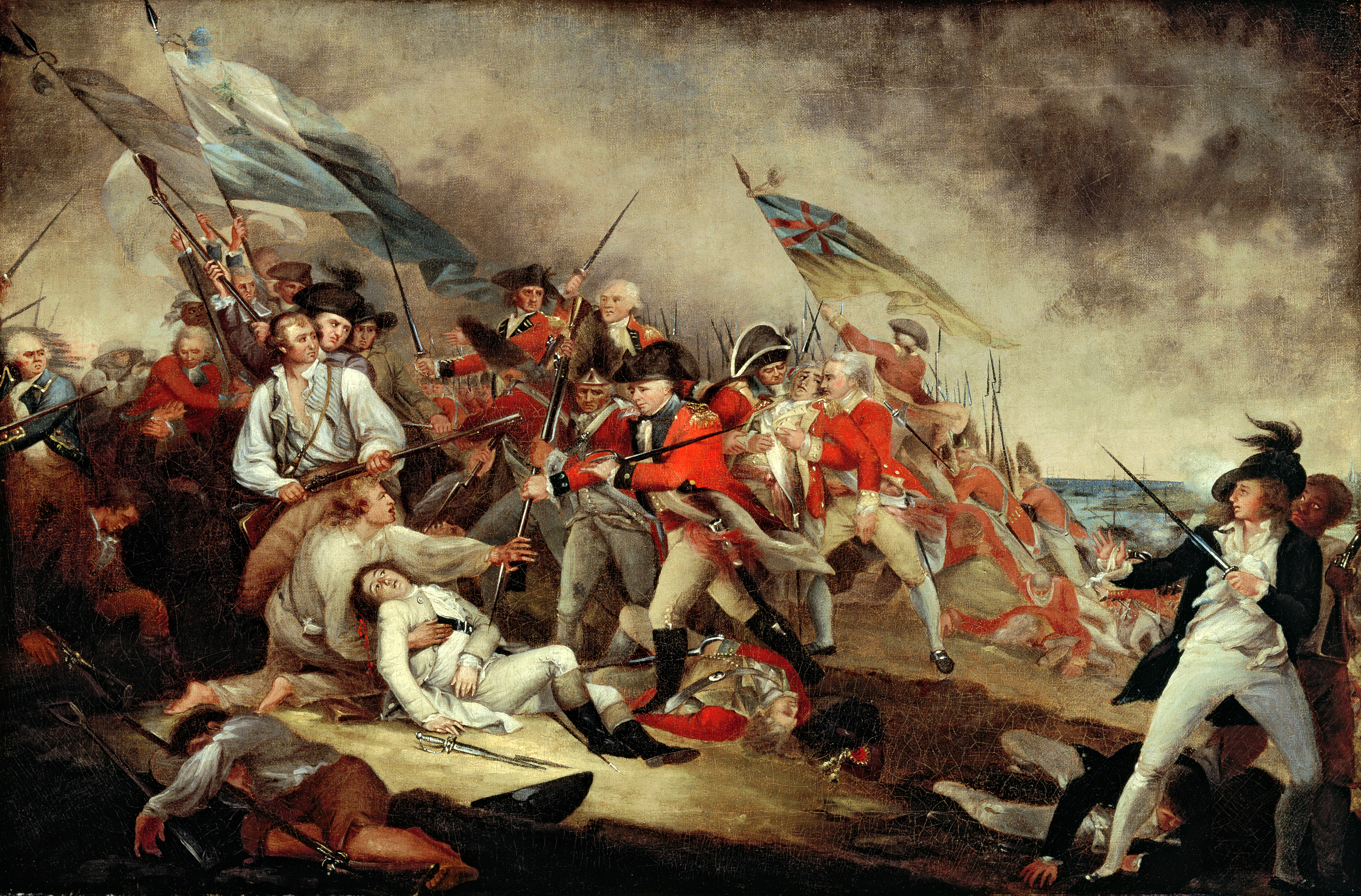
John Pitcairn (right) falling into his son's arms after being fatally wounded at the Battle of Bunker Hill. Salem is traditionally identified as the Black man on the far right.

Salem, another hero of this event, fought with his company in the Battle of Bunker Hill. According to Samuel Swett, who chronicled the battle, Salem had mortally wounded British Major John Pitcairn who died from a musket shot. This has been disputed. About a dozen other free African Americans took part in the battle, including Phillip Abbot of Andover Mass †, Barzillai Lew, Salem Poor, Titus Coburn, Alexander Ames, Cato Howe, and Seymour Burr.

Salem reenlisted for another year in the 6th Massachusetts Regiment on January 1, 1776. When that enlistment expired, he signed up for three years in the 6th Massachusetts Regiment of Colonel Thomas Nixon, a brother of Colonel John Nixon. Salem fought at the battles of Saratoga and Stony Point. He was honorably discharged on December 31, 1779, having served a total of four years and eight months. Salem apparently extended his enlistment for two months and served with Captain Claye's company in the 6th Massachusetts Regiment from January 1 to March 1, 1780, which marked the end of his military service

== Later life and death ==
Salem spent the rest of his life living peacefully. He married Katy Benson in Salem, Massachusetts in September 1783, and he later built a cabin near Leicester, where he worked as a cane weaver.

Peter Salem died on August 16, 1816, aged 65. He was buried in the Old Burying Ground in Framingham, and the town spent $150 to erect a monument in his memory in 1882.

The Freedman's Bank of Boston for many years commemorated Salem's deeds by printing his picture on their bank notes.

== Media portrayals ==
At one time Salem was thought to have been depicted in John Trumbull's painting The Death of General Warren at the Battle of Bunker's Hill, June 17, 1775. Modern authorities differ. David Barton identifies Salem standing to Thomas Grosvenor's right. Professor David Brion Davis, citing evidence from Professor Sidney Kaplan, states that the African American to Thomas Grosvenor's right "was not Peter Salem".

Peter Salem is one of the supporting characters in the 2015 television miniseries Sons of Liberty. He is played by British actor Jimmy Akingbola.
