= Benjamin Tupper =

American soldier and pioneer (1738–1792)

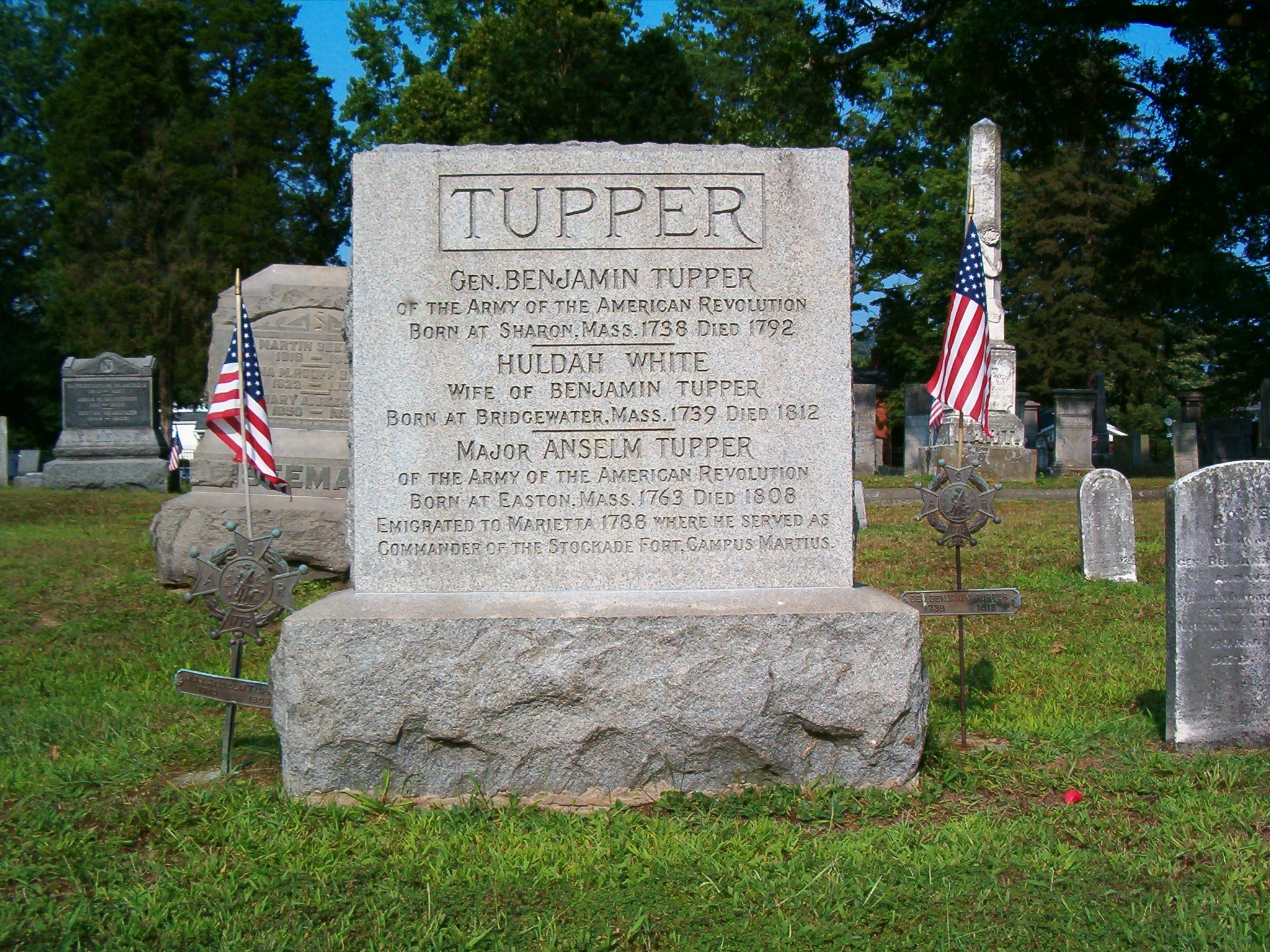
- Benjamin Tupper marker at Mound Cemetery, Marietta, Ohio
- Born: March 11, 1738; Sharon, Massachusetts, British America
- Died: June 7, 1792 (aged 54); Marietta, Northwest Territory, U.S.
- Burial place: Mound Cemetery (Marietta, Ohio)
- Relatives: Huldah White, 1762–1792, sons: Maj. Anselm Tupper; Gen. Edward W. Tupper; Col. Benjamin Tupper, Jr.
- Military career
- Allegiance: United States of America
- Branch: Continental Army
- Rank: Brigadier General
- Commands: 6th Massachusetts Regiment, 10th Massachusetts Regiment, 11th Massachusetts Regiment
- Conflicts: American Revolutionary War; Siege of Boston; Battle of Saratoga; Battle of Monmouth
- Other work: Pioneer to the Ohio Country

Benjamin Tupper (March 11, 1738 – June 7, 1792) was an American soldier in the French and Indian War, and an officer of the Continental Army during the American Revolutionary War, achieving the rank of brevet brigadier general. Subsequently, he served as a Massachusetts legislator, and he assisted Gen. William Shepard in stopping Shays' Rebellion. Benjamin Tupper was a co-founder of the Ohio Company of Associates, and was a pioneer to the Ohio Country, involved in establishing Marietta as the first permanent settlement in the Northwest Territory.

== Early life ==
Benjamin Tupper, the youngest of eight children, was born in a precinct of Stoughton in the Province of Massachusetts Bay, now a part of the town of Sharon, Massachusetts. His father died when he was young; Benjamin then worked as an apprentice to a tanner in Dorchester near Boston. At the age of sixteen, he began working on a farm in Chesterfield in western Massachusetts. As a young man, Benjamin Tupper served as a soldier during the French and Indian War for two or three years. During that time, he also ran a district school in Easton, Massachusetts during the winters. At the age of 24, he married Huldah White in Easton, and they subsequently relocated to Chesterfield. He served as a lieutenant of the militia in Chesterfield.

== Revolutionary War ==
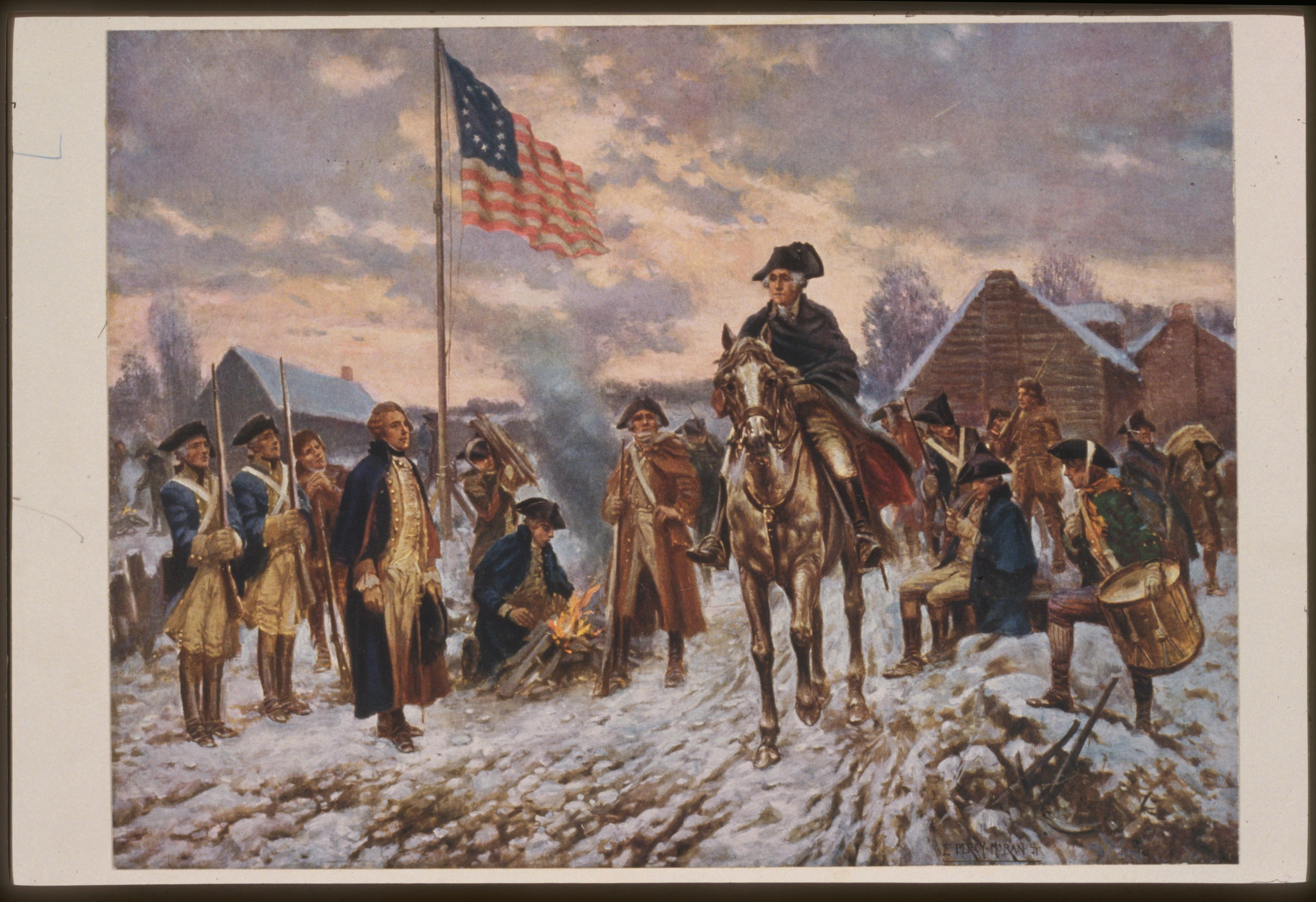
Valley Forge

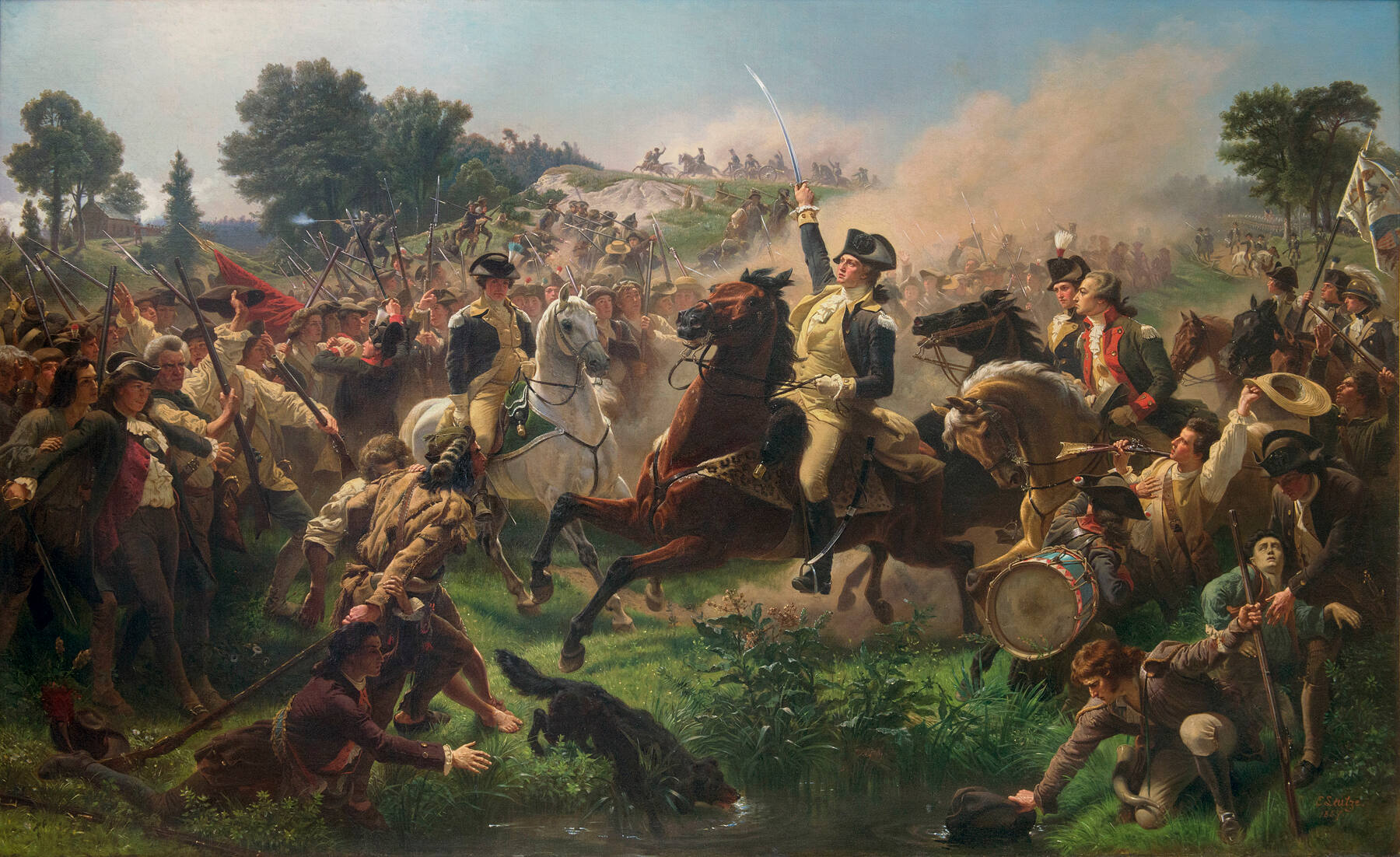
Battle of Monmouth

Benjamin Tupper was in the field with the Continental Army throughout the American Revolutionary War. He engaged as major with Col. John Fellows' Massachusetts regiment at the beginning of the war in April 1775, several days after the Battles of Lexington and Concord. Maj. Tupper participated in the Siege of Boston during 1775. During the siege he led an expedition against British forces on Castle Island and the Boston Light in Boston harbor. During the expedition, his troops skirmished with British and Tories, and burned the lighthouse to hinder the movement of British naval ships. He was promoted to lieutenant colonel in late 1775.

After the Battle of Long Island in 1776, Lt. Col. Tupper commanded gunboats on the North River (the southernmost portion of the Hudson River) near New York City. Describing an engagement of Tupper's gunboats with the British, Gen. George Washington wrote "... our officers and men, during the whole of the affair, behaved with great spirit and bravery." Benjamin Tupper was promoted to colonel during July 1777. Later that year, Col. Tupper served under Gen. Horatio Gates at Saratoga. Col. Tupper and his 11th Massachusetts Regiment wintered at Valley Forge with Gen. Washington during the winter and spring of 1777 and 1778.

During 1778, Col. Tupper served with Gen. Washington at the Battle of Monmouth; during the action, Tupper's horse was killed under him. During 1780 he served in the Highlands Department and was in charge of the Great Chain across the Hudson River at West Point. He served in the northern frontier of New York during the rest of the war as commanding officer of the 10th Massachusetts Regiment, and then the 6th Massachusetts Regiment. During September 1783, he achieved the rank of brevet brigadier general.

== Post-war and the Ohio Country ==
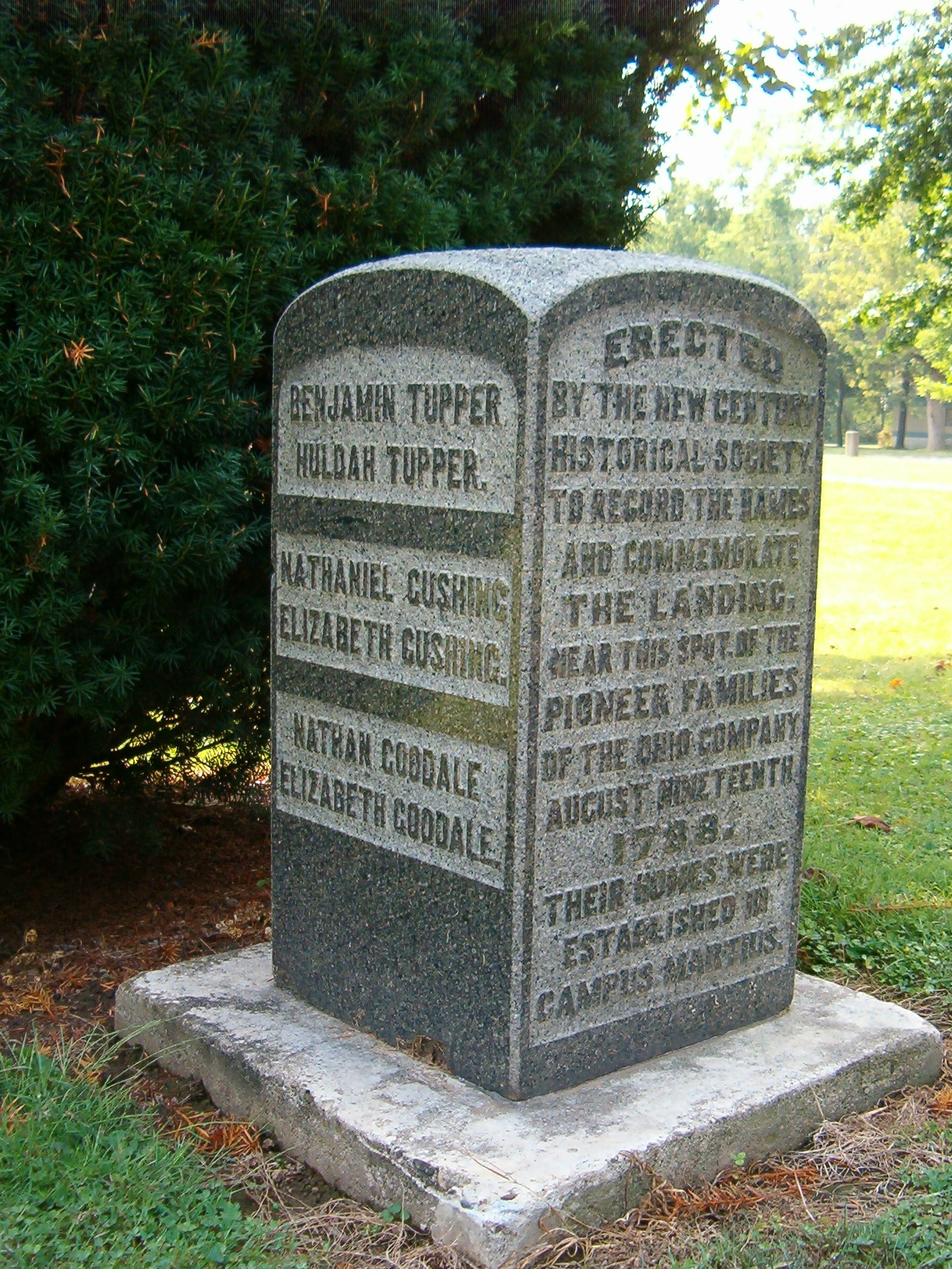
Monument at Marietta, Ohio to pioneer families including Benjamin and Huldah Tupper

At the close of the war Gen. Tupper returned to his family at Chesterfield, and became a member of the Massachusetts Legislature. During 1786, Benjamin Tupper and Rufus Putnam founded the Ohio Company of Associates. During that year, Benjamin Tupper was appointed as surveyor for the state of Massachusetts for the surveying of the Seven Ranges in the Ohio Country. During 1787, he volunteered his services to Massachusetts militia Gen. William Shepard to assist in suppressing Shays' Rebellion; Gen. Tupper helped organize volunteers for the militia, and was with Gen Shepard defending the Springfield, Massachusetts armory when Shays attacked and was defeated.

During 1788, Benjamin Tupper and other pioneers of the Ohio Company of Associates arrived at the confluence of the Ohio and Muskingum rivers to establish Marietta, Ohio as the first permanent American settlement in the Northwest Territory. In August 1788, he invented a screw propeller, positioned in the stern of a boat, and turned with a crank. Manasseh Cutler wrote about the propeller that "It succeeded to admiration, and I think it a very useful discovery." During September 1788, Benjamin Tupper and Rufus Putnam were the justices of the first civil court in the Northwest Territory. Benjamin Tupper was a prominent member of the pioneer settlement of Marietta. He was an original member of the Society of the Cincinnati, and an original member of the American Union Lodge No. 1 of Freemasons at Marietta, along with several others including his son Anselm Tupper, William Stacy, and Rufus Putnam.

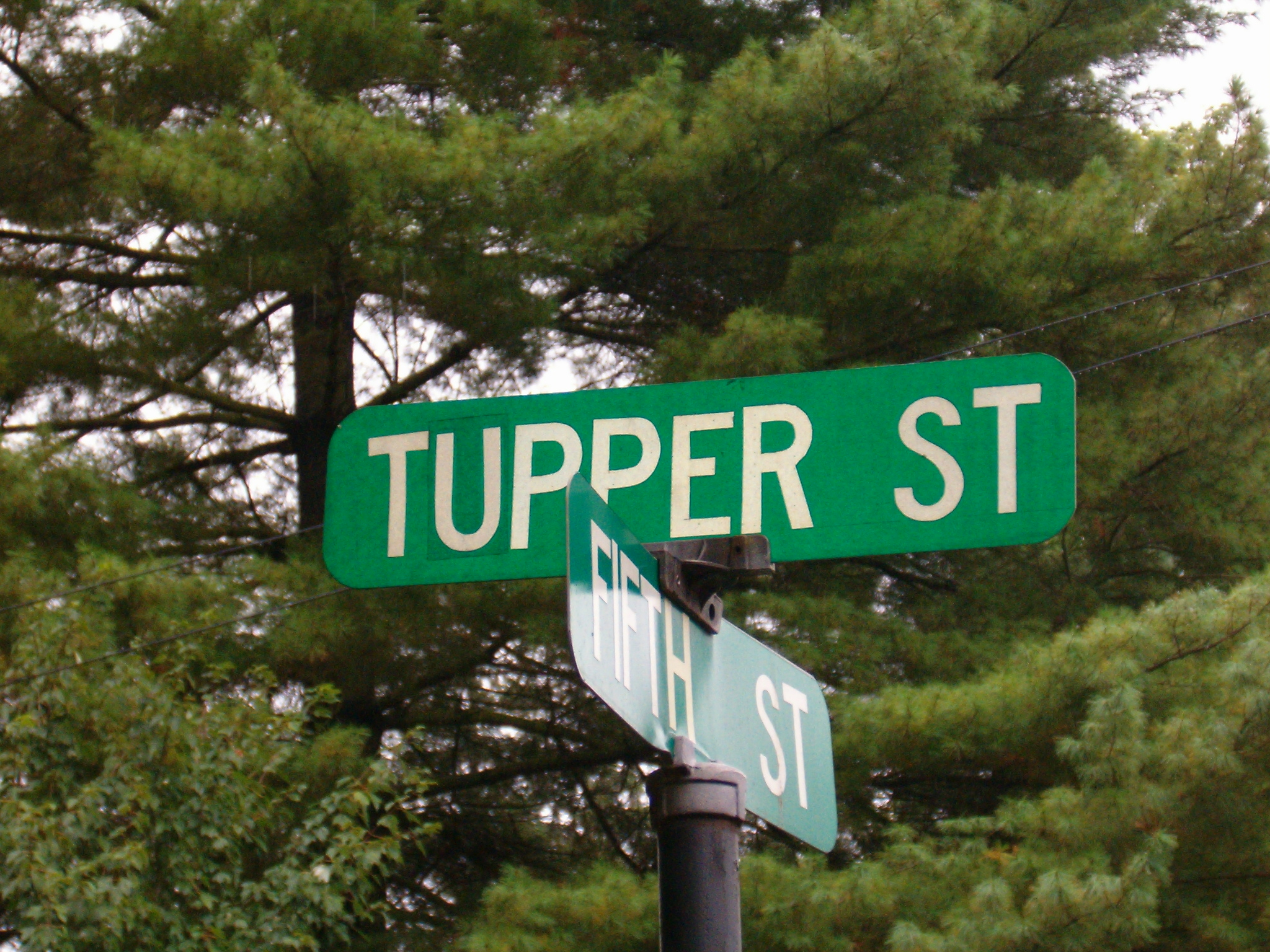
Tupper Street sign near Mound Cemetery in Marietta, Ohio

Benjamin Tupper's sons were Maj. Anselm Tupper, Gen. Edward W. Tupper, and Col. Benjamin Tupper, Jr. His daughters were Sophia, Minerva, and Roewena, who married Gov. Winthrop Sargent in the first marriage ceremony in the Northwest Territory. Another daughter, Huldah, died young.

Benjamin Tupper died in June 1792. A visitor to the Marietta settlement witnessed the funeral, and wrote that:

Gen. Tupper, who had died the day before, was buried on the 17th. In consideration of the four different offices which he held, firstly as General in the service of the United States in the late war; secondly as member of the Society of the Cincinnati; thirdly as director of the Ohio Company; and fourthly as master among the Freemasons, therefore, because of these positions, great honors were shown his remains at the funeral.

Benjamin Tupper is buried with many other Revolutionary War soldiers and pioneers at Mound Cemetery in Marietta.

== Bibliography ==
- Cotton, Willia Dawson: Sketch of Mound Cemetery, Marietta, Ohio, Marietta Register Print, Marietta, Ohio (1900).
- Drake, Francis S.: Memorials of the Society of Cincinnati of Massachusetts, Boston (1873).
- Hawley, Owen: Mound Cemetery, Marietta, Ohio, Washington County Historical Society, Marietta, Ohio (1996).
- Heitman, Francis B.: Officers of the Continental Army during the War of the Revolution, Rare Book Shop Publishing Co., Washington, D.C. (1914).
- Hildreth, S. P.: Biographical and Historical Memoirs of the Early Pioneer Settlers of Ohio, H. W. Derby and Co., Cincinnati, Ohio (1852).
- Hildreth, S. P.: Pioneer History: Being an Account of the First Examinations of the Ohio Valley, and the Early Settlement of the Northwest Territory, H. W. Derby and Co., Cincinnati, Ohio (1848).
- Howe, Henry (1891). Historical Collections of Ohio. Vol. III. Columbus, Ohio: Henry Howe and Son.
- Hulbert, Archer Butler: The Records of the Original Proceedings of the Ohio Company, Volume I, Marietta Historical Commission, Marietta, Ohio (1917).
- Hulbert, Archer Butler: The Records of the Original Proceedings of the Ohio Company, Volume II, Marietta Historical Commission, Marietta, Ohio (1917).
- Smith, B. A. and Vining, J. W.: American Geographers, 1784–1812, Praeger Publishers, Westport, Connecticut (2003).
- Summers, Thomas J.: History of Marietta, The Leader Publishing Co., Marietta, Ohio (1903).
