= 11th Massachusetts Regiment =

- Active: September 16, 1776–January 1, 1781
- Disbanded: January 1, 1781
- Allegiance: Continental Congress of the United States
- Branch: Infantry
- Part of: Massachusetts Line
- Engagements: American Revolutionary War: Hubbardton; Saratoga; Monmouth

Commanders
- Notable commanders: Colonel Ebenezer Francis; Colonel Benjamin Tupper

The 11th Massachusetts Regiment was a unit of the Continental Army during the American Revolutionary War.

== Service history ==
Authorization for the formation of the regiment was given on September 16, 1776. The unit was originally known as Francis's Regiment. In early 1777, it was organized at Boston, Massachusetts, from eight companies. It was commanded by Colonel Ebenezer Francis. On July 7, 1777, Francis's Regiment was engaged at the Battle of Hubbardton, where it repulsed two British charges, but was defeated by a third attack. Francis was killed during the fighting. The regiment then became known as Tupper's Regiment. The next month, it was assigned to the 3rd Massachusetts Brigade. The regiment saw action at the Battle of Saratoga and the Battle of Monmouth. Another company was added to its organization in May 1779, and it was formally renamed the 11th Massachusetts Regiment on August 1, 1779. On January 1, 1781, it was disbanded at West Point, New York.

Colonel Ebenezer Francis was commanding officer of the 11th Massachusetts Regiment from November 6, 1776, until July 7, 1777, when he was killed at the Battle of Hubbardton. Colonel Benjamin Tupper was commanding officer from July 1, 1777, until January 1, 1781.

== Sources ==
- Furneaux, Rupert (1983) [1971]. The Battle of Saratoga. New York City: Scarborough Books. ISBN 0-8128-6125-6.
- Wright, Robert K. (1983). The Continental Army. Washington, D.C.: Center of Military History, United States Army.
