= 10th Massachusetts Regiment =

- Active: 1776–1783
- Allegiance: Continental Congress of the United States
- Type: Infantry
- Part of: Massachusetts Line
- Engagements: Saratoga and Monmouth

Commanders
- Notable commanders: Colonel Marshall, Colonel Benjamin Tupper

The 10th Massachusetts Regiment was a military regiment in the American Revolutionary War. It was authorized on 16 September 1776, in the Continental Army under Colonel Marshall at Boston, Massachusetts, as eight companies of volunteers from Worcester, Middlesex, Essex, Bristol, Hampshire, Plymouth, and Suffolk counties of the colony of Massachusetts and Cheshire county of the colony of New Hampshire. On 13 August 1777, the regiment was assigned to 3d Massachusetts Brigade in the Northern Department. The brigade was reassigned to the main Continental Army on 27 October 1777. On 20 November 1778, the brigade was reassigned to the Highland's Department and on 12 May 1779 was re-organized to nine companies. On 1 January 1781, the regiment was reassigned to the 1st Massachusetts Brigade of the Highland's Department. On 18 June 1781, the regiment was reassigned to the New Hampshire Brigade. This brigade was reassigned from the Highland's Department to the Northern Department on 14 October 1781. The regiment was relieved from this brigade on 12 November 1781 and assigned to the Highland's Department. On 29 August 1782, the regiment was assigned to the New Hampshire Brigade in the Northern Department. It was relieved from this brigade on 26 October 1782 and assigned to the Highland's Department. The regiment was disbanded on 15 November 1783 at West Point, New York. The regiment would see action at the Battle of Saratoga and the Battle of Monmouth.

Colonel Thomas Marshall was commanding officer of the 10th Massachusetts Regiment from 6 November 1776 until 1 January 1781. Colonel Benjamin Tupper was commanding officer from 1 January 1781 until 1 January 1783.
