= 6th Massachusetts Regiment =

Nixon's Regiment 4th Continental Regiment 6th Massachusetts Regiment
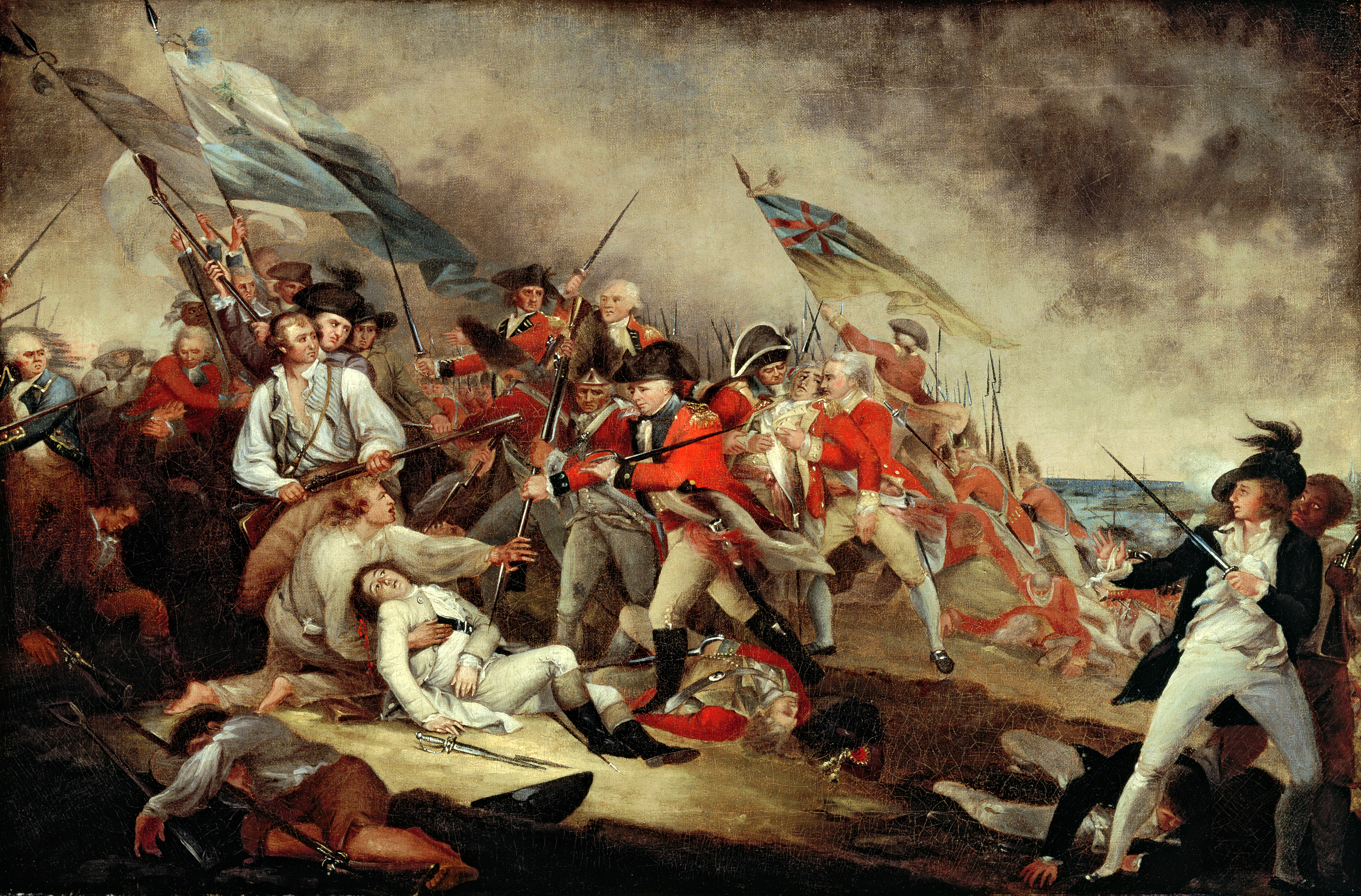
- The Battle of Bunker Hill, which the regiment fought in
- Active: 1775-1783
- Allegiance: Continental Congress
- Branch: Continental Army
- Type: Infantry
- Part of: Massachusetts Line
- Engagements: Battle of Bunker Hill; New York Campaign; Battle of Trenton; Battle of Princeton; Battle of Saratoga

Commanders
- Notable commanders: John Nixon, Thomas Nixon, Benjamin Tupper

The 6th Massachusetts Regiment also known as the 4th Continental Regiment was raised on April 23, 1775, under Colonel John Nixon outside of Boston, Massachusetts. The regiment would see action at the Battle of Bunker Hill, New York Campaign, Battle of Trenton, Battle of Princeton and the Battle of Saratoga. The regiment was furloughed June 12, 1783, at West Point, New York and disbanded on November 3, 1783.

== Bunker Hill ==
During the battle of Bunker Hill the 6th Massachusetts Regiment, under the command of Colonel John Nixon, was positioned in the redoubt on Breeds Hill near Captain Jonathan Brewer and Captain William Prescott regiments. During General William Howe's first attack on Breed's Hill, Nixon was wounded and was withdrawn from the battle. The remaining members of the regiment withdrew when the redoubt was overtaken by Howe's second attack.

== Later service ==
The 6th Massachusetts participated in the New York campaign by helping fortify Governors Island in New York Harbor in August 1776. They later fought in the Battle of Harlem Heights and the Battle of Trenton under General Nathanael Greene. The regiment reinforced General Philip Schuyler at Stillwater, New York, in July 1777. The 6th Massachusetts composed part of the main body of General Horatio Gates at the Battles of Saratoga.

Peter Salem, a freed African-American slave, served in the regiment from April 24, 1775, to December 31, 1779.

== Commanding officers ==
Colonel John Nixon - Commanded the regiment from May 19, 1775, until August 9, 1776, when he was promoted to brigadier general.

Colonel Thomas Nixon - Brother of John Nixon. Served as lieutenant colonel of the 6th Massachusetts from May 19, 1775, until he took command of the regiment on August 6, 1776, and was promoted to colonel. Retired January 1, 1781.

Lieutenant Colonel Calvin Smith - Commanded the regiment as a lieutenant colonel from January 1, 1781, to January 1, 1783.

Colonel Benjamin Tupper - Commanding officer January 1, 1783, until the unit was disbanded on June 12, 1783.

== Other officers ==
Thomas Barnes- Served as captain from January 1777 to March 1779, when he was promoted to major with the 12th Massachusetts.

Richard Buckmaster- Served as lieutenant, 2d lieutenant and captain from December 1775 until his death in November 1779.

William Buckmaster- Served as lieutenant-colonel from December 1776 until his death in November 1776.

Japhet Daniels- Served as captain from January 1777 to June 1783.

Samuel Frost- Served as sergeant-major, ensign, 1st lieutenant, captain lieutenant and captain from January 1776 to June 1783.

Peter Harwood- Served as captain and major from November 1776 until he resigned October 1780.

Benjamin Heywood- Served as lieutenant, captain from December 1775 until June 1783.

Abel Holden- Served as lieutenant and captain from December 1775 until he resigned May 1781.

John Holden- Served as captain lieutenant and captain from January 1777 until he resigned April 1780.

Moses Porter - Served as ensign from 1 January 1777 to 23 April 1779. Commanded the Light Artillery Regiment in the War of 1812.

Calvin Smith- Served as lieutenant-colonel from November 1776 to March 1779 and lieutenant-colonel commandant from January 1781 to June 1783.

John Spur- Served as captain and major from January 1777 until he retired January 1781.

Joseph Thompson- Served as captain and major from January 1776 until he was promoted to lieutenant-colonel in the 10th Massachusetts in December 1777.

William Toogood- Served as 1st lieutenant and captain from January 1776 until he resigned April 1779.

Joseph Butler- Served as a captain from January 1776 until December 31, 1776.

Jabez Lane - Served as a captain in Col. Thomas Nixon's 6th MA Reg., Nixon's Brigade at Saratoga

== See also ==
- 6th Massachusetts Regiment (Spanish American War), Unit in the Spanish American War 1898.
- Peter Salem

== References and further reading ==
- Fleming, Thomas J. The Story of Bunker Hill. New York: Collier Books, 1960.
- Carrington, Henry B. Battles of the American Revolution, 1775-1781. New York: Promontory Press, 1877 (reprint 1974).
- Heitman, Francis B. Historical Register of Officers of the Continental Army During the War of the Revolution. Baltimore: Genealogical Publishing Co., 1914 (reprint 1982).
- Collections of The New York Historical Society: Muster and Pay Rolls of the War of the Revolution, 1775-1783. Baltimore: Genealogical Publishing Co., 1914.
