= Joseph Gilman =

Joseph Gilman may refer to:

- Joseph Gilman (tackle), All-American football player at Harvard University
- Joseph Gilman (guard) (1883–1933), All-American football player at Dartmouth College and, later, president and general manager of the Boston Garden
- Joseph Gilman (1738–1806), New Hampshire State Senator and judge of the Northwest Territory
