= Israel Donalson =

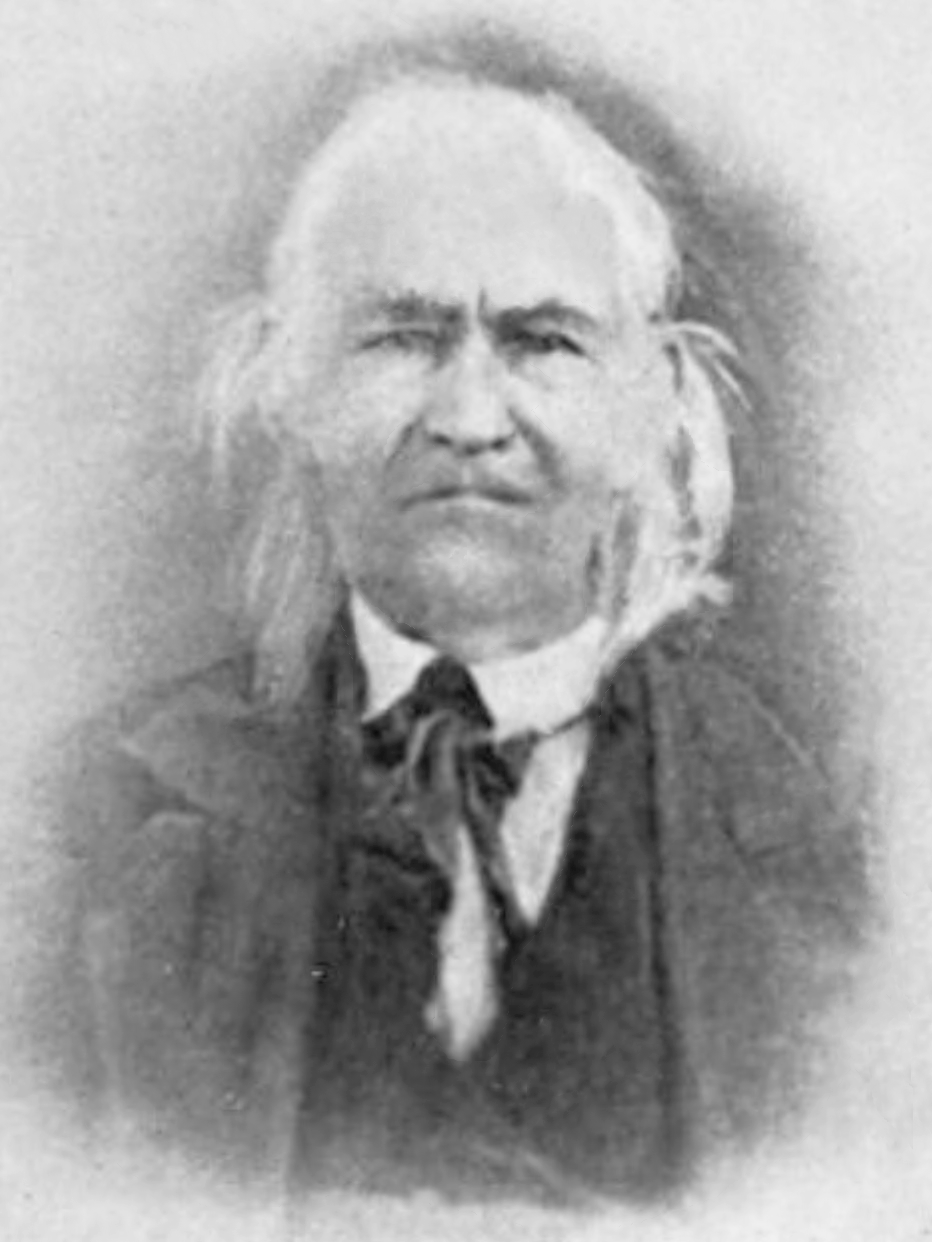
- Donalson in c. 1858–1859
- Born: February 2, 1767; Hunterdon County, New Jersey
- Died: February 9, 1860 (aged 93); Manchester, Ohio
- Resting place: Founders Cemetery

Israel Donalson (February 2, 1767 – February 9, 1860) was an early settler in the Northwest Territory and helped write the first Ohio Constitution.

Israel Donalson was born February 2, 1767, at Hunterdon County, New Jersey, and soon was moved to Cumberland County, New Jersey. In the fall of 1787, he moved to Ohio County, Virginia (now West Virginia), where he farmed, taught school, and served in the militia. In May 1790, he took a flatboat down the Ohio River to Limestone (now Maysville), Kentucky, where he taught school, and he met Nathaniel Massie. He went with Massie to Massie's Station (now Manchester, Ohio) Northwest Territory early in 1791 to help survey lands in the Virginia Military District, where he was captured by Native Americans, and held for a number of days before a harrowing escaping.

Donalson took up teaching in Manchester, and also some surveying, which he had studied in the East, and continued for much of his life. He was in Mad Anthony Wayne's Campaign in 1794 in the Northwest Indian War. He married Miss Annie Pennyweight on November 15, 1798, and traveled to Kentucky for that purpose, as there was no authority to do it in that part of the territory at that time.

In 1802, Donalson was elected as one of three Adams County delegates, along with Joseph Darlinton and Thomas Kirker, to the first Constitutional Convention of Ohio which met November 1–29, 1802. He voted 'no' on allowing the unpopular Governor of the Territory, Arthur St. Clair, to address the Convention, which passed 19-14, 'no' on submitting the Constitution to popular referendum, which failed 27-7, 'no' on allowing slavery, which failed 2-31, 'no' on allowing a poll tax or religious test for office, and 'no' on allowing Blacks to vote.

Donalson had no more participation in state government. He was appointed postmaster of Manchester in 1801 and held office to September 27, 1813. In 1808, he started a carding mill in Manchester. He enlisted for the War of 1812. He was active in the Presbyterian Church and lived the rest of his life in Manchester.

In 1848, he wrote to his fellow Convention delegate Judge Cutler, and noted that since his captivity among the Indians, "my life has been one of turmoil", and that he had met with pecuniary losses, but is thankful to God who sustained him.

When Judge Cutler died on July 8, 1853, Donalson was left as the last survivor of the Convention. He died February 9, 1860, age 93. Politically, he was a Democrat and later a Whig.

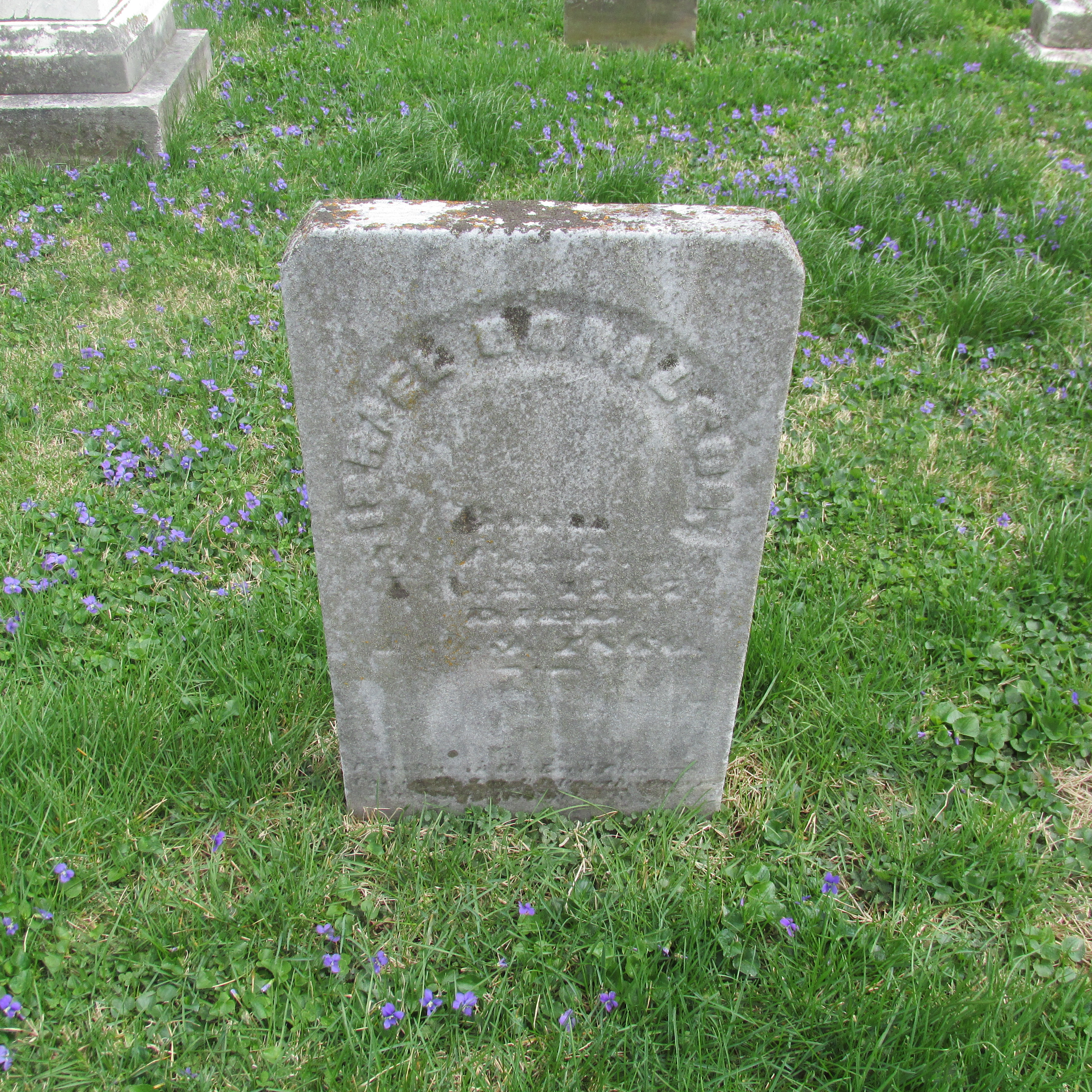
Grave of Israel Donalson at Founders Cemetery in Manchester, Ohio.

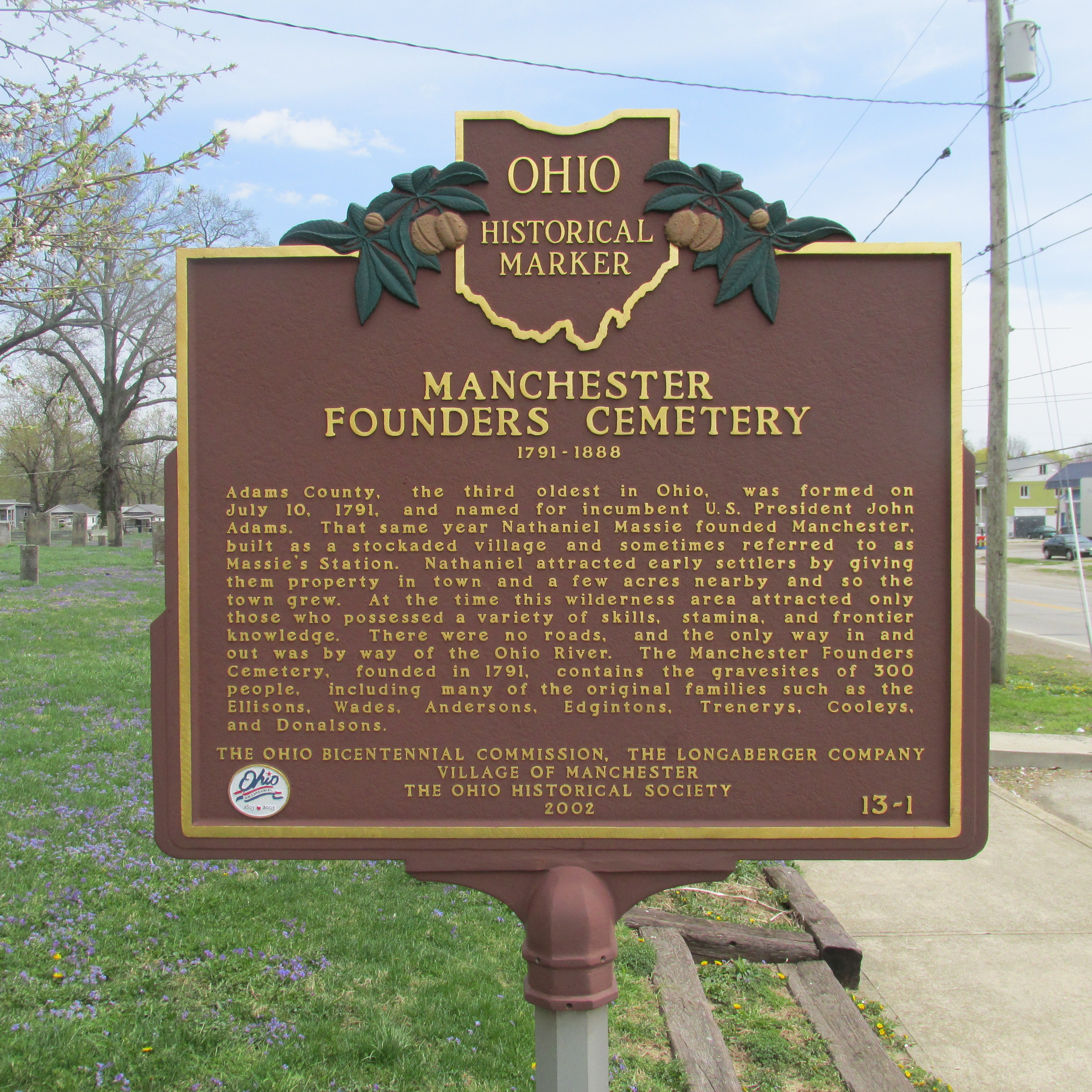
Ohio Historical Marker at Founders Cemetery.

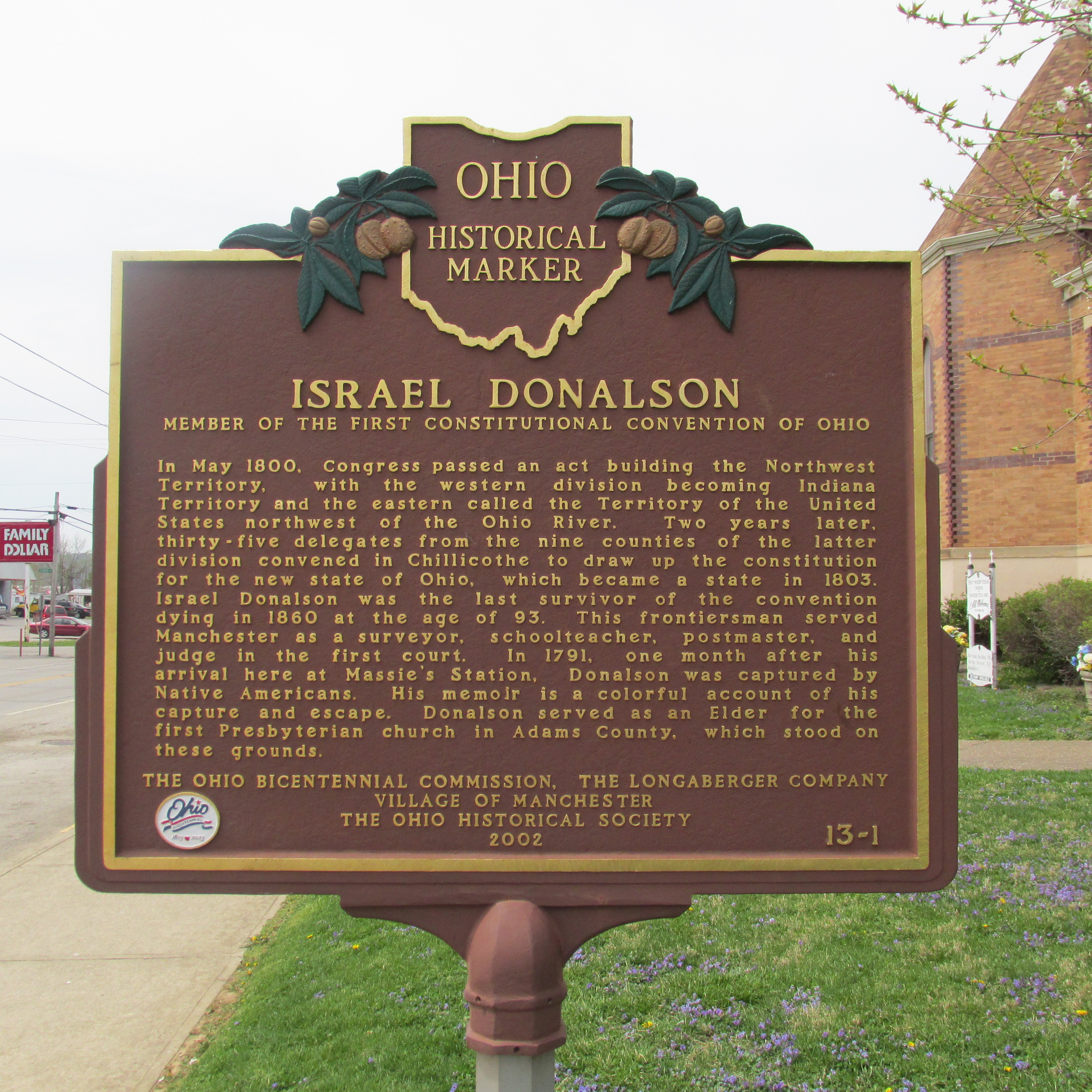
Ohio Historical Marker at Founders Cemetery.
