= Philip Gatch =

American Methodist minister

Personal details
- Born: March 2, 1751 Baltimore County, Maryland
- Died: December 28, 1834 (aged 83) Milford, Ohio
- Spouse: Elizabeth Smith

Philip Gatch (1751–1834) was an early American Methodist minister involved in the formation of the Methodist Episcopal Church. He was born in Baltimore County, Maryland, on March 2, 1751, the son of a German father and a Burgundian mother. Brought up in a strict Anglican home, Gatch was taught to read at an early age and in his early teenage years refused to attend church. However, after the death of his sister and uncle, he fell into a depression in which he was "alarmed by dreams, by sickness, and by various other means, which were sent by God, in his mercy, for my good." Upon attending a revival meeting held by a Methodist minister named Nathan Perigau in January 1772, Gatch grew increasingly attracted to the small group of local Methodists, despite his father's displeasure. He was eventually converted under the preaching of Robert Strawbridge and began his own preaching career at the age of twenty-two in 1773.

Gatch played an important role in the transitional years of American Methodism as it broke away from its British connection during the late eighteenth century. He attended the Annual Conference of 1777 when increased responsibility was given to American-born preachers over the Methodist work in the States, a significant transition away from British oversight. Two years later he played a pivotal leadership role in the decision of the Methodists in the south to set up a presbytery of four ministers who would ordain one another so that they could then, in turn, ordain others to administer the sacraments. During the Revolutionary War, Methodist ministers were subject to hostility, since their leaders were English. Gatch escaped imprisonment, but "he was, perhaps, the subject of as much, or more, persecution for his Master's sake than any of his contemporaries."

During his years of ministry, Gatch travelled throughout New Jersey, Pennsylvania, and Maryland before he stopped itinerating in 1778 due to poor health. He married Elizabeth Smith in 1778, and settled down in Powhatan County, Virginia, and later moved to Ohio, where he was sold land near the town of Milford. While in Ohio, Gatch helped to establish the Methodist Episcopal Church's presence there, but also became a surveyor, land agent, justice of the peace, associate judge in Clermont County, Ohio, and a member of the convention that drafted the Constitution of Ohio. At the convention he was a strong advocate for the rights of Black people. He voted to allow non-white men to vote, and to allow them to hold office and testify in court against a white man. Thomas Scott, secretary of the convention, wrote in 1853 of Rev. Gatch: "He was constantly treated with deference and respect, and regarded by the members and officers of the convention, and others, as an honest, pious, plain, sensible, useful member of the convention. His general deportment was grave, yet courteous, affable, and friendly. ... He occupied an elevated standing in my own estimation, and I take great pleasure in bearing this testimony of his intrinsic worth."

Motivated by his religious convictions, Gatch was an outspoken critic of slavery. After marrying, he chose to manumit the slaves he had inherited by marriage. His deed of emancipation read "Know all men by these presents, that I, Philip Gatch, of Powhatan County, Va., do believe that all men are by nature equally free; and from a clear conviction of the injustice of depriving my fellow-creatures of their natural rights, do hereby emancipate and set free all the following persons." He also joined the Humane Society of Richmond for the Abolition of the Slave Trade. His distaste for slavery likely explains his choice to move north in his latter years in life. For he recorded that he was reluctant "to die [in Virginia] and leave my offspring in a land of Slavery," and so he moved from Virginia to Ohio with his extended family in 1798, happy to cross the Ohio River, "which separates between slavery and freedom."

Gatch died from influenza on December 28, 1834, in his home.
