= Ohio Constitutional Convention (1802) =

American state's constitutional convention

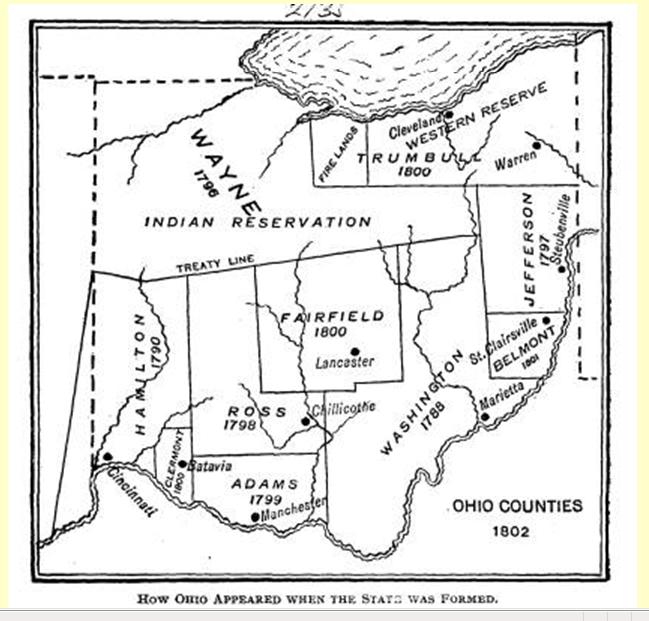
Ohio counties in 1802

The Enabling Act of 1802 was passed on April 30, 1802, by the Seventh Congress of the United States. This act authorized the residents of the eastern portion of the Northwest Territory to form the state of Ohio and join the U.S. on an equal footing with the other states. In doing so it also established the precedent and procedures for creation of future states in the western territories.

Ohio was the first state to be created out of the Northwest Territories, as established by the Northwest Ordinance in 1787 in an act of the Continental Congress under the Articles of Confederation. The Northwest Ordinance laid out the conditions for the creation of a state from a territory. By the census of 1800, the easternmost part of the Northwest Territories had reached a population of 45,365 and it was believed it would reach the required 60,000 by 1803, when statehood would be achieved. The Enabling Act of 1802 set forth the legal mechanisms and authorized the people of Ohio to begin this process.

Elections of delegates were held in the various counties of the Eastern District of the Northwest Territory in 1802, and the delegates met from November 1 to November 29, 1802, to choose a name for the state and draft a state constitution.

== List of delegates ==
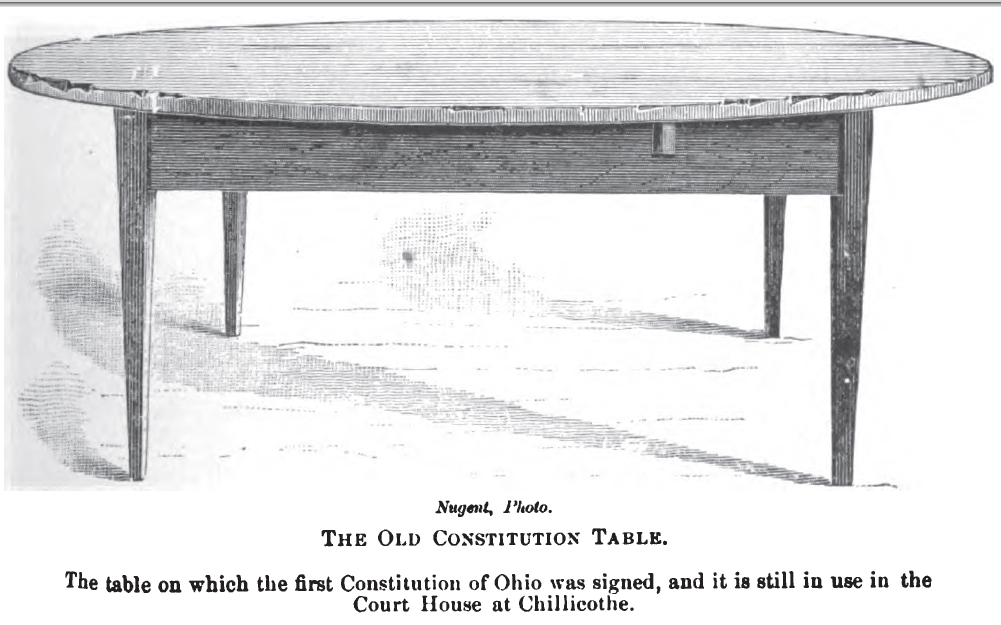

Those who ratified the constitution November 29, 1802:

- Edward Tiffin, President and delegate of Ross County
- Adams County
  - Joseph Darlinton • Israel Donalson • Thomas Kirker
- Belmont County
  - James Caldwell • Elijah Woods
- Clermont County
  - Philip Gatch • James Sargent
- Fairfield County
  - Henry Abrams • Emanuel Carpenter
- Hamilton County
  - John W. Browne • Charles Willing Byrd • Francis Dunlavy • William Goforth
  - John Kitchel • Jeremiah Morrow • John Paul • John Reily
  - John Smith • John Wilson
- Jefferson County
  - Rudolph Bair • George Humphrey • John Milligan • Nathan Updegraff
  - Bezaleel Wells
- Ross County
  - Michael Baldwin • James Grubb • Nathaniel Massie • Thomas Worthington
- Trumbull County
  - David Abbot • Samuel Huntington
- Washington County
  - Ephraim Cutler • Benjamin Ives Gilman • John McIntire • Rufus Putnam

== Note ==
- Wayne County was left out of participating by the Congress. This was because it was populated by Federalists who would oppose statehood, while the apportionment was by the opposing party, according to one author.
