= Joseph Darlinton =

American politician

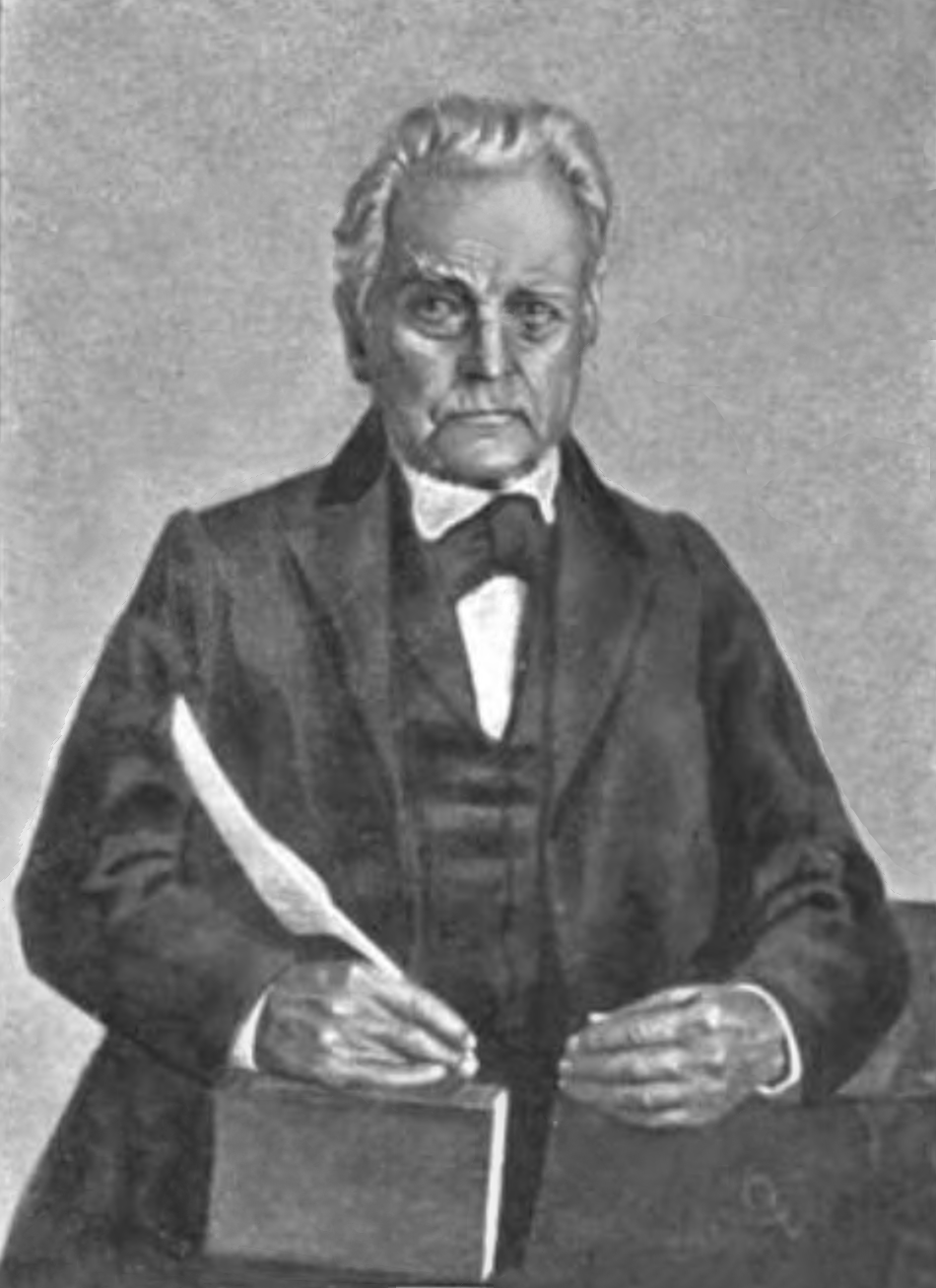

Member of the Ohio Senate from the Adams County district
- In office March 1, 1803 – December 4, 1803
- Preceded by: new district
- Succeeded by: Thomas Kirker

Personal details
- Born: July 19, 1765 Winchester, Virginia
- Died: August 2, 1851 (aged 86) West Union, Ohio

Joseph Darlinton (July 19, 1765 – August 2, 1851) was an American politician in the U.S. state of Ohio and in the Northwest Territory prior to Ohio statehood. Darlinton represented Adams County as a member of the Northwest Territory House of Representatives and the Ohio Senate. Darlinton also served as a delegate to the convention that drafted the first state constitution for Ohio.

Joseph Darlinton was born July 19, 1765, near Winchester, Virginia, on the 400 acre plantation of his father, Meredith Darlinton. As a young man, he traveled extensively, and spent extravagantly. On March 18, 1790, he married the rich heiress Sarah Wilson of Romney, Virginia (now West Virginia), who had also been courted by Albert Gallatin. They lived in Romney for a few months, until moving to a farm she owned in Fayette County, Pennsylvania. There, two sons were born, the couple joined the Presbyterian Church, and Darlinton was elected County Commissioner.

Life in Pennsylvania depressed them, so they took a boat down the Ohio River to Limestone (now Maysville), Kentucky, landing there November 14, 1794. He became a ferryman, but tired of that, and brought land across the river in the Northwest Territory, and moved there in the spring of 1797. When Adams County was formed by Governor St. Clair, July 10, 1797, St. Clair named Darlinton Judge of Probate. In 1798, he was appointed one of the first County Commissioners. That year he was also made an elder of the Presbyterian Church, which he remained for the rest of his life.

Darlinton was elected an Adams County Representative to the Northwest Territory House of Representatives, which met off and on in three sessions between September 1799 and January 1802. In 1802, Darlinton was elected as one of three Adams County delegates, along with Israel Donalson and Thomas Kirker, to the first Constitutional Convention of Ohio which met November 1–29, 1802. He voted 'no' on allowing the unpopular Governor of the Territory, Arthur St. Clair, to address the Convention, which passed 19–14, 'no' on submitting the Constitution to popular referendum, which failed 27–7, 'no' on allowing slavery, which failed 2–31, 'no' on allowing a poll tax or religious test for office, and 'yes' on allowing Blacks to vote.

He ran for the Ohio State Senate for the first general assembly. John Beasley won, but Darlinton contested the election and was seated. In 1803, he relocated to West Union, Ohio, where he lived the remainder of his years. He was elected 1803 by the legislature as associate judge of the court of common pleas, and resigned in 1804. He was a Trustee of Ohio University from 1804 to 1815. In 1804 he was commissioned a lieutenant colonel of the Ohio Militia, and became General Darlinton March 17, 1806, when he was named a brigadier general. He was appointed clerk of the court of common pleas in Adams County August 3, 1802, and was re-appointed up till August 1847. He served as recorder of Adams County 1803–1810 and 1813–1834. On February 20, 1810, he was appointed a member of the commission to locate the capital of the state. In later years he was a Whig.

He owned the land, and laid out the town of Winchester, Ohio. He named it for Winchester, Virginia, where he grew up, but never re-visited.

He eventually had eight children.

Joseph Darlinton died August 2, 1851, in an epidemic of Cholera, which he had dreaded all his life.
