= Benjamin Ives Gilman (pioneer) =

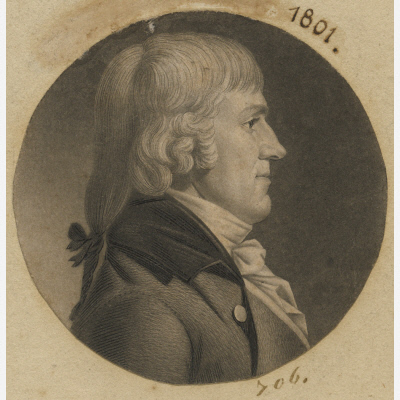

Delegate to the 1802 Ohio Constitutional Convention from Washington County
- In office November 1, 1802 – November 29, 1802 Serving with Ephraim Cutler; John McIntire; Rufus Putnam

Personal details
- Born: July 29, 1766 Exeter, New Hampshire
- Died: October 13, 1833 (aged 67) Alton, Illinois
- Party: Federalist
- Spouse: Hannah Robbins
- Children: Winthrop Sargent Gilman, eight others
- Education: Phillips Exeter Academy

Benjamin Ives Gilman (29 July 1766 – 13 October 1833) was a pioneer of the U.S. state of Ohio. He was a shipbuilder on the Ohio River and an extensive landholder. He was a delegate to the convention that wrote a constitution for the new state.

== Youth ==
Gilman was the son of Joseph Gilman and Rebecca (Ives) Gilman, and was born July 29, 1766, at Exeter, New Hampshire. He graduated from Phillips Exeter Academy. When the Ohio Company of Associates was formed, he purchased one share personally, and two in partnership. He moved to Marietta, Northwest Territory, with his parents in 1789.

== Life in Northwest ==
Gilman returned to the East, and married Hannah Robbins of Plymouth, Massachusetts, at that place in February 1790, and they moved to Marietta. The couple had nine children born between 1790 and 1808, including Winthrop Sargent Gilman.

Gilman opened a store in Fort Harmar in 1792, and was clerk of courts for Washington County from 1795 to 1803. In 1802, Gilman was elected as a Federalist delegate to the convention to write a constitution for the new state of Ohio. He voted at the convention against slavery and for civil rights and suffrage of black people.

In 1801, Gilman began a shipbuilding business. His ships would sail down the Ohio River and Mississippi River, and thence to ports on the Atlantic Ocean. This business thrived until the Embargo Act of 1807 destroyed trade. Gilman also had extensive landholdings in Ohio. In 1810, he owned 22,128 acres (8,955 ha), sixth most in the state.

== Return east ==
The War of 1812 diminished the value of lands in Ohio, and the ability of buyers and tenants to make payments. In 1813, Gilman moved back east to Philadelphia, Pennsylvania. He was deeply indebted to his relative Nicholas Gilman at the time. He was a partner in the Philadelphia house of Gilman and Ammidon, and his business was successful there. Gilman was the only one of 35 delegates to the constitutional convention to return to live in the East.

Two of Gilman's sons lived in Alton, Illinois. He visited there in 1833, and died from a fever at that place on October 13 of that year.

== Notes ==
- Gillman, Alexander William (1895). Searches into the history of the Gillman or Gilman family: including the ... London: Elliot Stock.
- Gilman, Arthur (1869). The Gilman family traced in the line of Hon. John Gilman of Exeter, N.H. with an account of many other Gilmans in England and America. Albany: J. Munsell.
- Phillips Exeter Academy (1903). General catalogue of officers and students of Phillips Exeter Academy, 1783-1903. Exeter NH: The News-Leader Press. p. 1. "ives."
- Hulbert, Archer Butler, ed. (1917). The Records of the Original Proceedings of the Ohio Company. Marietta College Historical Collections. Vol. 2. Marietta Historical Commission.
- Milligan, Fred J. (2003). Ohio's Founding Fathers. Lincoln, Nebraska: iUniverse. pp. 21–23. ISBN 0595750397. OCLC 53472872.
- Noyes, Mrs. Charles P (1919). A family history in letters and documents, 1667-1837: concerning the forefathers of Winthrop Sargent Gilman and his wife Abia Swift Lippincott. Vol. 1. St Paul, Minn: privately printed.
- "First Constitutional Convention, Convened November 1, 1802". Ohio Archaeological and Historical Publications. V: 80–132. 1896.
- Saltow, Lee. "Inequality Amidst Abundance: Land Ownership in Early Nineteenth Century Ohio". Ohio History. 88: 133–151. Archived from the original on April 3, 2015.
