= Joseph W. White =

American politician

Joseph Worthington White
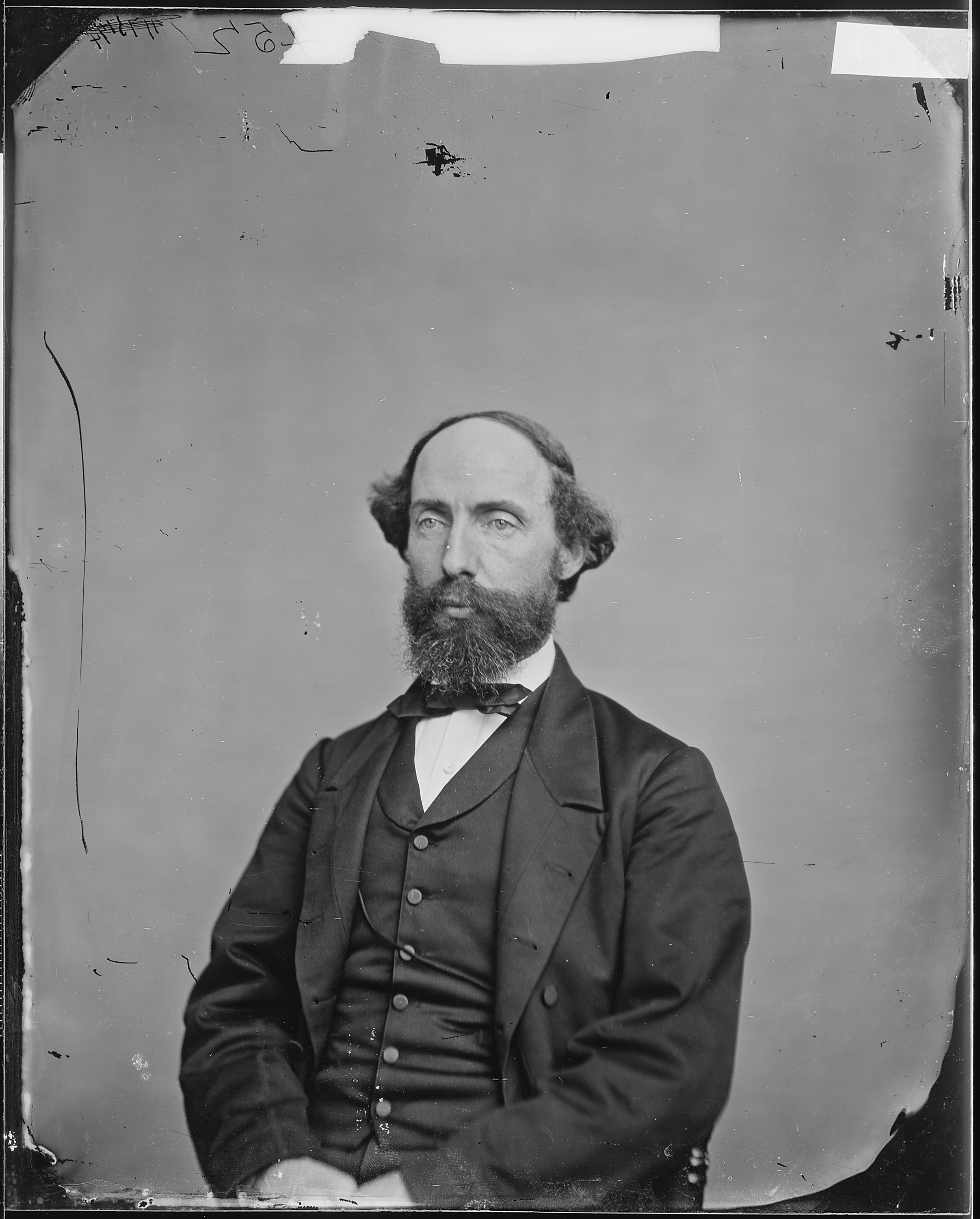

Member of the U.S. House of Representatives from Ohio's 16th district
- In office March 4, 1863 – March 4, 1865
- Preceded by: William P. Cutler
- Succeeded by: John Bingham

Personal details
- Born: October 2, 1822 Cambridge, Ohio
- Died: August 6, 1892 (aged 69) Cambridge, Ohio
- Resting place: South Cemetery
- Party: Democratic
- Education: Cambridge Academy

Joseph Worthington White (October 2, 1822 – August 6, 1892) was an American lawyer and politician who served one term as a U.S. representative from Ohio from 1863 to 1865.

== Biography ==
Born in Cambridge, Ohio, White attended the common schools and Cambridge Academy. He engaged in mercantile pursuits. He studied law. He was admitted to the bar in 1844, and commenced practice in Cambridge. He served as prosecuting attorney of Guernsey County 1845-1847. He served as mayor of Cambridge. He served as delegate to the 1860 Democratic National Convention.

=== Congress ===
White was elected as a Democrat to the Thirty-eighth Congress (March 4, 1863 – March 4, 1865). He was an unsuccessful for reelection in 1864 to the Thirty-ninth Congress.

=== Later career and death ===
He resumed the practice of law. He died in Cambridge, Ohio, August 6, 1892. He was interred in the South Cemetery.

== Sources ==
- United States Congress. "Joseph W. White (id: W000384)". Biographical Directory of the United States Congress.

U.S. House of Representatives
Preceded by William P. Cutler	Member of the U.S. House of Representatives from Ohio's 15th congressional district 1863-1865	Succeeded by John Bingham
