= William P. Cutler =

U.S. Representative from Ohio

William Parker Cutler
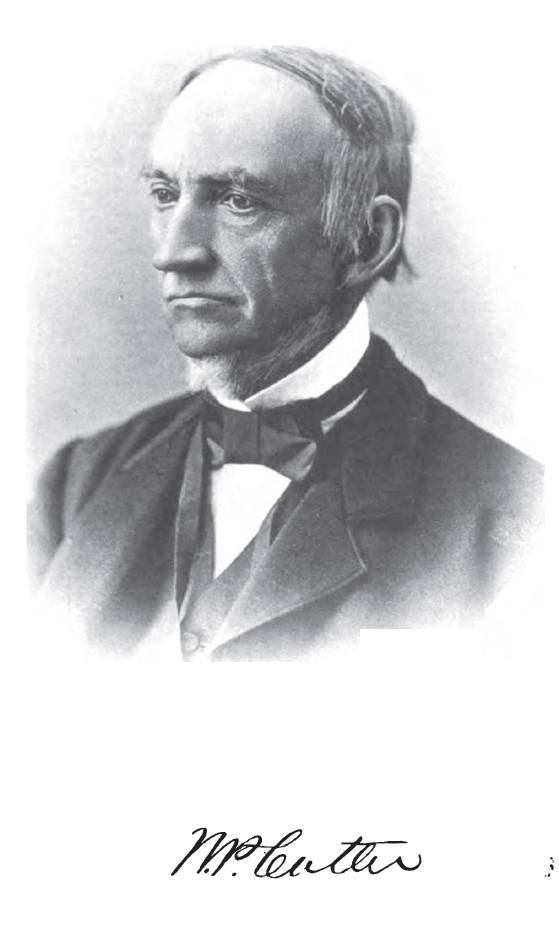

Member of the U.S. House of Representatives from Ohio's 16th district
- In office March 4, 1861 – March 3, 1863
- Preceded by: Cydnor B. Tompkins
- Succeeded by: Joseph W. White

Member of the Ohio House of Representatives
- In office 1844-1847

Personal details
- Born: July 12, 1812 Warren Township, Washington County, Ohio, US
- Died: April 11, 1889 (aged 76) Marietta, Ohio, US
- Resting place: Oak Grove Cemetery
- Party: Whig; Republican
- Spouse: Elizabeth W. Voris
- Children: six
- Education: Ohio University

William Parker Cutler (July 12, 1812 – April 11, 1889) was an American railroad executive and politician who served as a U.S. representative from Ohio for one term from 1861 to 1863.

== Early life and education ==
William Cutler, the youngest son of Ephraim Cutler and Sally Parker Cutler, and grandson of Manasseh Cutler, was born July 12, 1812, at the Cutler homestead in Warren Township, Washington County, Ohio. In 1829, he entered Ohio University at Athens. Ill-health forced him to drop out after his junior year. He farmed with his father, and continued ill health for several years prevented any professional aspirations.

== Political career ==
In 1840, he campaigned for Whig nominee William Henry Harrison, and was nominated for the Ohio House of Representatives in 1842, but lost to George M. Woodbridge. In 1844, in his second try, he was elected by a large majority to the House. He was re-elected in 1845. In 1846, he was elected again, and was chosen by the Whig caucus as Speaker of the House.

After the close of the 1846-1847 session, Cutler's colleague, Hon. E. G. Squier wrote to a Cincinnati newspaper:

Let us glance around the hall of the lower house - not to admire its architectural wonders - and see if we can detect the 'men of mark.' Our attention first rests upon the speaker's chair. Its occupant is tall and swarthy, perhaps we should say sallow man, dressed with the utmost plainness, and with a carelessness which might be deemed affection by any other person. He stoops slightly - is it from a sense of being tall and without elegance? No. Although modest and retiring to a fault, he never bestows a though on outward appearance., nor calculates outward impression.
Mr. Cutler is a gentleman of liberal education, and his acquirements are rich and varied. Yet he has always been contented in the quiet of his farm; and in that retirement, reflection and thought have exercised their chastening and refining influences. When, therefore Mr. Cutler was called to the capitol, he came here with a healthy well balanced intellect, and nothing but a modesty almost painful in its excess prevented him from at once assuming the lead of his party. ... As soon as the result of the late state canvas was ascertained, all eyes turned to him as the man best fitted to preside over the House to which he was elected to the Speakership. No other selection could possibly prove so satisfactory. He possesses the unbounded respect and esteem of all, and the utmost confidence is reposed in his impartiality...

— E. G. Squier, 1847

In 1848, Cutler received support for Governor of Ohio, but the Whigs decided on a Northern Ohio candidate, and chose Seabury Ford, who ended up winning election.

Cutler was a trustee of Ohio University 1849–1853.

Cutler was married in 1849 to Elizabeth W. Voris of Warren Township, Washington County, Ohio. She, along with one daughter survived him. Three sons and two daughters died in early childhood.

=== First run for Congress ===
Later that year, he was nominated for congressman from the 13th district, composed of Washington, Morgan and Perry Counties. He lost to Democrat William A. Whittlesey.

In 1849, Cutler was elected to represent Washington County at the constitutional convention that re-wrote the constitution in 1850. While at the convention in Columbus, Ohio, the Whig State Convention was held May 6 and 7, 1850. Several members encouraged Cutler to be candidate for Governor. He declined, and William Johnston was nominated and lost the general election.

== Railroad career ==
In the Legislature in 1845, Cutler procured a charter for the Belpre and Cincinnati Railroad. He was elected a director of the company at its organization in August 1847. He travelled to Baltimore in 1849 to persuade the Baltimore and Ohio Railroad (B&O) to connect to their line. The B&O decided on a different route.

At the meeting of the Belpre and Cincinnati in August 1850, Cutler was chosen president. Surveys began at once, and construction began in 1851. Large investment from the Pennsylvania Railroad and the city of Wheeling were made contingent on a change of name of the company. On August 12, 1851, the board voted to change the name to the Marietta and Cincinnati Railroad. A line to Wheeling was planned for completion by December 1, 1854. Up to 6000 men worked at construction, and progress continued until the Crimean War broke out, securities sales ceased, and the workmen were laid off. Cutler's health failed, and he resigned as president in September 1854, but continued as a director.

After several delays, a line from Athens to Marietta was opened April 9, 1857, just in time for the economy to collapse in the Panic of 1857. Cutler was elected vice-president in 1857, and president in May 1858. He continued until fall 1859, when the company was able to financially re-organize.

Trustee of Marietta College 1845–1889.

== Congress ==
Cutler was elected as a Republican to the Thirty-seventh Congress (March 4, 1861 – March 3, 1863). He was an unsuccessful candidate for reelection in 1862 to the Thirty-eighth Congress. He resumed agricultural pursuits and also engaged in railroad building.

== Death ==
He died in Marietta, Ohio, April 11, 1889. He was interred in Oak Grove Cemetery.

== See also ==
- United States House of Representatives elections in Ohio, 1860
- United States House of Representatives elections in Ohio, 1862

== Notes ==
U.S. House of Representatives
Preceded by Cydnor B. Tompkins	United States Representative from Ohio's 16th congressional district 1861–1863	Succeeded by Joseph W. White
Ohio House of Representatives
Preceded by William Glines; John C. Clark	Representative from Washington County; 1844-1847	Succeeded by George W. Barker
Preceded by Elias F. Drake	Speaker of the House; 1846-1847	Succeeded by Joseph S. Hawkins
