= John McIntire (pioneer) =

American pioneer (1759–1815)

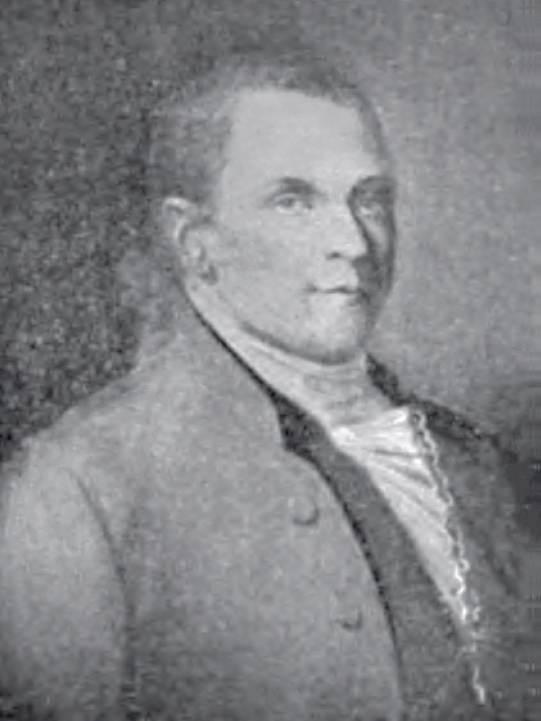

Personal details
- Born: October 15, 1759 Alexandria, Virginia
- Died: July 29, 1815 (aged 55) Zanesville, Ohio
- Resting place: Pioneer Hill Cemetery, Zanesville

John McIntire (October 15, 1759 – July 29, 1815) was the founder of the city of Zanesville, Ohio.

McIntire was born in Alexandria, Virginia. He married Sarah Zane, the daughter of Colonel Ebenezer Zane, in December 1789. McIntire founded Zanesville in 1797 on land deeded by Colonel Zane.

One family history claims that in 1802 while exiled from France, Louis Philippe, who later became King of France, stayed with the McIntires and was very impressed by them. United States Ambassador to France Lewis Cass, under pseudonym "An American", wrote France: its King, Court and Government in 1840. He had this to say of the King's tour through the Northwest:

At Zanesville the party found the comfortable cabin of Mr. M'Intire, whose name has been preserved in the King's memory, and whose house was a favorite place of rest and refreshment for all the travellers who at this early period were compelled to traverse that part of the country. And if these pages should chance to meet the eyes of any of those who, like the writer, have passed many a pleasant hour under the roof of this uneducated, but truly worthy and respectable man, he trusts they will unite in this tribute to his memory.

— Lewis Cass, 1840

== Parents ==
Nothing certain is known of McIntire's background prior to his arrival in Muskingum County, Ohio. A family history written by Isaac McIntire in 1902 claims that his parents were John McIntire of Scotland, Ireland, and Charlotte Hedge, an English woman. Currently this claim has not been proven.

== Politics ==
In 1802, Zanesville was still located in Washington County, and McIntire was elected as one of four Washington County delegates, along with Ephraim Cutler, Benjamin Ives Gilman and Rufus Putnam, to the first Constitutional Convention of Ohio which met November 1–29, 1802.

== Epitaph ==
A description of the life John McIntire appears on his gravestone. The epitaph is as follows:

"Sacred to the memory of John McIntire, who departed this life July 29, 1815 aged 56 years. He was born at Alexandria, VA, laid out the town of Zanesville in 1800, of which he was the patron and father. He was a member of the convention which formed the constitution of Ohio. A kind husband, an obliging neighbor, punctual in his engagements, of liberal mind and benevolent disposition, his death was sincerely lamented."

== Namesake ==
McIntire's memory lives on in the town he founded. Places around Zanesville named for him include: John McIntire Public Library, McIntire Terrace, John McIntire Elementary School, and McIntire Avenue.
