= Constitution, Ohio =

Unincorporated community in Washington County, Ohio

Coordinates: 39°20′53″N 81°33′16″W

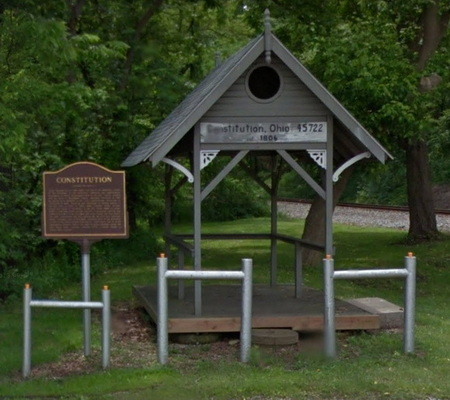
State marker and shelter at Constitution, Ohio

Constitution is an unincorporated community in Washington County, in the U.S. state of Ohio.

== History ==
A post office called Constitution was established in 1842, and remained in operation until 1978. The community's name commemorates the contribution a local settler, Ephraim Cutler, made to outlaw slavery in the Constitution of Ohio.
