= James Grubb =

Delegate to 1802 Ohio Constitutional Convention from Ross County
- In office November 1, 1802 – November 29, 1802 Serving with Michael Baldwin; Nathaniel Massie; Edward Tiffin; Thomas Worthington

Personal details
- Born: 1771; Little Britain, Pennsylvania
- Died: January 30, 1806; Chillicothe, Ohio
- Political party: Democratic-Republican

James Grubb (1771-1806) was a delegate to the convention that wrote the first constitution for the U.S. state of Ohio in 1802. He was a Democratic-Republican, who opposed allowing slavery in the new state.

== Biography ==
James Grubb was born in 1771 at Little Britain in Lancaster County, Pennsylvania. His great grandfather had emigrated from England about a century before, and his father was a veteran of the French and Indian War.

Grubb settled in Ross County in the Northwest Territory, and was named a Justice of the Peace in 1799 by Governor Arthur St. Clair. He was prominent among those Democratic-Republicans who pushed for statehood and for the removal of St. Clair.

In 1802, elections were held in each county of the territory that would become Ohio for delegates to a constitutional convention to write a constitution for the new state, which would be submitted to the US Congress. Grubb ran for a seat on this commission, and submitted a letter to the Chillicothe newspaper on September 6, 1802, which stated: "As to the introduction of slavery, I must confess that I am not so great a Federalist or Aristocrat as to wish its admission. Such a pernicious scheme ought to be guarded against in a particular manner, as I conceive it bad policy and the principle cannot be advocated by any person of humane or republican sentiments."

Grubb won election to the convention, which met from November 1 to 29, 1802. At the convention he voted against allowing slavery, but opposed equal civil rights for black men.

Grubb ran for the Ohio House of Representatives in January and October 1803, but lost both times. At the time he died, he lived in the village of Westfall, which was then in Ross County, but is now in Wayne Township, Pickaway County, Ohio.

Grubb died at Chillicothe on January 30, 1806, after a short illness. He never married.
