= John Bingham =

American politician (1815–1900)

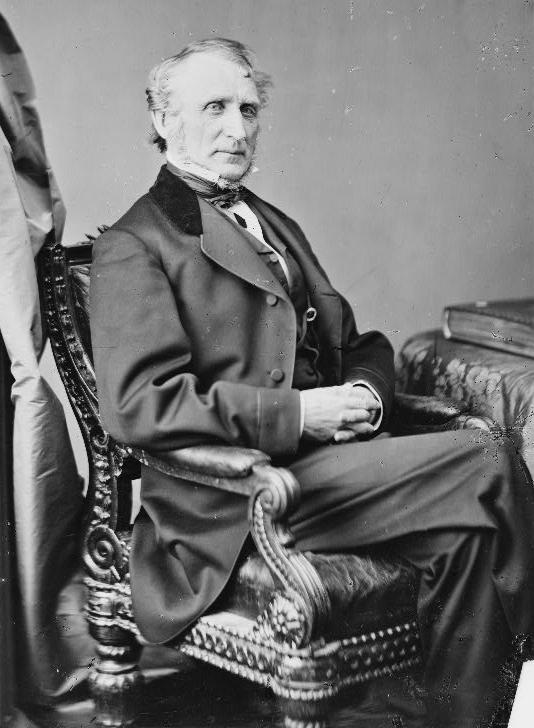
- Bingham, 1860–1875

7th United States Ambassador to Japan
- In office October 7, 1873 – July 2, 1885
- President: Ulysses Grant; Rutherford B. Hayes; James A. Garfield; Chester A. Arthur; Grover Cleveland
- Preceded by: Charles E. DeLong
- Succeeded by: Richard B. Hubbard

Member of the U.S. House of Representatives from Ohio
- In office March 4, 1865 – March 3, 1873
- Preceded by: Joseph Worthington White
- Succeeded by: Lorenzo Danford
- Constituency: 16th district
- In office March 4, 1855 – March 3, 1863
- Preceded by: Andrew Stuart
- Succeeded by: District abolished until 1883
- Constituency: 21st district

Personal details
- Born: John Armor Bingham; January 21, 1815 Mercer, Pennsylvania, U.S.
- Died: March 19, 1900 (aged 85) Cadiz, Ohio, U.S.
- Party: Republican
- Spouse: Amanda Bingham
- Profession: Politician, lawyer, judge
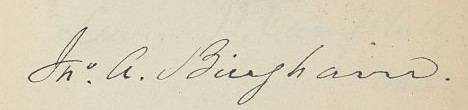
- Signature

John Armor Bingham (January 21, 1815 – March 19, 1900) was an American politician who served as a Republican representative from Ohio and as the United States ambassador to Japan. In his time as a congressman, Bingham served as both assistant Judge Advocate General in the trial of the Abraham Lincoln assassination and a House manager (prosecutor) in the impeachment trial of U.S. President Andrew Johnson. He was also the principal framer of the Fourteenth Amendment to the United States Constitution.

== Early life and education ==
Born in Mercer County, Pennsylvania, where his carpenter and bricklayer father Hugh had moved after service in the War of 1812, Bingham attended local public schools. After his mother's death in 1827, his father remarried. John moved west to Ohio to live with his merchant uncle Thomas after clashing with his new stepmother. He apprenticed as a printer for two years, helping to publish the Luminary, an anti-Masonic newspaper. He then returned to Pennsylvania to study at Mercer College and then studied law at Franklin College in New Athens, Harrison County, Ohio. There, Bingham befriended former slave Titus Basfield, who became the first African-American to graduate from college in Ohio. They continued to correspond for many years.

Hugh and Thomas Bingham were longtime abolitionists who were both active in local politics. They initially allied with the Anti-Masonic Party, led in Pennsylvania by Governor Joseph Ritner and state representative Thaddeus Stevens. Hugh became clerk of the Mercer County court and later a perennial Whig candidate in the county known for opposing war with Mexico. Matthew Simpson, Bingham's longtime friend since childhood, became a bishop in the Methodist Episcopal Church and urged President Lincoln to issue the Emancipation Proclamation. Following Lincoln's assassination, Simpson delivered a prayer at the White House and a funeral oration at the interment ceremony in Springfield, Illinois.

== Early legal career ==
After graduation, Bingham returned to Mercer, Pennsylvania, to read law with John James Pearson and William Stewart, and he was admitted to the Pennsylvania bar on March 25, 1840, and the Ohio bar by year's end. Bingham then returned to Cadiz, Ohio, to begin his legal and political career. An active Whig, Bingham campaigned for President William Henry Harrison. His uncle, Thomas, a prominent Presbyterian in the area, had served as associate judge in the Harrison County Court of Common Pleas from 1825 to 1839. The young lawyer's practice extended to Tuscarawas County, Ohio, and its seat, New Philadelphia. In 1846, Bingham won his first election as district attorney for Tuscarawas County, serving from 1846 to 1849.

== Early political career ==
Bingham's political activity continued despite the Whig Party's decline. Campaigning as candidate of the Anti-Nebraska movement, he was elected to the 34th Congress, representing the 21st congressional district. In Washington, D.C., he roomed at the same boarding house as did fellow Ohio representative Joshua Giddings, a prominent abolitionist whom Bingham admired. Voters reelected Bingham to the 35th, 36th and 37th Congresses as a Republican. However, the district was one of two Ohio districts eliminated in the redistricting following the census of 1860. Bingham thus ran for reelection in what became the 16th district. Known for his abolitionist views, he lost to Democratic peace candidate Joseph W. White, and thus failed to return for the 38th Congress, in part because Union soldiers (mostly Republican-leaning) who were away from home fighting in the war were not allowed to vote by mail in Ohio. Nonetheless, the House of Representatives appointed Bingham as one of the managers of impeachment proceedings against West Hughes Humphreys.

During the Civil War, Bingham strongly supported the Union and became known as a Radical Republican. President Abraham Lincoln appointed him Judge Advocate of the Union Army with the rank of major during his hiatus from Congress, and Bingham briefly became solicitor of the United States Court of Claims in 1865. Bingham's judge advocate service was exceptional in the sense that he was a prosecutor or appellate reviewer in three significant military trials. He oversaw critical aspects of the trials of General Fitz John Porter in 1863, Surgeon General William Hammond in 1864 and the military commission trial of the Lincoln assassination conspirators in 1864.

== United States House of Representatives ==
Bingham defeated incumbent congressman Joseph Worthington White in the next congressional election. For this election, Ohio had changed its law and now allowed soldiers away from home to vote by mail. Bingham returned to serve in the 39th Congress, which first met on March 4, 1865.

=== Lincoln assassination trial ===
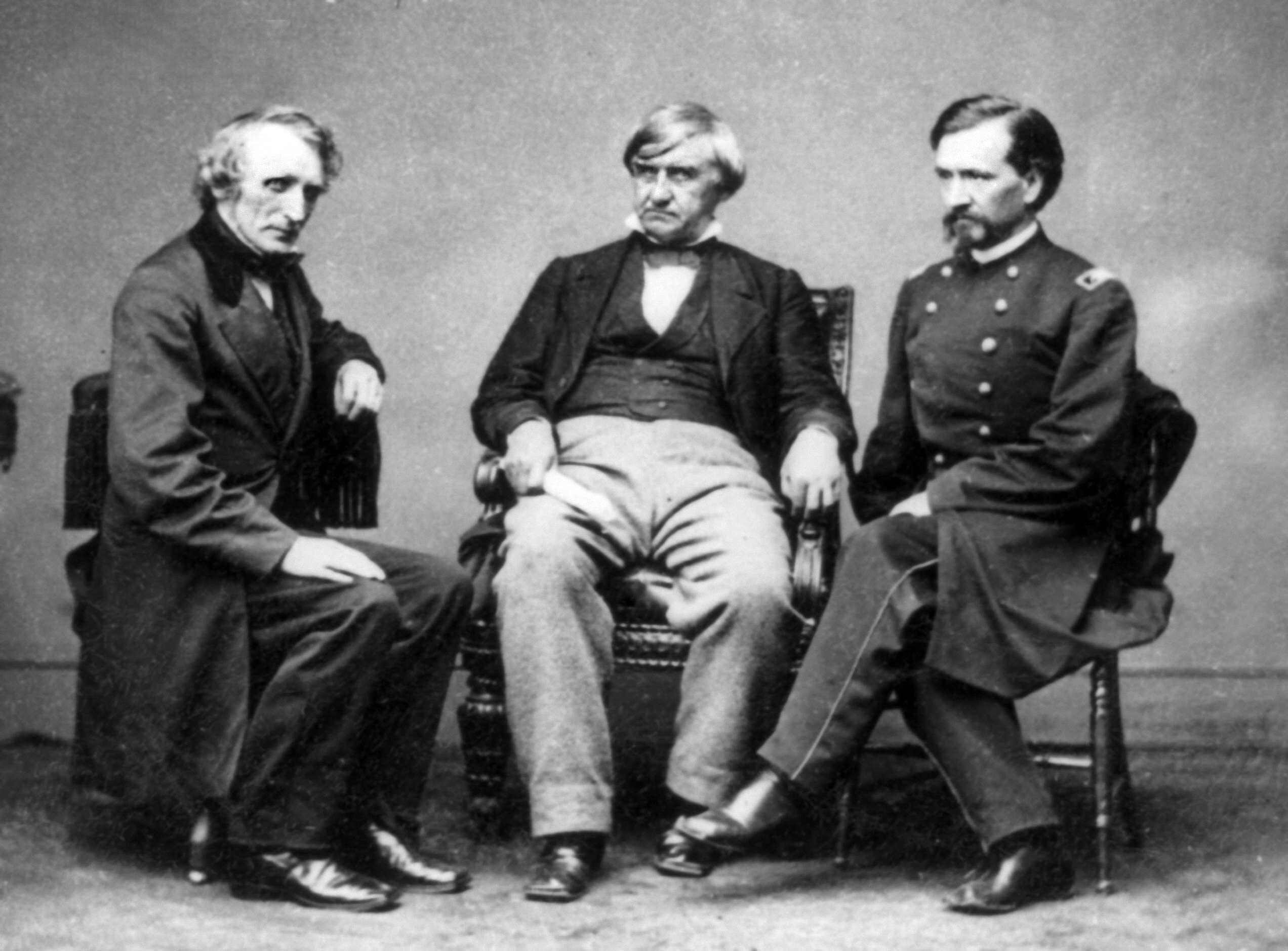
John Bingham (left), along with Joseph Holt (center) and Henry Burnett (right), were the three prosecutors in charge of the Lincoln assassination trial.

The following month, the capital fell into chaos as John Wilkes Booth assassinated President Abraham Lincoln, and Booth's co-conspirator Lewis Powell severely injured Secretary of State William H. Seward on the night of April 14, 1865. Booth died on April 26, 1865, from a gunshot wound. When the trials for the conspirators were ready to start, Bingham's old friend from Cadiz, Edwin Stanton, appointed him to serve as Assistant Judge Advocate General along with General Henry Burnett, another Assistant Judge Advocate General, and Joseph Holt, the Judge Advocate General.

The accused conspirators were George Atzerodt, David Herold, Lewis Powell (Paine), Samuel Arnold, Michael O'Laughlen, Edman Spangler, Samuel Mudd and Mary Surratt. The trial began on May 10, 1865. On June 29, 1865, the eight were found guilty for their involvement in the conspiracy to kill the president. Spangler was sentenced to six years in prison, Arnold, O'Laughlen and Mudd were sentenced to life in prison and Atzerodt, Herold, Powell and Surratt were sentenced to hang. They were executed July 7, 1865. Surratt was the first woman in American history to be executed by the Federal government of the United States. O'Laughlen died in prison in 1867. Arnold, Spangler and Mudd were pardoned by President Andrew Johnson in early 1869.

=== Fourteenth Amendment ===
In 1866, during the 39th Congress, Bingham was appointed to a subcommittee of the Joint Committee on Reconstruction tasked with considering suffrage proposals. Bingham submitted several versions of an amendment to the Constitution to apply the Bill of Rights to the states. His final submission, which was accepted by the committee on April 28, 1866, read, "No State shall make or enforce any law which shall abridge the privileges or immunities of citizens of the United States; nor shall any State deprive any person of life, liberty, or property without due process of law, nor deny to any person within its jurisdiction the equal protection of the laws." The committee recommended that the language become Section 1 of the Fourteenth Amendment to the United States Constitution. It was introduced in the spring of 1866, passing both houses by June 1866.

In the closing debate in the House, Bingham stated:

[M]any instances of State injustice and oppression have already occurred in the State legislation of this Union, of flagrant violations of the guarantied privileges of citizens of the United States, for which the national Government furnished and could furnish by law no remedy whatever. Contrary to the express letter of your Constitution, 'cruel and unusual punishments' have been inflicted under State laws within this Union upon citizens, not only for crimes committed, but for sacred duty done, for which and against which the Government of the United States had provided no remedy and could provide none. It was an opprobrium to the Republic that for fidelity to the United States they could not by national law be protected against the degrading punishment inflicted on slaves and felons by State law. That great want of the citizen and stranger, protection by national law from unconstitutional State enactments, is supplied by the first section of this amendment.

Except for the addition of the first sentence of Section 1, which defined citizenship, the amendment weathered the Senate debate without substantial change. The Fourteenth Amendment was ratified in 1868.

Despite Bingham's likely intention for the Fourteenth Amendment to apply the first eight amendments of the Bill of Rights to the states, the U.S. Supreme Court declined to interpret it that way in the Slaughter-House Cases and in United States v. Cruikshank. In the 1947 case of Adamson v. California, Supreme Court justice Hugo Black argued in his dissent that the framers' intent should control the court's interpretation of the Fourteenth Amendment, and he attached a lengthy appendix that quoted extensively from Bingham's congressional testimony. Though the Adamson Court declined to adopt Black's interpretation, the court over the next 25 years used a doctrine of selective incorporation to extend to application against the states the protections in the Bill of Rights as well as other unenumerated rights.

Ohio ratified the Fourteenth Amendment on January 4, 1867, but Bingham continued to explain its extension of citizenship during the fall election season. The Fourteenth Amendment has vastly expanded civil rights protections and has come to be cited in more litigation than any other amendment to the Constitution. In retrospect The National Constitution Center described John Bingham as "a leading Republican in the U.S. House of Representatives during Reconstruction and the primary author of Section 1 of the 14th Amendment. This key provision wrote the Declaration of Independence’s promise of freedom and equality into the Constitution. Because of Bingham’s crucial role in framing this constitutional text, Justice Hugo Black would later describe him as the 14th Amendment’s James Madison." It hailed him as "Second Founder who most worked to realize the universal promise of Madison’s Bill and Jefferson’s Declaration."

=== Later congressional career ===
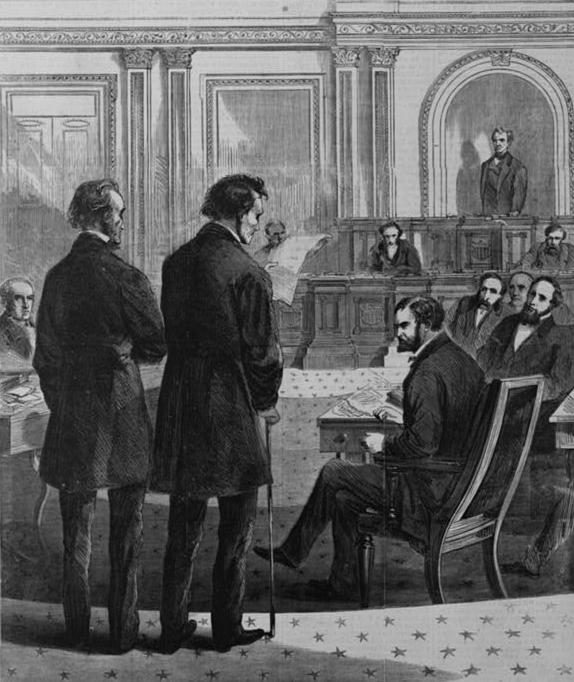
Bingham and Thaddeus Stevens appearing before the Senate to inform the Senate of the House's vote to impeach President Andrew Johnson

Bingham continued his career as a representative and was reelected to the 40th, 41st and 42nd Congresses. He served as chairman of the Committee on Claims from 1867 to 1869 and a member of the Committee on the Judiciary from 1869 to 1873.

==== Impeachment of Andrew Johnson ====
Bingham played a prominent role in combatting a number of early efforts by Radical Republicans to impeach President Andrew Johnson.

On March 7, 1867, during House debate on a proposed amendment to a resolution renewing the first impeachment inquiry against Andrew Johnson, Wilson was questioned by Benjamin Butler as to whether or not he supported impeaching President Johnson. Bingham responded by declaring that, unlike some individuals, he was opposed to impeaching before having testimony. After the inquiry recommended that the House impeach Johnson, on December 7, 1867, Bingham was in the sizable majority of House members present that voted against impeaching Johnson.

On February 24, 1868, Bingham voted to impeach Johnson when the House voted to do so after Johnson having moved to oust Secretary of War Edwin M. Stanton in apparent disregard for the Tenure of Office Act. Bingham was voted to serve as one of the House managers (prosecutors) in the subsequent impeachment trial of President Johnson.

=== Failure to be reelected in 1872 ===
Bingham was implicated in the Crédit Mobilier scandal and in 1872, he lost the election. Three local Republican political bosses made a deal to cut Bingham out, instead selecting Lorenzo Danford as the party's candidate. Thus, Danford came to represent the 16th district in the 43rd Congress and was reelected several times, but with a hiatus.

== Minister to Japan ==
President Ulysses Grant then appointed his ally Bingham as United States Minister to Japan, which involved a salary increase but also economic responsibilities with respect to the small legation. (The legation was upgraded to embassy status and the title of minister was upgraded to ambassador in the early 20th century.) Initially, Bingham tried to switch appointments with John Watson Foster of Indiana, whom Grant had appointed minister to Mexico, but Foster declined. Bingham thus sailed with his wife and two of his three daughters to Japan. Bingham served longer than any other minister to Japan, with his appointment spanning the terms of four Republican presidents from May 31, 1873, to July 2, 1885. His successor was appointed in 1885 by newly elected Democratic president Grover Cleveland.

Bingham moved the embassy from an unsuitable location and replaced a problematic interpreter with a Presbyterian missionary from Ohio. He then managed to curtail the imperialistic ambitions of fellow Union veteran Charles Le Gendre. Bingham came to greatly respect Japanese culture, but he also presciently expressed his fear that Japan's military culture would hurt the country's development.

Bingham most prominently distinguished himself from other Western diplomats by fighting against the unequal treaties imposed upon Japan by Britain, particularly provisions for extraterritoriality and tariff control by Westerners. Initially, Bingham supported Japan's right to restrict hunting by foreigners to certain times and places and later its right to regulate incoming ships via quarantines to restrict the spread of cholera. Bingham later negotiated return of the Shimonoseki indemnity in 1877 as well as a revision of Japan's treaty with the United States in 1879, which restored some tariff autonomy to Japan, conditioned upon other treaties with Westerners.

== Later life and death ==
Bingham was a delegate to the 1888 Republican National Convention. In his later years, he was frequently interviewed by journalists on topics ranging from current events in Japan to his 1857 appointment of George Armstrong Custer to the United States Military Academy. He died in Cadiz on March 19, 1900, nine years after his wife Amanda had died. He was interred next to her in the Old Cadiz (Union) Cemetery in Cadiz.

== Legacy ==
In 1901, Harrison County erected a bronze statue honoring Bingham in Cadiz.

Bingham's house now serves as Mercer County's Republican headquarters.

== Sources ==
- Gerard N. Magliocca, American Founding Son: John Bingham and the Invention of the Fourteenth Amendment. New York: New York University Press, 2013.
- Sam Kidder, Of One Blood All Nations: John Bingham: Ohio Congressman's Diplomatic Career in Meiji Japan (1873–1885). Portsmouth, New Hampshire: Piscataqua Press. 2020.

U.S. House of Representatives
Preceded by Andrew Stuart	Member of the U.S. House of Representatives from Ohio's 21st congressional district March 4, 1855 – March 3, 1863	Succeeded by Martin A. Foran
Preceded by Joseph Worthington White	Member of the U.S. House of Representatives from Ohio's 16th congressional district March 4, 1865 – March 3, 1873	Succeeded by Lorenzo Danford
Diplomatic posts
Preceded by Charles E. DeLong	United States Ambassador to Japan; 1873–1885	Succeeded by Richard B. Hubbard
