= Joseph Gilman (1738–1806) =

American politician

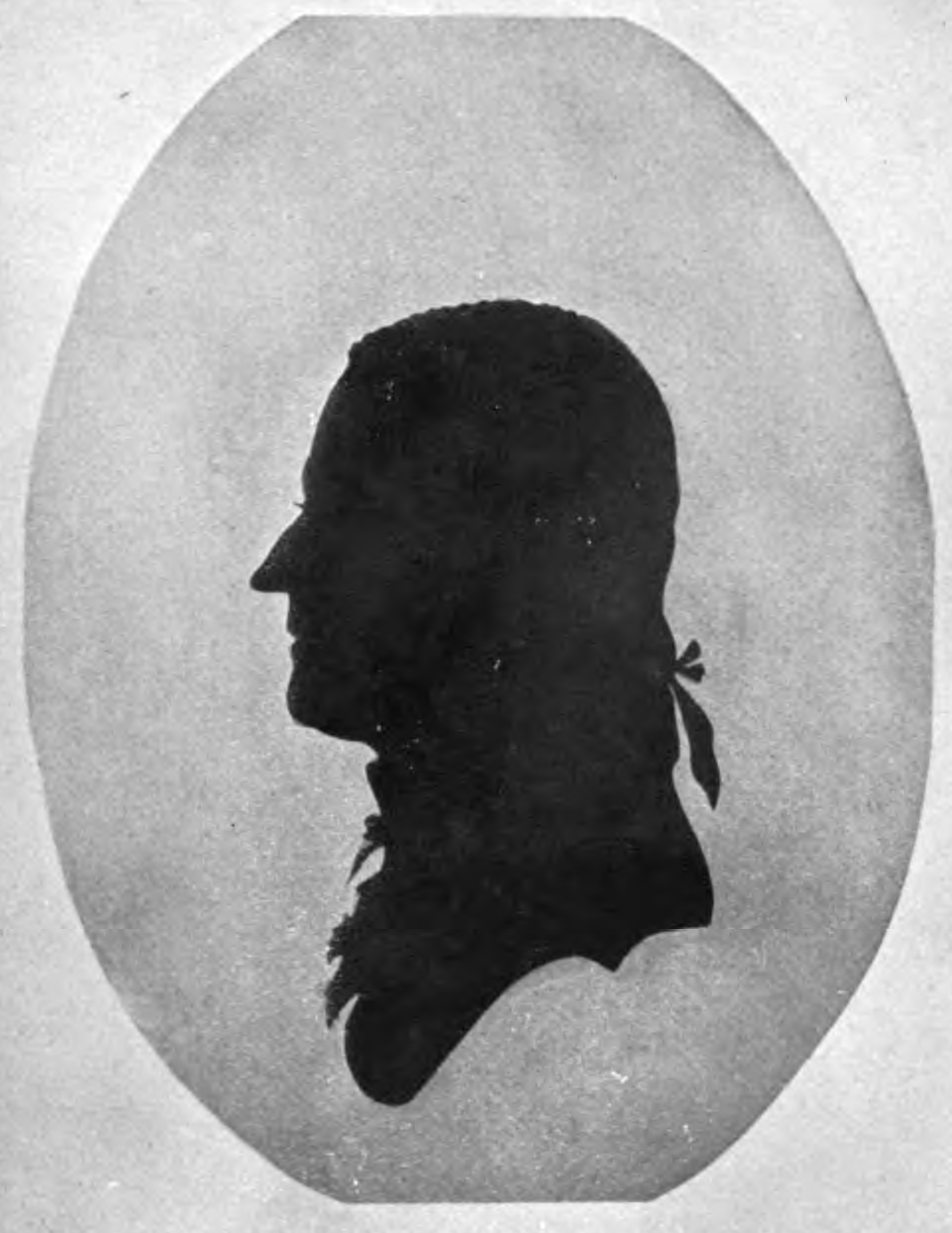

Judge of the Northwest Territory
- In office December 1796 – March 1803 Serving with John Cleves Symmes; Return Jonathan Meigs Jr.
- Appointed by: George Washington
- Preceded by: Rufus Putnam
- Succeeded by: territory eliminated

Personal details
- Born: May 5, 1738 Exeter, New Hampshire
- Died: May 14, 1806 (aged 68) Marietta, Ohio
- Resting place: Greenwood Cemetery, Brooklyn, New York
- Spouses: Jane Tyler; Rebecca Ives
- Children: Robert, Benjamin

Joseph Gilman (5 May 1738 – 14 May 1806) was an American pioneer settler in the Northwest Territory of the United States. Prior to his immigration to the frontier, he was a state senator in New Hampshire, and member of the Committee of Safety. President Washington appointed him to be one of three judges in the territory in 1796. He served until the territory was dissolved in 1803.

== Youth ==
Joseph Gilman was the son of Reverend Nicholas Gilman and Mary (Thing) Gilman. He was born in Exeter, New Hampshire, on May 5, 1738. He was the brother of minister Tristram Gilman (1735–1809) and a cousin of Nicholas Gilman. He was educated in his hometown, and went to Boston, Massachusetts, at age fifteen to work for a merchant. He stayed there until at least 1760, and in 1761 entered into partnership for seven years with Nathaniel Folsom and Josiah Gilman in Exeter as Folsom, Gilman and Gilman to keep a store, build ships and make seas voyages. They had extensive dealings in England and the Caribbean.

Gilman was married to Jane Tyler, who probably died in 1760, and then to Rebecca Ives (1745-1823) of Beverly, Massachusetts, in 1763. They had sons Robert (1764-1766) and Benjamin (1766-1833).

== Public life ==
In the autumn of 1776, Gilman was appointed by the New Hampshire House of Representatives as Treasurer of Rockingham County, and in 1779 he was commissioned as a justice of the peace. He was elected to the New Hampshire Senate twice, and served from 1784 to 1787. He was the chairman of the New Hampshire Committee of Safety in the American Revolutionary War, a group responsible for supplies for the state's troops. At the end of the war, the currency collapsed, and debts were hard to collect. Gilman became an associate of the Ohio Company of Associates, and decided to emigrate to the Northwest Territory with his wife and son for a fresh start.

== Life in Northwest Territory ==
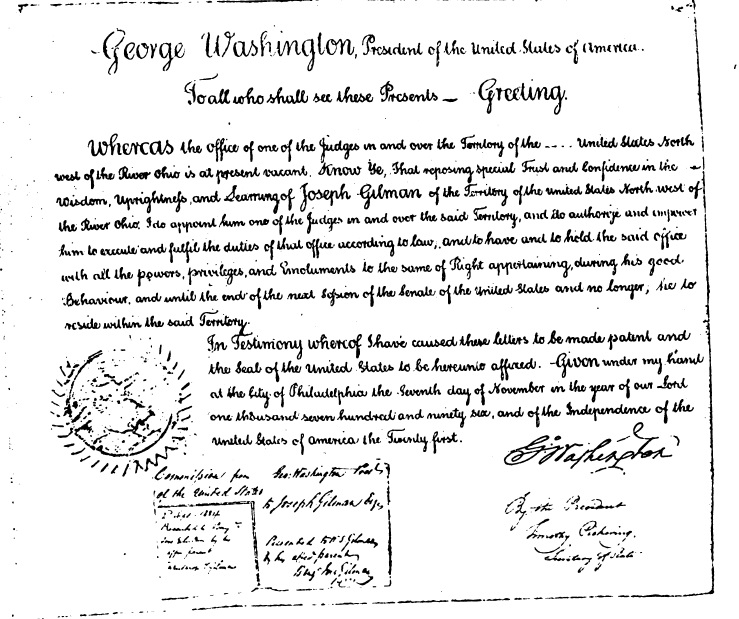
President Washington appointed Gilman a Judge of the Northwest Territory in 1796

Gilman and family arrived at Marietta in 1789. In 1790, Territorial Governor Arthur St. Clair appointed him as Judge of Probate, Judge of the Court of Quarter Sessions, Justice of the Peace, and Judge of the Court of Common Pleas. In 1796, Rufus Putnam resigned as a Judge of the Northwest Territory to accept appointment as Surveyor General of the Northwest Territory. President Washington appointed Gilman to the judicial position, with consent of the Senate, and he served until Ohio became a state and the territory was dissolved in 1803. Gilman had to travel for the court, as sessions were held in Vincennes, Detroit, and Cincinnati, as well as at Marietta.

He was not a profound lawyer, but a careful, upright judge. He was candid and usually guided to correct conclusions by his strong common sense, industry, and desire to be right. He was a student and also possessed admirable social traits.

— Manning Force, 1897

Gilman died at Marietta on May 14, 1806. He was buried there, but his grandson Winthrop Sargent Gilman had him re-interred many years later at the Gilman family plot at Greenwood Cemetery in Brooklyn, New York.
