= Ephraim Cutler =

American politician

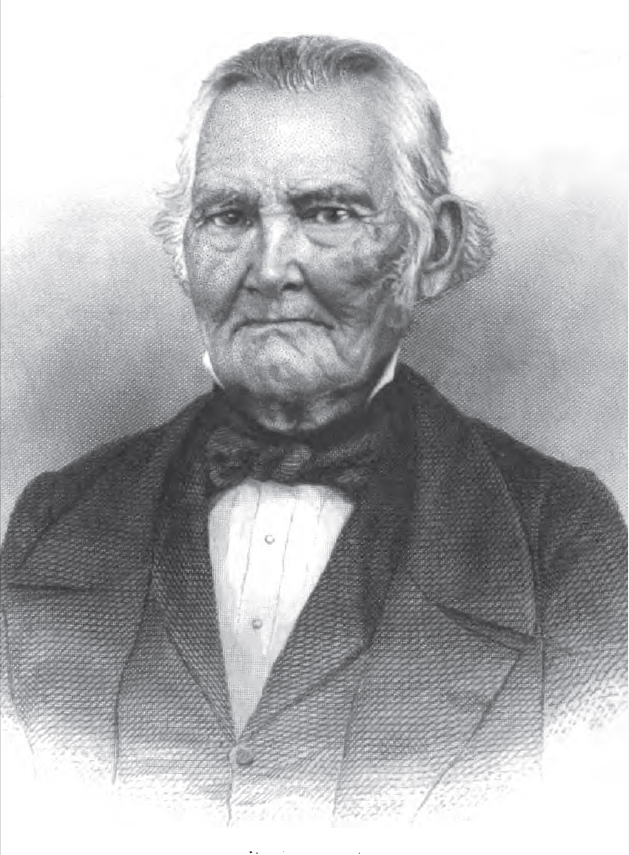

Delegate to 1802 Ohio Constitutional Convention from Washington County
- In office November 1, 1802 – November 29, 1802 Serving with: Benjamin Ives Gilman; John McIntire; Rufus Putnam

Personal details
- Born: April 13, 1767 Edgartown, Massachusetts
- Died: July 8, 1853 (aged 86) Belpre, Ohio
- Resting place: Gravel Bank Cemetery, Marietta, Ohio
- Party: Federalist; Whig
- Spouses: Leah Atwood (m. 1787; died 1807); Sally Parker (m. 1808; died 1846)
- Children: 11

Ephraim Cutler (April 13, 1767 – July 8, 1853) was an early Northwest Territory and Ohio political leader and jurist.

== Early and family life ==
Ephraim Cutler was born in Edgartown, Massachusetts on April 13, 1767. The oldest son of Manasseh Cutler, he was named for his father's brother, who had been thrown from a horse and died the previous year. From age three, he lived with his grandparents in Killingly, Connecticut, and only once was taken to visit his father and siblings, though they sometimes visited. Ephraim Cutler loved to read, but did not attend Yale College, as had his father, because the American Revolutionary War made such "impracticable," although he later often regretted his lack of formal education and would frequently misspell words in his letters. Instead, Ephraim took over his grandfather's farm when he was 16, and also ran a shop by the 1790s.

When he was 20, Ephraim married Leah Atwood (of Killingly), on April 8, 1787. In that year his father Manasseh Cutler had helped convince the Congress of the Confederation to pass the Northwest Ordinance, which established a political framework for settlement beyond the Appalachian Mountains. Manassah Cutler was a leader of the Ohio Company of Associates, a land company which bought a large tract in what is now southeast Ohio. Ephraim Cutler became a sales agent for the company, and sold twenty subscriptions. These shareholders elected him to represent them at a meeting of the company in 1788, even though he was not yet of legal age. Meanwhile, his younger brother Jervis Cutler had left for Marietta, Ohio in 1787, but by 1794 returned to New England to marry.

Ephraim's first wife, Leah, suffered from delicate health for years after giving birth to several children, and losing two en route to Ohio before giving birth to the two children who survived her. She died of tuberculosis on November 3, 1807, but insisted that Cutler remarry. Though they had never met, she specifically suggested Ephraim marry Sally Parker of Newburyport, Massachusetts (the daughter of Ohio Company stockholder William Parker), who would be a mother to their surviving children. Cutler followed the advice, writing to and eventually marrying Sally, who bore several children.

== Northwest ==
After hearing about General Anthony Wayne's victory at the Battle of Fallen Timbers in August 1794, and hoping that southern Ohio's climate could restore his wife's health, Ephraim Cutler decided to move his family from Killingly. Thus, he sold the farm, and on June 15, 1795, set out with his wife, four children (aged 7 through 1 year old) and several members of the family of Revolutionary War general Israel Putnam for Ohio. They traveled by foot (the Cutlers accompanied by a two horses, a cow and cart drawn by oxen) to the Monongahela River near Williamsport, Pennsylvania, where they had a Kentucky flat-boat built. The river was low, so progress was slow. The boat finally landed at Marietta on September 18, 1795, after 31 days on the river. However, their eldest and youngest children (Mary and Hezekiah) fell ill and died along the way. Leah Cutler also fell and broke two ribs, and her husband contracted dysentery, but recovered in a rented room in the blockhouse of Campus Martius.

With Ephraim Cutler's recovery in October, the family moved up the Muskingum River to Waterford, Ohio, where some Killingly families had settled and offered shelter, as well as hired Ephraim to help them plow. Cutler also settled company business in Marietta that autumn and Rufus Putnam paid him $100 to survey land in the Donation Tract. In 1796 he bought some land nearby, and later helped develop and market a salt spring. Cutler also received commissions from Governor Arthur St. Clair, becoming captain of the militia, Justice of the Peace and Judge of the Court of Common Pleas. By 1799 he became the first settler in what would become Ames Township, Athens County, Ohio, moving his wife, two surviving children from Connecticut, and two children born in the Northwest. In 1800, the Legislature of the Northwest Territory named Cutler to examine and lease the School Lands sections in his part of the territory, which involved a great deal of travel. He convinced the people of Ames Township to establish the Western Library Association in 1804, one of the earliest libraries formed in the Northwest Territory. Money was raised for the library through sale furs and other items. It came to be called the "Coonskin Library." It was not the first incorporated in the state, as three others in the state had been incorporated before it was incorporated in February, 1810. Cutler was elected the first librarian.

== Territory politics ==
In September, 1801, Cutler was elected to represent Washington County, Ohio in the House of Representatives of the Northwest Territory at the First Session of the Second Territorial General Assembly convened November 23, 1801 – January 23, 1802, where he drafted the legislation that incorporated the predecessor to Ohio University. After adjournment, he visited his father in Washington, D.C., where he sat as a member of Congress from Massachusetts, and where Ephraim witnessed the passing of the Ohio Enabling Act. This act allowed for four delegates to be elected from Washington County, which then included Cutler's home. Cutler was nominated by his party at a county convention to be one of those four, who were each elected as delegates in September, and Cutler sat as a delegate to the Ohio Constitutional Convention November 1–29, 1802, which wrote the Constitution accepted by Congress, and led to statehood in 1803.

The first vote at the convention after procedural issues had been settled was on the approval of "Resolved, That it is of the opinion of the convention, that it is expedient, at this time, to form a constitution and State government." It was resolved Yeas, 32, nays, 1, with Ephraim Cutler the only Federalist to vote nay. Nevertheless, he participated vigorously, and managed to affect the outcome on several issues. Cutler also tried, without success, to have the Constitution submitted to a referendum by the population, saying "I deem it of primary importance that the people of this territory should have some opportunity of declaring their assent to or dissent from this instrument before it became binding on them...By adopting the resolution to submit the constitution to a vote of the people the mouths of the clamorous would be stopped, and the minds of the judicious satisfied." The delegates voted 27–7 against, preferring haste.

== Statehood ==
Cutler was township Justice of the Peace 1803-1805 and township trustee of Ames Township in 1806, but Cutler's wife fell ill, and the family moved to Belpre, or Constitution, Warren Township, a ghost town outside of Belpre, to be near a doctor. She died November 3, 1807, and Cutler sent his nine-year-old son Daniel to Massachusetts to live with his grandparents. On April 13, 1808, he married Sally Parker, a native of Newburyport, Massachusetts, with whom he had five more children, four of whom survived to adulthood, including William P. Cutler, who would serve as speaker of the Ohio House, and as a member of Congress.

Early in statehood, Federalists fell out of favor. Consequently, Cutler had to wait until passions cooled to be elected to represent Washington County in the Ohio House of Representatives in the Eighteenth General Assembly (1819–1820) and in the Ohio Senate in the Twenty-second and Twenty-third General Assembly (1823–1825) Both topics in which he had greatest effect in the legislature was establishment of a common school system to replace the strictly local efforts up to that time, and for reform of land taxes from a direct system to an ad valorem system. Under the direct system, land was levied by acre, without reference to value. Thus small, but wealthy Hamilton County paid less land tax to the state than large, but mostly rural Washington County. This was politically tolerable until taxes would have to rise significantly to pay for canals between Lake Erie and the Ohio River. At that point, Cutler's arguments finally won out, and taxes began to be assessed on value, rather than acreage. Cutler also lobbied vigorously for the interests of Ohio University, where he was a Trustee from 1820 to 1849.

In later years, Cutler was a delegate to the General Assembly of the Presbyterian Church in 1835 in Pittsburgh, and 1837 in Philadelphia, and in 1839 he was a delegate representing the Sixth Congressional District of Ohio at the National Convention of the Whig Party in 1839. In 1841, he was first President of the Marietta Historical Association, and he assisted Dr. Hildreth in his history. He also helped to organize and participated in the Underground Railroad.

Sally Cutler died June 30, 1846. In spring of 1853, Ephraim fell from a horse, and after four months of invalidism, he succumbed on July 8, 1853. The obituary in the Marietta Intelligencer read "In every sphere and relation of life, Judge Cutler was a useful man. He was an upright judge, an intelligent legislator, a good neighbor, a public-spirited citizen, an affectionate father, a sincere Christian, and an honest, true man."

== See also ==
- Manasseh Cutler
- William P. Cutler

== Notes ==
Ohio House of Representatives
Preceded by Sylvester Ames; Joseph Barker	Representative from Washington County; December 6, 1819-December 3, 1820; Served alongside: Elijah Hatch	Succeeded by Alexander McConnell; Timothy Buell
Ohio Senate
Preceded by Sardine Stone	Senator from Washington & Athens District; December 1, 1823-December 4, 1825	Succeeded by Eben Currier
