= Great Black Swamp =

Wetland in Ohio, Indiana, and Michigan, United States

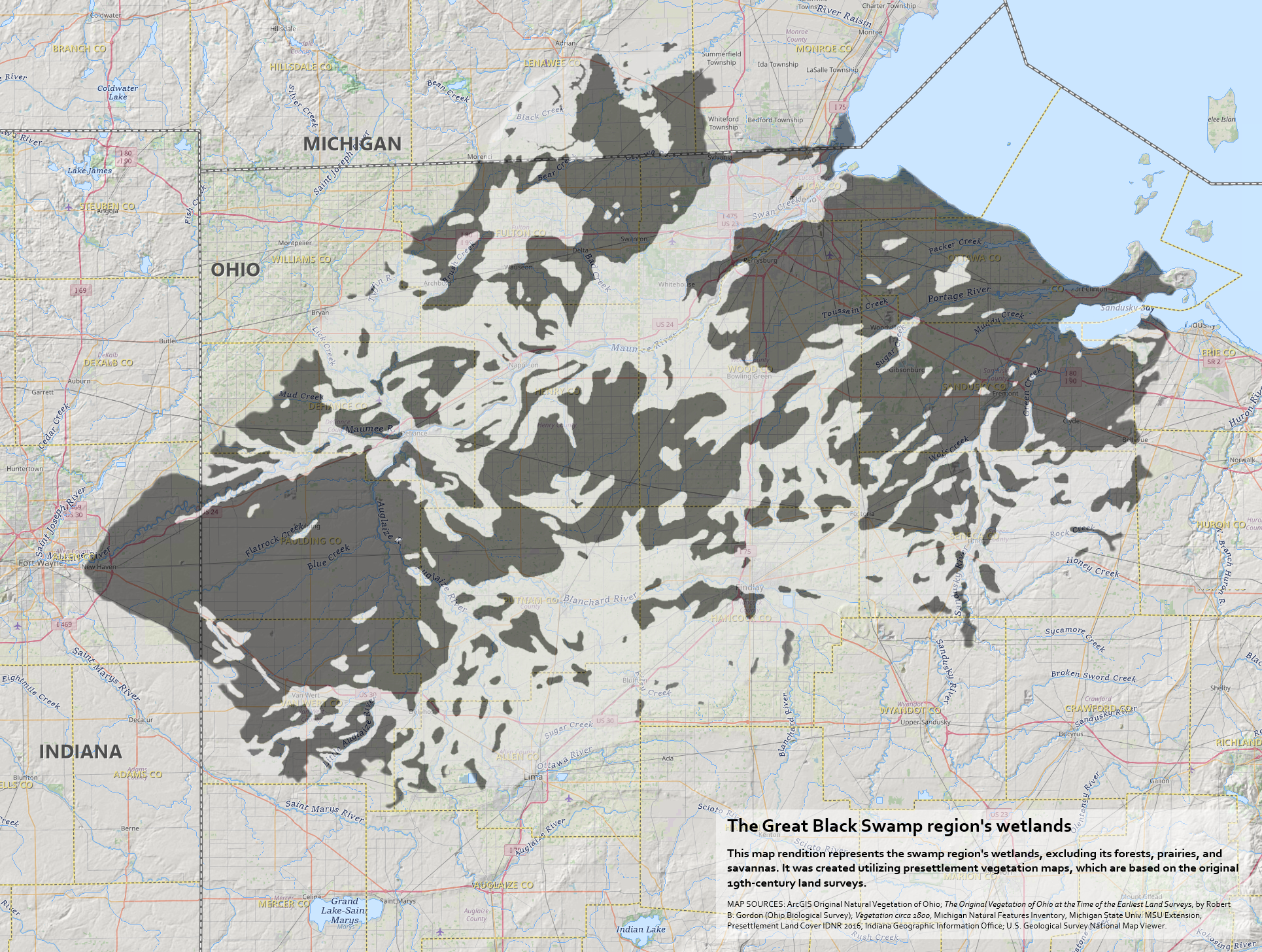
- Map of the Great Black Swamp wetlands, based on GIS presettlement vegetation maps of 19th century land surveys
- Interactive map of Great Black Swamp
- Location: NW Ohio, NE Indiana, SE Michigan, United States
- Coordinates: 41°0′N 84°0′W
- Max. length: 120 miles (190 km)
- Max. width: 39 miles (63 km)

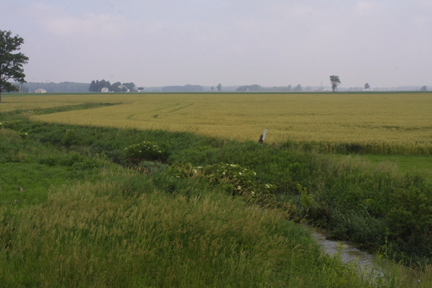
A photo from a glacial ridge (near Benton Ridge) in the former Great Black Swamp. It overlooks a flat expanse of farmland with a ditch.

The Great Black Swamp (or Black Swamp) was a glacially fed wetland in northwest Ohio, northeast Indiana, and southeast Michigan that existed from the end of the Wisconsin glaciation until the late 19th century. Comprising extensive swamps and marshes interspersed with drier ground, it occupied what was formerly the southwestern part of proglacial Lake Maumee, a precursor to Lake Erie. It was the home of Indigenous nations for thousands of years until forced Indian removal in the early 19th century.

The Ohio Department of Natural Resources stated the Great Black Swamp covered 3,072,000 acres (1,243,000 ha) and its Lake Erie marshes covered 300,000 acres (120,000 ha). Other estimates claim the wetlands covered 1,500 square miles (3,900 km^{2}); or 2,600 square miles (6,700 km^{2}); or were 140 miles (230 km) wide.

Ohio has lost more than 90% of its wetlands, 60% of which were in the Great Black Swamp region. The swamp was drained between 1859 and 1885 to become highly productive farmland, enabling its eighteen counties in 2022 to generate over $3.2 billion from crop revenues and over $1 billion from livestock revenues. However, its agricultural runoff has degraded the environment. This causes frequent harmful algal blooms in Lake Erie.

According to 19th-century land surveys and Geographic Information System (GIS) presettlement vegetation maps, the swamp existed within the Maumee, Ottawa, Portage, and Sandusky watersheds, and in the River Raisin's southern headwaters. Its boundary was determined by post-glacial landforms after glacial retreat thousands of years ago.

The vast swamp was a mosaic of deciduous forests, wetlands, and prairies shaped by terrain and drainage. Lower elevations hosted swamps, with species such as ash, elm, cottonwood and sycamore. Marshes, fens, wet meadows, and wet prairies were also present, especially along the Lake Erie shoreline east of Toledo. Slightly higher elevations hosted mesic species such as beech, maple, basswood, and tuliptree. Dry ridges (moraines) hosted upland species like oak and hickory.

Current wetlands such as the Okefenokee Swamp, the Great Dismal Swamp, the Atchafalaya Swamp, and the Everglades suggest the importance of the biodiversity within the ecosystems of the former Great Black Swamp region. Species once common within and around the swamp are now listed by Ohio as threatened, endangered, or extinct.

The Great Black Swamp's history exemplifies how Indigenous peoples were forcibly removed and ecosystems destroyed for development. The swamp's history of destruction is similar to that of Tulare Lake in California and the Grand Kankakee Marsh in Indiana and Illinois. Scientific understanding about wetland ecology has grown since the 1970s, increasing public attention on the economic, environmental, and public health values of wetlands like the Great Black Swamp. This attention has contributed to important policies on wetland conservation (both American and international), natural resource management, wildlife conservation, and global efforts to prevent forced Indigenous removal, pollution, ecocide, environmental disasters, ecosystem collapse, and extinction caused by humans.

== Natural history of the swamp ==
=== Geology and hydrology ===
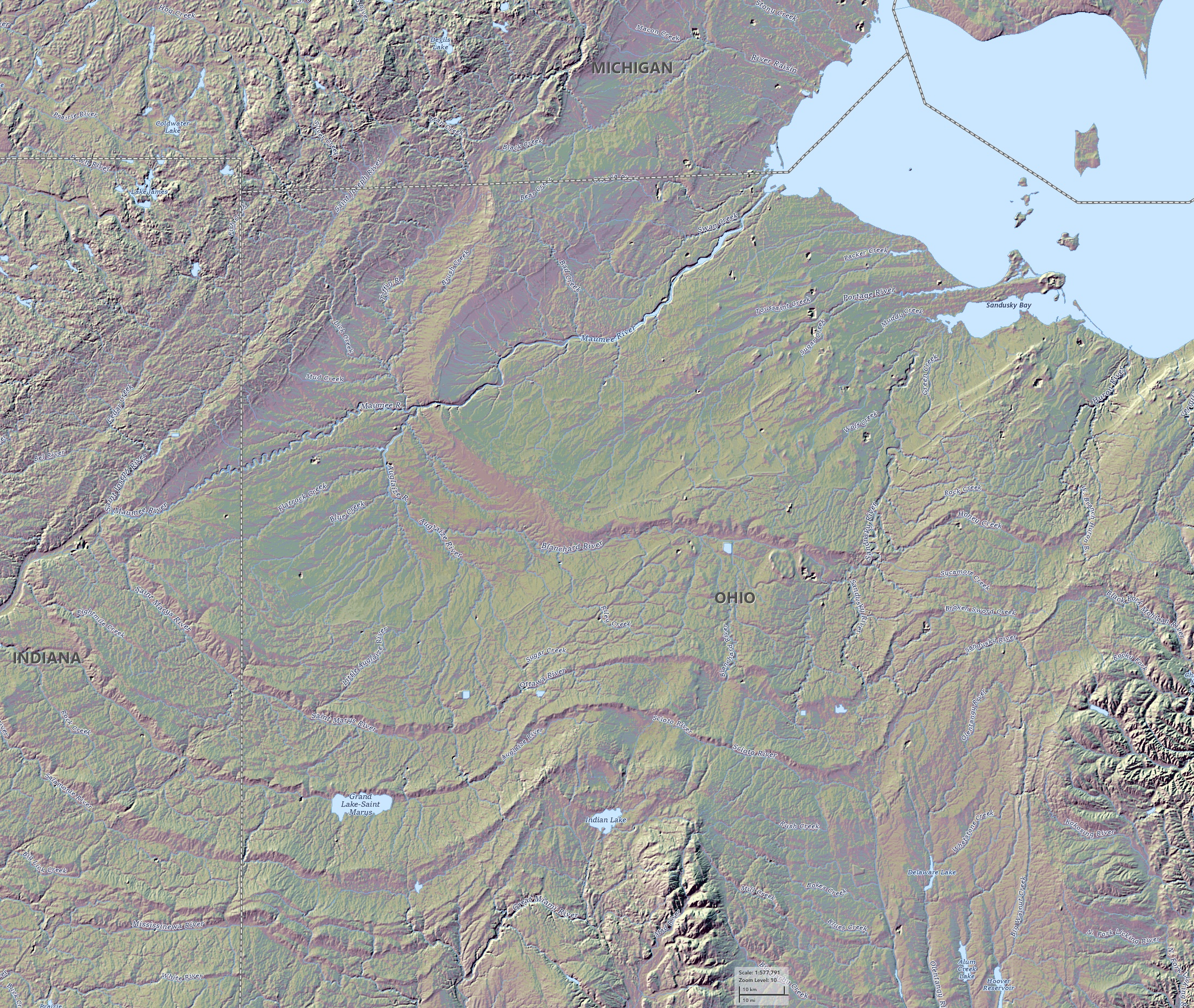
A Lidar DEM of the Laurentide ice sheet's footprints in which the Great Black Swamp developed. The image shows how the ice shaped moraines and flat terrain of glacial till across Indiana, Ohio, and Michigan.

The Laurentide ice sheet covered northeast Indiana, northwest Ohio, and southeast Michigan during the Last Glacial Period, reaching estimated heights of 984–1,640 feet (300–500 m) near the Great Lakes and 7,500 feet (2,300 m) above sea level elsewhere. Following its gradual retreat about 24,000 years ago, it left behind Lake Maumee. The Maumee Torrent drained the lake catastrophically 14,000–17,000 years before present (YBP).

After the Maumee Torrent, the region developed the following proglacial lakes as water levels dropped: Arkona (13,800–13,600 YBP); Ypsilanti (13,600–13,000 YBP); Whittlesey (13,000–12,800 YBP); Warren and Wayne (12,800–12,500 YBP); Grassmere and Lundy (12,500–12,400 YBP); Early and Middle Lake Erie (12,400–4,000 YBP); and modern Lake Erie (4,000 YBP). Isosatic rebound (an uplift of the Earth's crust from the ice sheet's removal) occurred 9,000 to 4,000 YBP, which impacted water flow. Drainage initially flowed west during the highest lake stages, 220 feet (67 m) above current levels, then shifted east and eventually established Lake Erie's present outline. A 2015 study determined the preceding glacial lake actually had a chain of islands instead of a traditional beach.

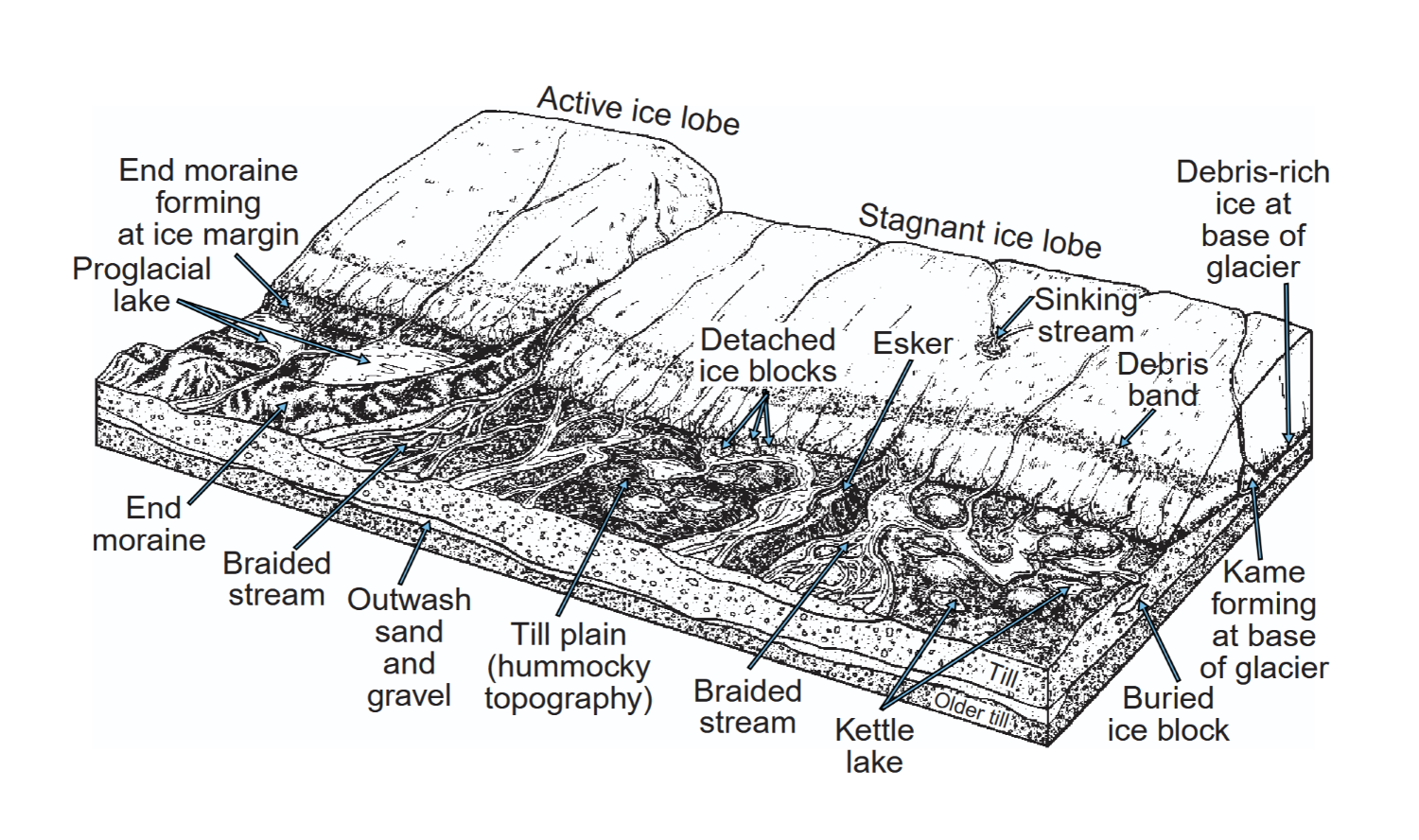
An illustration showing how a melting glacier shapes a moraine, a lacustrine plain, a proglacial lake, and other landforms. This is how the Huron-Erie Lake Plain and Lake Maumee were formed, followed later by the Great Black Swamp.

The Great Black Swamp formed on the drained Huron-Erie Lake Plain, including the Maumee Lake Plains, Paulding Plains, Marblehead Drift/Limestone Plains, and the Oak Openings. This area rests on shale and Silurian, Devonian, and Mississippian bedrock, which correlate with bedrock and glacial aquifers.

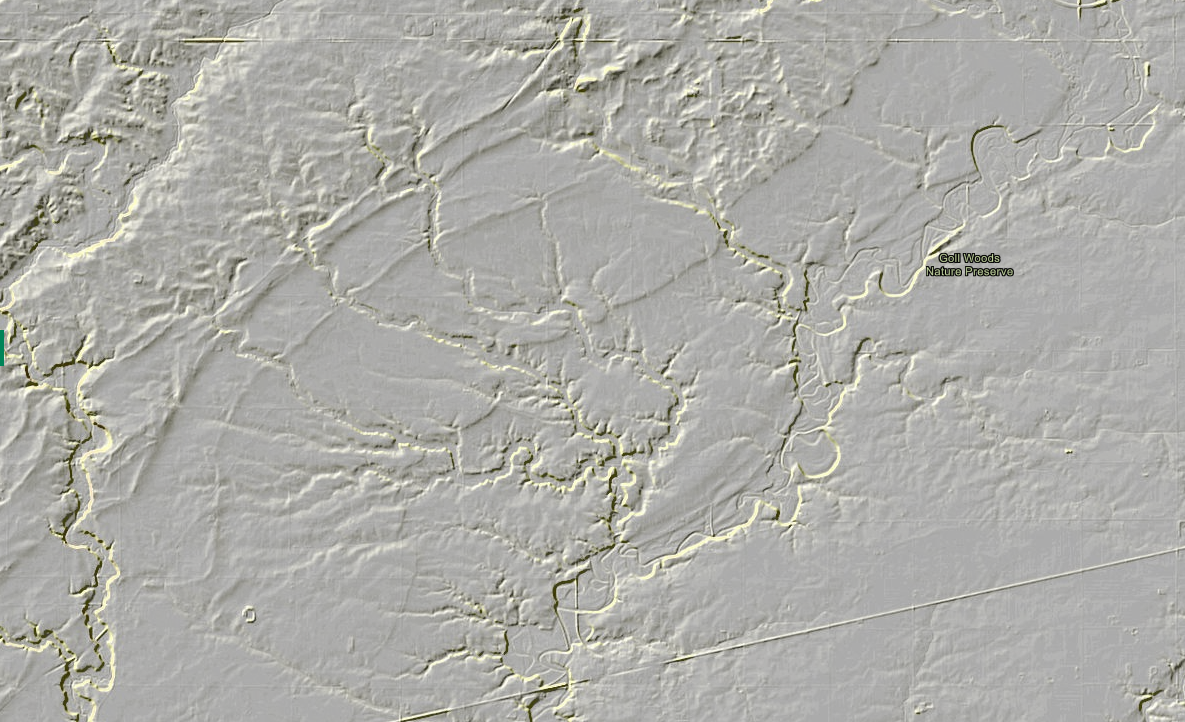
A Lidar DEM of a moraine's streams near Goll Woods. Water flowed into the Maumee, Ottawa, Sandusky, Raisin, and Portage rivers through the swamp into Lake Erie.

Limestone, with 20–80 feet (6.1–24.4 m) of clay-rich till deposited 15,000–13,000 YBP, covers the Maumee River's south side, while 90 feet (27 m) of glacial drift covers shale to the north. Drift depths vary across all Black Swamp counties, from 5 feet (1.5 m) at Allen County to 176 feet (54 m) at Williams County.

Aeolian sand dunes were deposited across the plain. The 8.2-kiloyear event, a rapid drop in global temperatures, induced two phases of wind-blown loess deposition across the swamp and Ohio 8,950 to 8,005 YBP.

End moraines created braided streams, outwash fans, and hummocky surfaces across till plains characterized by rounded knolls and depressions called "knob and kettle topography".

Historians described the swamp's streams as "sluggish in their motions, their bed having little inclination", and its ground as, "alike retaining, and alike absorbing water". The average slope of the land was about 4 feet (1 m) per 1 mile (2 km).

The weight of the ice sheet and proglacial lakes flattened the land, shaping its bedrock and soils. Tectonic forces shaped structural basins, domes, and arches in the bedrock. Varying aquifer mineralogy influenced groundwater geochemical composition.

=== Fossils ===
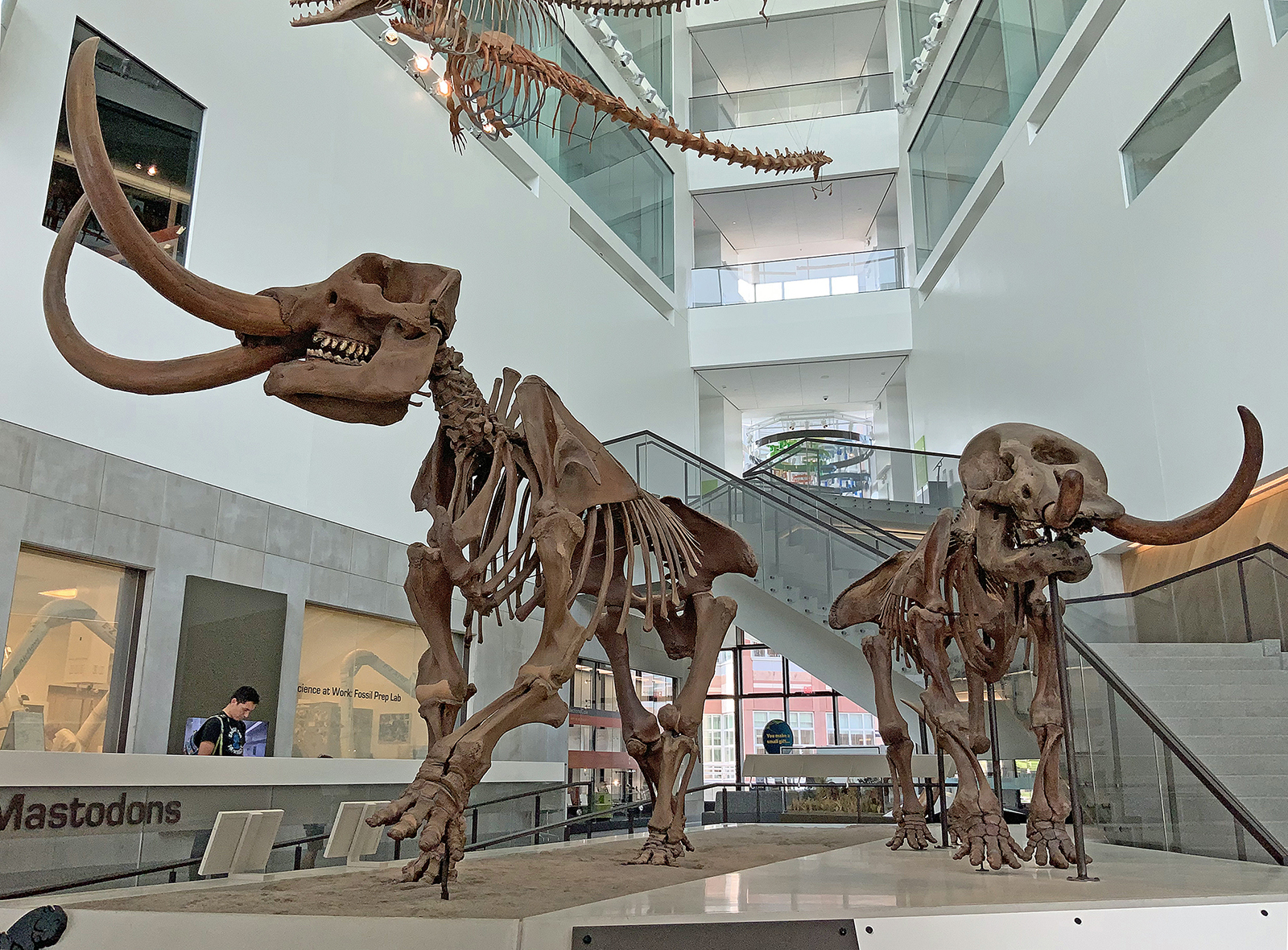
A replica of Fred the mastodon (Buesching mastodon), pictured left, based on fossils found west of the former Great Black Swamp. Pictured right is a female mastodon fossil.

The swamp's Paleozoic fossils exist in inland and shoreline quarries. Late Pleistocene and early Holocene animals included giant short-faced bears and giant beavers. A Dire wolf tooth fossil (11,000–12,000 YBP) from Sheriden Cave (east of the swamp) was used for later DNA studies.

Mastodon fossils have been discovered in the Black Swamp region since the late 19th century, in places such as Erie and Lenawee counties. In 1998, an 80% complete male mastodon fossil skeleton was discovered in Fort Wayne. The family who discovered it named it Fred, after their grandfather. About 13,000 YBP, its body sank into wetland soils after a fatal battle with another male. Scientists concluded from chemical signatures in the tusks that the mastodon's diet consisted of conifers such as spruce, which were abundant in the swamp region during the Late Pleistocene.

=== Climate and biodiversity ===
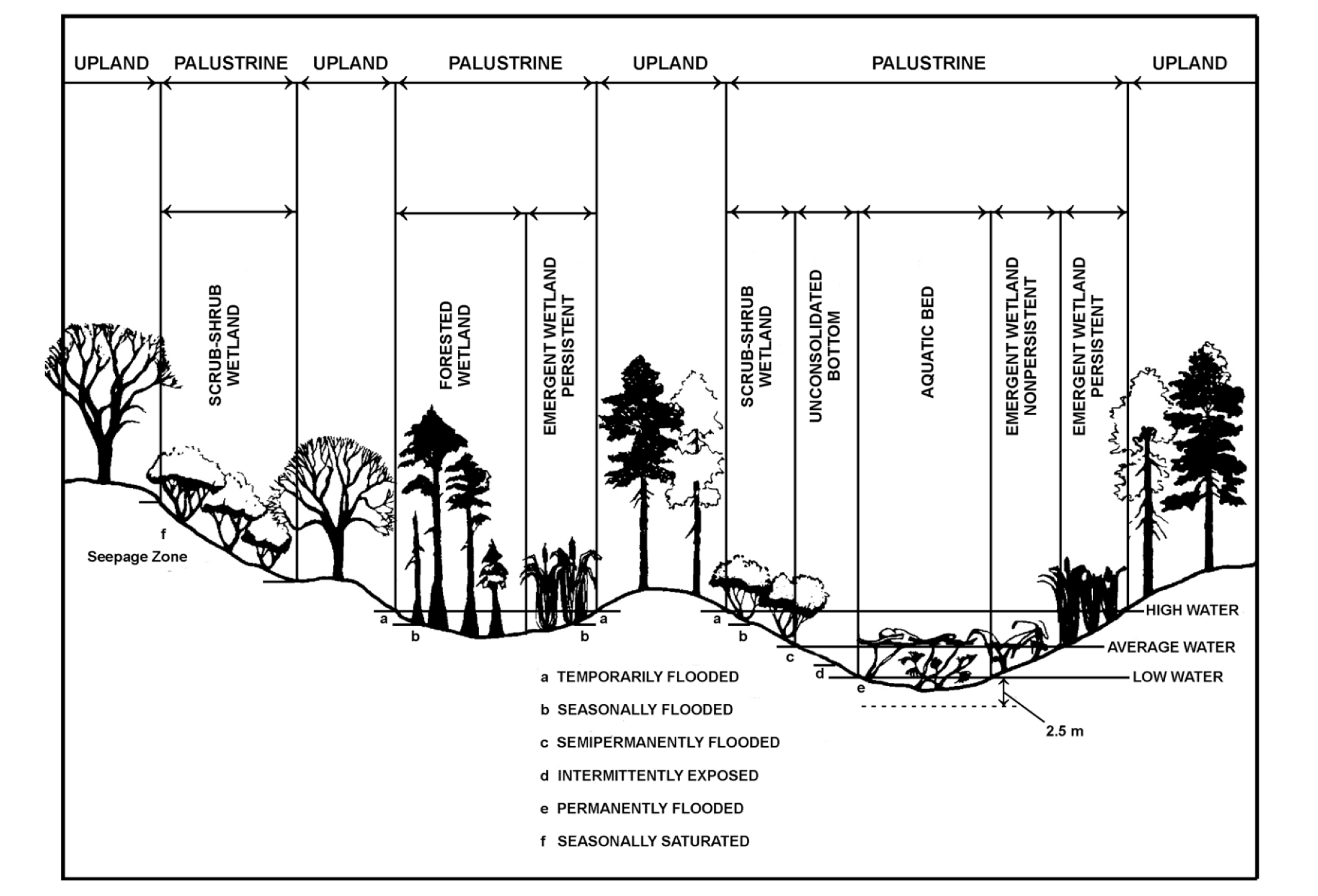
How terrain impacts wetlands. A glacier shaped the Black Swamp's terrain, which influenced wetlands, forests, prairies, and savannas.

The Black Swamp region developed rich biodiverse ecosystems, consisting of forested swamps, shrub swamps, emergent marshes, alkaline fens, sphagnum bogs, vernal pools, mixed oak forests, Northern hardwood forests, oak savannas, wet meadows, and prairie grasslands. Palustrine wetlands developed near lake shores, river channels, floodplains, isolated catchments, and slopes. Peat and decayed vegetation accumulated due to water-retaining clay, till, organic soil, and ice-created "kettle holes", which became wetland habitats for plants and wildlife.

The region's geo-botanical relationship has been documented by many researchers, including geologist Dr. Jane L. Forsyth. Her work illustrates how soil and elevation dictated vegetational mosaics: high sand dunes supported xeric oak savannas, while shallow bedrock with sand and clay surfaces fostered wet prairies and swamps. These contrasting conditions created a diverse landscape, encouraging wet and dry species to coexist (e.g., pin oak, chinquapin oak).

Prior to modern Anthropogenic climate change, the Black Swamp's paleoclimate was impacted by forces such as Milankovitch cycles, continental drift, and ocean currents. Proglacial lakes also impacted climate patterns, when winds interfaced with changing lake surfaces 14,200–10,500 YBP.

Pollen evidence from the Ohio and Indiana till plains suggests post-Younger Dryas warming turned the swamp region's boreal climate into a temperate climate about 11,000 YBP. Climate warming caused temperate deciduous forests to replace postglacial vegetation and open spruce forest-tundra. Deciduous trees supplanted conifer trees in the till plains by 9,800 YBP, and open oak woodlands developed 8,000–4,000 YBP. Conifers (e.g., tamarack, red cedar) persisted to the 19th century on the Fort Wayne Moraine in Allen, Williams, and Lenawee counties. Conifers grew in low-lying swamps with muck, sphagnum and other mosses, and acid-tolerant vegetation such as pitcher plants and marsh marigolds.

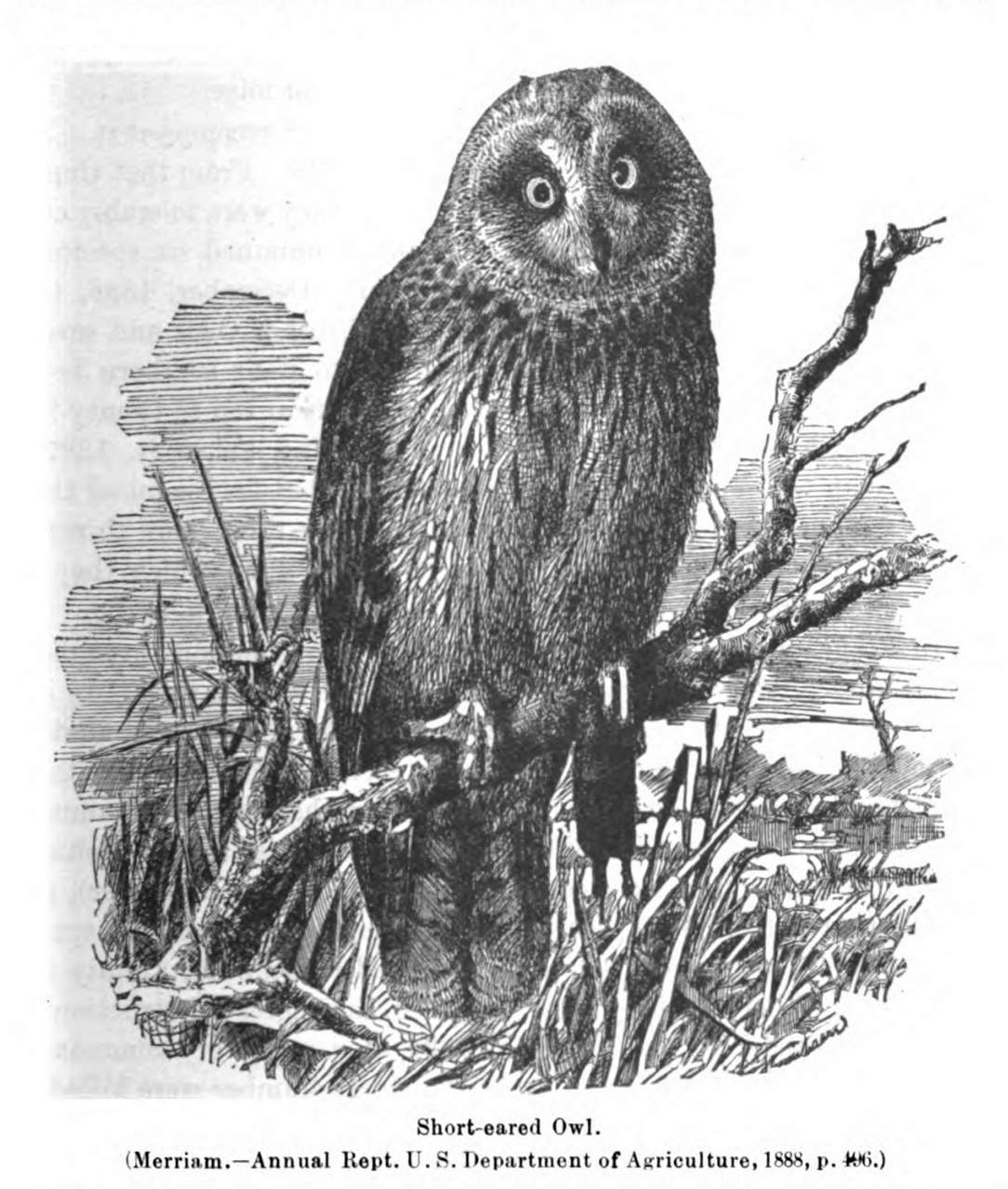
The short-eared owl used the Black Swamp's wetlands for hunting and breeding.

Hardwood swamps occurred in poorly drained depressions, till plains, glacial outwash plains and channels, end moraines, and perched dunes. Soils were acidic to alkaline loam (with silt, sand, or clay) and muck. Minerotrophic swamps and marshes existed with ombrotrophic peatlands. Pit-and-mound topography fostered diverse forests and wetlands. Surface water and groundwater dynamics (often altered by beaver dams) influenced biogeochemical cycles and the diversity of trees, shrubs, flowering, and aquatic/emergent plants. Wetland vegetation included rushes, sedges, and grasses. Trees and shrubs included blue ash, wahoo, and black cherry.

Wildlife was abundant in the swamp. Burrowing crayfish influenced hydrology, enhancing nutrient cycling and aerating wetland soils. Fish included pirate perch and lake sturgeon. Small mammals included porcupine, badger, and muskrat. Birds included ruffed grouse, short-eared owl, and golden eagle, and countless numbers of waterfowl and wading species. The swamp's extinct birds include Passenger pigeon and Carolina parakeet. Large mammals included deer and wolf. Bison existed until the 18th century along the Sandusky River and within the future town of Defiance, where they were observed to wallow in clay.

== Human history of the swamp ==
=== Indigenous nations of the Black Swamp region ===
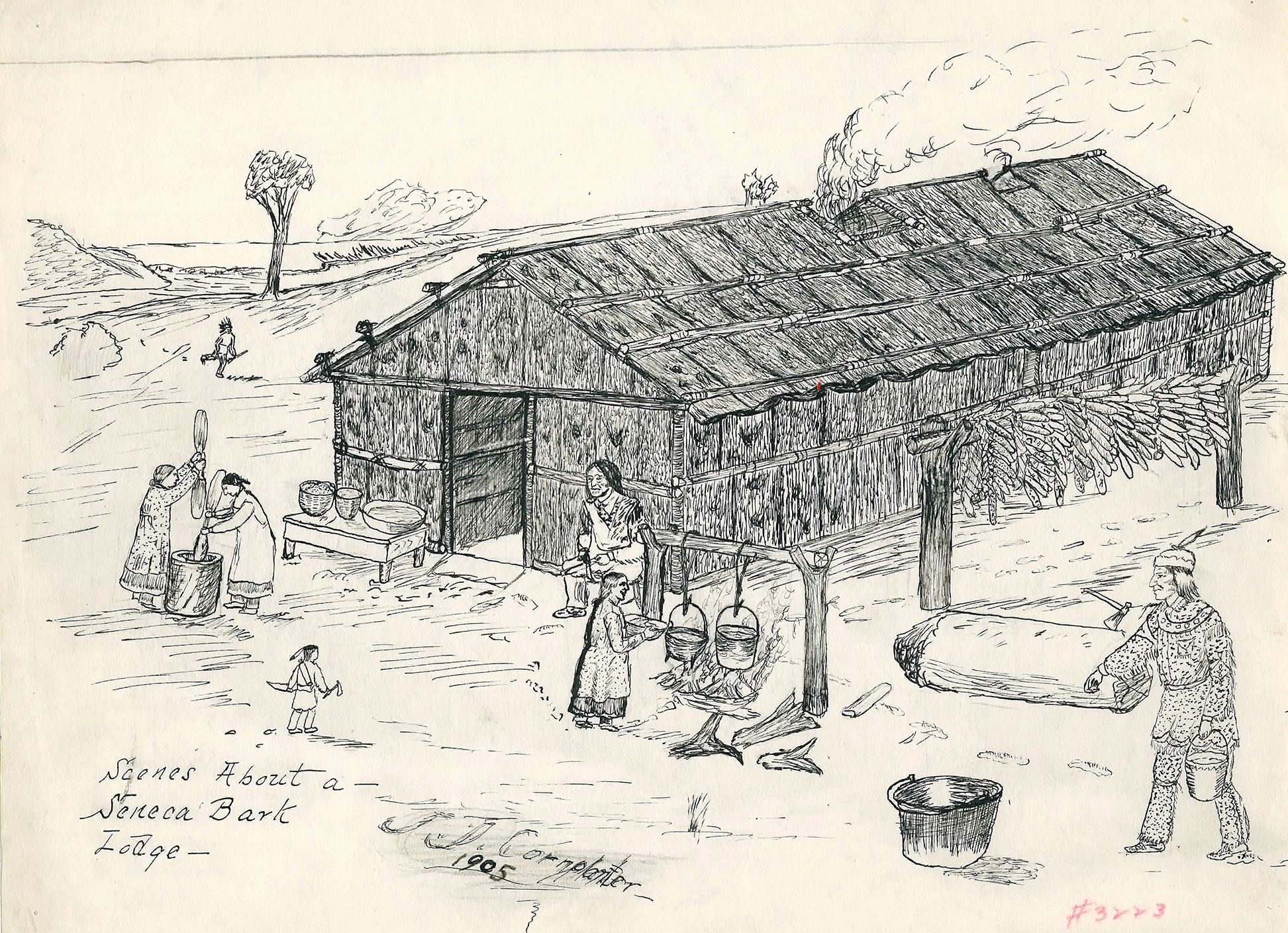
Jesse Cornplanter's 1905 drawing (New York State Library) illustrating traditional Haudenosaunee bark lodge architecture. The Seneca held recognized territorial rights in the Sandusky River basin along the eastern margin of the Black Swamp prior to 19th-century federal cessions.

Evidence in northern Ohio of the first Indigenous peoples, known as Paleo-Indians, date to around 11,000 YBP, according to studies of the Paleo Crossing Site and Nobles Pond Site. Evidence from 11,000 to 12,000 YBP of early humans was found at Sheriden Cave, east of the Black Swamp. A 2012 study suggests humans existed in northern Ohio 13,738 to 13,435 YBP, based on stone-tool cut marks on the bones of a Jefferson's ground sloth found in a bog near the swamp.

Indigenous cultures developed through the Archaic period (10,000 YBP), the Woodland period (3,000–1,000 YBP), and first contact with Europeans in Ohio Country. Early encounters with Europeans in the Black Swamp included the French explorer La Salle.

Studies of animal remains in refuse pits (middens) reveal Indigenous people hunted game in the swamp's Sandusky Bay section, including muskrats, ducks, frogs, turtles, and fish such as freshwater drum, longnose gar, yellow bullhead, and bluegill. Fish were speared with bone harpoons. An archeological site near the Maumee River in Allen County, Indiana, and dated 1150 to 1430 uncovered ceramic pottery; projectile points; stone tools; corn; animal bone; mussel shells; and charcoal from firewood, which originated from beech, ash, hickory, elm, walnut, maple, and white oak. Another Maumee River archaeological site in Lucas County, Ohio, yielded evidence of a late 18th to early 19th century Ottawa burial, which contained: trade goods; a shelter; an animal enclosure; Indigenous and European artifacts such as trade silver; and dietary evidence such as corn, fish, reptiles, and mollusks.

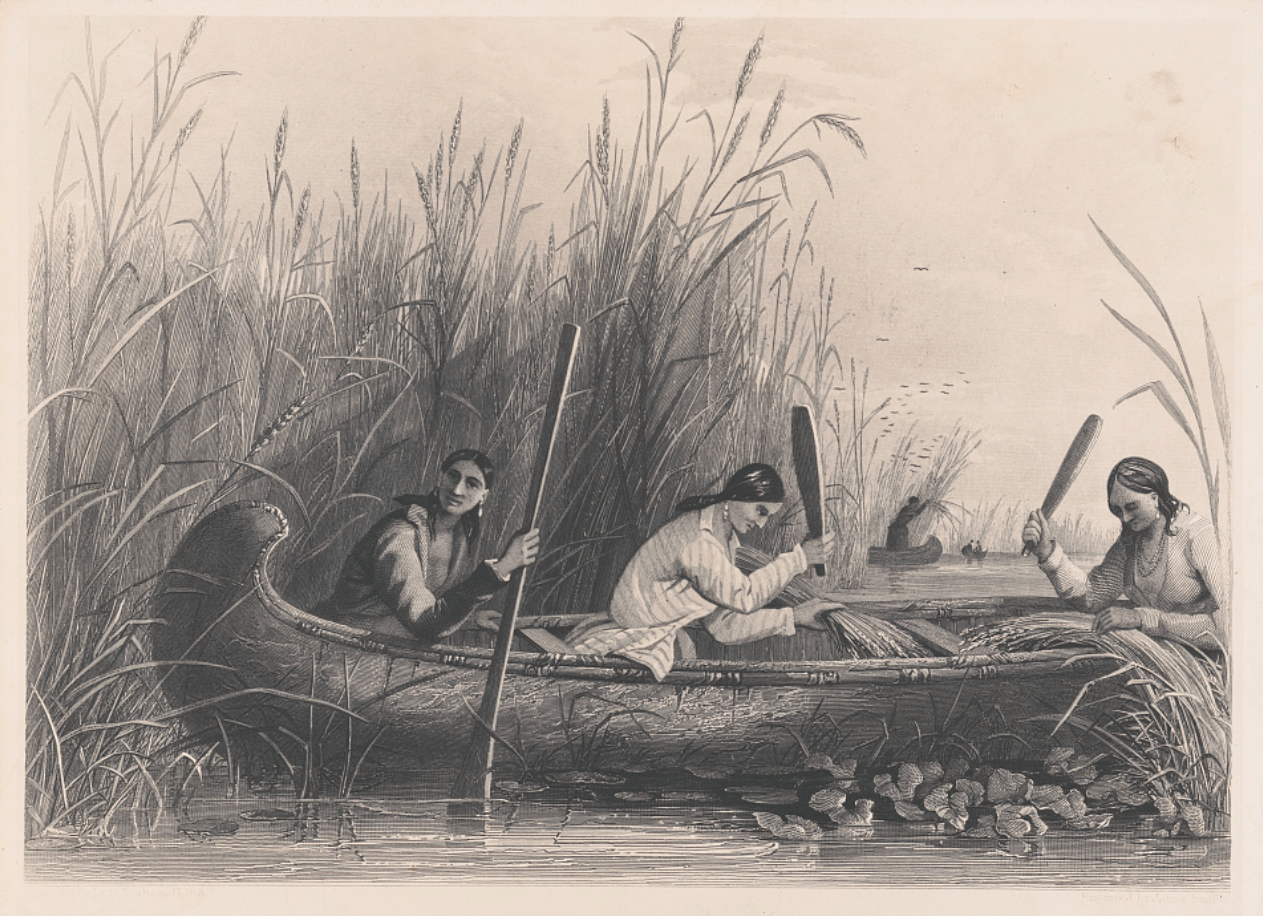
An 1853 engraving by Seth Eastman (Library of Congress) depicting wild rice harvesting by canoe. Prior to 19th-century clearance, shallow marsh margins across the Black Swamp provided natural habitats for wild rice gathering.

The Indigenous peoples of the Northeastern Woodlands lived in the Black Swamp region. Many of them spoke Algonquian and Iroquoian languages. As ancient Ohio's warming post-glacial climate changed the landscape, Indigenous nations adapted. They managed their lands around the swamp through seasonal migration, hunting, fishing, cultivating corn, and soil burning. Their traditional soil burns precede modern prescribed burns used for habitat management.

Indigenous nations harvested wild rice, a sensitive indicator of healthy freshwater marshes providing food and habitat for wildlife (e.g., deer, rabbits, muskrats, ducks). They viewed wild rice (manoomin) as sacred and an important part of their identity, livelihood, religion, culture, and traditions.

Following the introduction of horses in North America, Indigenous peoples use them in addition to 15 feet (4.6 m) long dugout canoes for transportation. More complex birchbark canoes were engineered for higher capacities; a 1750s account by frontiersman James Smith describes a vessel 35 feet (11 m) long, known in fur trade records as a "6-fathom gunwale length." Birchbark canoes featured birchbark skins sewn with tree roots over light wooden frames, providing the longitudinal strength necessary for high-speed travel under heavy loads. Two Smithsonian historians noted the birchbark canoes' advanced design and engineering indicate a long period of development must have taken place before European contact.

The Anishinaabe (including Ojibwe, Odawa, and Potawatomi) shared the swamp's hunting resources and trails with other nations, including the Miami. Within the swamp, the Shawnee settled along the Sandusky, Auglaize, and Maumee rivers. The Shawnee called the Maumee River Ot-ta-wa-se-poie; the Wyandot called it Cagh-a-ren-du-teie.

The Wyandot (Wendat, Huron) established villages at the mouths of the Maumee and Sandusky within the swamp, and along the Scioto and Ohio Rivers. After past wars with the Haudenosaunee (Iroquois), the Wyandot lived peacefully with the Delaware and Shawnee. They shared the swamp's lake coastline with the Ottawa and Ojibwe.

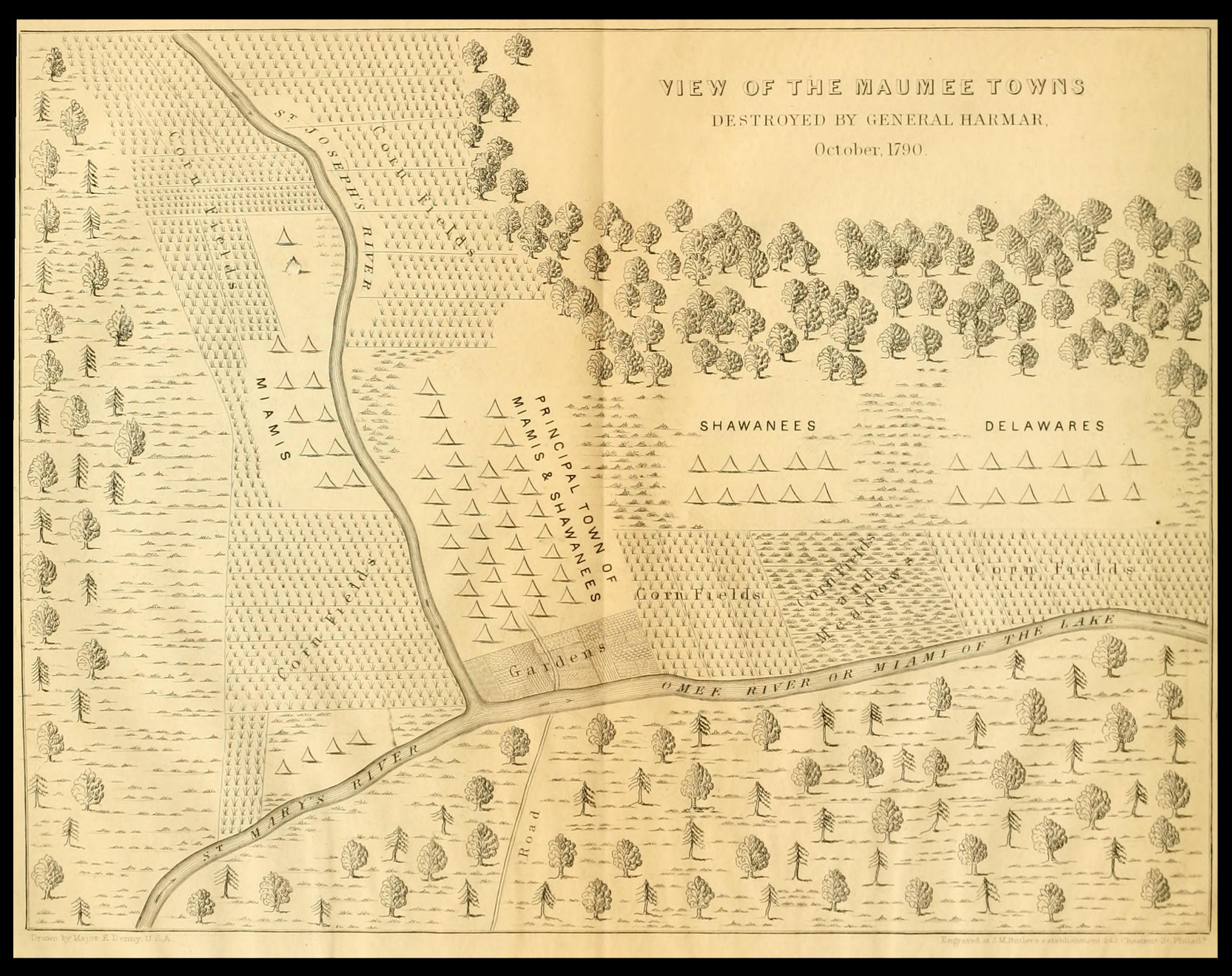
A map by Major Ebenezer Denny of Indigenous villages he witnessed destroyed by the U.S. military during the Harmar Campaign (1790). It shows how the Shawnee, Delaware, and Miami modified the Black Swamp's headwaters with agriculture.

Archaeologists have studied Indigenous earthworks within the swamp region, most of which exist in Fulton, Lucas, and Sandusky counties. Late-19th and early-20th century experts suggested they had military purposes; recent experts have suggested there is insufficient data to determine their true purpose.

The Potawatomi, Wea, Miami, and other Indigenous nations traveled the swamp's rivers for hunting, trade, and defense. They established villages at the swamp's headwaters — the confluence of the St. Joseph, St. Marys, and Maumee rivers in Indiana — to access the Great Lakes and northern territories. This network included the Miami town of Kekionga and the Shawnee town of Chillicothe.

Indigenous nations often fought French and British colonialists, who threatened their existence. The French and Indian War and Pontiac's War saw the swamp's Indigenous nations fail to stop European encroachment.

During the Northwest Indian War in the 1790s, Indigenous forces led by Little Turtle defended their villages in the Black Swamp (or Maumee) region from the U.S. military. In 1792, Gen. Wayne's troops noted Indigenous corn crops spanning the Maumee River from Fort Wayne to Lake Erie. In 1794, the U.S. military destroyed Shawnee corn fields and villages along the Maumee River in the swamp. They killed Indigenous people before they could find safety. These events foreshadowed the total destruction of the Black Swamp and the forced Indigenous removals from historic lands, which historians today debate as either ethnic cleansing or genocide.

=== Treaties for the swamp ===
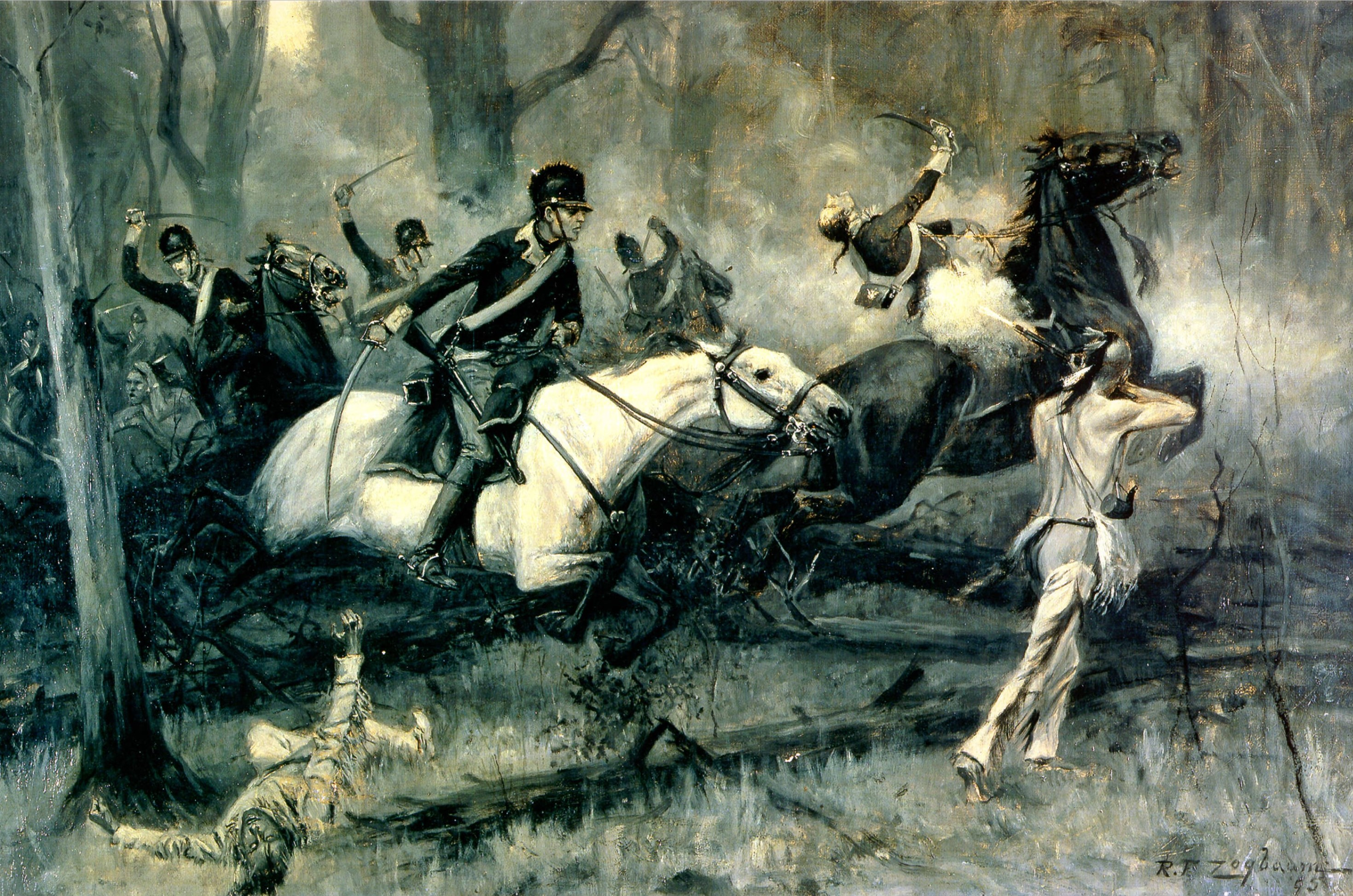
Charge of the Dragoons at Fallen Timbers by R.F. Zogbaum, 1895. It depicts the 1794 Battle of Fallen Timbers in the Black Swamp.

Following the American Revolutionary War, Congress established the Northwest Territory in 1787 during the Northwest Indian War. The 1794 Battle of Fallen Timbers in the Black Swamp led to the loss of Indigenous nations against the early United States.

The 1795 Treaty of Greenville reserved the entire region, including the swamp, for Indigenous control. However, the U.S. government systematically took these lands, including the swamp, for sale to White settlers through a series of treaties in the early 19th century.

The 1805 Treaty of Fort Industry ceded portions of the swamp in Erie, Lucas, and Monroe counties. The 1807 Treaty of Detroit took the swamp from the Maumee River to southeast Michigan.

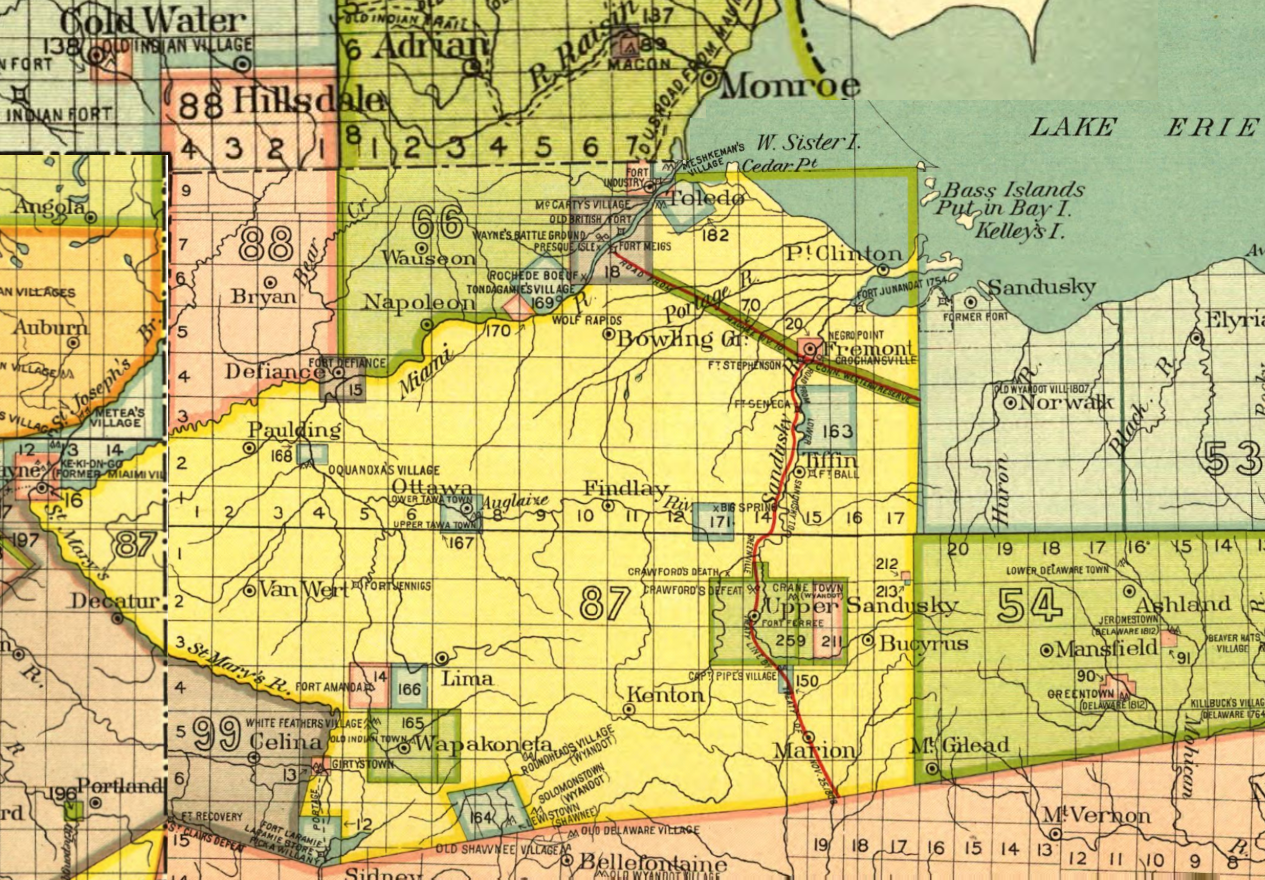
The Indian Land Cession maps of Indiana, Michigan, and Ohio. Most of the Black Swamp was sold in Cessions 53, 66, 87, and 88 between 1805 and 1817, and involved the Wyandot, Seneca, Delaware, Shawnee, Potawatomi, Odawa, Ojibwe, and Munsee. Other cessions on this map are visible by their number.

The 1808 Treaty of Brownstown took a narrow tract of the swamp from Perrysburg to Bellevue to build the Maumee Road Lands. Travel conditions on this muddy road were poor; horses and oxen sometimes sank halfway in the mud.

The swamp's impassibility factored into conflicts. The Black Swamp Mutiny of 1813 occurred when American soldiers got lost in the swamp en route to the Battle of the Thames. Even with a corduroy road, travel could take weeks; wheeled transport was often impossible most of the year. The Great Black Swamp's name originated during the War of 1812, possibly referencing its black soil, the way its trees blocked sunlight, or the terrain's challenges for military transport.

Shawnee leaders Tecumseh and Tenskwatawa formed a confederacy to resist American expansion. On September 29, 1812, the first Ohio battle of the War of 1812 took place in the Black Swamp between Americans and Tecumseh's Confederacy, ending in a draw on the Marblehead Peninsula in Sandusky Bay. Indigenous nations used the swamp to move covertly during wartime.

After the 1814 Treaty of Greenville, the 1817 Treaty of Fort Meigs took most of the swamp from its Indigenous nations. This treaty created small Indian reserves for the Wyandots, Senecas, Shawnees, and other original inhabitants, as well as Indigenous groups from other states, including Cayugas, Mohawks, and Oneidas.

=== Forced Indigenous removals and assimilation ===
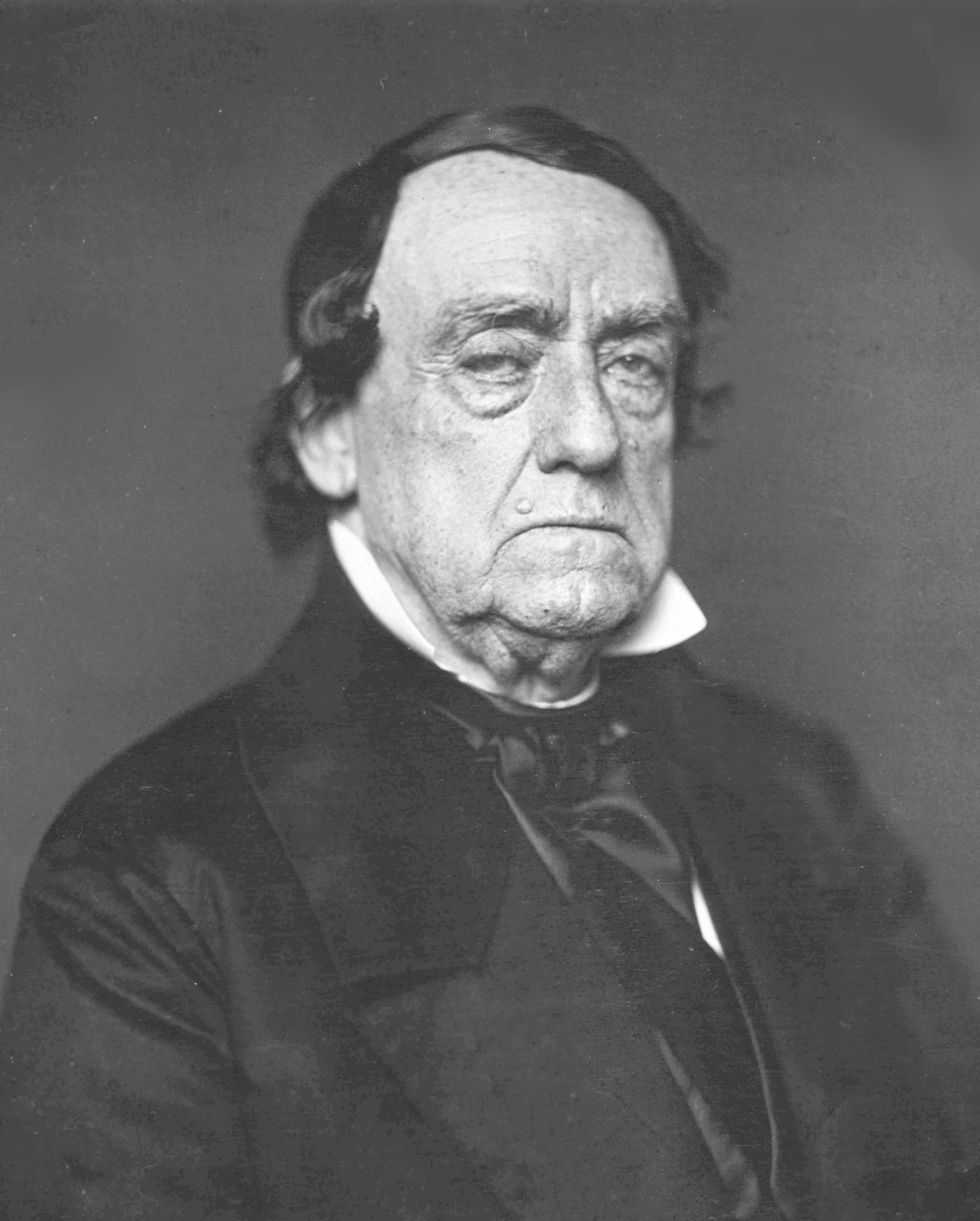
In 1818, Lewis Cass, territorial governor of Michigan, stated his interest to seizing northwest Ohio by force to develop it, even if it caused, he said, the "extinction" of the Indigenous peoples living there.

Before the term Manifest destiny was first used in 1845, the Indian Removal Act of 1830 enabled White settlers to violently remove Indigenous peoples from their lands. Through settler colonialism (including genocide and ethnic cleansing), settlers and the American government acquired land and resources in Ohio, Michigan, and Indiana, including midwestern wetlands like the Black Swamp. Anti-Indigenous racism was used to portray Indigenous people as "inferior" and as obstacles to conquest. The Seneca, whose settlements existed on the Sandusky River in the Black Swamp region, wrote in 1824 to President James Monroe, stating, "Whitemen passing through our Land often say this land is too good for Indians. We fear that we will soon be driven from this country unless you help us".

In addition to forced removals, American policies employed the forced assimilation of Indigenous peoples in the Black Swamp. Mission schools established in the swamp region were the precursors of American Indian boarding schools. Within the mission schools, Europeans and Americans believed they were on a "civilizing mission" to assimilate Indigenous peoples.

One Indian mission school existed in Fort Wayne (1820–1822), led by Baptist missionary Isaac McCoy. He taught Native students and baptized people in the Maumee. The 8 to 42 enrolled children were primarily Miami, Potawatomi, and Shawnee. A Christian missionary school existed in the Black Swamp region near Lower Sandusky (now Fremont, Sandusky County), where William Walker (Wyandot leader) attended as a child in the early 1800s. Presbyterian mission farms among the Wyandot were established within the Lower Sandusky Black Swamp area, led by missionaries including Rev. Joseph Badger.

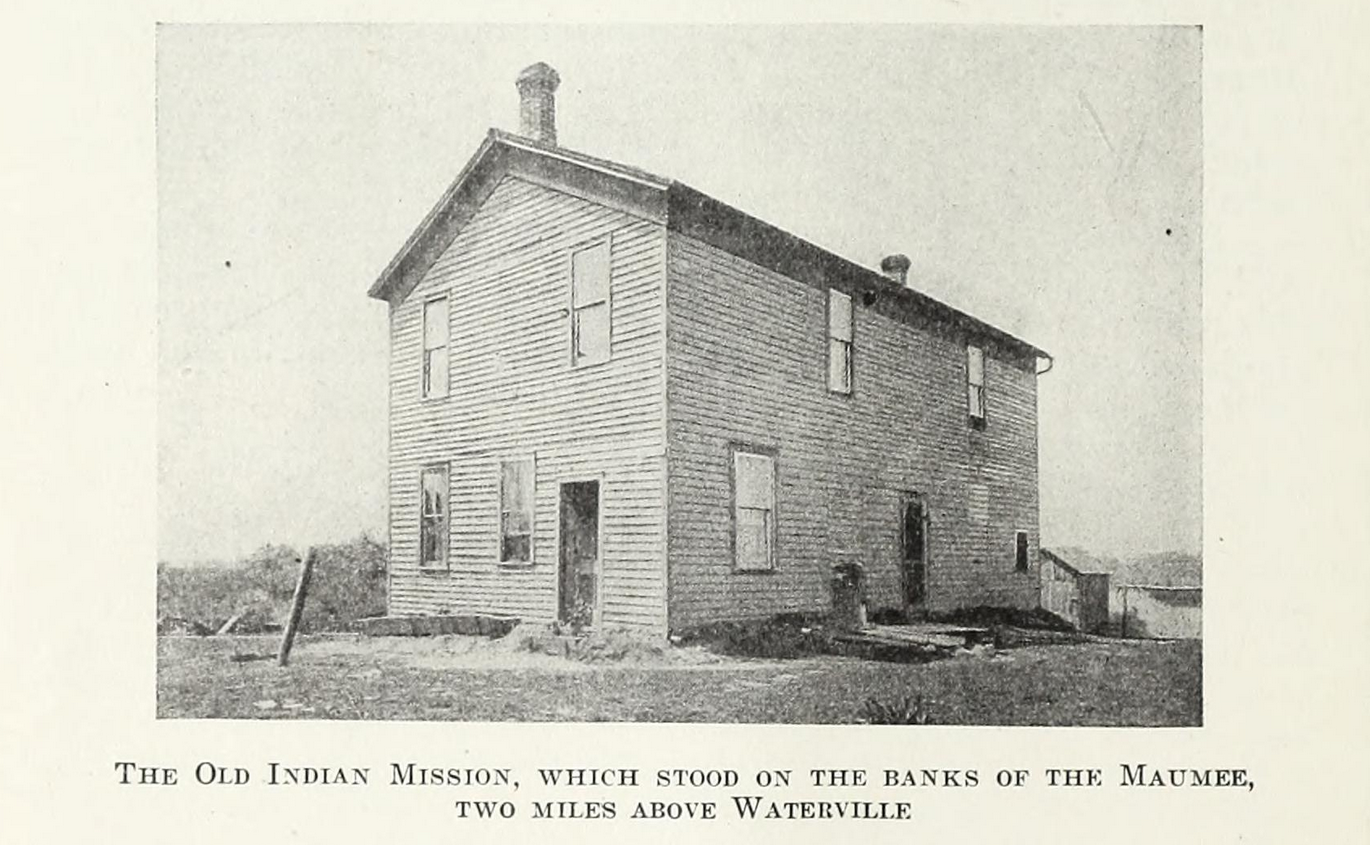
A late-19th century photo of the Maumee Mission School, where Rev. Isaac Van Tassel, his wife, Lucia, and teachers taught Native children (1822–1834) by the Maumee River.

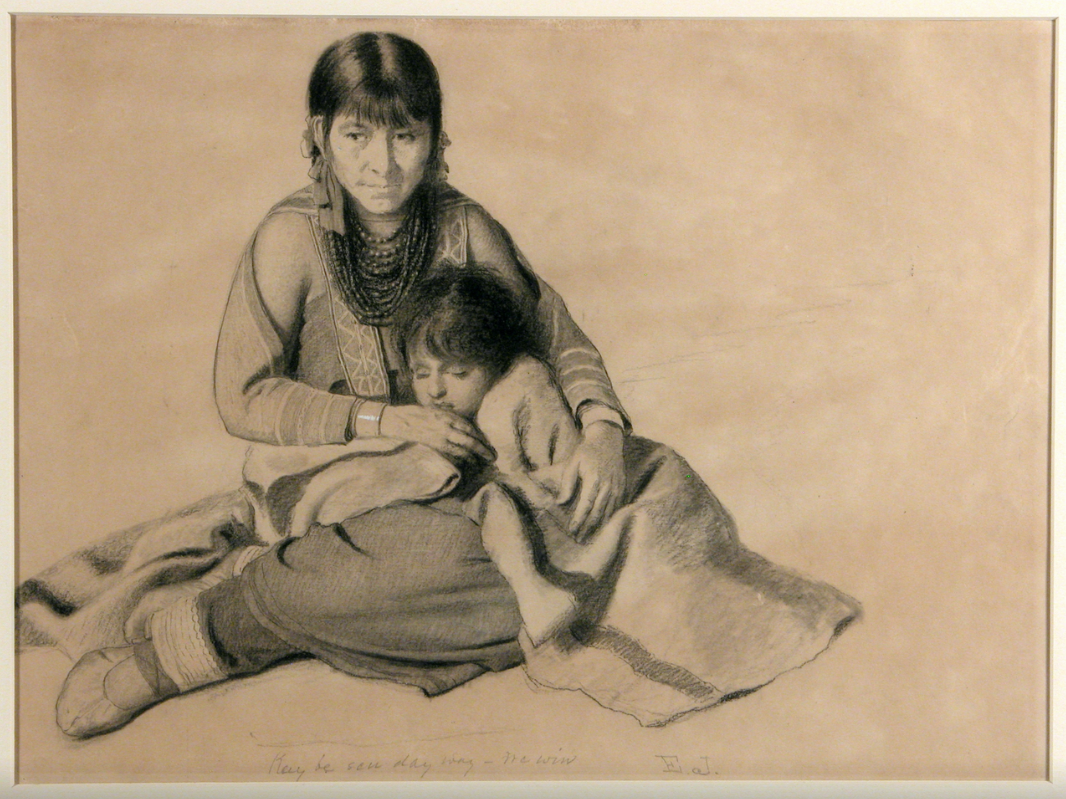
An 1857 drawing by Eastman Johnson showing an Ojibwe mother and child. Johnson's field sketches preserve primary visual records of traditional Indigenous child-rearing, contrasting with the cultural disruption of mission school assimilation and forced removals.

The Ebenezer Mission School (or Old Maumee Mission School) operated from 1822 to 1834 on the Maumee River in the Black Swamp of Wood County. Established by the Western Presbyterian Missionary Society of Pennsylvania, the school occupied Missionary Island and 372 acres (151 ha) on the Maumee River, and focused on "Christianizing and civilizing the Indians."

Rev. Isaac Van Tassel and his wife, Lucia, ran the complex, which included a two-story mission house, a schoolhouse, a blacksmith shop, and a livestock farm with assistants, teachers, and laborers. Students included Odawa, Ojibwe, Miami, Shawnee, Munsee, Wyandotte, and Potawatomi children. Missionaries also conducted outreach to elders in Indigenous territories and nearby White settlements.

The school enrolled from 80 to 150 Indigenous students aged 6 to 20. Activities included sports, sledding, making maple sugar, and the commercial harvesting of hickory nuts for eastern markets. Schoolwork covered the Bible, arithmetic, grammar, and geography. The Van Tassels studied Indigenous languages to produce translated spelling books with scriptures and hymns for Indigenous students.

The school had been developing a growing community. However, the U.S. government continued its policies of removing land from Indigenous peoples. The 1826 Treaty of Mississinewa ceded the swamp in Indiana north of the Maumee. The 1831 Treaty with the Ottawa ceded lands in what became Ottawa, Ohio. The 1832 Treaty with the Wyandot ceded lands north of what became Carey, Ohio, and the Springville Marsh State Nature Preserve. The 1833 Treaty with the Ottawa ceded lands around the future Toledo. This treaty completed American control of Lake Erie's Western Basin, known to the Ottawa as "Gitche Gumegsuwach" (Get-she-gum-eg-sug-wach).

Van Tassel had the Presbyterian Missionary Society donate 600 to 700 acres of his school's land to the Odawa so they could stay. Eventually, the school closed in April 1834 because the U.S. government forced Indigenous populations to move west of the Mississippi. The school is not listed as a boarding school by the Bureau of Indian Affairs.

Wyandot Chief Summundewat, who opposed the Indian Removals, and his travel companions were murdered in 1841 by two White thieves in the Black Swamp near Turkeyfoot Creek (Henry County). According to historian Mary Stockwell, this crime compelled the remaining Wyandots to sell their lands to the government in fear of settler encroachment. On March 17, 1842, the Wyandot Tribal Council signed a treaty with Special Commissioner John Johnston and sold all of their remaining lands in Michigan and 109,144 acres in the Ohio counties of Wyandot and Crawford. In 1842, Charles Dickens, who was traveling through the U.S. at that time, met with the last of the Wyandot people in Ohio, and with Johnston himself, who had just negotiated the treaty. Dickens wrote about this encounter in his book, American Notes.

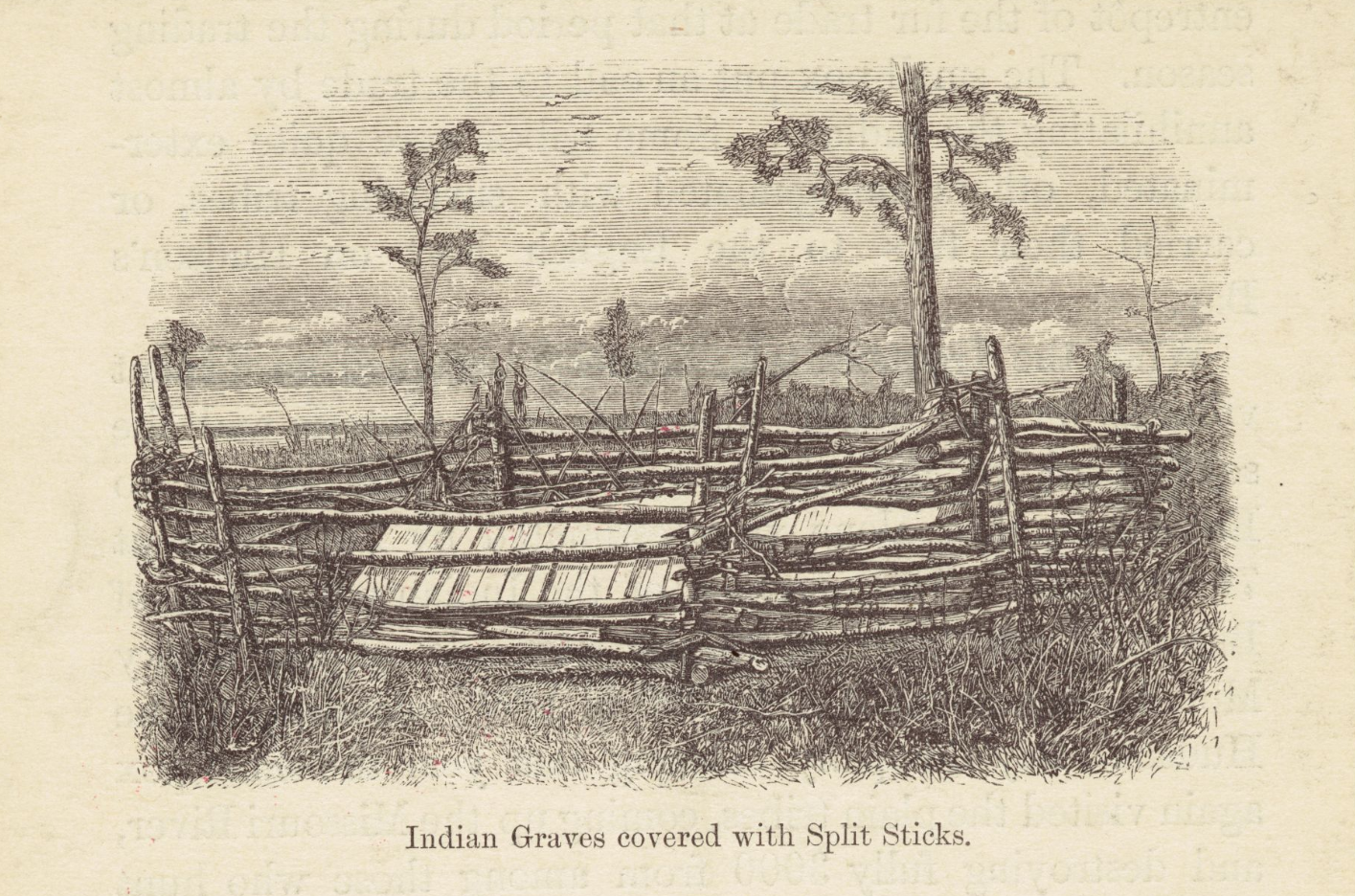
An illustration (1857–1859) by artist and surveyor John Arnot Fleming, based on his observations of Indigenous graves. The Wyandot (Wendat, Huron) buried their dead through various rituals in graves called Oi-go-sa-yé.

Dickens listened to Johnston, who spoke to him about the Wyandot, and gave him "a moving account of their strong attachment to the familiar scenes of their infancy, and in particular to the burial-places of their kindred; and of their great reluctance to leave them". Burial grounds in the Wyandot (Wendat, Huron) language were called Oi-go-sa-yé.

By 1843, the Indian removals in Ohio completely forced out the many Indigenous peoples whose ancestors had called the Great Black Swamp region home for thousands of years, including the Wyandot, Seneca people, Delaware, Shawnee, Potawatomi, Odawa, Ojibwe, Miami, Eel River, Wea, Kickapoo, Piankeshaw, and Kaskaskia. The Removals also forced out the Peoria and the Munsee, who had a presence in the area.

During the removals, U.S. government agents assured the tribes that the President said they would always own the land they would be moved to out West in Indian Territory. Records indicate an agent was told by a Wyandot chief:

He promised the same thing to us at our last treaty; that if we would sell all but this reservation, he would protect us from the encroachments of the whites, and keep us in peace, and never ask us to sell another foot of our land. This was not ten years ago; and now you are at your old trade of trying to drive us away again. Besides, it would be no better if we were yonder; for there is no land or swamp so poor, but white men will want it; and if the President did not fulfill his word here, will he do it yonder? No! You white men never will be satisfied till the blue water of the great lakes, in which the sun sets, has drank the last drop of Indian blood. Here are our homes; and we are now beginning to live comfortably… Here, too, are the graves and bones of our fathers, our wives, and our children.

=== Land surveys ===
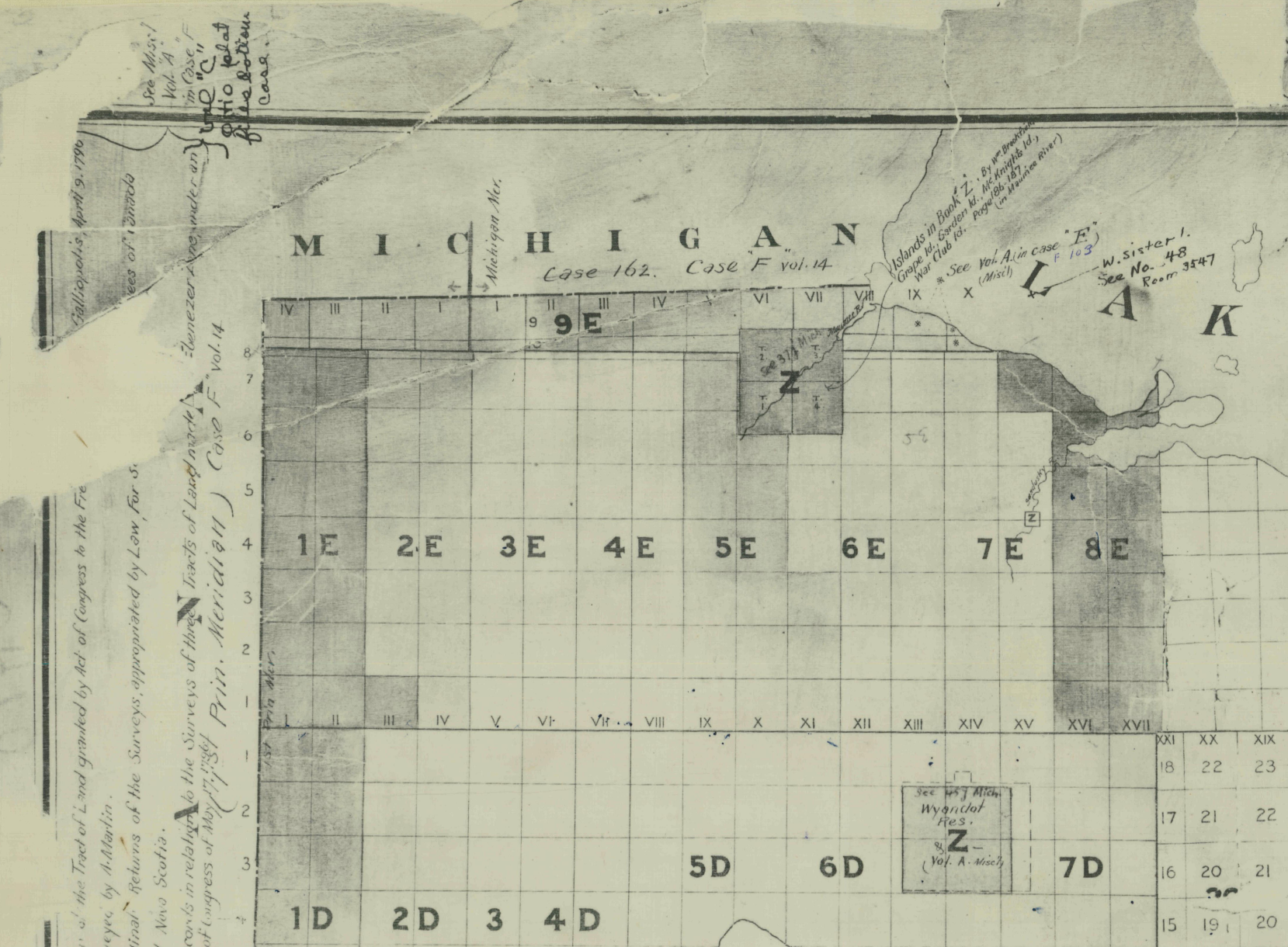
A PLSS index survey map of northwest Ohio, created after 1817. It shows the land purchased through the Treaty of Fort Meigs, leaving only a few Indigenous reservations. Land was sectioned into townships. Individual parcels were sold to settlers.

Following the Land Ordinance of 1785, the General Land Office (GLO), established in 1812, managed the Public Land Survey System's surveying and platting. To sell the Ohio Lands, GLO surveyors recorded detailed landscape observations. From 1816 to 1856, they assessed the agricultural potential of soils, noted the quantity and quality of timber (including tree species and diameter), and recorded locations of wetlands and streams, burned areas, beaver floodings, and Indigenous or early-settler cultural sites.

Survey records were vulnerable to losses or fires in the 19th century. Surviving records, once used to sell land to 19th-century settlers, now help researchers identify environments that existed over 200 years ago. GIS presettlement vegetation maps, based on survey records, show the Black Swamp's full extent across Indiana, Ohio, and Michigan. They follow the work of Dr. Paul Sears, Dr. Edgar Nelson Transeau, and Dr. Robert B. Gordon, who created the first presettlement vegetation map in 1966. In 2025, the Ohio Department of Natural Resources (Ohio DNR) began building a new, more detailed Ohio presettlement vegetation map.

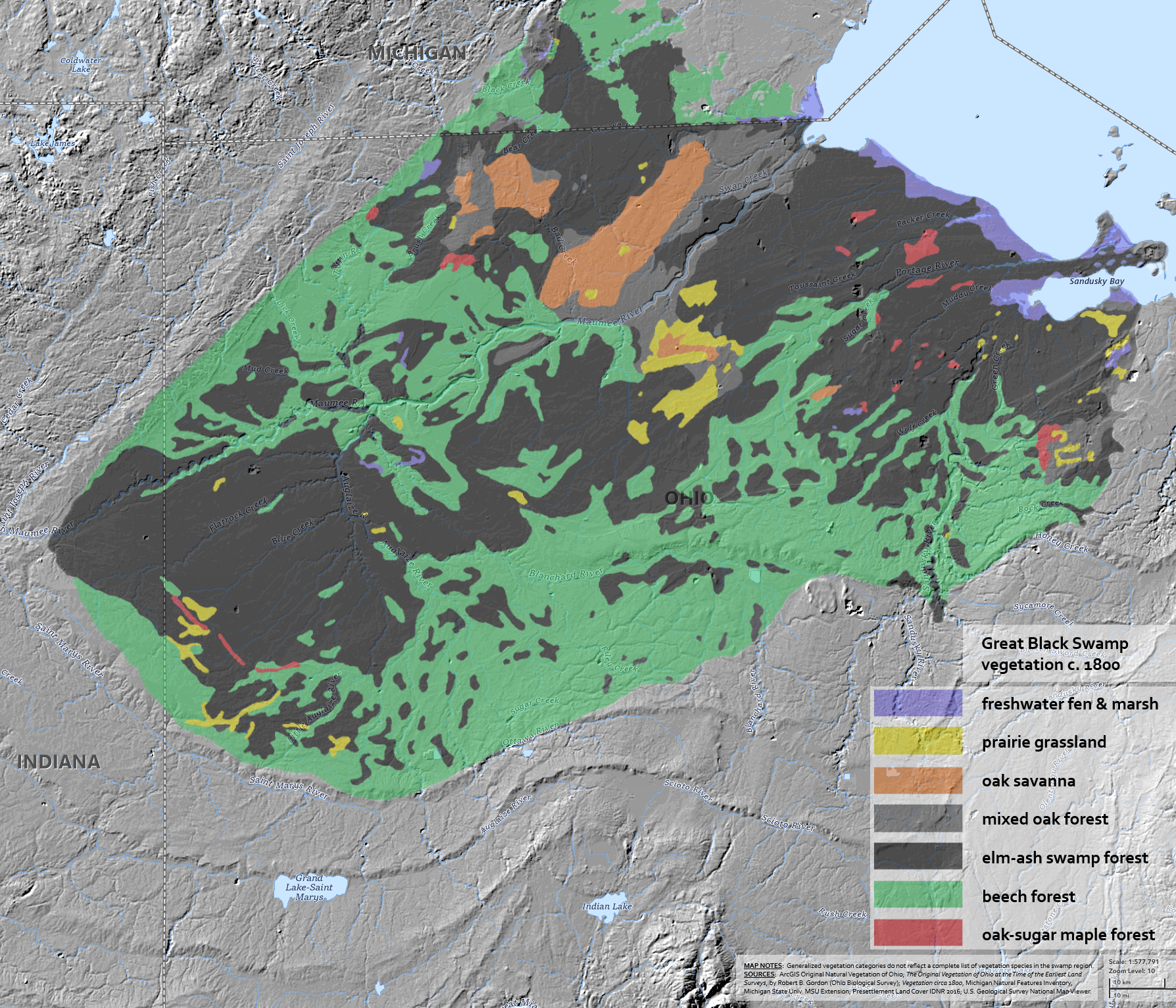
A Lidar-based DEM rendition of the Great Black Swamp region's outline, based on presettlement vegetation maps. It depicts the 3.3 million acres estimated by the Ohio DNR (1988), excluding environments outside the till plains and Fort Wayne Moraine, and Monroe County's shoreline wetlands. Precipitation expanded wetland borders into dry forests and prairies.

GIS presettlement vegetation maps show the Black Swamp was not uniform, but a composition of varied wetland fragments shaped by elevation and terrain. Its outline was defined by three large continuous wetland fragments:

- Western/Central Fragment: ≥ 850,000 acres (340,000 ha), starting near New Haven, IN, and ending near New Rochester, OH.
- Eastern Fragment: ≥ 630,700 acres (255,200 ha), extending from Fostoria and Bowling Green to Lake Erie.
- Northern Fragment: ≥ 272,700 acres (110,400 ha), located north of the Maumee River from Liberty Center, OH, and extending into Palmyra Township, MI.

Due to variances in cartographic methodology and the inclusion criteria for dry uplands, the estimated swamp size can range from 1.5 million acres (607,028 ha) up to the Ohio DNR's estimation of over 3.3 million acres (1,335,463 ha). Outliers potentially missed by early-19th century surveyors measuring wetlands was how seasonal precipitation expanded the swamp's borders, turning dry forests into flooded forests, dry prairies into wet prairies, and other dry areas into vernal pools.

Increased water levels improved canoe navigation. Dry conditions contracted wetlands. In 1838, drought devastated the swamp. One historian described how wildlife — from deer to frogs — migrated across towns searching for water, how wetlands dried up, "their bottoms cracked open from shrinking", and how every tree within the swamp died.

The swamp in Michigan was often called "Cottonwood Swamp", due to its large cottonwoods measuring 6–9 feet (1.8–2.7 m) in diameter. It was also called the "Black Swamp" in Michigan. Its extent from Michigan into Fulton and Lucas counties, Ohio, was simply called the "Black Swamp".

Historians have arbitrarily suggested the Great Black Swamp's boundaries were only south of the Maumee River and also in Allen County, Indiana, and Defiance County, Ohio, denying the swamp's true extent in Lucas, Fulton, Henry, Lenawee, and Monroe counties. Historian Bruce E. McGarvey acknowledged the swamp's true extent north of the Maumee, correcting misinformation from previous historians. Geological and survey data conclusively show the swamp extended into Michigan.

Presettlement vegetation and DEM mapping validate 19th-century observations of the swamp's extent across eighteen counties in Indiana, Ohio, and Michigan, including Williams and Erie counties. Map data indicates landforms isolated certain wetlands from the swamp. The data contradicts historic claims of the swamp's reach into Crawford, Darke, Mercer, Auglaize, and Wyandot counties.

Land survey data contradicts reports that suggest the Black Swamp extended into Detroit. Historical records indicate the lakeshore wetlands between Toledo and Detroit were called the Monroe Marshes (Monroe County) and Pointe Mouillee Marshes (Wayne County), not the Black Swamp.

GIS presettlement vegetation maps indicate Charles Dickens did not travel through the Black Swamp during his 1842 stagecoach trip from Columbus to Upper Sandusky, despite popular claims to the contrary. Dickens famously described the bone-jarring jolts of a corduroy road during this segment of his journey. However, the episode occurred outside the swamp's boundaries. According to accounts from both Dickens and his secretary, G.W. Putnam, Dickens left Upper Sandusky by stagecoach for Tiffin, where only then did he travel through the Black Swamp by train to visit Sandusky.

=== Drainage and settlement ===
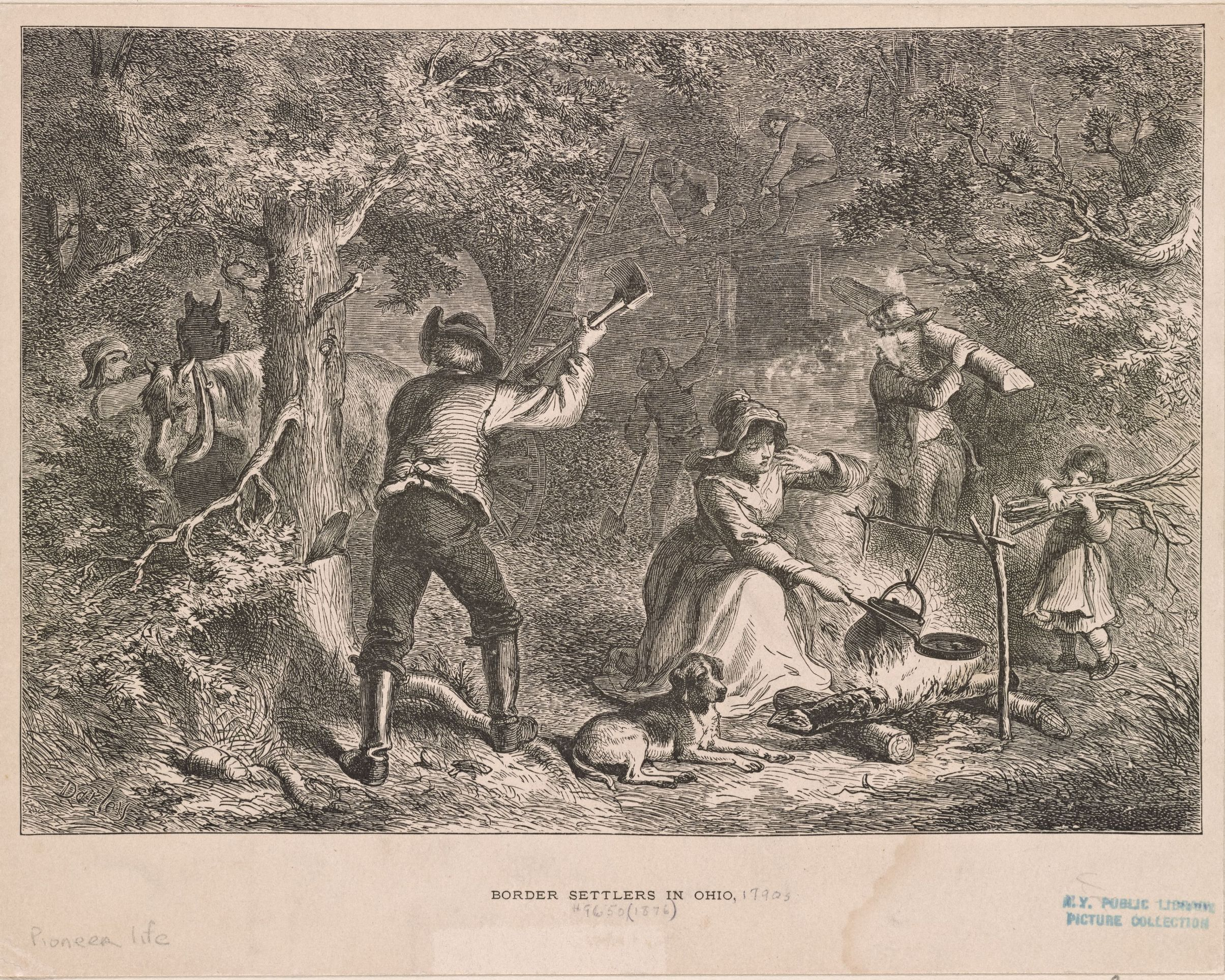
Settlers felled trees to build homes, sell timber, and drain wetlands.

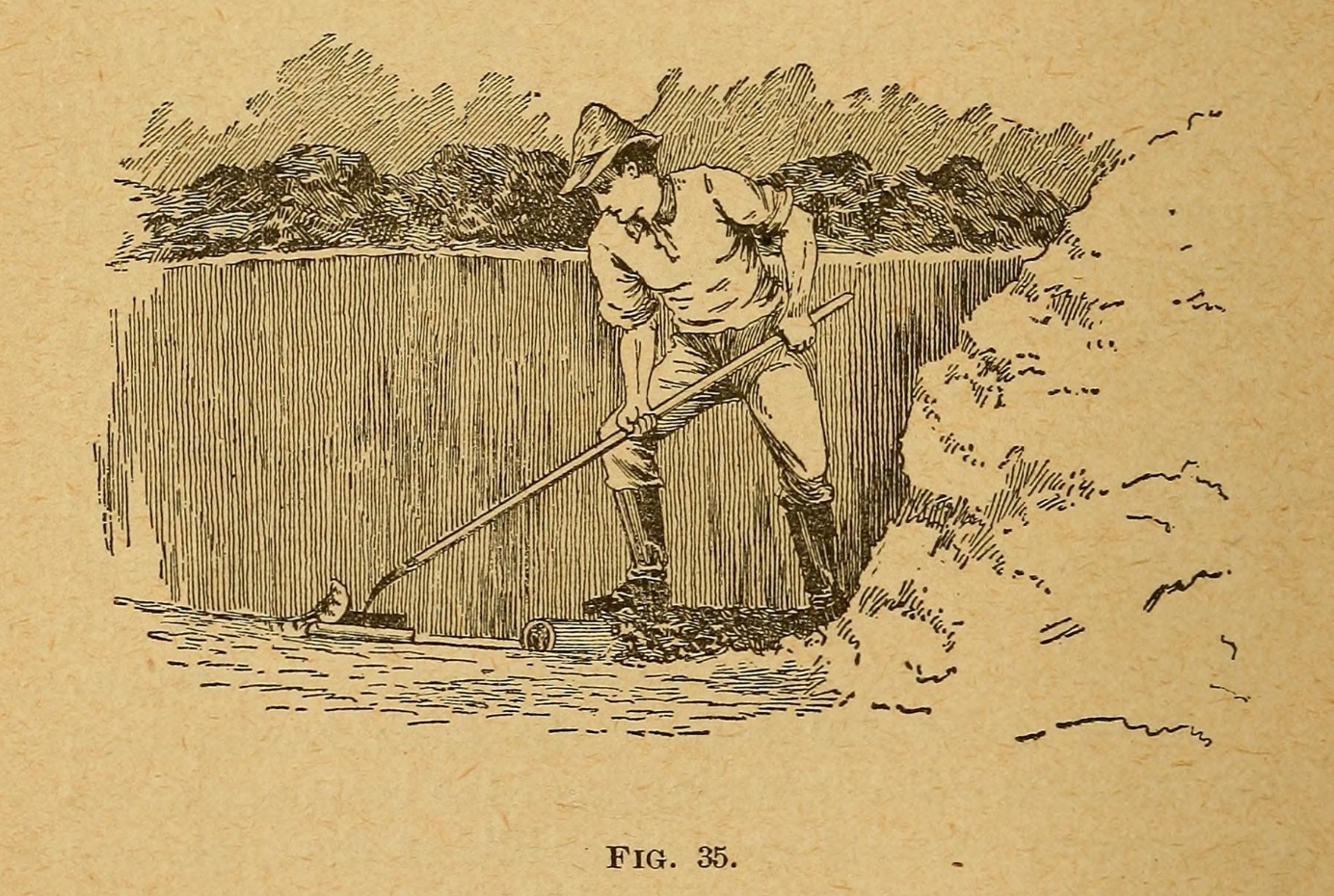
Tiles laid 3 to 4 feet deep, visible beneath the person's foot, lowered the water table. Water drained into ditches, allowing crop growth.

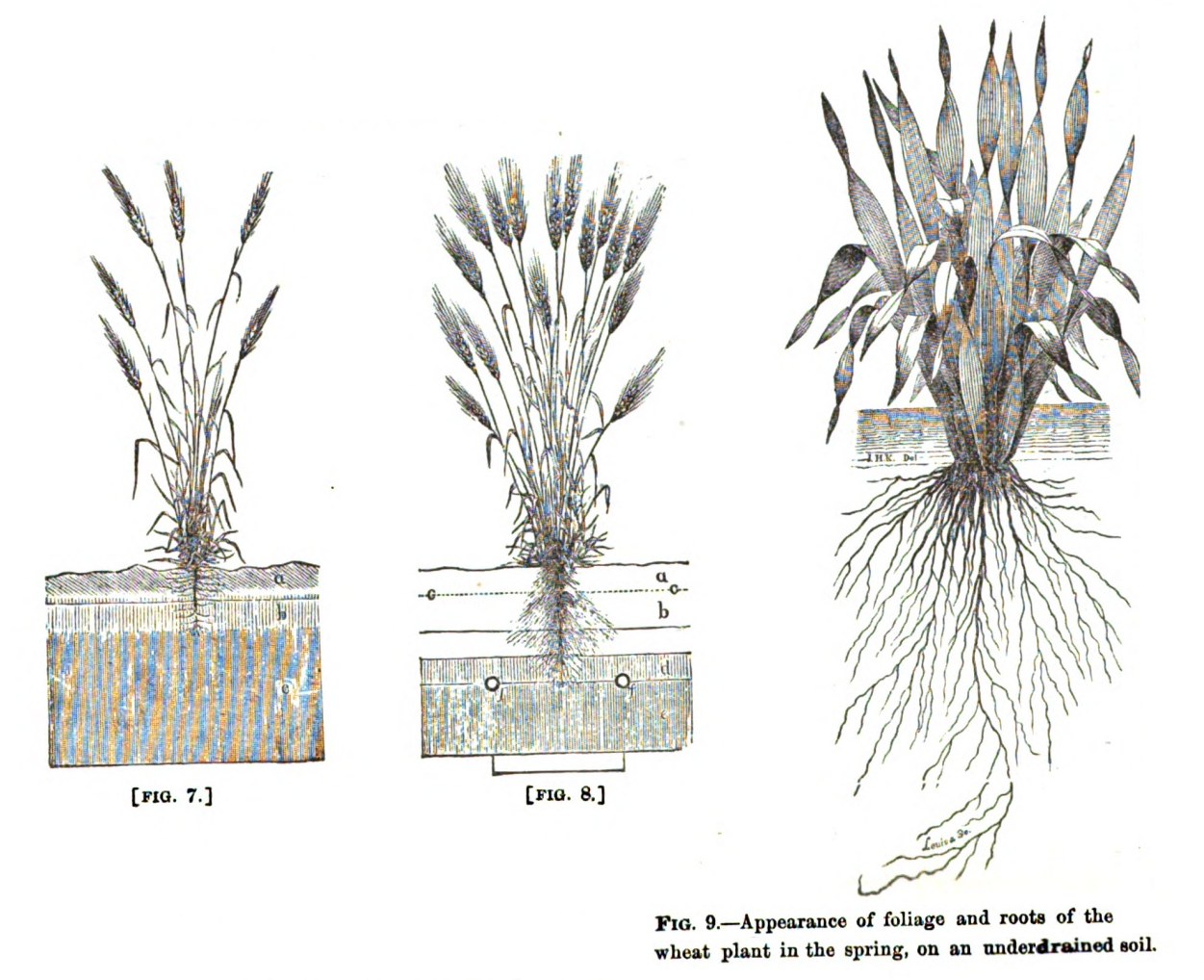
How wheat grows in undrained to drained soils. Crop roots cannot grow in waterlogged, clay soils.

Following the forced removals of the Indigenous populations, White American settlement accompanied the Great Black Swamp's drainage. Dry uplands were settled early, but the swamp's muddy terrain delayed development for decades. During the 1835–36 Toledo War, militias could not engage in the wetlands. People could walk across the swamp with ease when it was frozen hard in winter.

The Land Act of 1820 reduced the minimum land price from $2.00 to $1.25 per acre, incentivizing settlement within the Congress Lands and survey townships.

Wetland drainage accelerated following the federal Swamp Land Act of 1850 and subsequent state legislation, including an 1853 Ohio drainage law and the 1859 Ohio Ditch Law. After the Maumee Valley generated over 9 million crop bushels in 1859, new drainage projects encouraged higher productivity gains.

By spade and shovel, settlers hand-dug deep ditches, which lowered the water table, then buried clay tiles (pipes made from local clay), which drained excess water into ditches. Historian Henry Howe described the soils as a foot of "black decaying matter" over several feet of "rich yellow clay", followed by a "stratum of black clay of great depth."

Pioneer churches in the Black Swamp region included United Brethren and Methodist; schoolhouses were also established. Settlers built their homes on river banks and sand ridges. They often made their homes out of logs, and hunted game in the swamp for food, and for skins and furs to make clothing and other items. They also caught large quantities of fish in the Sandusky and Maumee Rivers. In open wet prairies without trees, water could be 4 feet (1.2 m) deep, going up to a horse's saddle skirt. In other places, the land was under 2 feet (0.61 m) of water because the creeks were flooded by beaver dams, which took years for settlers to remove.

Agricultural and geological surveys identified diverse vegetation, ranging from small species including Miami mist and pale touch-me-not to larger species including flowering dogwood and Kentucky coffeetree. These inventories primarily assessed timber market value and tracked drainage progress by monitoring the decline of wetland plants. Specific regional accounts included 32 plant species in Putnam County and 55 tree species in Monroe County.

Settlers saw the swamp as "primeval forest". Historian Martin Kaatz wrote about early-19th century accounts of how 100 ft (30 m) trees "nearly shut out the sun's rays except during the period of high sun". Howe described the swamp's dense foliage was "almost impenetrable to the rays of the sun". Geologist W.W. Mather noted the swamp's "gloomy silence".

=== "Confused speculation": Public health crises in the swamp ===
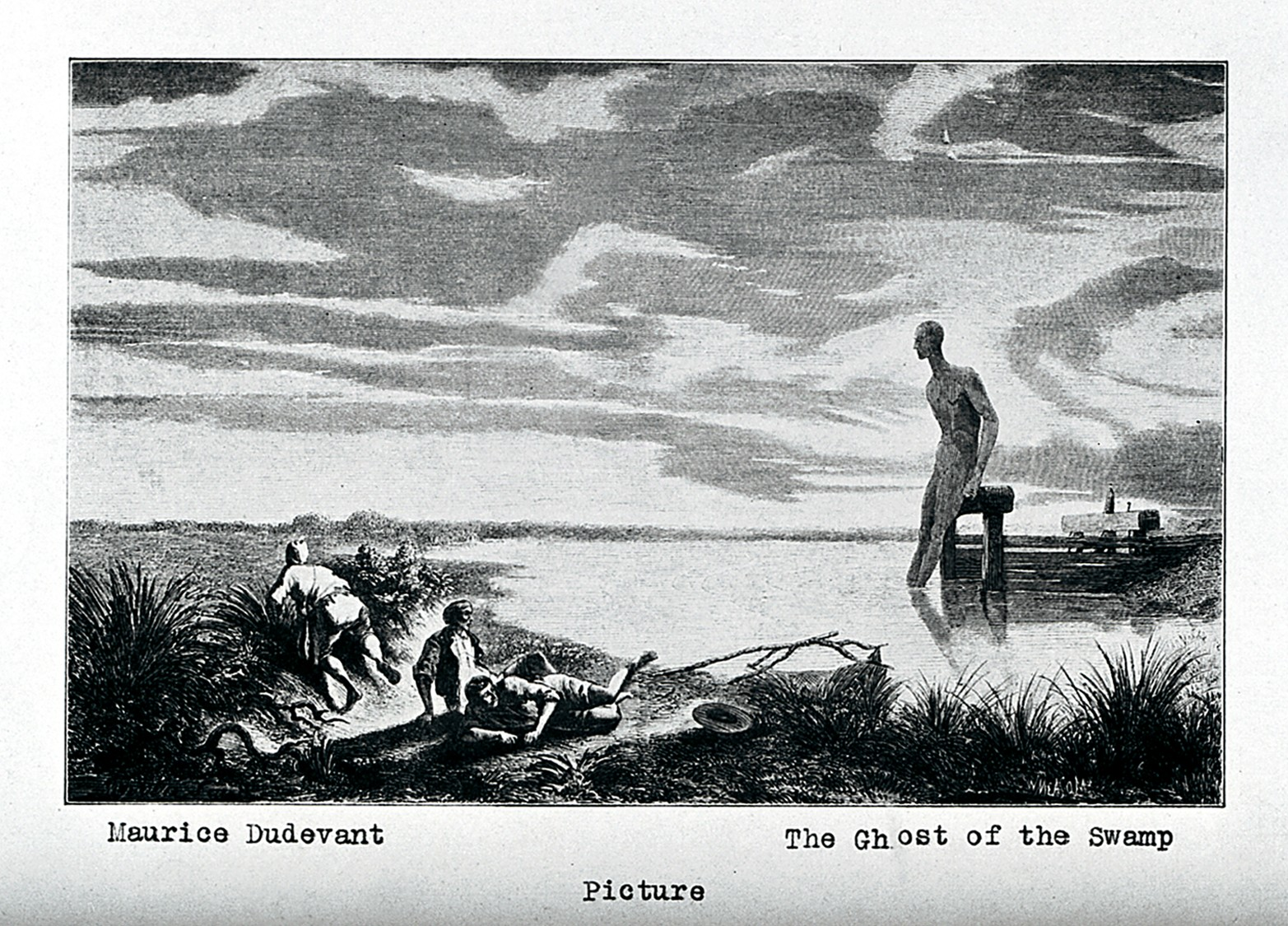
The Ghost of the Swamp by Maurice Sand (or Maurice Dudevant), 1850. The illustration is an allegory for malaria. Its mortality and infection rates in the Great Black Swamp are unknown, due to ignorance and unreliable medical information and treatment in the mid-19th century.

During drainage, lethal epidemics of unknown cause sparked widespread panic among settlers, though their symptoms were recorded in medical journals. An Ohio public health official in the 1940s commented on the general ignorance in Ohio about diseases and epidemics between 1788 and 1873, describing it as "confused speculation".

Malaria was deadly in the swamp, yet settlers were unaware that mosquitoes, not "bad air", transmitted it until Charles Louis Alphonse Laveran's discovery of plasmodium in 1880. "Confused speculation" led to common misdiagnosis, leaving the exact number of malaria deaths in the swamp unknown. Even the 1870 U.S. census noted the lack of sufficient death records as the "gross incompleteness of the Returns of Deaths". The census mapped a high proportion of malaria deaths in northwest Ohio.

Dr. Daniel Drake educated local communities on epidemic prevention. However, he mistakenly blamed the Black Swamp for "autumnal fevers" without knowing the true cause of malaria.

Settlers often blamed the swamp itself for every death, infection, and injury, leading many to call the City of Toledo and the Great Black Swamp, "The Graveyard of the Midwest". One incident in particular involved the town of Gilboa in 1852, located next to the swamp. A cholera outbreak caused nearly 600 people to flee the town in fear and terror, and 13 people were reported killed by the disease. It was later determined that a damp cellar that stored trash and decomposing vegetable matter was the source of the outbreak.

However, while wetlands and migrating waterfowl are contamination vectors for diseases like cholera, caused by the bacteria Vibrio cholerae, and also Pasteurella multocida, or avian cholera, it is ultimately the lack of human hygiene and sanitation that lead to cholera epidemics. During the War of 1812, soldiers at Fort Meigs became ill by drinking water from the Black Swamp. An 1820 account noted people sometimes drank water from "filthy ponds" and "puddles in the road" in northwest Ohio.

Indigenous populations suffered significant losses not from the swamp they had lived with for over 13,000 years, but from disease endemics newly introduced by European and American settlers. Diseases like smallpox decimated Indigenous communities, killing an estimated 90% of all Indigenous peoples across the Western Hemisphere. European germ warfare also caused Indigenous population declines.

By the 1860s and 1870s, germ theory became more widely accepted as the cause for diseases, thanks to its key advocates. Public health improved in 1886, when Ohio's government created a State Board of Health to educate the public, prevent the spread of infections and diseases, and end the era of "confused speculation".

=== The Underground Railroad in the Great Black Swamp ===
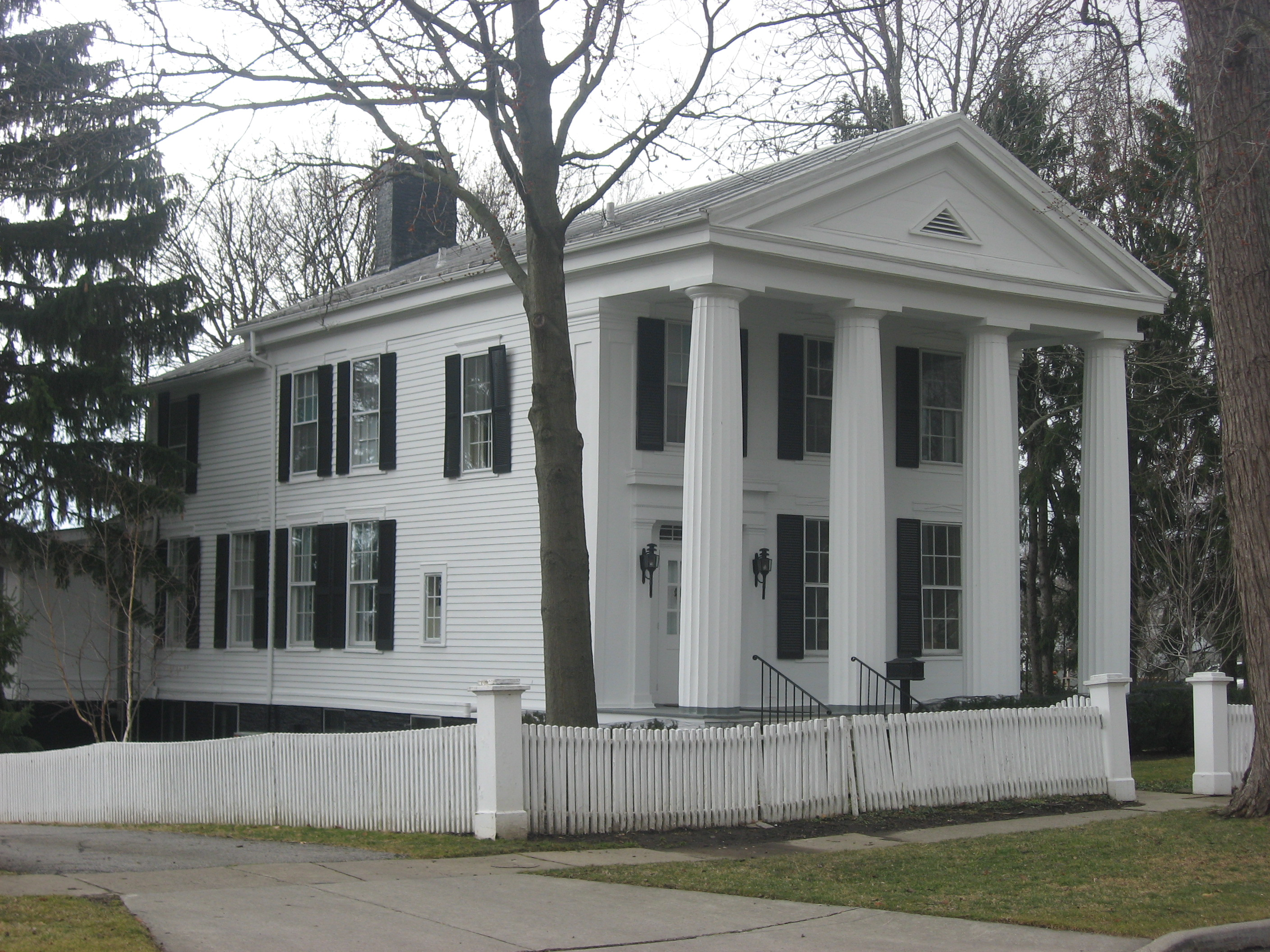
The House of the Four Pillars (322 East Broadway Street, Maumee, Lucas County) was an Underground Railroad station in the Black Swamp, allowing enslaved people to reach Petersburg (Monroe County). Presettlement vegetation maps confirm it resided within swamp forests.

Ohio historian Wilbur Henry Siebert studied how enslaved people used swamps and marshes to hide from slave catchers with bloodhounds, and also to hunt and forage for food and live in makeshift shelters. The Black Swamp was used by the Underground Railroad during slavery to conceal enslaved peoples escaping to Canada from southern plantations. One historian noted enslaved people left Fort Wayne, and "fell into the water and into the mire", then followed the Maumee through the swamp, and moved across Defiance and Monroe counties towards Detroit to reach Canada. Enslaved peoples also followed the Maumee through the swamp to Toledo to reach Canada. New Haven had stations along the Maumee in the swamp's headwaters.

Before reaching the Black Swamp in Fort Wayne, enslaved people led by abolitionist Quakers crossed other wetlands on their journey to Canada, including rivers like the Mississinewa and the swamps and marshes of Marion County, Indiana. The Fugitive Slave Act of 1850 punished anyone who helped enslaved people escape. Railroad stops would change locations to avoid detection.

The swamp was always used to hide people; Indigenous peoples historically used it as shelter from enemies. The swamp's Railroad stops included three sites in Lucas County: the Lathrop House and the Harroun Family Barn in Sylvania, and the House of Four Pillars in Maumee. All three sites were located within elm-ash swamp forests.

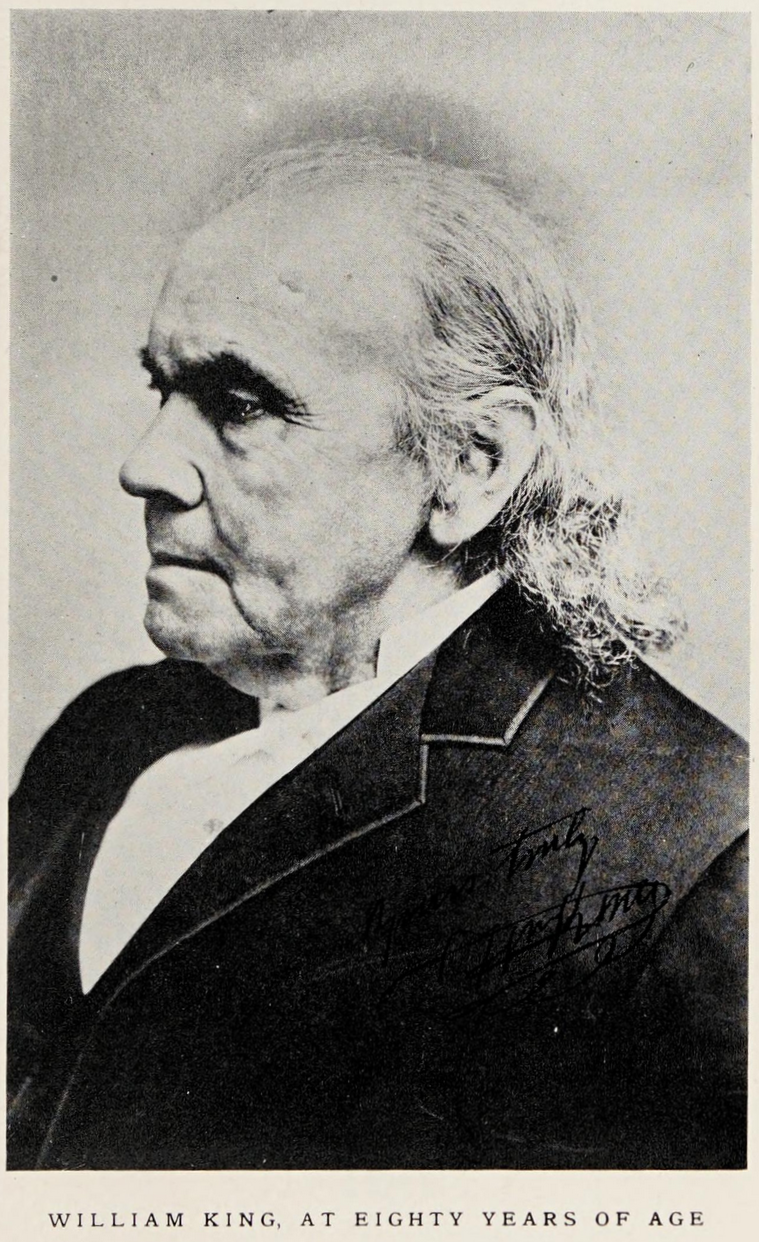
Reverend William King, minister and abolitionist, used a trail in the Black Swamp to lead an estimated 1,000 people to Canada's Buxton Elgin settlement.

In 1998, the U.S. Congress established the Network to Freedom, a National Park Service program dedicated to the preservation and promotion of sites associated with the abolitionist movement. The program officially recognizes three sites within the Black Swamp.

- Howard Family Farm: Located on Beaver Creek (Grand Rapids, Wood County), the farm existed within forests and swamps.
- John King Farm: Located at Route 109 (Delta, Fulton County), the site served the Underground Railroad from 1838 until the American Civil War's end. It existed within oak savannas and swamps.
- King Cemetery: Also in Delta, which existed within swamps and forests of oak, ash, hickory, maple, basswood, elm, and black walnut.

The King Cemetery memorializes prominent abolitionist Reverend William King, founder of the Elgin Settlement (North Buxton) where many people escaping slavery sought freedom. Rev. King began his mission to free the slaves in 1848. His story was told in Annie Straith Jamieson's 1925 book, William King: Friend and Champion of Slaves. Rev. King's brother, John King, who lived in Findlay and was known locally as "Uncle John King", was one of many people who initiated escapes and hid slaves within the swamp counties of Wood and Hancock.

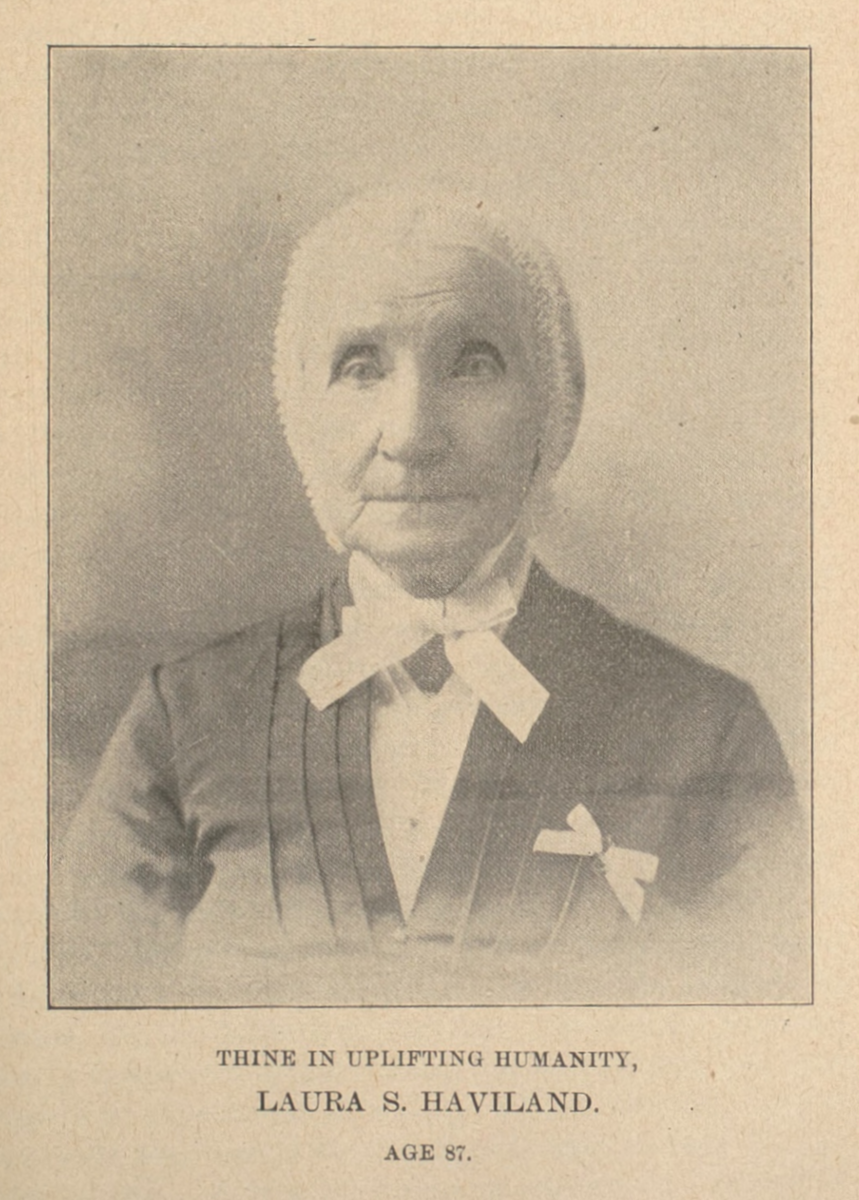
Laura Smith Haviland led enslaved peoples through wetlands to her farm near the Black Swamp, which she called the Cottonwood Swamp.

Additional sites recognized by the Network to Freedom program within the Black Swamp region are located in Fremont (Sandusky County) and also in Adrian (Lenawee County), where a memorial honors the memory of Laura Smith Haviland. Haviland was an Underground Railroad conductor who led slaves through wetlands, even through freezing winter, to the sanctuary of her farm in Raisin (Lenawee County), near the Black Swamp in Michigan. She also established Michigan's first anti-slavery organization, the Logan Female Anti-Slavery Society, in Logan Township (now known as Adrian Township in Lenawee County) near the Black Swamp.

One Underground Railroad route through the swamp began at the confluence of the Auglaize and Blanchard rivers, and ran from Wapakoneta to Ottawa and Grand Rapids, then onwards to Fort Malden in Ontario. An 1831 slave, Tice Davids, used the route from Ripley to Sandusky, which followed the eastern edge of the swamp. At least 23 ports of entry existed on the Ohio River for slaves to cross the state.

Enslaved people hid from slave catchers in the Black Swamp, known by locals and the military as "impassable", with its "knee-deep" muck, thick growth of trees, and fearful reputation. One historian described it as, "the well known and much dreaded Black Swamp, which was a terror to all travelers".

Historians believe more Underground Railroad stations existed in Ohio than the official records state because of the massive organization of effort and resources to deliver slaves to freedom. They estimate 1,543 to over 2,000 Ohio agents and operators helped 40,000 to 50,000 fugitive slaves escape to ports near Cleveland and through the Black Swamp to ports near Toledo and Sandusky. Wilbur Henry Siebert described the Underground Railroad as "the beginning of a renaissance of American morals".

=== Farming and industry ===
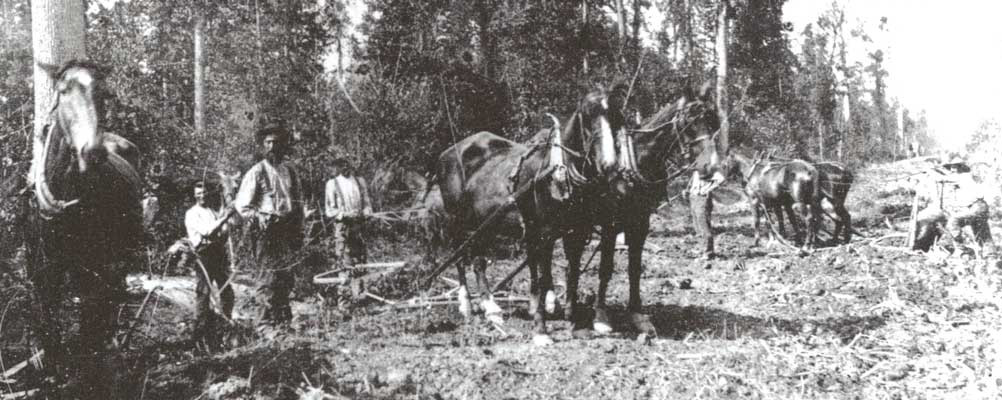
A work crew clearing the Black Swamp for a railroad extension. The resulting rail lines, like the Baltimore and Ohio Railroad, were built through the swamp to transport lumber and crops by steam train.

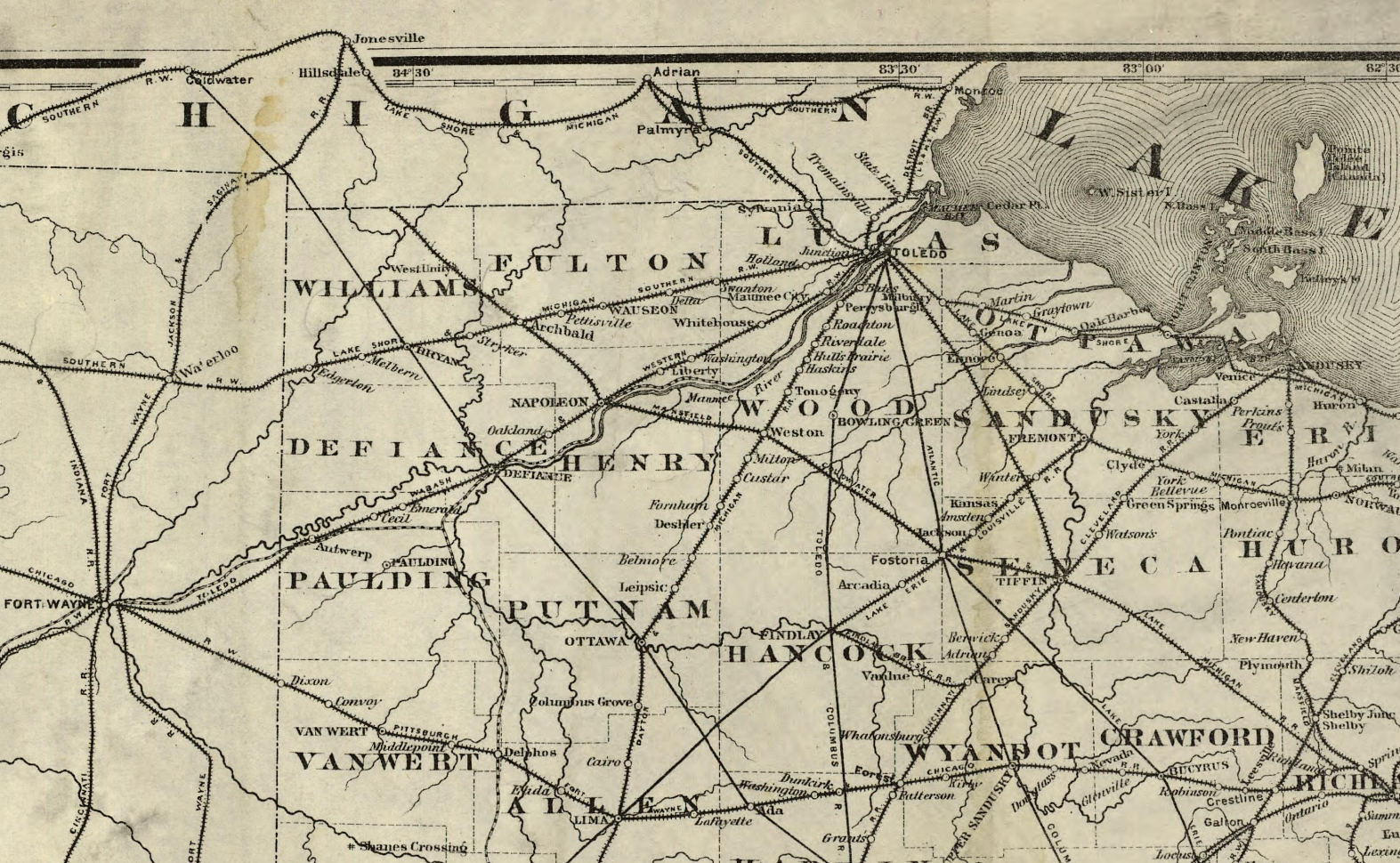
An 1873 map showing the scale of development in the Great Black Swamp. Railroads drove late-19th century growth, allowing people to develop adjacent wetlands, forests, and prairies.

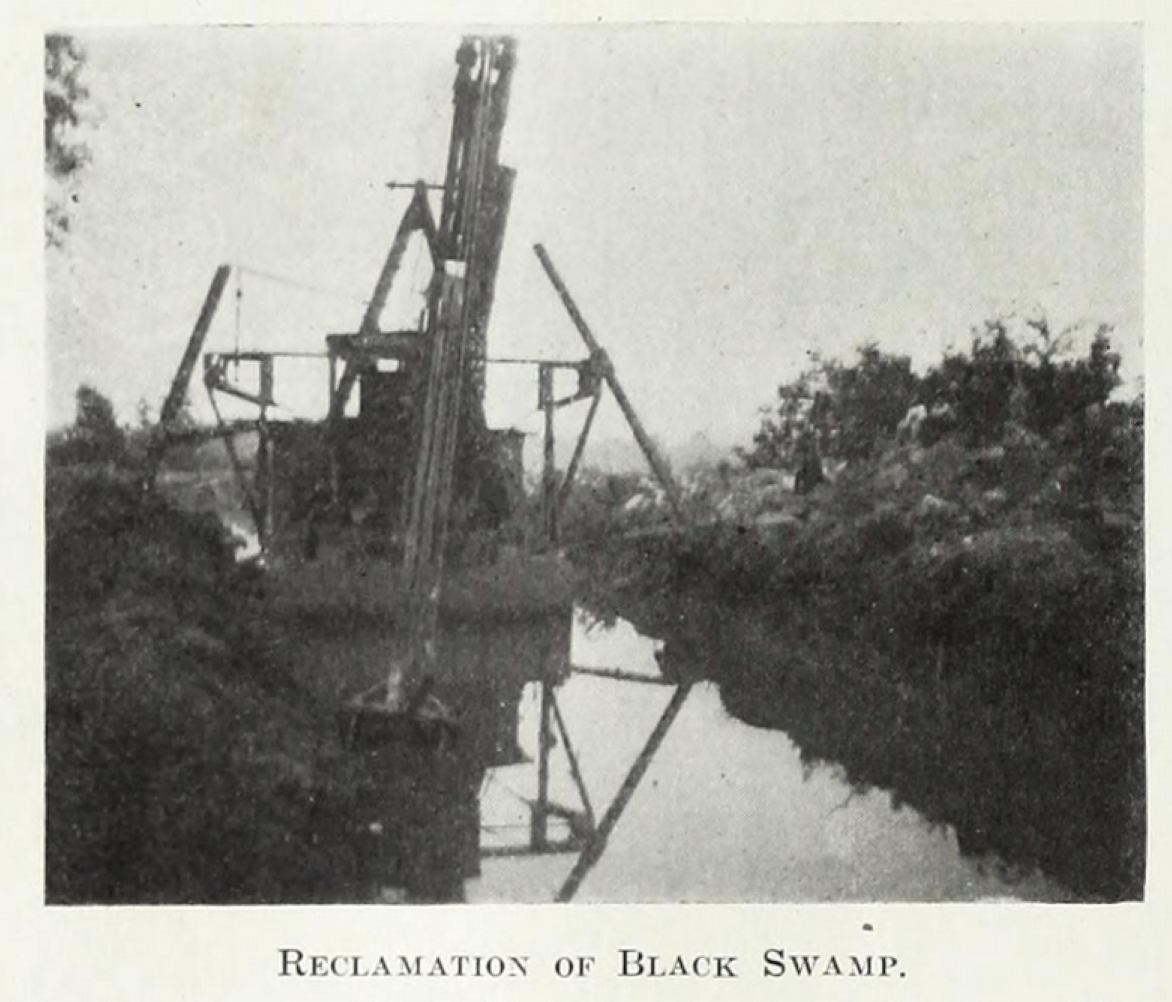
A late-19th century photo of a dredging machine draining the Great Black Swamp in Fulton County.

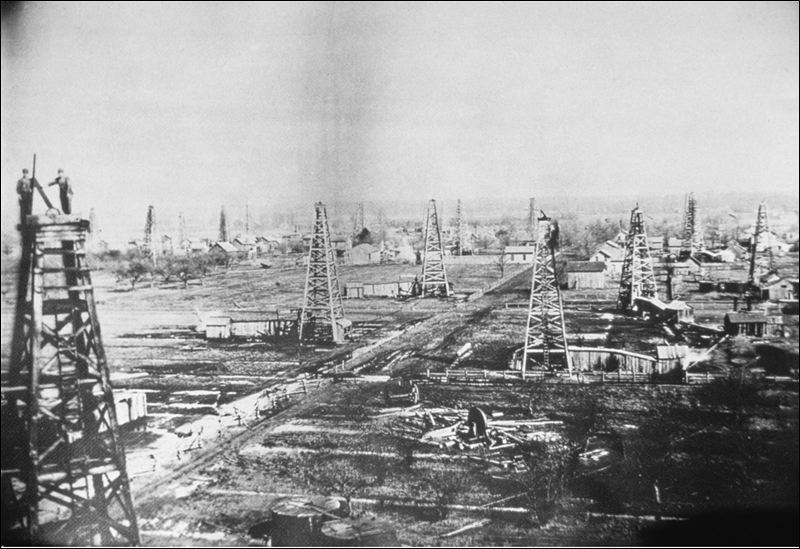
The Cygnet oil pool wells in Bloom Township, Wood County, in 1885. The area used to be beech forests, elm-ash swamps, and prairies, according to 19th-century land surveys.

After the American Civil War, the U.S. focused on westward expansion, and developed more than 30,000 miles (48,000 km) of railroad track by the 1860s. Ohio railroads consumed 1 million cords of wood annually just for fuel (the amount of wood used for railroad ties is unknown), with intense timber cutting and land clearing destroying forests and wetlands, including the Black Swamp.

Arriving alone or with their families, settlers felled trees, built their homes and furniture, dug ditches, hunted wild game for food, and farmed crops, poultry, and dairy. Other enterprises expanded the wealth of the settlers, including gristmills and sawmills, logging and lumbering, and then later, in the 1880s, oil and gas fields in Wood and Hancock counties.

High pressure natural gas was discovered near Findlay while drilling for water in 1884, and petroleum was first discovered in Lima in 1885. In 1895, northwest Ohio reported over 15 million barrels valued at $11.4 million (unadjusted). Findlay and Bowling Green were the two principal centers of fossil fuel production in the 1880s, creating a manufacturing industry that included glass factories and lime burning.

Iron ore imported to Ohio was smelted in Paulding County from the late 1860s to the mid-1880s, with each furnace burning charcoal from about 1,000 acres (400 ha) of local forest each year. By 1884, the Maumee and Paulding Furnace had been burning 15,000 tons of local charcoal and imported Michigan ores annually.

As White American settlers arrived from other states, so too did immigrants from Europe. Irish immigrants drained wetlands, built churches, and brought their culture and customs to the region. Germans from the Austrian Empire, Switzerland (post-Napoleonic era), the German Confederation and later the German Empire, and other regions from Central/Eastern Europe, also developed the swamp. Ohio State Board of Agriculture reports were translated for German Americans.

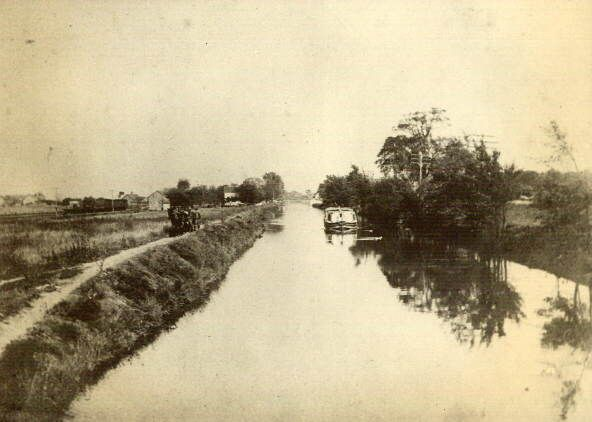
Miami and Erie Canal (Maumee, 1900). Built through the Black Swamp, it provided a supply route and improved the region's economy.

In the 1840s, European immigrants (English, Scottish, German, Irish) earned money to buy swampland by digging ditches. Other European immigrants included Hungarians who had left the Kingdom of Hungary, and later the Austro-Hungarian Empire. They arrived in northwest Ohio, often because of poverty and over-population in their homeland's rural areas, where semi-feudal land systems created social-economic inequalities for them and their families.

Polish immigrants arrived in the swamp (1870s–1880s), some of whom were fleeing Kulturkampf. Other ethnic groups fleeing economic, religious, and political challenges from Central/Eastern Europe included people from Galicia, in what is now southeastern Poland and Western Ukraine. While some of them worked in Toledo's industries, others farmed in the former swamp, able to own their own land, a right that was taken away from them back in their homeland.

The swamp's rich soils provided a new beginning for African-Americans in farming. This was not made easy by the Ohio Black Laws of 1804 and 1807, which made Black people pay a residency fee, register with the county clerk, have a White Ohian as a sponsor, and obtain travel and freedom papers, all under the threat of expulsion. These laws codified white supremacy, imposing cruel restrictions, and making Black residents vulnerable to kidnapping and trafficking to the South. Successful African-Americans included Archibald Worthington, a former slave. In 1855, near his 160-acre (65 ha) farm in Defiance County, he created a cemetery which he platted for and donated to other African-Americans. His cemetery and farm were south of the Maumee near wetlands, prairies, and forests. The cemetery received a historic marker in 2025.

A 2009 study described African-American lives in 19th-century northwest Ohio, including a 750-acre (300 ha) colony of former slaves in Van Wert County; how the family of Godfrey Brown, a runaway slave and Continental Army soldier, brought relatives to Van Wert after buying their release from a Southern plantation in 1830; and generational land owners in Paulding County, like Charles Williams, born 1867, who lived and worked on the farm his grandfather had bought after fleeing slavery. It described how racial prejudice was rare where Black people lived in Paulding, Van Wert, and other Black Swamp counties, and how Black residents sometimes married White and Indigenous people. 1870s race riots pushed out many Black families from the region. This contributed to black land loss in the United States.

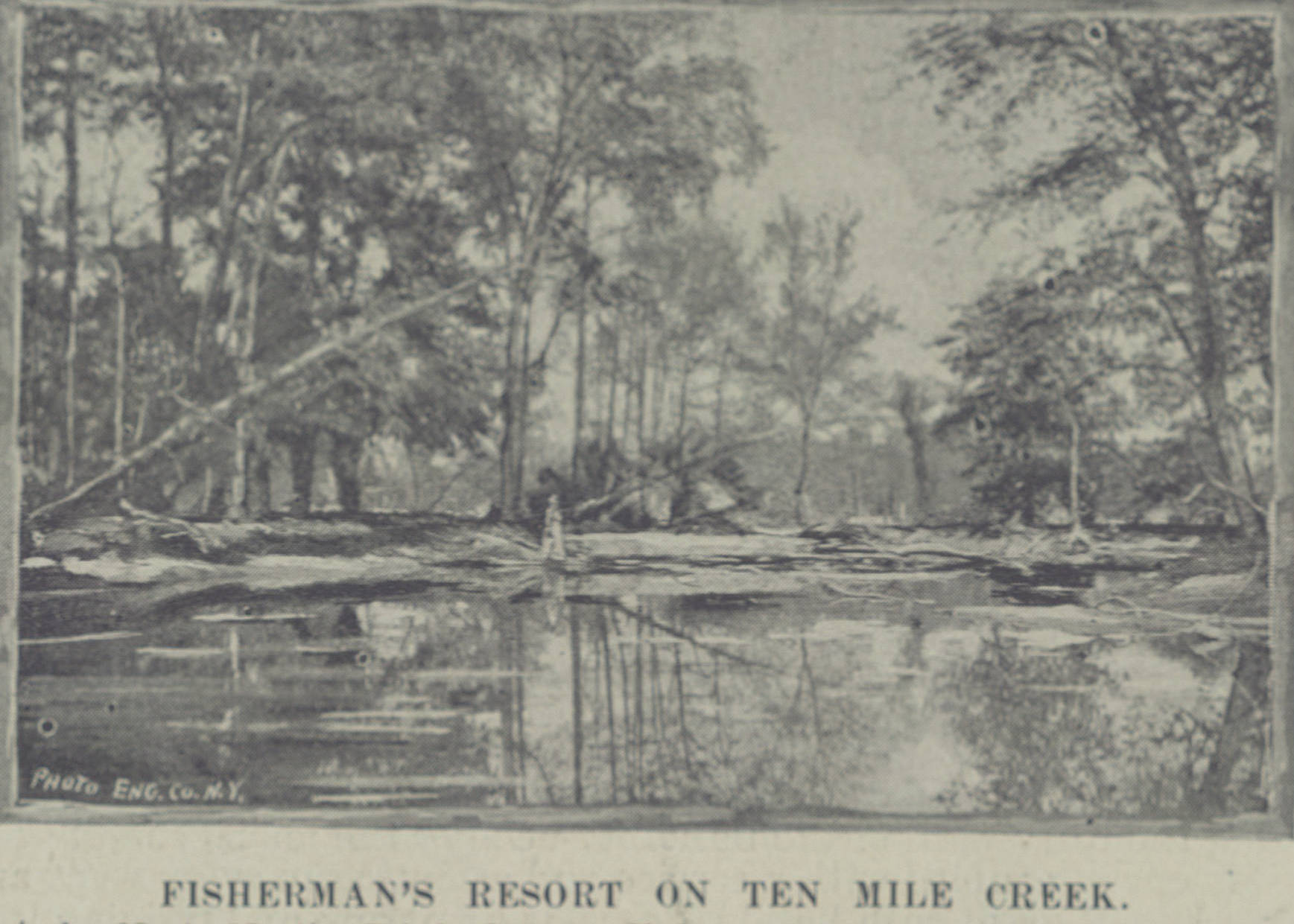
Tenmile Creek (Lucas County, 1892) was in the Black Swamp, according to land surveys.

By 1887, two-fifths of Henry County were owned by land companies and speculators which heavily drained and timbered the Black Swamp. Industrialists exploited the swamp, including Eber Brock Ward. In 1863, Ward purchased 4,089 acres (1,655 ha) of Lucas County wetlands, and named it "New Jerusalem" (modern-day Jerusalem Township). He commissioned a trade canal between Cedar Creek and Lake Erie; while a steam-powered dredger was used, most excavation was performed manually. Lumbering was profitable there until an 1895 muck fire burned for three months, destroying the canal's remaining trees.

By 1876, the Black Swamp's fifteen Ohio counties had over 4,921 miles (7,920 km) of county ditches and 1,825 miles (2,937 km) of township ditches. That same year, the number of drainage tile establishments in the fifteen Ohio swamp counties was thirty-nine. By 1880, they had over fifty tile factories in northwest Ohio. Bowling Green resident James B. Hill expedited the draining of swamps with his Buckeye Traction Ditcher. Built in 1893, it was the first successful steam-driven tractor ditcher.

== Draining the swamp ==
=== Fate of the environment ===
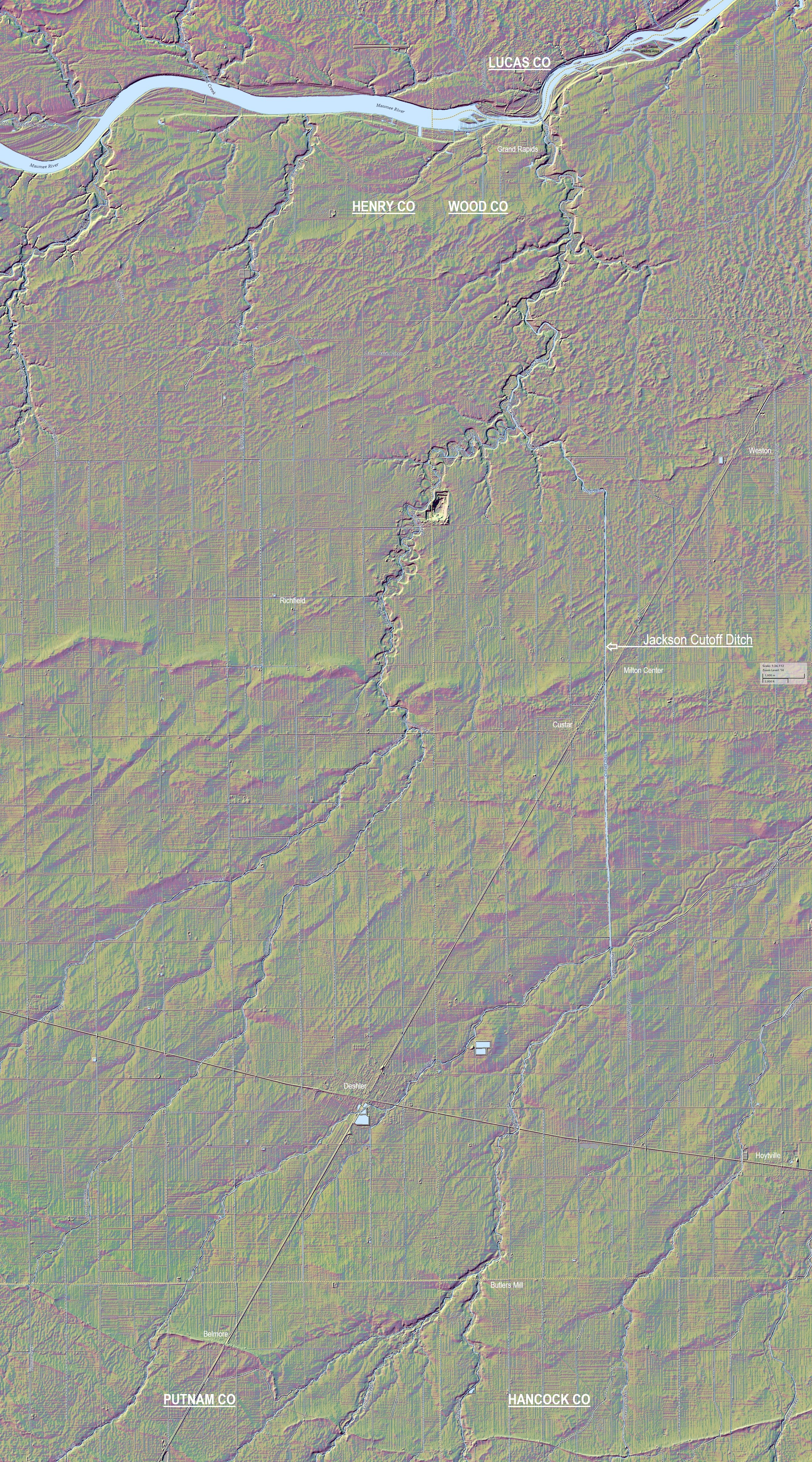
A Lidar DEM of roads and ditches over original stream channels.

In the mid-19th century, Ohio did not view the draining of the swamp as resource depletion, environmental degradation, biodiversity loss, or ecosystem collapse. They instead viewed it as "redeeming" the lands for human use.

Projects like the Jackson Cut-Off Ditch eliminated the Black Swamp. Authorized by the 1871 and 1878 ditch laws, it was completed in 1879 for $110,000 and drained 30,000 acres (12,000 ha) of wetlands. It diverted Yellow and Brush Creeks and the Portage River's North Branch into Beaver Creek and the Maumee to drain Wood, Henry, Hancock, and Putnam counties. Local farming communities maintain ditches to prevent flooding.

The 1920 U.S. census recorded 24,984 miles (40,208 km) of completed open ditches and 9,205 miles (14,814 km) of tile drains in Ohio. Approximately 15,000 miles (24,000 km) of these ditches were located within the former Black Swamp.

By 1883, deforestation reduced Ohio's forests from 24 million acres (9,712,455 ha) to 4 million acres (1,618,743 ha). By 1890, all the swamp's trees in Paulding County were logged for fuel and lumber.

One 19th-century account lamented the loss of money, not ecology, when black walnut was destroyed by settlers unaware the trees were financially worth more than the land. Historian Martin Kaatz noted how settlers waged "war" with nature, stating, "trees had to be felled, underbrush cleared, stumps removed, and predatory animals killed".

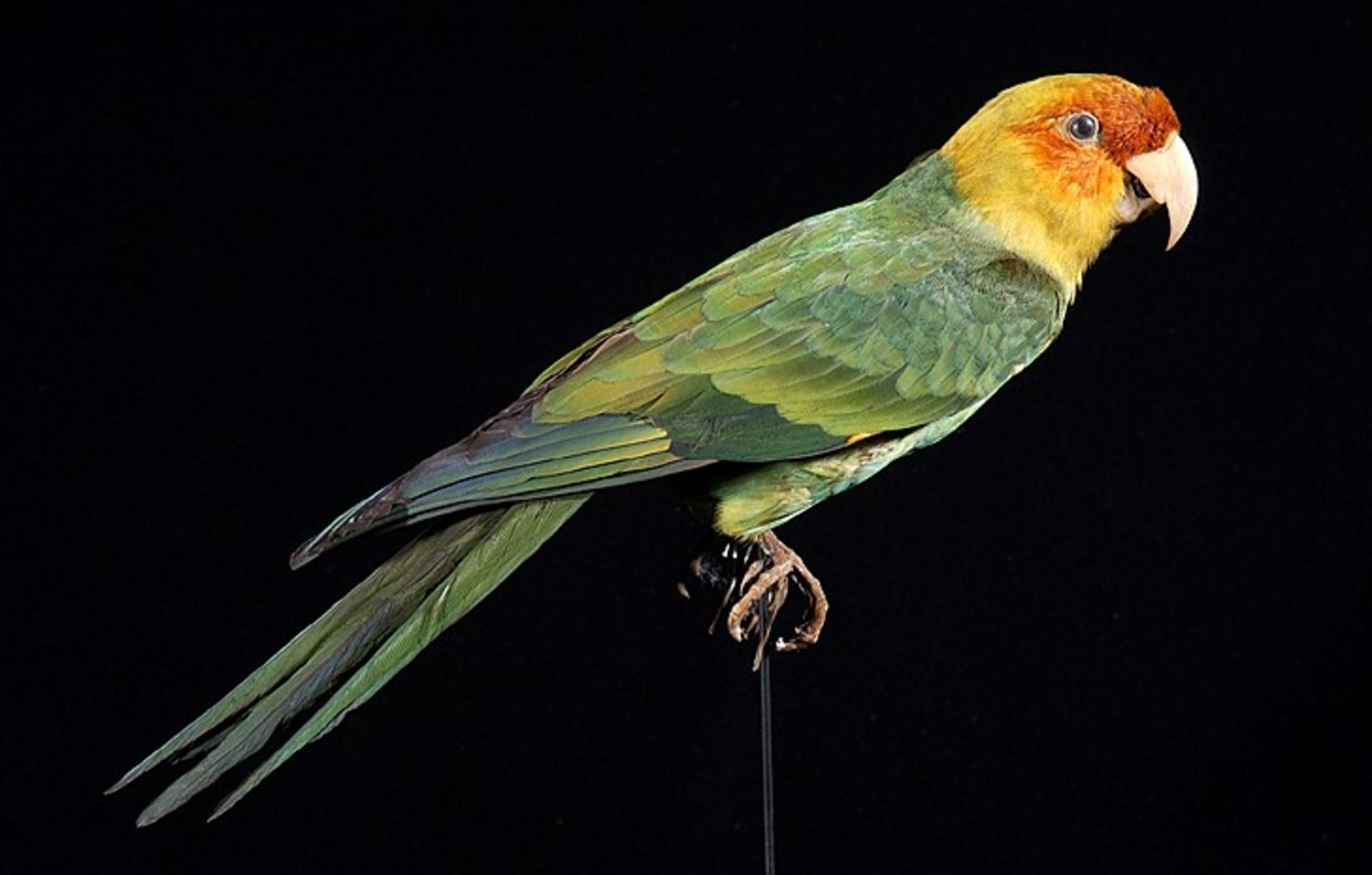
The Carolina parakeet became extinct due to overhunting and habitat destruction. It inhabited the Black Swamp along the Maumee River.

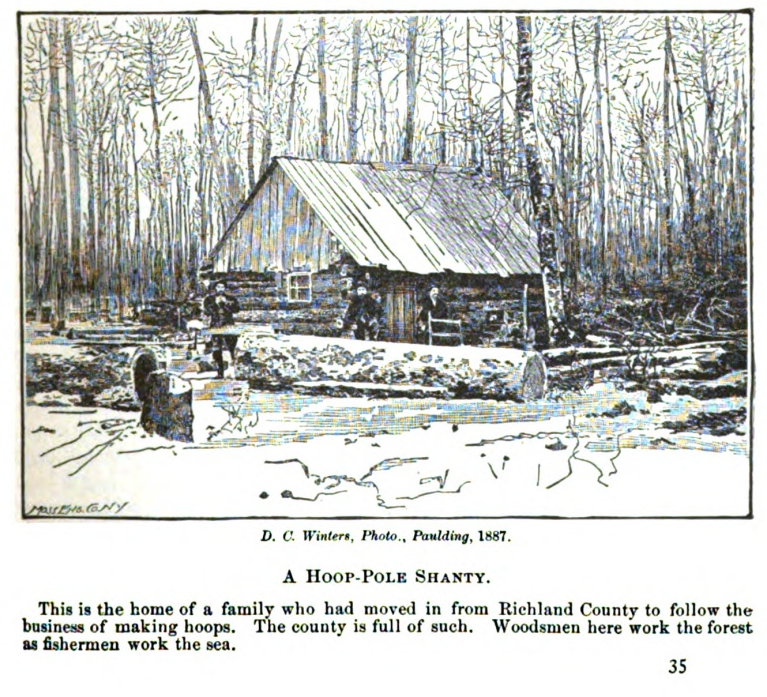
Lumberjacks, Paulding County (1887). Deforestation wiped out most of Ohio forests.

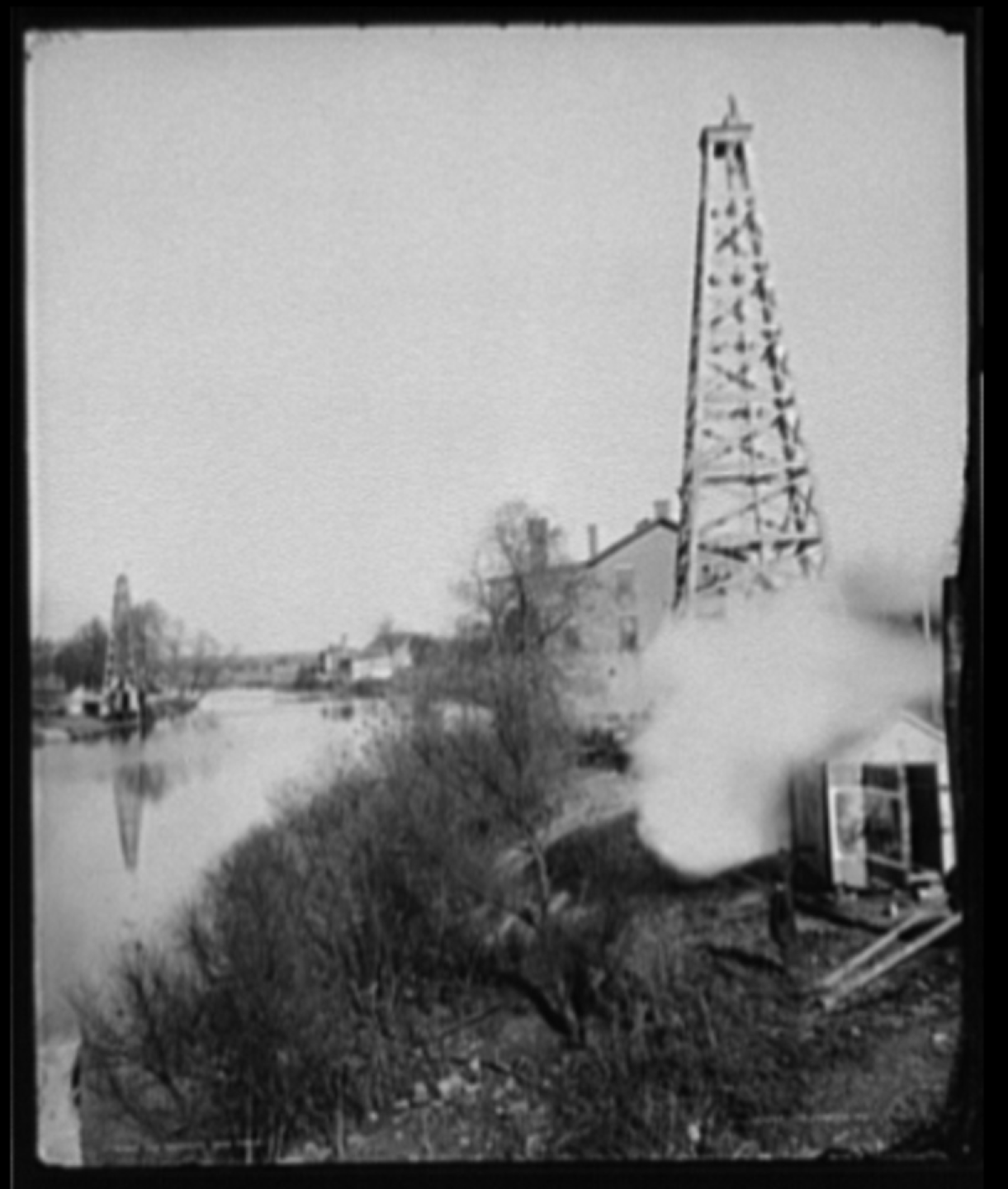
A Sandusky River oil well, Tiffin (Seneca County), (1892).

Between 1800 and 1855, settlers had completely extirpated wolves, bobcats, elk, mountain lions, and bison from Ohio. By 1881, the last black bear was killed in the swamp in Paulding County, where settlers were nearly finished clearing trees and draining wetlands. A section of Indiana's Black Swamp in Jackson Township was known as "Bear's Nest" or "Bear Swamp", where hunters killed black bear.

The Passenger pigeon also inhabited the swamp, living among the trees unbothered by the muddy surface. It was hunted to extinction, with the last one dying in the Cincinnati Zoo in 1914.

During the 19th century, prevailing social views favored draining wetlands for agricultural use. Even Charles Dickens in 1842 wrote favorably of Ohio potentially reclaiming wetlands he observed near Cincinnati. However, this era also saw growing recognition of human rights and environmental abuses.

In Hard Times, Dickens, who was anti-slavery, opposed the industrial application of utilitarianism, which exploited workers for the sake of maximum "utility". Scholars have argued such utilitarian mindsets often struggle to account for empathy or conservation. A prime example is the destruction of the Grand Kankakee Marsh; writer Earl Reed suggested utilitarians "triumphed" when they sacrificed it "for the sake of immediate wealth".

In Greensburg Township, Putnam County, settlers reportedly perceived the Blanchard River's wetlands as "worthless" until they drained them for farming. Wetlands were also deemed "worthless" in places like Lenawee County. In Sandusky County, wetlands were considered "useless" until they became wheat fields.

Wetlands in Ohio were also considered "evil" by those promoting their drainage for farming.

By the late 19th century, natural resource management emerged as U.S. deforestation and industrialization opened people's eyes to the damage from land exploitation and overexploiting forests and wildlife. The Ohio Fish Commission (established 1873) and the Ohio Forestry Bureau (established 1885) were among the first government agencies to manage Ohio's natural resources. But for the Great Black Swamp, they were too late.

In less than thirty years (1859–1885), the Great Black Swamp, once teeming with countless plants and animals, was erased from the land that had shaped it since the end of the Younger Dryas 11,700 years ago. Approximately 80% of the former swamp is now cropland, while 0.02% remains freshwater wetland.

=== Economic and population growth ===
The Black Swamp's soils powered agricultural growth, and were initially viewed as "inexhaustible". When long-term farming exhausted their original nutrients, fertilizers became widely used. By 1870, wetlands purchased for $2–$10 per acre were valued at $20–$50 per acre once drained for farming.

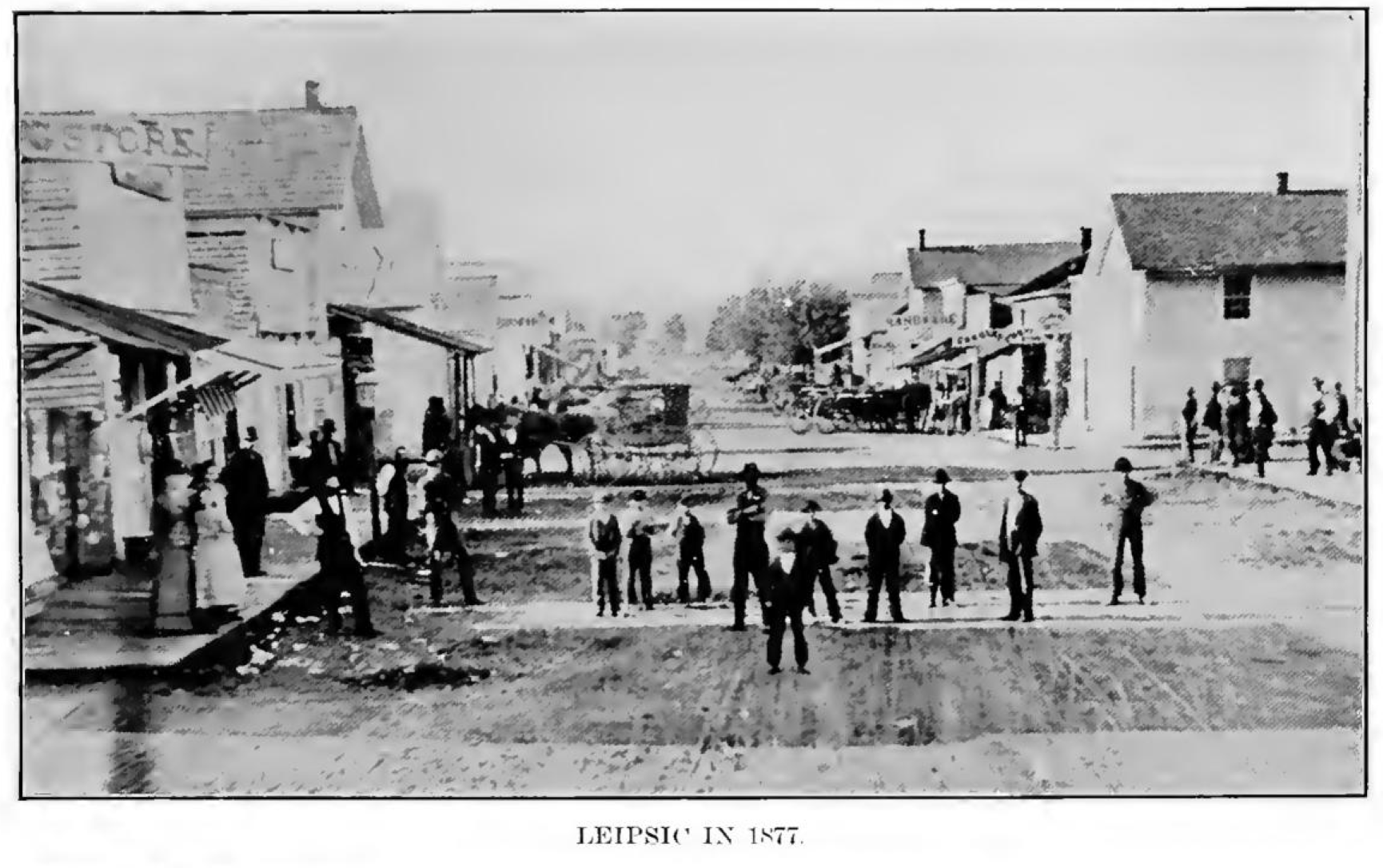
An 1877 photo of Leipsic in Putnam County. Its county population grew from 17,081 in 1870 to 23,713 in 1880, according to the 1920 Ohio census. This area was formerly forests of beech and oak-sugar maple, elm-ash swamps, and prairies, according to 19th-century land surveys.

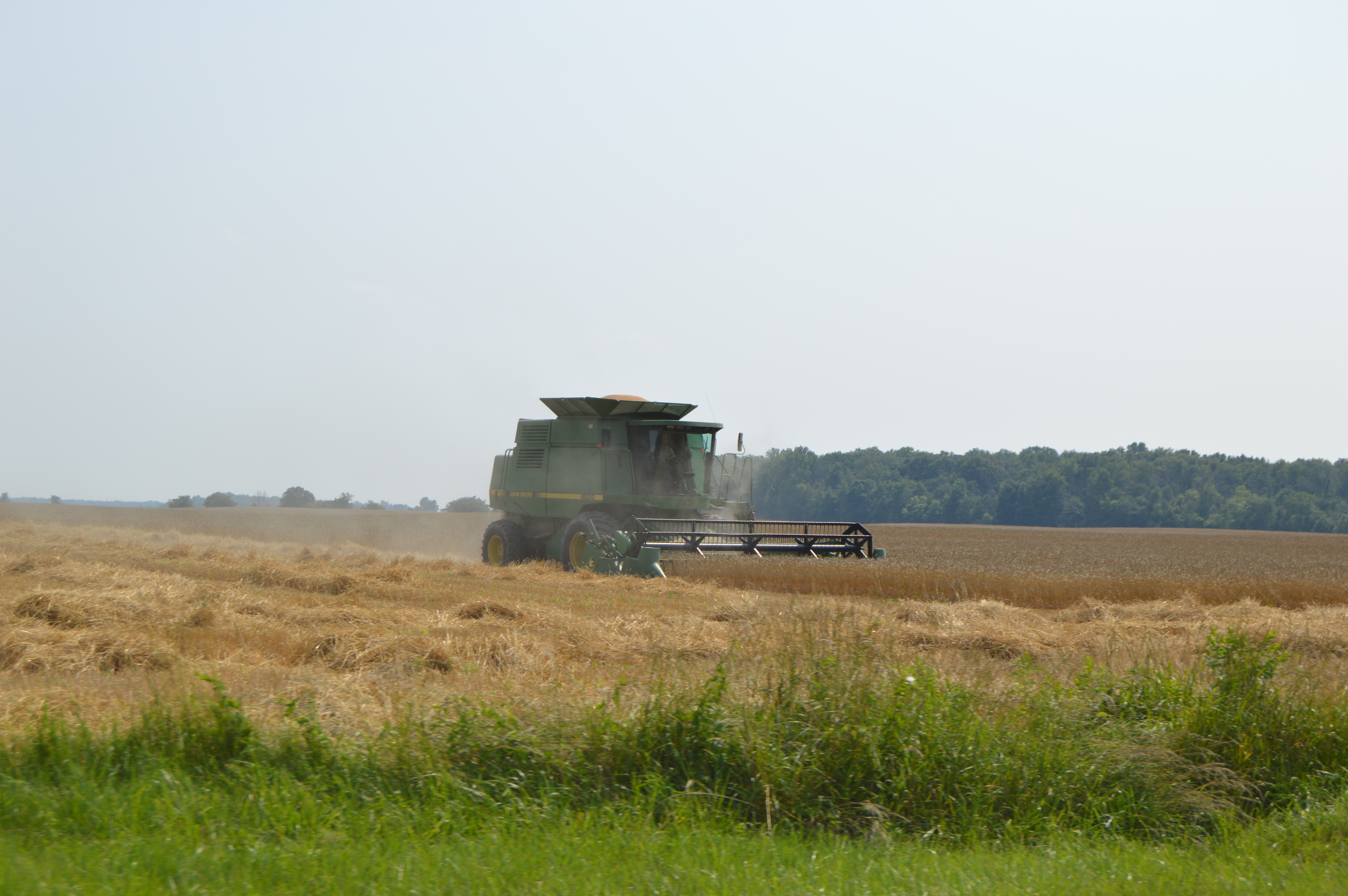
Wheat harvesting in Pleasant Township, Hancock County. This area used to be beech forests and elm-ash swamps, according to 19th-century land surveys. The county's crop revenues in 2022 were about $198 million, according to the USDA.

In Ohio, the swamp spanned Allen, Defiance, Erie, Fulton, Hancock, Henry, Lucas, Ottawa, Paulding, Putnam, Sandusky, Seneca, Van Wert, Williams, and Wood counties. The 1920 U.S. Census recorded 42,654 farms in the former Ohio swamp region, reporting $126,317,389 in crop values and $46,300,243 in livestock values (unadjusted). Crops included corn, wheat, oats, cereals, fruits (e.g., apples, peaches, strawberries, raspberries), potatoes, tobacco, sugar beets, forage, and hay. The census detailed labor and supply costs, livestock totals, the value of related products (dairy, wool), farm mortgage debts, and other important figures.

The total population for the fifteen Ohio former swamp counties in 1920 was 740,177. It was 249,029 in 1860, when settlers had spent a year beginning to drain the swamp since the Ohio Ditch Law was passed in 1859.

In 2022, the United States Department of Agriculture (USDA) Ohio census reported the number of farms and revenues from the fifteen Ohio counties in the former swamp. In total, they had 12,478 farms, and generated $2,512,448,000 in crop revenues and $1,039,481,000 in livestock revenues. In 2020, the total population of the fifteen Ohio counties was 1,198,555.

In Indiana, the swamp extended into Allen County. In 1920, the census reported Allen County had 4,221 farms, and reported $11,054,888 in crop values and $5,069,454 in livestock values (unadjusted). In 2022, the USDA census reported Allen County had 1,497 farms and $254,903,000 in crop revenues and $55,600,000 in livestock revenues. In 1920, Allen County's total population was 114,303. In 2020, it was 385,410.

In Michigan, the swamp extended into Lenawee and Monroe counties. The 1920 census reported both counties had 9,188 farms, and reported $21,878,825 from crop values and $11,737,254 in livestock values (unadjusted). In 2022, the USDA census reported both counties had 2,327 farms and reported $435,654,000 in crop revenues and $112,652,000 in livestock revenues. In 1920, the total population for both counties was 84,882. In 2020, it was 254,232.

In 2022, the counties inside the former Great Black Swamp (15 in Ohio, 2 in Michigan, 1 in Indiana) earned approximately $3.2 billion in crop revenues and over $1 billion in livestock revenues for their states' economies.

== Revival of the swamp ==
=== Repairing ecosystems ===
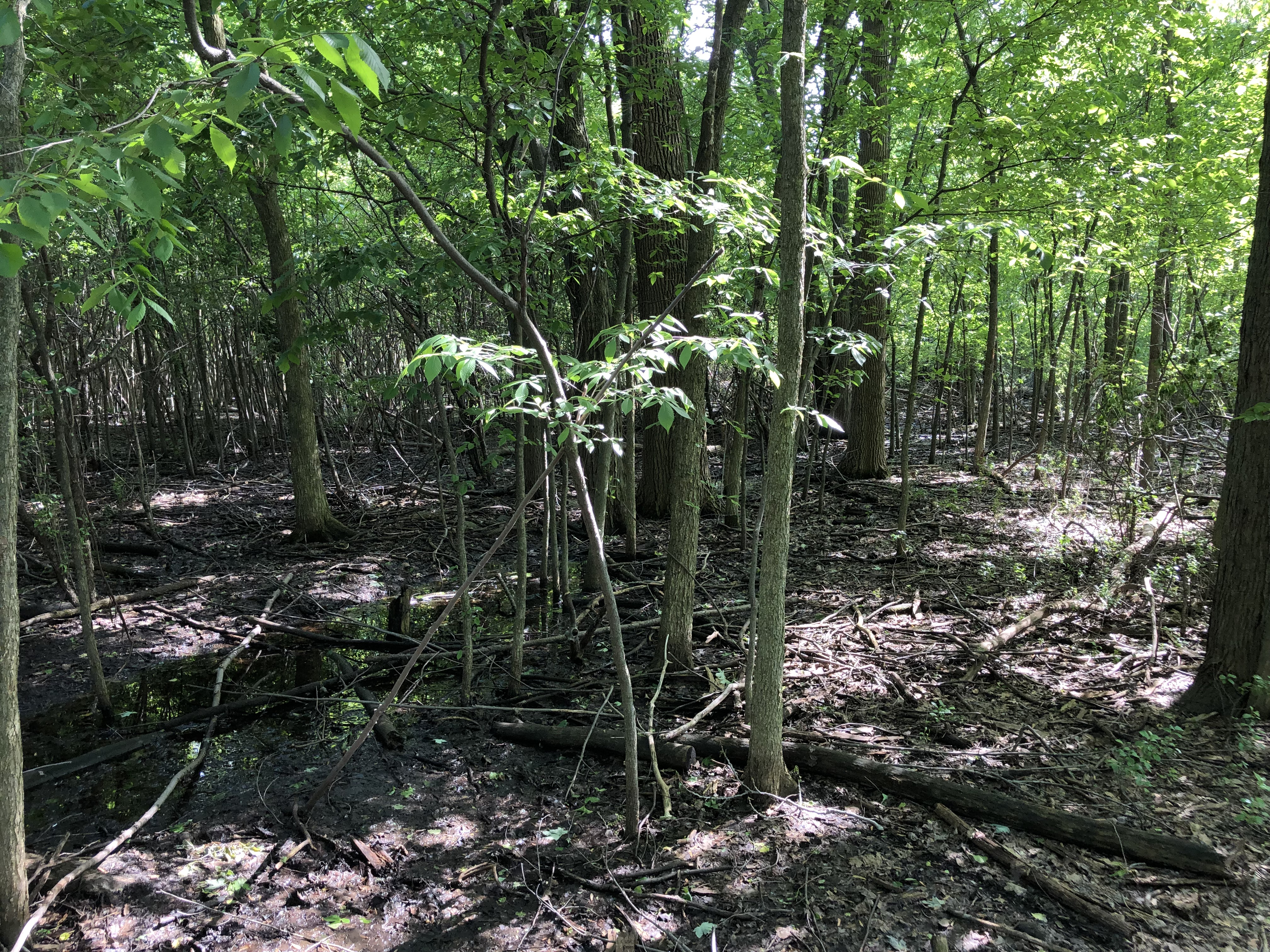
A restored Black Swamp wetland in Bowling Green. Before settlement, this area used to be swamps, forests, prairies, and oak savannas, according to 19th-century land surveys.

Following Lake Erie's harmful algal blooms in 2011, interest has grown in restoring portions of the drained Black Swamp to filter nutrients from farm runoff. William J. Mitsch called for the restoration of 150 square miles (390 km^{2}) of the original swamp. This would reduce phosphorus inflow from the Maumee River to Lake Erie by 40%.

Founded in 1993, the Black Swamp Conservancy protects 17,600 acres (7,100 ha) of former swamplands throughout northwest Ohio. Their recent restoration project, the Clary Boulee McDonald Preserve, became the Seneca County Park in 2024. This site, located next to Wolf Creek, used to be beech forests and elm-ash swamp forests in the 19th century. The restoration establishes wildlife corridors and visitor trails. The organization consistently collaborates with local farmers to ensure its restoration efforts benefit surrounding communities.

The Oak Openings Region hosts preserves managed by The Nature Conservancy and the Ohio Department of Natural Resources (Ohio DNR). The Nature Conservancy owns the 1,400-acre (570 ha) Kitty Todd Nature Preserve in Lucas County, an assemblage of oak savanna and restored Black Swamp wetlands. The Ohio DNR manages former Black Swamp sites north of the Maumee River like Campbell State Nature Preserve, Irwin Prairie State Nature Preserve, and Goll Woods State Nature Preserve.

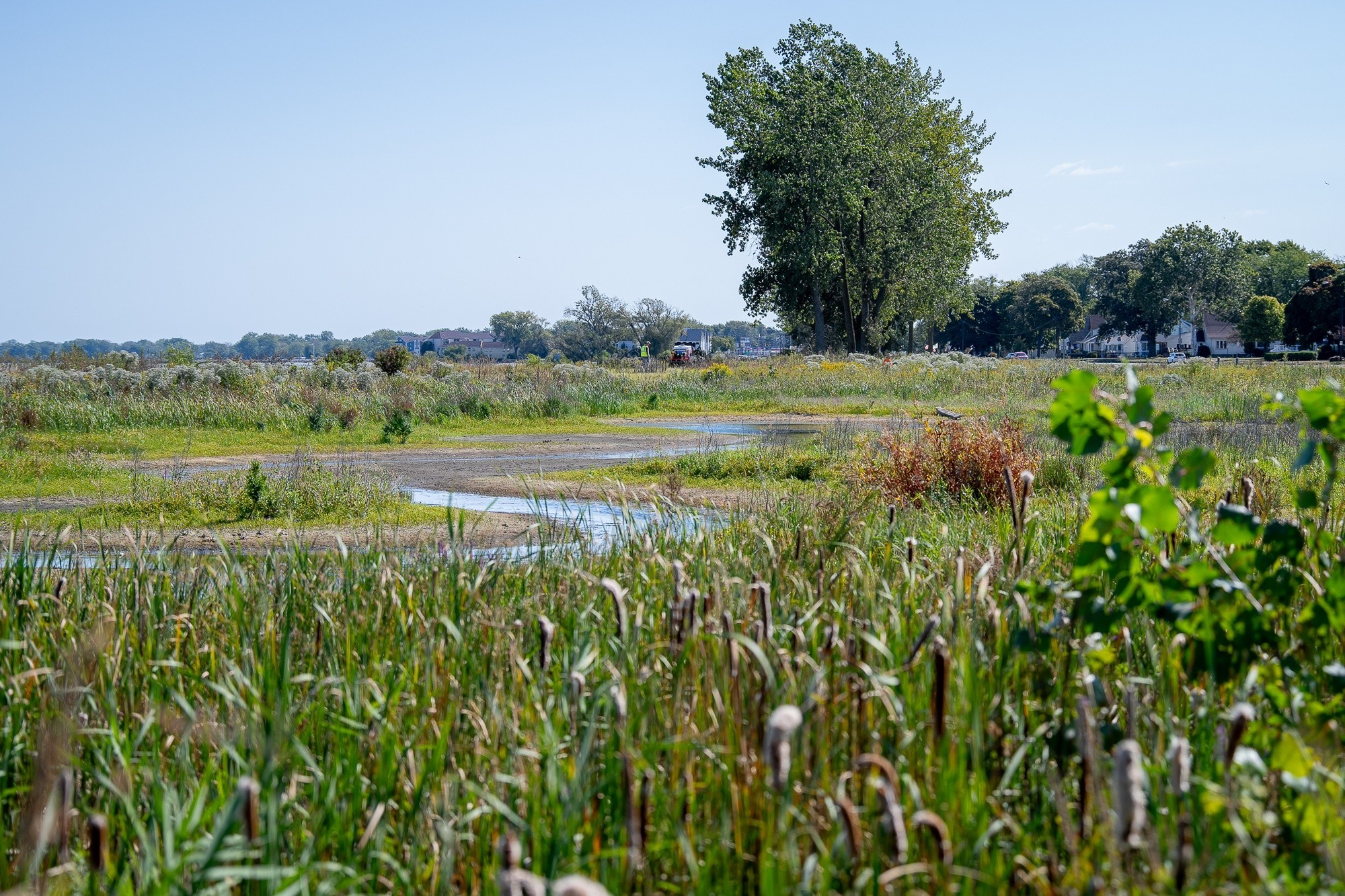
A Port Clinton wetland, part of the former Black Swamp, restored by the U.S. Army Corps of Engineers.

Metroparks Toledo restores former Black Swamp wetlands, such as Howard Marsh Metropark. This restoration converted about 1,000 acres (400 ha) of agricultural land into wetland, and now provides habitat for over half of Ohio's bird species. Pearson Metropark is another example of both a historic, old growth wet forest, paired with sections of restored wetlands.

In 2024, the U.S. Army Corps of Engineers (USACE) completed a five-year restoration of 12 acres (4.9 ha) of former Black Swamp wetlands at Port Clinton in Ottawa County. According to the land surveys from the early 19th century, the area the USACE restored used to be freshwater fens and marshes, and also elm-ash swamp forests. Upon project completion, the USACE stated, "Wetlands are essential to the health of our Great Lakes".

=== Preventing pollution ===
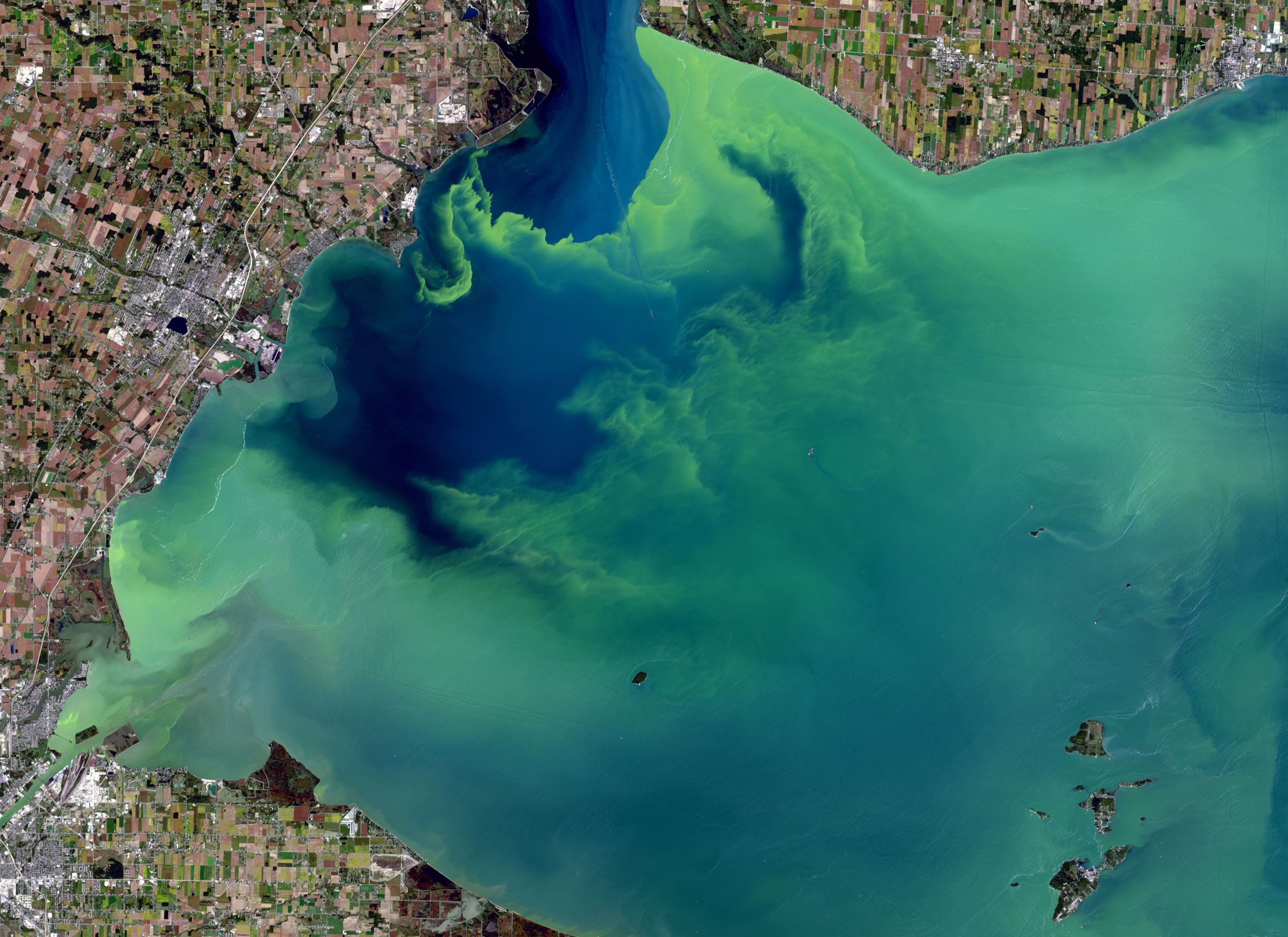
Landsat 8 captured this image of a harmful algal bloom event in Lake Erie on September 26, 2017, near Toledo, Ohio. It was caused by excessive nutrient pollution in the Maumee River watershed, mostly from agriculture.

Fertilizers restore soil nutrients depleted by farming to maintain crop productivity. However, fertilizers and farm runoff also become pollution sources that fuel the growth of harmful algal blooms (HABs) through eutrophication.

In 2014, HABs shut down Toledo's water supply. Over $10 million were estimated in lost shoreline property value services, and over 500,000 Toledo residents could not drink the city's tap water for three days.

HABs threaten public health. Airborne HAB toxins can cause eye irritation, breathing problems, and trigger asthma attacks. When cyanobacteria release powerful toxins such as microcystin and microcystin-LR, they can harm the human liver, worsen pre-existing colitis, exacerbate lung inflammation in asthma, and amplify the non-alcoholic fatty liver disease which is common in people living with diabetes.

HABs hurt Ohio's economy. A 2017 study determined Ohio lakeshore homes can lose 22% of their value when located near algal-infested waters. A 2018 study determined algal blooms in the Western Basin of Lake Erie could cost Ohio beach and fishing recreation $59.2 million and $5.3 million each year. The International Joint Commission estimated Ohio lost $71 million in economic benefits from a 2011 HAB event, and lost $65 million from the 2014 event.

In 2019, Governor Mike DeWine established the H2Ohio water quality initiative to prevent Lake Erie HABs by helping farmers reduce nutrient pollution and agricultural pollution. The program funds projects like two-stage ditches and wetland restoration to filter nutrients from farm runoff. In 2023, the Ohio Department of Agriculture awarded $4.2 million for ditch projects.

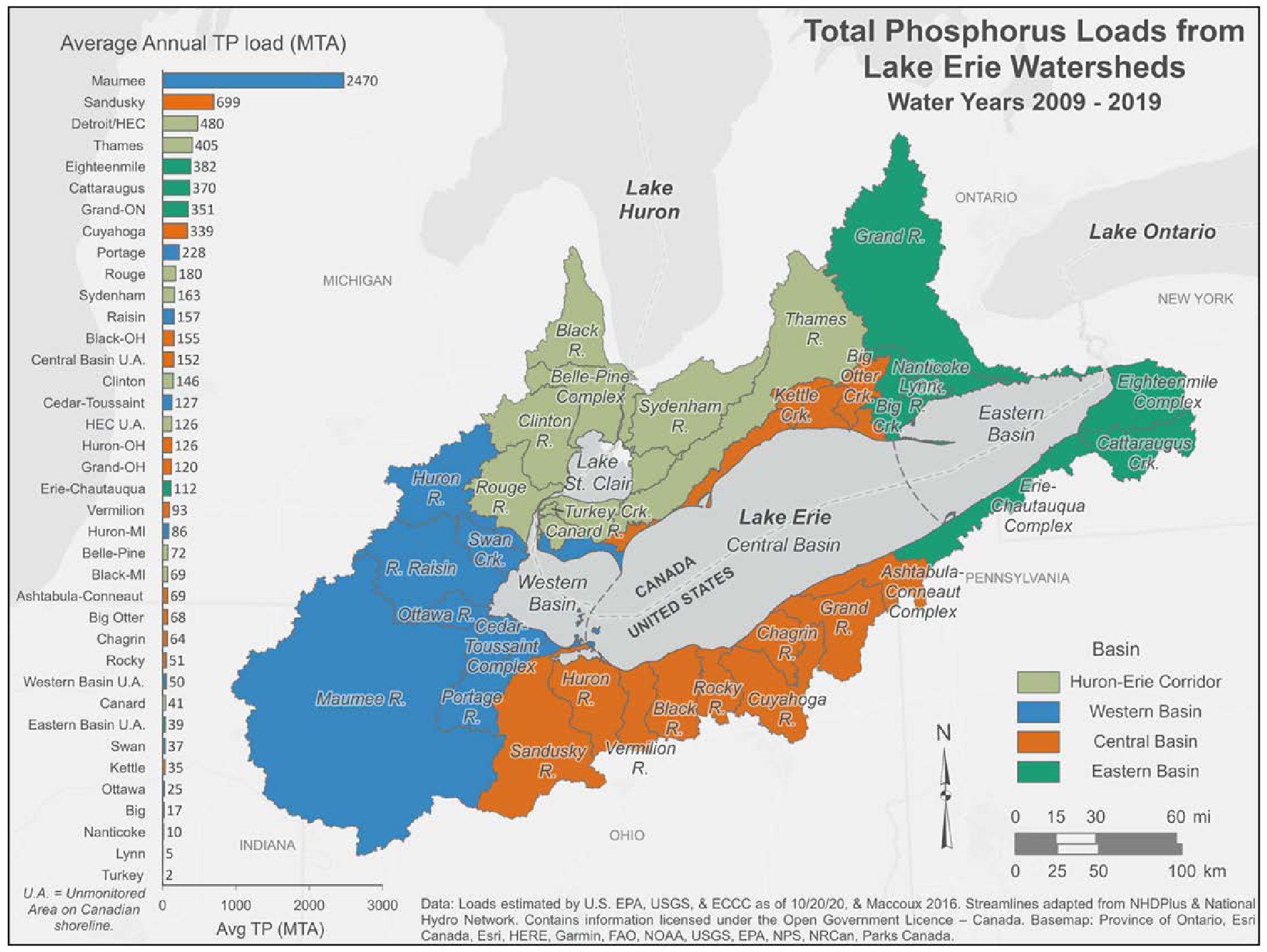
Total Phosphorus (TP) loads from Lake Erie watersheds (2009–2019), with total phosphorus by Metric Tons Annually (MTA).

In July 2025, Gov. DeWine signed a budget bill approving House and Senate proposals for over $120 million in cuts to H2Ohio – a 45% reduction.

A 2026 report determined H2Ohio's wetland restoration and phosphorus reduction programs brought more than $300 million in economic benefits to the state, with every dollar invested generating eight dollars for the economy.

The Ohio EPA confirms the Maumee watershed contributes the most phosphorus pollution to Lake Erie. Nutrient pollution from farms includes commercial fertilizers (e.g., superphosphate, monoammonium phosphate, diammonium phosphate) and organic sources (e.g., manure, composts, biosolids). "Legacy phosphorus" (older phosphorus deposits stored in the banks of ditches and streams) also contributes to pollution.

Through voluntary programs, the U.S. Department of Agriculture (USDA) and the Natural Resources Conservation Service (NRCS) help farmers mitigate nutrient pollution via wetland restoration, denitrifying bioreactors, and controlled tile drainage.

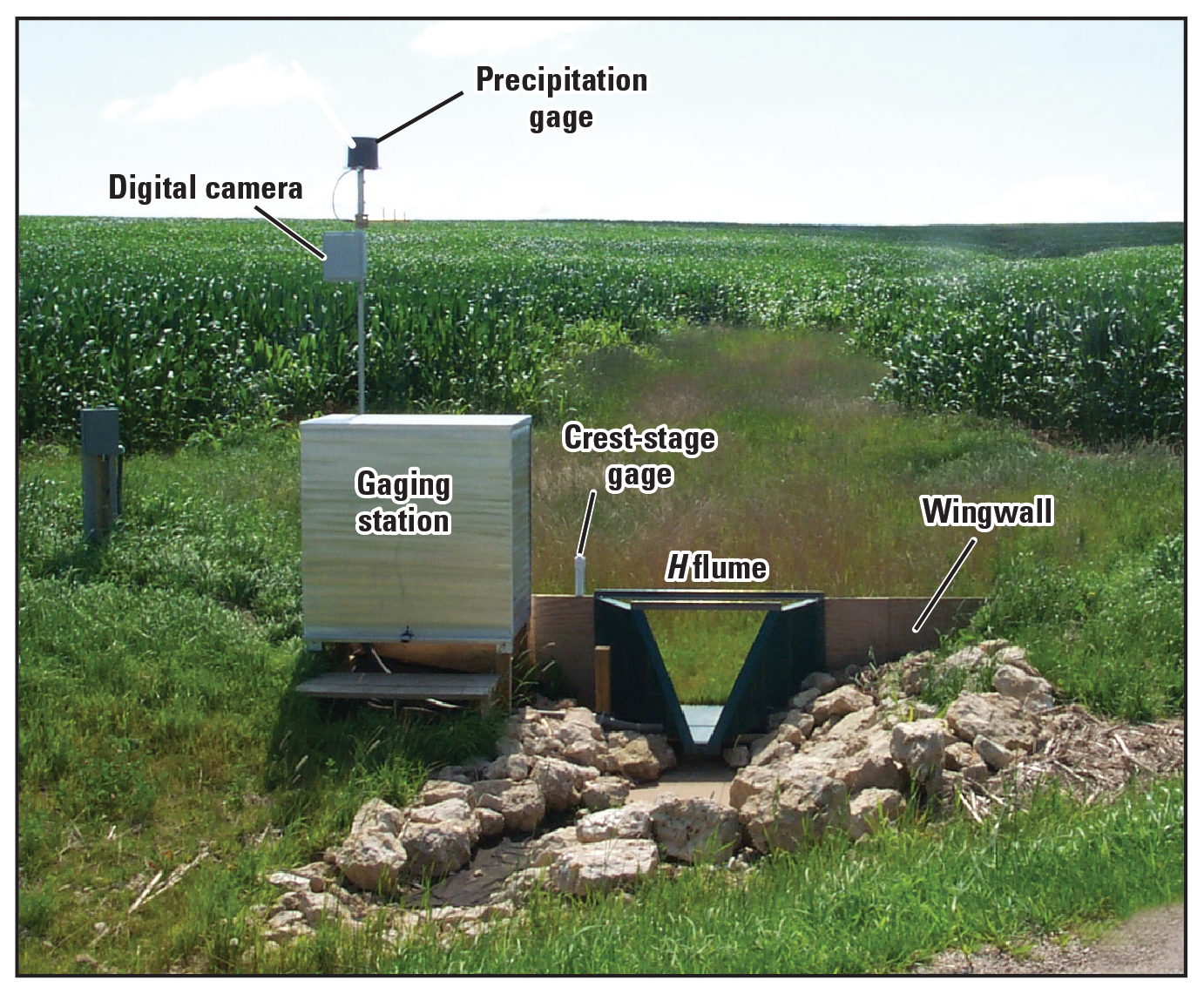
An Edge-of-Field Monitor studying nutrient pollution before it enters local waterways. Maumee watershed farmers voluntarily use monitors to mitigate runoff.

The USDA and NRCS utilize a voluntary Edge-of-Field Monitoring network across northwest Ohio's 4.5-million-acre (1.8 million ha) Maumee watershed. Installed at field edges, the equipment analyzes water from tile drains and surface runoff to measure nutrient loss.

The Ohio Department of Natural Resources (Ohio DNR), USDA, and NRCS assist farmers with windbreaks and other soil conservation methods to prevent wind erosion, thereby improving stream water quality. Erosion creates financial and nutrient losses for farmers, with one ton of valuable optimal soil containing 2 pounds (0.91 kg) of nitrogen, 9 pounds (4.1 kg) of phosphorus, and 31 pounds (14 kg) of potassium. Within 50 to 75 years, Ohio's muck farms will lose most of their original wetland soil to decomposition and wind.

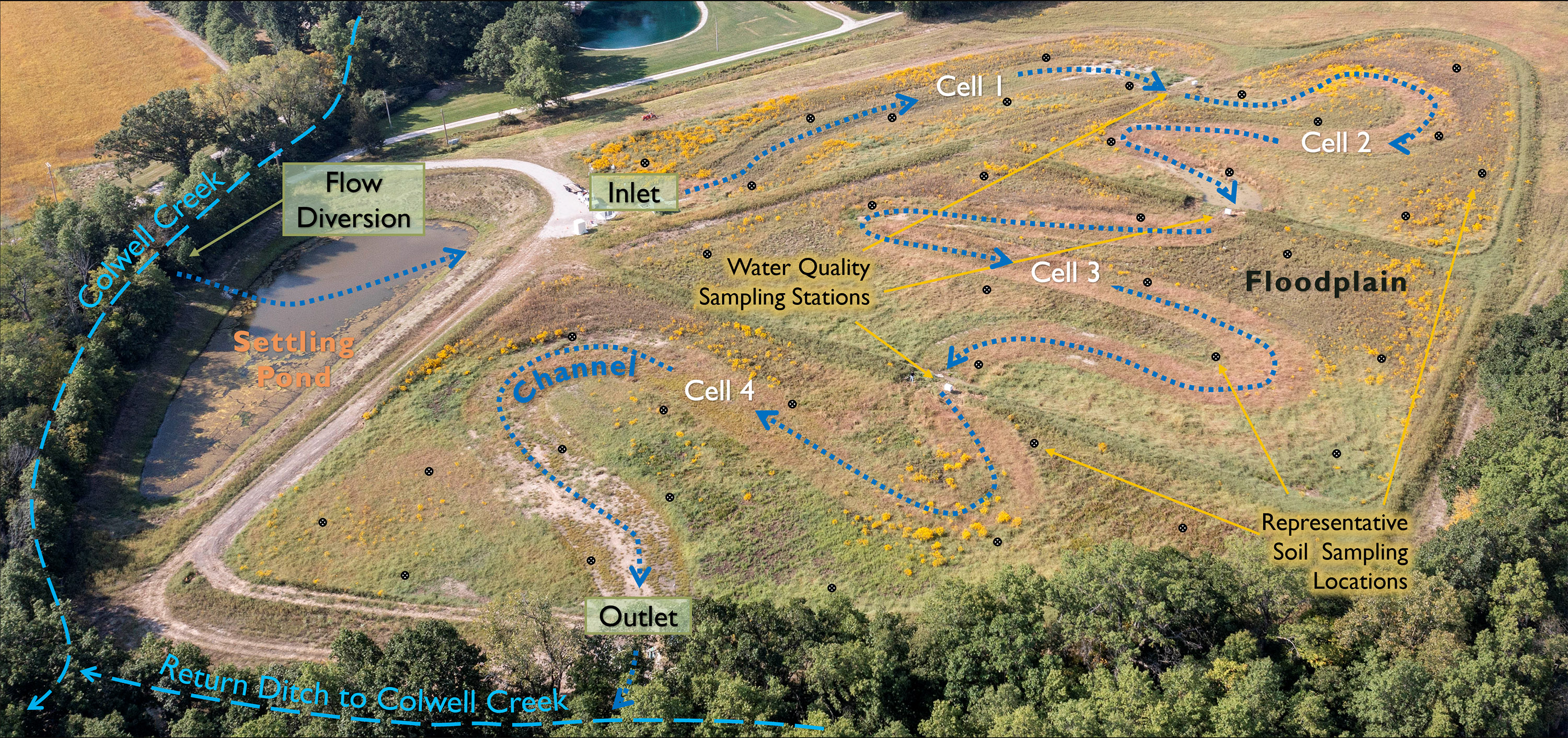
In Defiance, Ohio, the USACE and USGS built and manage a 10-acre demonstration wetland in the former Black Swamp to model agricultural phosphorus retention and filter legacy phosphorus from tributaries.

Industrial pollution, PCBs, and PAHs in the Ottawa and Maumee Rivers compromise water and public health. In 2024, five companies paid $7.2 million for polluting in the Maumee watershed. In 2025, Campbell's admitted to years of polluting the Maumee River. Contaminants of emerging concern also harm the environment, and cause population declines of threatened and endangered freshwater species.

Environmental advocates have criticized the Ohio EPA for failing to adequately regulate pollution from concentrated animal feeding operations (CAFOs). Agricultural groups have litigated, claiming Clean Water Act regulations inadequately address Lake Erie pollution, specifically from CAFOs. In the former Black Swamp region, CAFO expansion has increased nutrient loading, requiring improved manure and fertilizer management.

The International Joint Commission and various environmental stakeholders argue voluntary pollution prevention for farmers is insufficient, calling for mandatory regulations and enforcement penalties.

The Black Swamp was a major carbon sink until agriculture turned it into a carbon source, requiring mitigation of greenhouse gas emissions (GHG) like methane and nitrous oxide.

=== Wildlife conservation ===
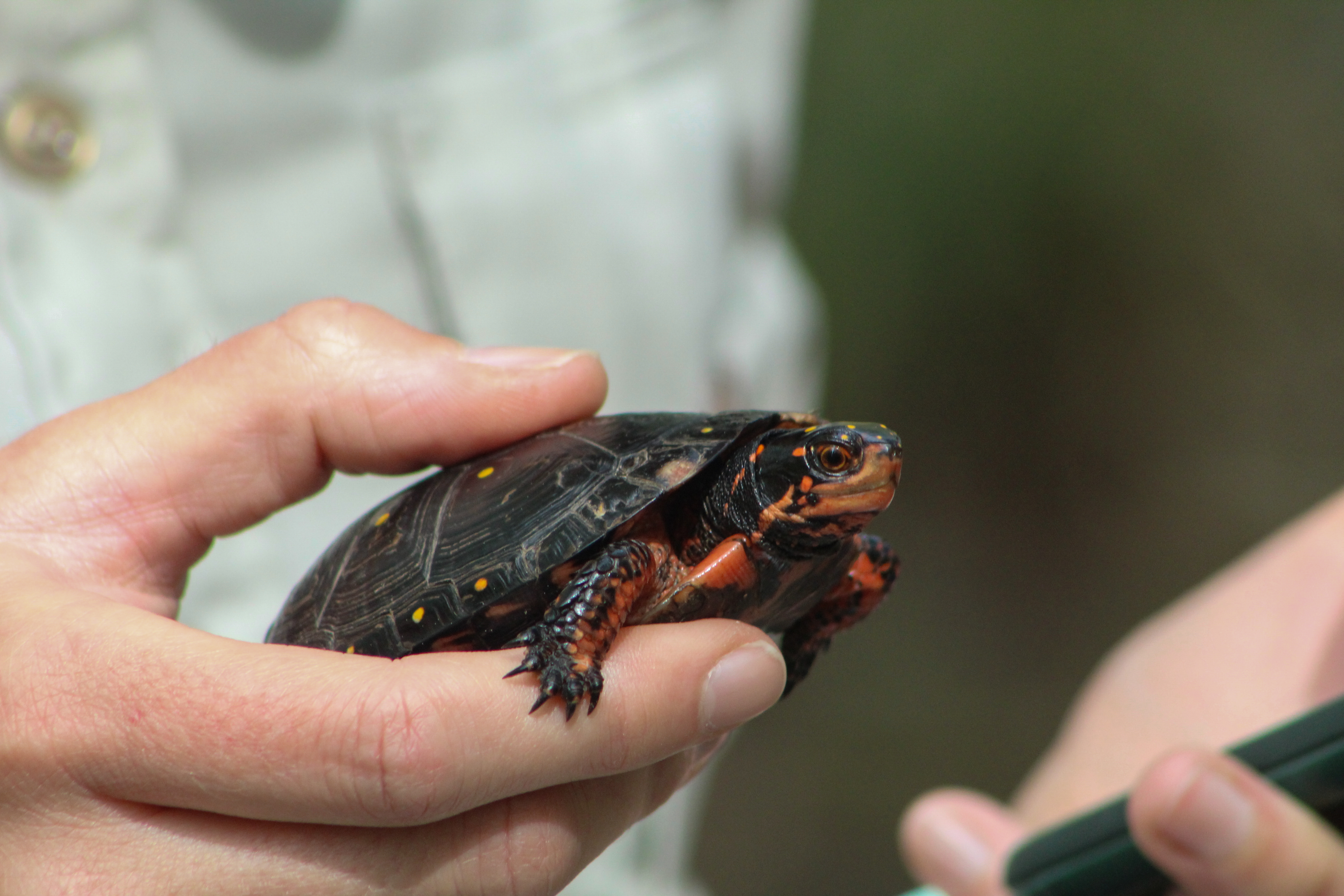
A Spotted turtle (Clemmys guttata). This species is listed by the Ohio Department of Natural Resources as threatened. Over 90% of Ohio's wetlands were erased in the 19th century. Continued habitat loss and illegal poaching threaten this species with extinction.

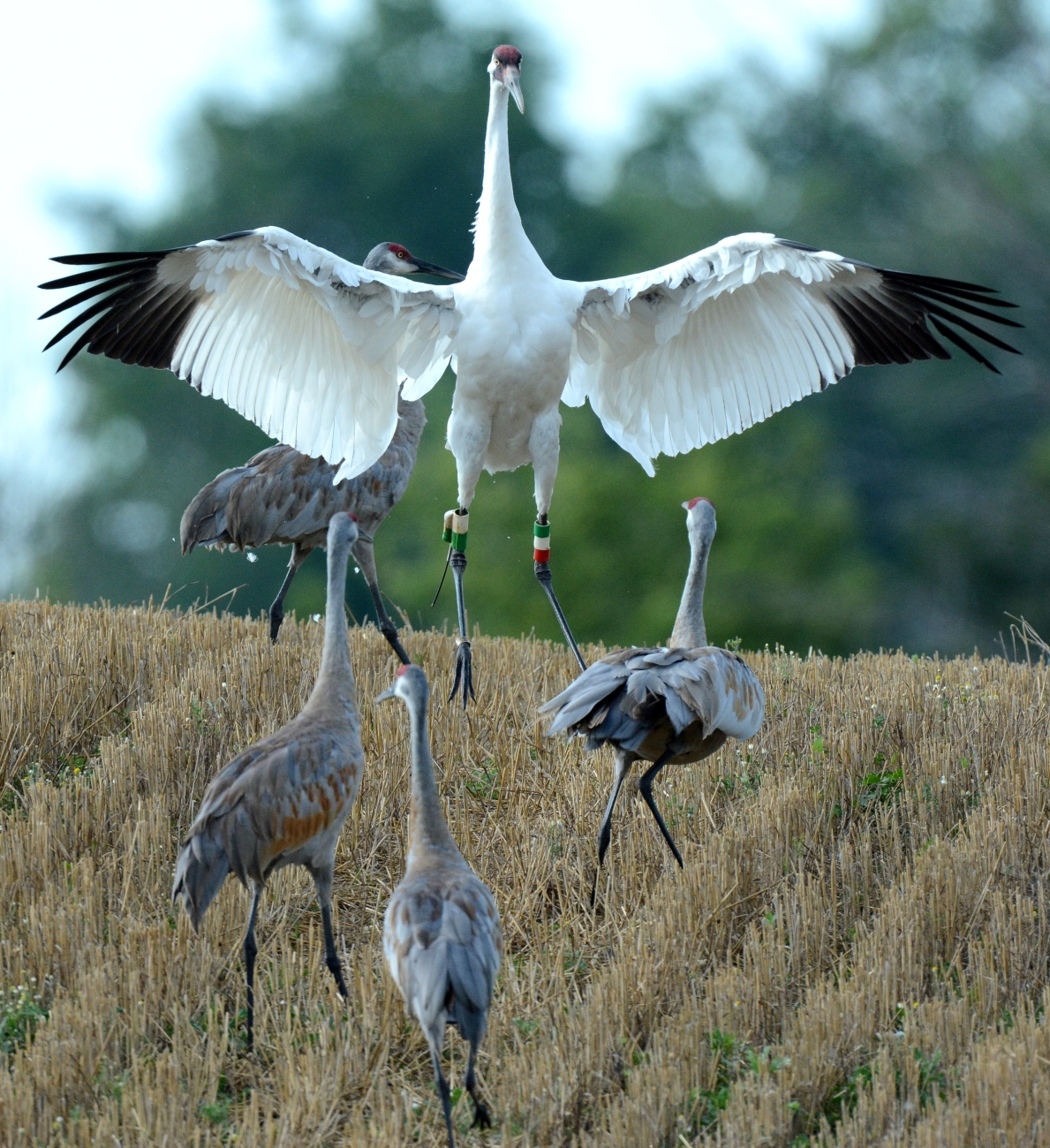
A Whooping crane (Grus americana) with Sandhill cranes (Antigone canadensis). They are rare in Ohio. The Ohio DNR lists sandhill cranes as threatened. The USFWS lists whooping cranes as endangered.

Biodiversity has suffered significantly due to the loss of the Great Black Swamp. Species threatened with extinction include the spotted turtle, which has declined significantly over the years. The copperbelly water snake has suffered significant population losses. Today, this species inhabits just 20 square miles (52 km^{2}) of remnant swamp forest in Ohio, Michigan, and Indiana, with experts estimating that only 40 to 100 individuals remain. The piping plover, the loggerhead shrike, and the northern harrier are other species that need protection, and are considered endangered in Ohio. Wetland conservation projects focus on restoring habitats to suit the needs of these species.

Black bears were extirpated in most of Ohio by the 1850s, and the last one in the Great Black Swamp (Paulding County) was killed by 1881. They were rediscovered in the State in the 1970s, having entered from Pennsylvania and West Virginia. The Ohio Department of Natural Resources (Ohio DNR) has been conducting surveys, estimating the current population at 50 to 100 bears. Most of the black bear sightings occur along the borders with Pennsylvania and West Virginia. Only four sightings were recorded between 1993 and 2022 in the former Great Black Swamp region (Fulton and Seneca counties). The Ohio DNR lists the black bear as an Endangered Species in Ohio and bans hunting them.

The sandhill crane was extirpated in Ohio by the early 20th century, but has slowly made a comeback. Most recently, the Ohio DNR, the International Crane Foundation, and the Ohio Bird Conservation Initiative counted 184 sandhill cranes across the former Great Black Swamp region (Fulton, Lucas, Ottawa, and Sandusky counties) during the 2023 and 2024 during nesting seasons. The Ohio DNR lists them as threatened.

Hunting and habitat loss decimated the whooping crane population in North America by the late 19th and early 20th centuries. The whooping crane was thought to have been a resident of the Great Black Swamp region, especially since it still uses the Mississippi Flyway. Despite the Ohio Bird Records Committee believing the species deserved inclusion on the Ohio list of historic bird species, its historic presence cannot be confirmed due to poor record keeping in the late 19th and early 20th centuries, including lost/destroyed photographs, documents, crane skins, and even cranes stuffed by taxidermists. Whooping cranes are rarely sighted today, either in the former swamp region or the rest of Ohio.

=== Indigenous peoples today ===
Indigenous nations forcibly removed from the Black Swamp region and relocated west of the Mississippi survived a series of harmful federal policies, including the Dawes Act, the 1956 Indian Relocation Act, and the mismanagement of reservations. Today, Indigenous groups in Ohio have sought historical recognition and cultural preservation, including the 2023 UNESCO recognition of the Hopewell Ceremonial Earthworks as a World Heritage Site, and also land purchases for Indigenous cultural activities. The 2024 WYSO podcast, The Ohio Country, documented efforts by tribal descendants to revive their languages and cultural bonds to Ohio.

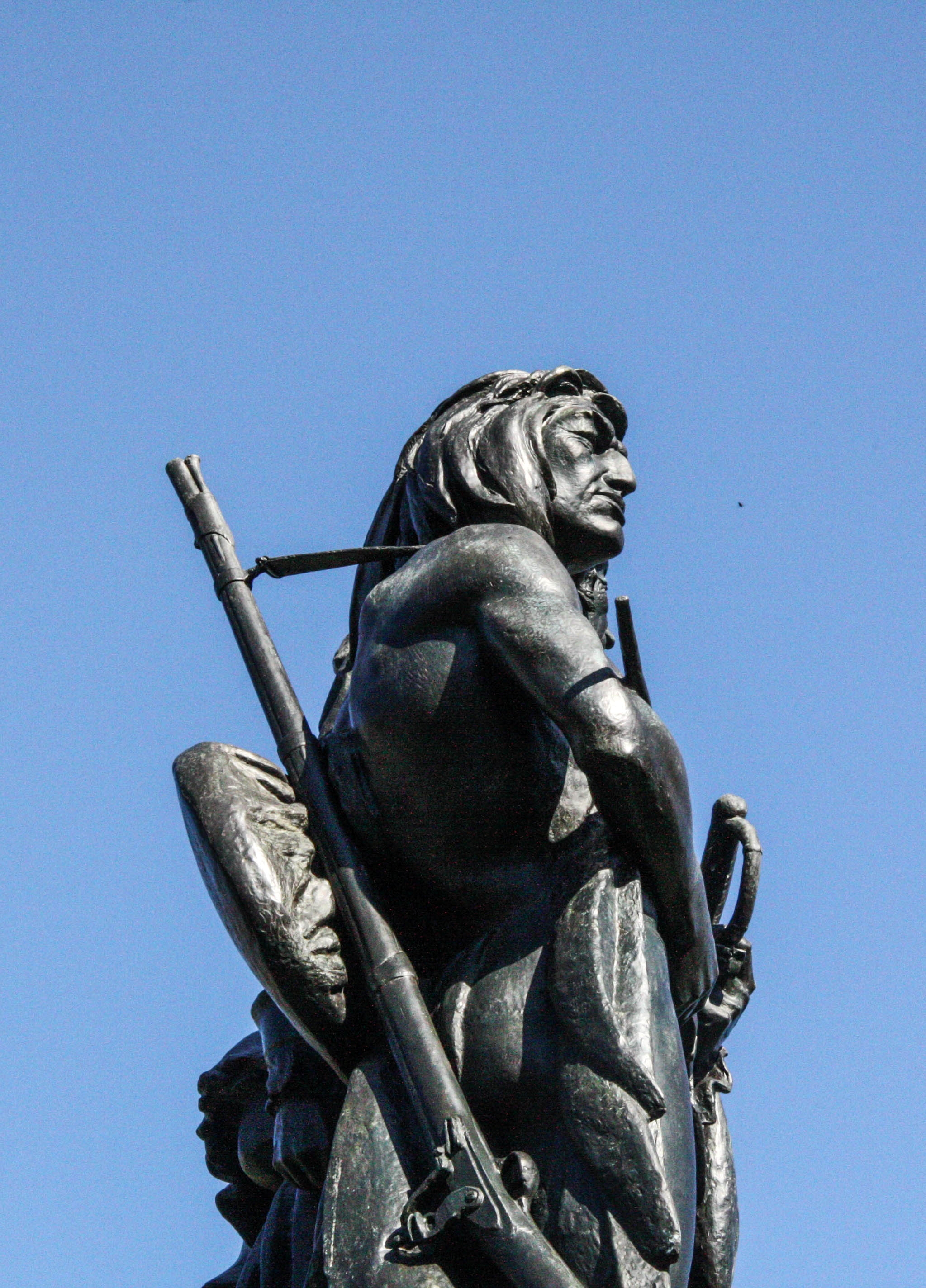
The American Indian statue at the Battle of Fallen Timbers Monument, Lucas County. Following defeat in the Northwest Indian War, exacerbated by British betrayal, Indigenous peoples lost ancestral lands and the Black Swamp to the U.S. government. Today, they continue to pursue legal rights, and work to preserve Ohio's Indigenous history.

Contemporary historians criticize historical misrepresentations of Ohio's Indigenous peoples, which focus on how pioneers altered the landscape without discussing genocidal violence. Historical denials include the 1982 WBGU-TV PBS documentary's false claim that Indigenous peoples abandoned the Black Swamp because they "disliked" it. Historical records confirm Indigenous nations did not willingly leave the swamp region; they were forcibly relocated by the U.S. government under the Indian Removal Act to Indian Territory west of the Mississippi. Even Charles Dickens noted the Wyandot's deep reluctance to leave their lands and their loved ones' graves when he met them in 1842. When the Wyandot arrived in Kansas in 1843, they learned they would not be fully paid for the lands they sold to the U.S. government, and that the land the government had promised them in Indian Territory did not exist.

In 1865, Mother Solomon and other Wyandots returned to northwest Ohio from Kansas' Wyandot territory following forced removal.

Efforts are underway in the 2020s to return an estimated 6,500 Indigenous remains in Ohio museums and collections to their respective nations for reburial, as mandated by the Native American Graves Protection and Repatriation Act (NAGPRA). Because of constant construction projects breaking ground, efforts to identify possible Indigenous graves are ongoing in northwest Ohio. In 2003, human bones dating to 1600 BCE (over 3,600 years old), found at an Ottawa County construction site in the former Great Black Swamp, were given a reburial ceremony led by four indigenous people from the Five States Alliance of First Americans.

NAGPRA's inventory reports the number of Indigenous individuals and funerary objects recovered from burial sites within the former Great Black Swamp region. They included the following Ohio counties: Allen (66 individuals, 20 funerary objects), Erie (215 individuals, 189 funerary objects), Fulton (13 individuals, 20 funerary objects), Hancock (2 individuals), Henry (3 individuals), Lucas (5 individuals, 2888 funerary objects), Ottawa (490 individuals, 6 funerary objects), Putnam (3 individuals), Sandusky (634 individuals, 1087 funerary objects), Williams (3 individuals), and Wood (41 individuals, 11 funerary objects). Defiance, Paulding, Seneca, and Van Wert counties were not included. They also included the following counties outside of Ohio: Allen County, Indiana (1 individual); and the Michigan counties of Lenawee (1 individual) and Monroe (3 individuals, 20 funerary objects). In March 2025, the National Park Service and the U.S. Department of the Interior reported on Indigenous human remains from Wood County, identifying at least 1,399 individuals and 4,661 associated funerary objects dating back centuries. One historian suggested hundreds, perhaps thousands, of burial sites remain undiscovered in the Lake Erie basin.

Indigenous nations from the Great Black Swamp and other Lake Erie regions suffered the psychological trauma of losing their ancestral lands and burial places. These graves were central to their cultural and spiritual beliefs, representing a sacred bond with their ancestors that was violently severed. This has contributed to their historical trauma. Education programs inform the public about the history of Indigenous peoples and the Great Black Swamp to help restore a more complete memory of Ohio's past.

== Legacy of the swamp ==
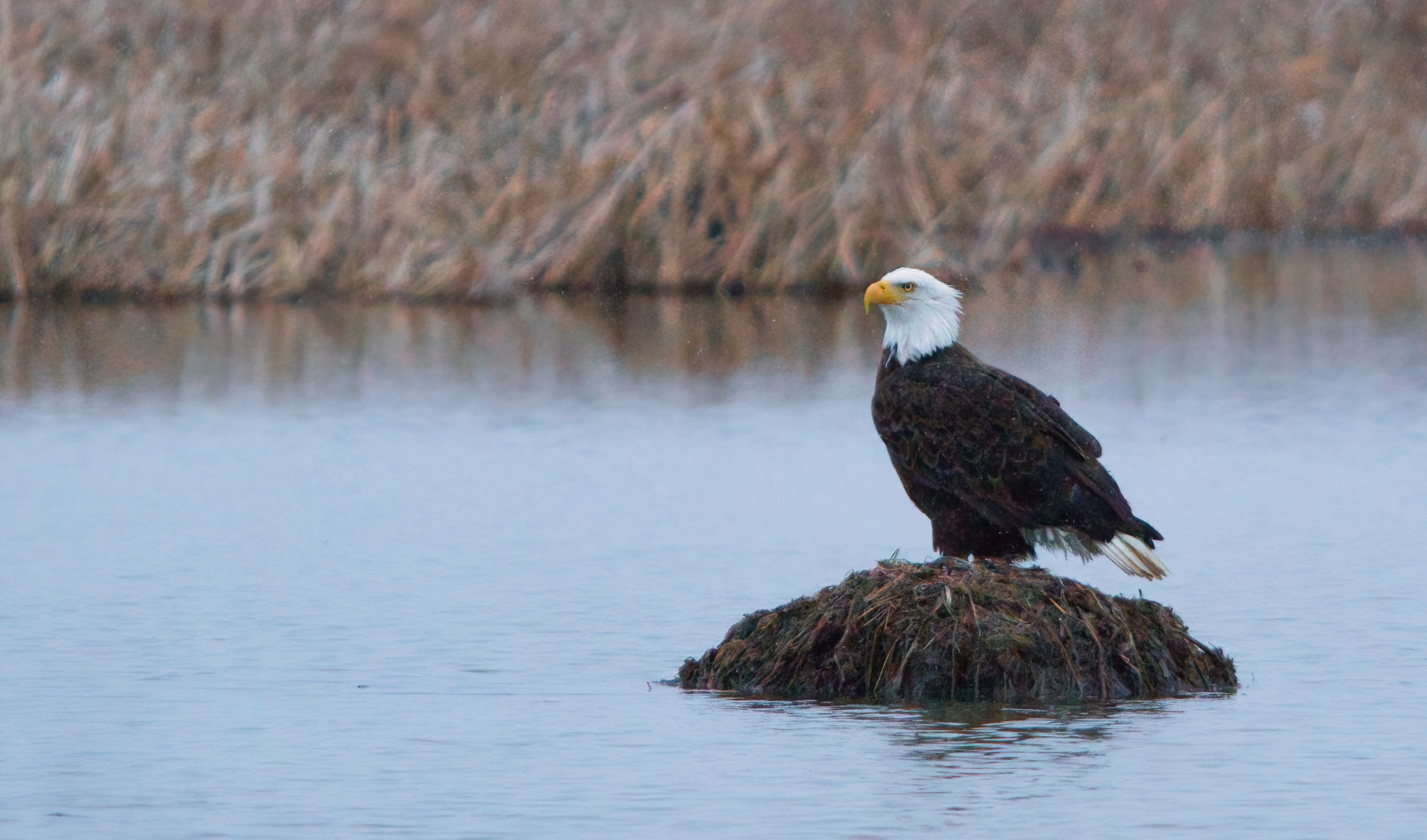
A bald eagle at Ottawa National Wildlife Refuge (NWR). This refuge and Cedar Point NWR exist within the former Black Swamp.

The Great Black Swamp ceased to exist in the 19th century. Its destruction and other wetland losses drive wetland conservation. Recent legal challenges, including the 2023 Supreme Court ruling in Sackett v. EPA, have created obstacles for U.S. wetland protection by focusing on private land-use rights.

Public perception about the Black Swamp has changed over time, scrutinizing bias, stereotypes, and historical denials. A 1982 WBGU-TV PBS documentary perpetuated misinformation about the Great Black Swamp by omitting many facts and eulogizing its destruction as a "heroic conquest." Historian Bruce E. McGarvey criticized the documentary for ignoring accurate history and focusing instead on exaggerated myths about the swamp.

The annual Black Swamp Arts Festival in Bowling Green is named in honor of the mega-wetland. Recent media about the swamp includes Patrick Wensink's book, The Great Black Swamp: Toxic Algae, Toxic Relationships, and the Most Interesting Place Nobody's Ever Heard Of. In 2025, PBS Western Reserve released a documentary about the Great Black Swamp and the importance of wetlands, stating, "the misunderstanding of what wetlands provide to nature poses the threat of continued loss."

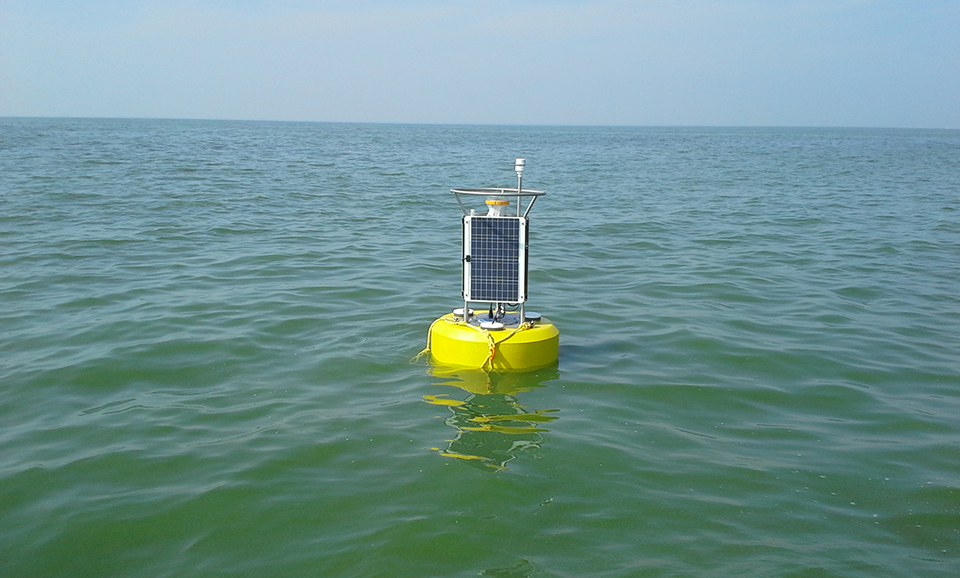
A buoy used for harmful algal bloom monitoring and research in the Western Basin of Lake Erie. This data helps scientists and Ohio communities forecast and prepare for harmful algal bloom events.

In 2024, the United States Fish and Wildlife Service (USFWS) alerted the public that U.S. wetland destruction has increased by 50% since 2009, and urged wetland conservation, stating, "wetland loss leads to the reduced health, safety and prosperity of all Americans". BGSU's Center for Great Lakes and Watershed Studies addresses critical water issues affecting Ohio, Lake Erie, and the former Great Black Swamp region. In October 2025, WBGU-TV PBS interviewed scientists from the center to discuss Ohio water protection, wetland restoration, and applying their research to global water issues.

As the shallowest and warmest of the Great Lakes, Lake Erie is experiencing more frequent harmful algal blooms (HABs). Increased organic nitrogen input encourages Microcystis blooms and toxin production. Rising temperatures are causing HABs to last longer.

To manage these threats, the National Oceanic and Atmospheric Administration (NOAA) monitors HABs, utilizing satellites, field observations, models, buoys, and public health reports. NOAA provides hypoxia forecasts to alert decision-makers to cold, hypoxic upwellings near the shore. Such comprehensive measures are essential due to the lack of wetlands and increasing pollution.

== See also ==
Destroyed wetlands

- Draining of the Mesopotamian Marshes
- The Fens
- Grand Kankakee Marsh
- Great Meadow, Ukraine
- Limberlost Swamp
- Tulare Lake

Living or restored wetlands

- Atchafalaya Basin
- Blackwater National Wildlife Refuge
- Carolina bays
- Cuvette Centrale
- Everglades
- Great Cypress Swamp
- Great Dismal Swamp
- Great Swamp National Wildlife Refuge
- Kopuatai Peat Dome
- Mer Bleue Bog
- Okefenokee Swamp
- Pantanal
- Pocosin
- Sundarbans
