= Turnpike Lands =

Coordinates: 40°48′30″N 82°58′32″W

Turnpike Lands were a group of land tracts granted by the United States Congress to the state of Ohio in 1827 along the path of a proposed road in the northwest corner of the state.

== History ==
With the Treaty of Greenville in 1795 the Indian Nations ceded southern and eastern Ohio to white settlement. The Treaty of Fort Industry in 1805 moved the boundary westward to a line 120 miles (190 km) west of Pennsylvania, which coincided with the western boundary of the Firelands of the Connecticut Western Reserve. In 1807, the Treaty of Detroit called for the cession of lands northwest of the Maumee River, in Ohio, and mostly in the Michigan Territory. The area between the Maumee River and the 1805 boundary remained Indian Lands, and thus, the United States could not legally build a road connecting settlements in Ohio and the Michigan Territory. This area was also swampy, and would require much engineering effort and funds to cross with a road.

On November 25, 1808, at Brownstown in Michigan Territory, the United States and five nations of Indians signed the Treaty of Brownstown. Article II of the treaty called for the Indian Nations to cede to the United States "…also a tract of land, for a road only, of one hundred twenty feet in weadth, to run southwardly from what is called Lower Sandusky, to the boundary line established by the Treaty of Greenville, with the privilege of taking at all times, such timber and other materials, from the adjacent lands as may be necessary for making and keeping in repair the said road, with the bridges that may be required along the same."

Lower Sandusky is now called Fremont, Ohio and the boundary line of the Greenville Treaty lies in southern Marion County.

Nothing was accomplished by Congress, so in 1820, the Ohio legislature asked Congress to take action.

All the land between the Maumee River and the Western Reserve was ceded by the Indians with the Treaty of Fort Meigs in 1817, and surveyed into townships and sections in the Congress Lands South and East of the First Principal Meridian in 1819, and North and East of the First Principal Meridian in 1821.

== Grant by Congress ==
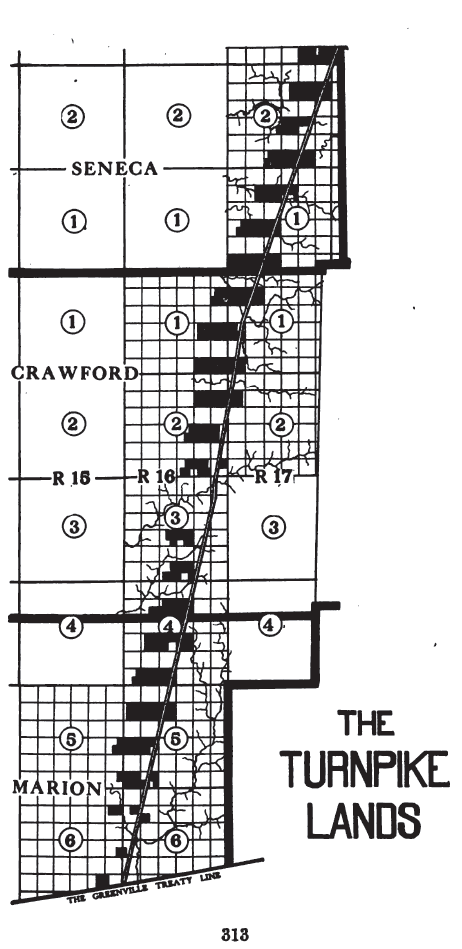
The Turnpike Lands in northwest Ohio

It became more desirable to run a road to Sandusky City on Lake Erie rather than Fremont. In 1827, and clarified in 1828, Congress granted to the state of Ohio "forty-nine sections of land to be located in the Delaware Land District, in the following manner, to-wit: Every alternate section through which the road may run, and the section next adjoining thereto on the west, so far as the said sections remain unsold, and, if any part of the sections shall have been disposed of, then a quantity equal thereto shall be selected by the Commissioner of the General Land Office, from the vacant lands in the sections adjoining on the west of those appropriated."

The road was constructed by the Columbus and Sandusky Turnpike Company. The grant of 31,596.09 acres (127.8648 km^{2}) was declared for the use and benefit of the turnpike company by the state legislature in 1828 for the purpose of building the road, and authorized the company to sell the land and the governor to execute the deeds to the purchasers.

Ohio State Route 4 north of Bucyrus in Seneca and Crawford counties, and Ohio State Route 98 south of Bucyrus in Crawford and Marion counties are situated along the path of the Columbus and Sandusky Turnpike where the 1828 grant was made.

== See also ==
- Ohio Lands
