= Maumee Road Lands =

Maumee Road Lands were a group of land tracts granted by the United States Congress to the state of Ohio in 1823 along the path of a proposed road in the northwest corner of the state.

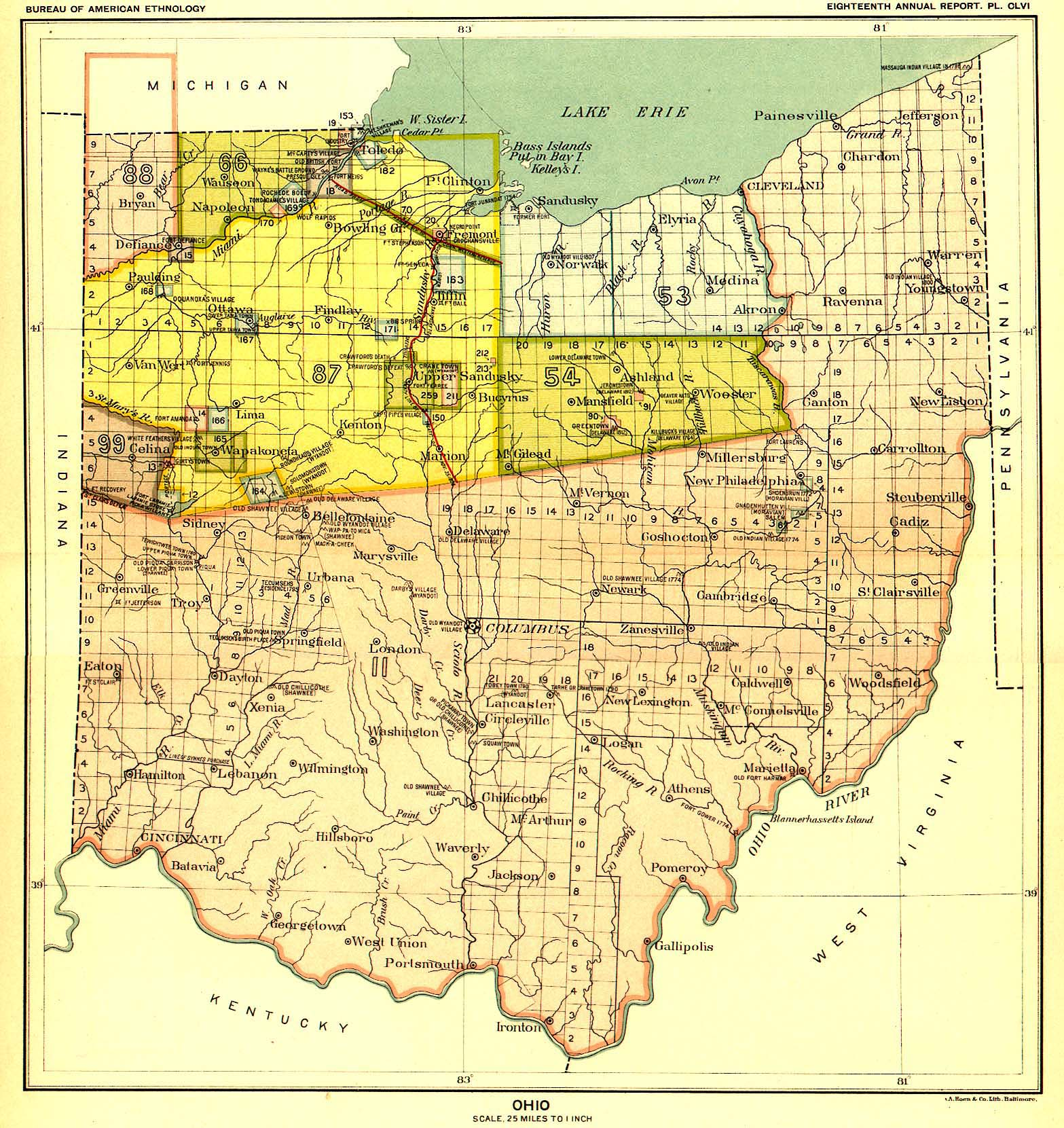
The Maumee Road is the dark line in northwest Ohio between the western edge of the Firelands and the Maumee River

== History ==
With the Treaty of Greenville in 1795 the Indian nations ceded southern and eastern Ohio to white settlement. The Treaty of Fort Industry in 1805 moved the boundary westward to a line 120 miles (190 km) west of Pennsylvania, which coincided with the western boundary of the Firelands of the Connecticut Western Reserve. In 1807 the Treaty of Detroit called for the cession of lands northwest of the Maumee River, mostly in the Michigan Territory. The area between the Maumee and the 1805 boundary remained Indian lands, and thus the United States could not legally build a road connecting settlements in Ohio and the Michigan Territory. This area was also in the Great Black Swamp and would require much engineering effort and funds to cross with a road.

On November 25, 1808, at Brownstown in Michigan Territory, the United States and five nations of Indians signed the Treaty of Brownstown. Article II of the treaty called for the Indian nations to cede to the United States a tract of land two miles (3 km) wide from Perrysburg, Ohio, on the Maumee to Bellevue, Ohio, on the western edge of the Western Reserve so the United States could build a road 120 feet (37 m) wide to connect their disconnected lands.

In 1811, Congress appropriated $6,000 to explore, survey and mark a road 60 feet wide. In 1815 Congress made provisions to survey the lands one mile (1.6 km) either side of the road path into tracts running parallel and perpendicular to path of the road, and sell them at the Canton land office. In 1816 authorization was given to move the path of the road to pass through Fremont. No action was taken on these counts, so in 1820 the Ohio legislature asked Congress to take action.

All the land between the Maumee River and the Western Reserve was ceded by the Indians with the Treaty of Fort Meigs in 1817, and surveyed into townships and sections in the Congress Lands North and East of the First Principal Meridian in 1821.

== Grant by Congress ==
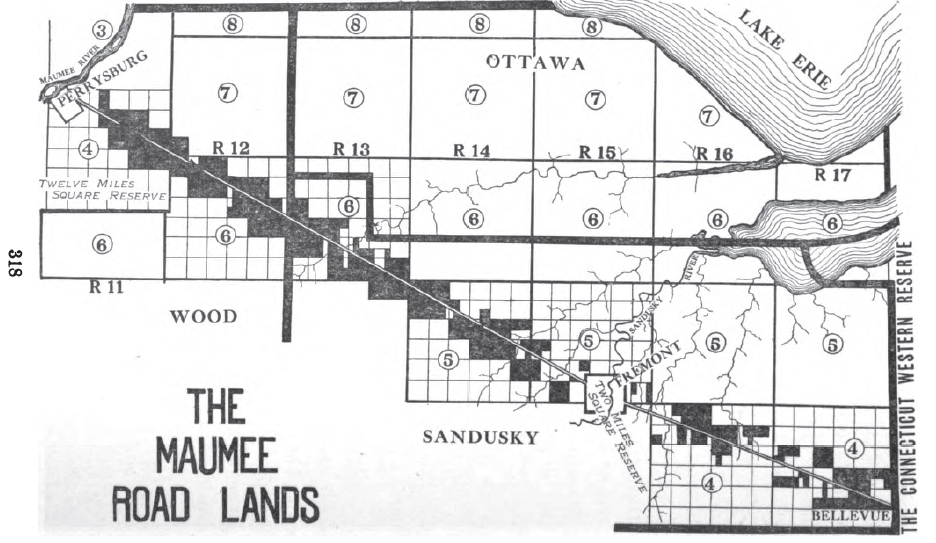
The Maumee Road Lands in northwest Ohio

In 1823 Congress authorized the state of Ohio to build the road and granted land to the state 120 feet (37 m) wide, plus one mile (1.6 km) on each side of the road, bounded by sectional lines. This grant became known as the “Maumee Road Lands“. In 1825 Ohio appropriated funds to build the road and provided for sale of granted lands to pay for it. The section of road is about 46 miles (74 km) long, and the land granted to Ohio amounted to about 60,000 acres (240 km^{2}) in Wood and Sandusky counties.

United States Route 20 is situated along the Maumee road.

== See also ==
- Ohio Lands
