= Indian Land Grants =

The Indian Land Grants are scattered about the yellow and pink areas in Northwest Ohio

Indian Land Grants were land tracts granted to various Indians (Indigenous peoples of North America) by Treaty or by United States Congressional action in the Nineteenth century in northwestern Ohio.

== Grants near St. Mary's River ==
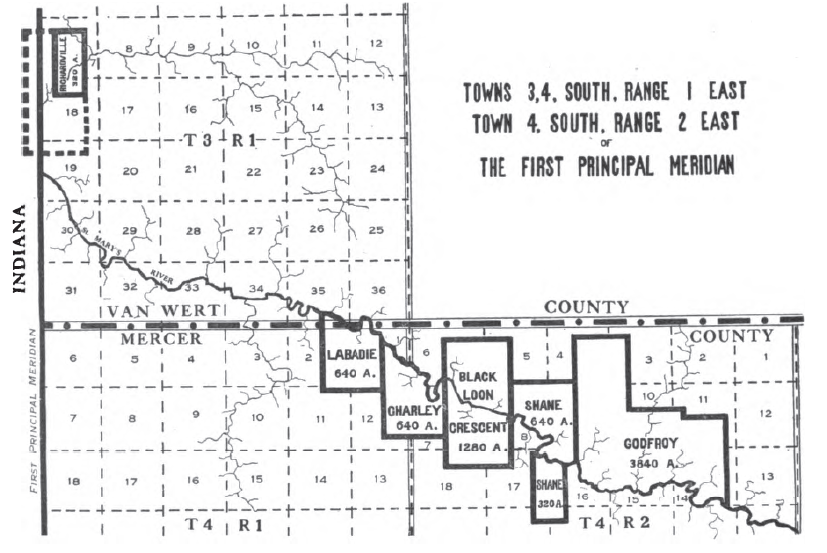
Indian Land Grants near the St. Mary's River

=== Jean Baptiste Richardville ===
Jean Baptiste Richardville was principal chief of the Miami tribe. He was granted tracts of land by the 1818 Treaty of St. Mary's. In Ohio, Article 3 granted "Two sections, on the Twenty-seven mile creek, where the road from St. Mary's to Fort Wayne crosses it, being one section on each side of said creek." This tract was partially in Township 27 North Range 15 East of the Second Principal Meridian in Adams County, Indiana, and part in T3S of R1E of the First Principal Meridian in Van Wert County, Ohio.

=== Peter Labadie ===
In Article 3 of the Treaty of St. Mary's, Peter Labadie was granted 640 acres of land on the St. Mary's River in Van Wert County, Ohio and Mercer County, Ohio in T3S R1E and T4S R1E of the First Principal Meridian.

=== Charley ===
A Miami chief named Charley was granted 640 acres of land on the west side of the St. Mary's river by Article 3 of the Treaty of St. Mary's. It was located in T4S R1E and T4S R2E of the First Principal Meridian in Mercer County, Ohio.

=== Black Loon Crescent ===
A survey on the St. Mary's river is known as Black Loon Crescent. In Article 3 of the Treaty of St. Mary's, Black Loon, or Macultamunqua, was granted 640 acres on the north side of the river, while Crescent, or Wemetche, was granted 640 acres on the opposite side. The survey is in T4S R2E of the First Principal Meridian.

=== Anthony Shane ===
Anthony Shane, a man of mixed European and Ottawa parentage, lived along the St. Mary's river prior to the War of 1812 at his place of business known as Shane's Crossing. For his services to the United States during that war, in 1815 Congress granted him 320 acres on the south side of the river at his home. In the Treaty of Fort Meigs, he was granted an additional 640 acres on the opposite side of the river. This tract is in Dublin Township, Mercer County, Ohio, T4S R2E of the First Principal Meridian.

=== Louis Godfroy ===
The Treaty of St. Mary's granted Louis Godfroy six sections, (3840 acres), upstream of the Shane tracts on the St. Mary's river. This is in T4S R2E of the First Principal Meridian, in Mercer County.

== Grants on the Auglaize River ==
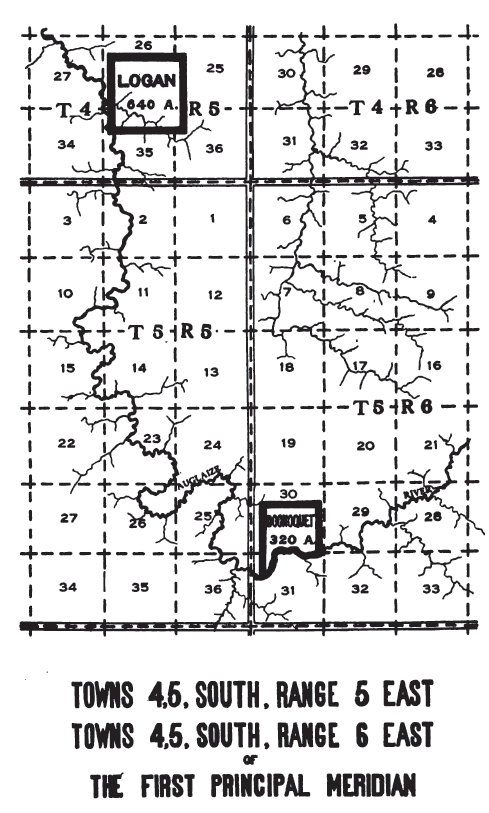
Indian Land Grants on the Auglaize River

=== Captain Logan ===
In 1786, during Logan's Raid, General Benjamin Logan of Kentucky took a number of hostages, including a Shawnee youngster named Spemica Lawba, who came to be known as Captain Logan. He was later exchanged and returned to his own people, and became a chief. He scouted for the Americans in the War of 1812 and died after a skirmish. The Treaty of Fort Meigs granted Captain Logan's surviving children 640 acres on the east side of the Auglaize River, T4S R5E of the First Principal Meridian, in Auglaize County, Ohio.

=== Francis Duchouquet ===
On June 23, 1836, Congress enacted "An Act for the relief of Henry Stoddard", who was assignee of Nicholas Smith, assignee of Francis Duchouquet, authorizing a patent for 320 acres in sections 30 and 31 of T5S R6E of the First Principal Meridian, in accordance with a grant to the chiefs of the Shawnee Nation in Section XI of the Treaty of Wapakoneta. Duchouquet Township in Auglaize County, which contains the land grant, is named for Francis Duchouquet.

== Grants on the Greenville Treaty Line ==
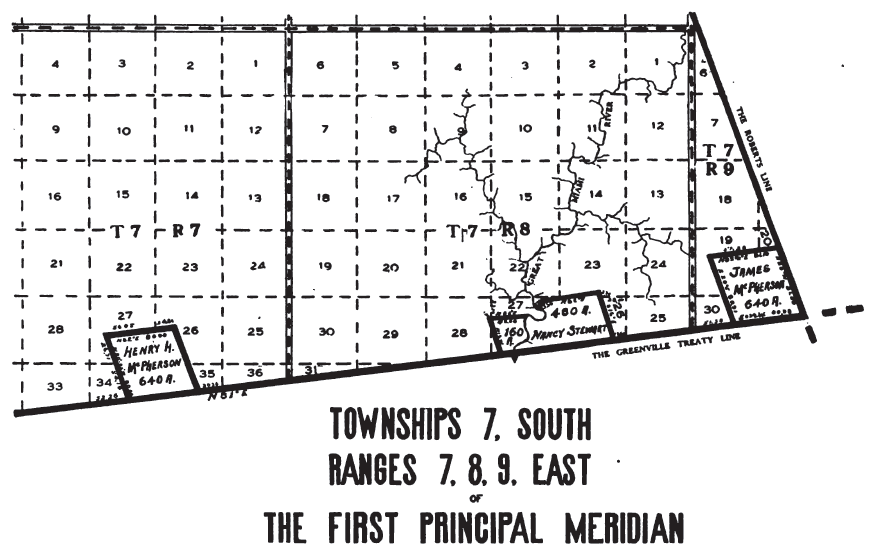
Indian Land Grants next to the Greenville Treaty Line

=== James McPherson ===
McPherson was a native of Carlisle, Pennsylvania who was taken prisoner by Indians, and had continued to live with them. In the Treaty of Fort Meigs, he was granted 640 acres, which he located at the intersection of the Roberts line with the Greenville Treaty Line, T7S R9E of First Principal Meridian. In the 1831 Treaty of Lewistown, Article XII granted 320 acres adjacent.

=== Nancy Stewart ===
The Treaty of Fort Meigs granted 640 acres to Nancy Stewart, daughter of the late Blue Jacket. 480 acres on the east side of the Great Miami River adjacent to the Greenville Treaty Line, and 160 acres of the west side, in T7S R8E of the First Principal Meridian.

=== Henry H. McPherson ===
Henry McPherson was an adopted son of the Seneca and Shawnee. In the Treaty of Wapakoneta, Article XIII granted him 320 acres adjacent to 320 acres he had been granted by the chiefs on March 20, 1821, in Shelby County, Ohio in T7S R7E of the First Principal Meridian.

== Grants on the Sandusky River ==
Grants on the Sandusky River
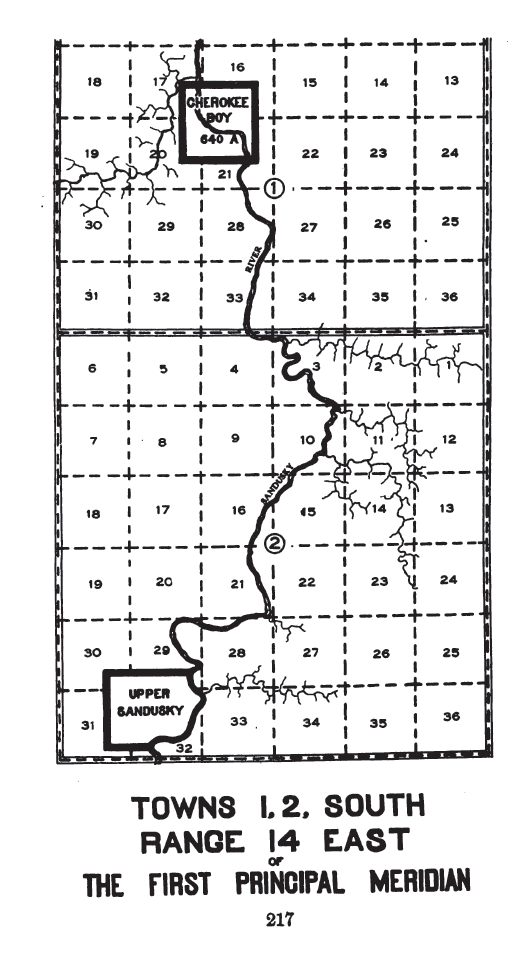
Upper Sandusky

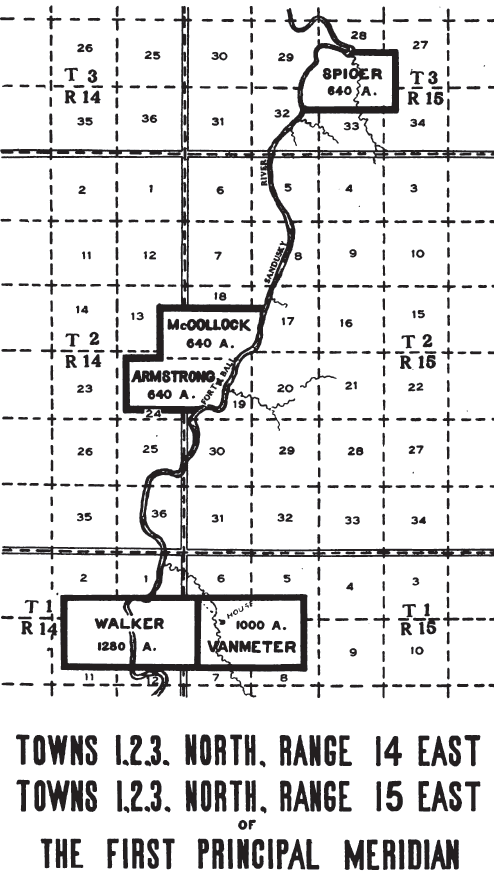
Middle Sandusky

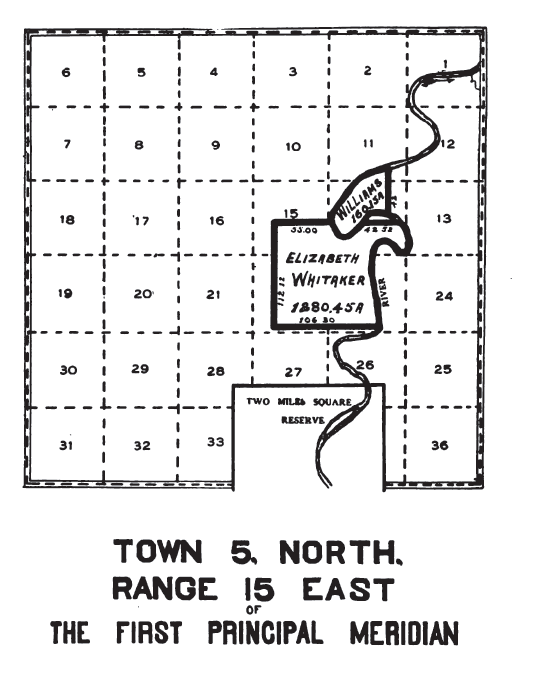
Lower Sandusky

=== Horonu ===
Horonu, also known as The Cherokee Boy, was a Wyandot chief. In the 1817 Treaty of Fort Meigs, he was granted 640 acres "on the Sandusky River, to be laid off in a square form, and to include his improvements." This land is located in Wyandot County, Ohio, in T1S R14E of the First Principal Meridian.

=== John Vanmeter ===
John Vanmeter was married to a Seneca woman, and lived near the Sandusky River. He and his wife's three brothers were granted 1000 acres around his home by the Treaty of Fort Meigs. This tract is located in T1N R15E of the First Principal Meridian.

=== John R. Walker ===
John R. Walker was the son of Catherine Walker, a Wyandot woman. He was wounded while fighting for the United States at the Battle of Maguaga during the War of 1812. In the Treaty of Fort Meigs, Walker and his mother were each awarded 640 acres adjacent to the west of John Vanmeter's tract, in T1N R14E of the First Principal Meridian.

=== Robert Armstrong ===
Robert Armstrong was a white man married to a Wyandot woman. The Treaty of Fort Meigs granted him 640 acres on the west side of the Sandusky river. This tract is located in T2N R14E and T2N R15E of the First Principal Meridian.

=== William McCollock ===
The quarter blood Wyandot children of William McCollock, who was killed at the Battle of Maguaga, were granted 640 acres adjacent north to the Armstrong grant by the Treaty of Fort Meigs.

=== William Spicer ===
William Spicer was a white man married to a Seneca woman. The Treaty of Fort Meigs granted him 640 acres on the east side of the Sandusky river around his home. This tract is in T3N R15E of the First Principal Meridian.

=== Elizabeth Whitaker ===
Elizabeth Whitaker was a white woman taken prisoner by the Wyandots who continued to live among them. The Treaty of Fort Meigs granted her 1280 acres on the west side of the Sandusky River around her home downstream from Croghansville. This tract is in T5N R15E of the First Principal Meridian in Sandusky County, Ohio.

=== Sarah Williams ===
Sarah Williams was a white widow of a half Wyandot named Isaac Williams. She and her two children were granted in the Treaty of Fort Meigs 160 acres on the east side of the Sandusky river at a place downstream of Fremont that was then called Negro Point. This tract is in Sandusky County in T5N R15E of the First Principal Meridian.

== Grants on the Maumee river ==
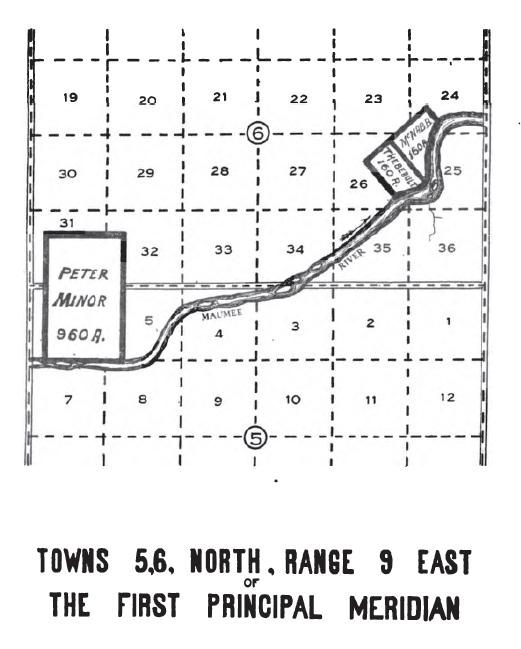
Indian Land Grants on the Maumee River

=== Peter Minor ===
Peter Minor, also known as Yellow Hair or Sawendebans, was adopted son of Tondaganie, or the Dog. He was granted 640 acres by the Treaty of Fort Meigs on the north of the Maumee River at Wolf Rapid. Article XV of the August 30, 1831 Treaty with the Ottawa granted 320 additional acres adjacent to the north to Minor's children. The 960 acres is one survey in T5N R9E and T6N R9E of the First Principal Meridian in Lucas County, Ohio.

=== H Thebault and W McNabb ===
Article XIV of the August 30, 1831 Treaty with the Ottawa granted Hiram Thebault, a half Ottawa, 160 acres around his home on the north bank of the Maumee river at Bear Rapids, and William McNabb, also half Ottawa, an adjacent 160-acre tract. These surveys are in T6N R9E of the First Principal Meridian.

== Maumee Bay Grants ==
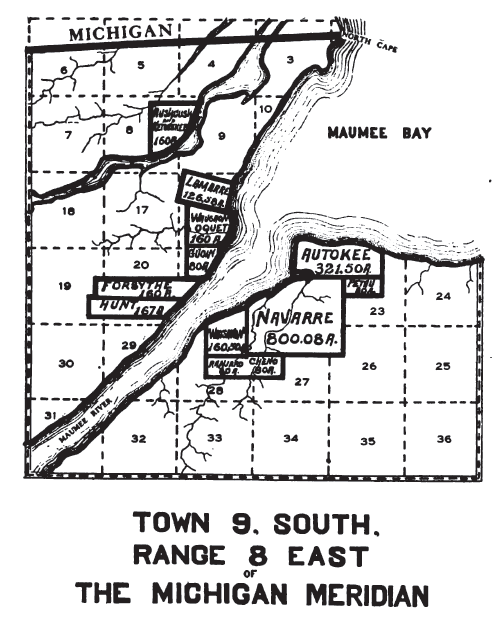
Indian Land Grants near the Maumee Bay

With the February 18, 1833 Treaty with the Ottawa, Article II made a number of grants around the Maumee Bay, where the Maumee River enters Lake Erie:

On the south side of the river, a 1520-acre tract was set aside. Autokee, a chief, was granted 320 acres, including Presque Isle. 800 acres were granted to Jacques, Robert, Peter, Antoine, Francis, and Alexis Navarre. 160 acres were granted to Wasayon, son of Tushquaguan, to include his father's home. Also eighty acres for Petau, around her cabin, eighty for Cheno, a chief, and eighty for Joseph La Cavalier Rajnard were granted.

On the north side of the river were awarded several grants. Wausaonoquet, a chief, was granted 160 acres where Pike Creek enters the bay. Leon Guoin was granted eighty acres adjacent to the south. 160 acres were granted to Aushcush and Ketuckkee on the north side of the Ottawa Creek where Aushcush lived. Robert A. Forsythe of Maumee was granted two 160-acre tracts, and John E. Hunt was also granted two 160-acre tracts.

Andre Lamarre was granted 126.58 acres on the north side of Maumee Bay by Congress on July 3, 1812.

All the Maumee Bay grants were in T9S R8E of the Michigan Meridian in Lucas County.
