= North and East of First Principal Meridian =

Coordinates: 41°05′N 83°45′W

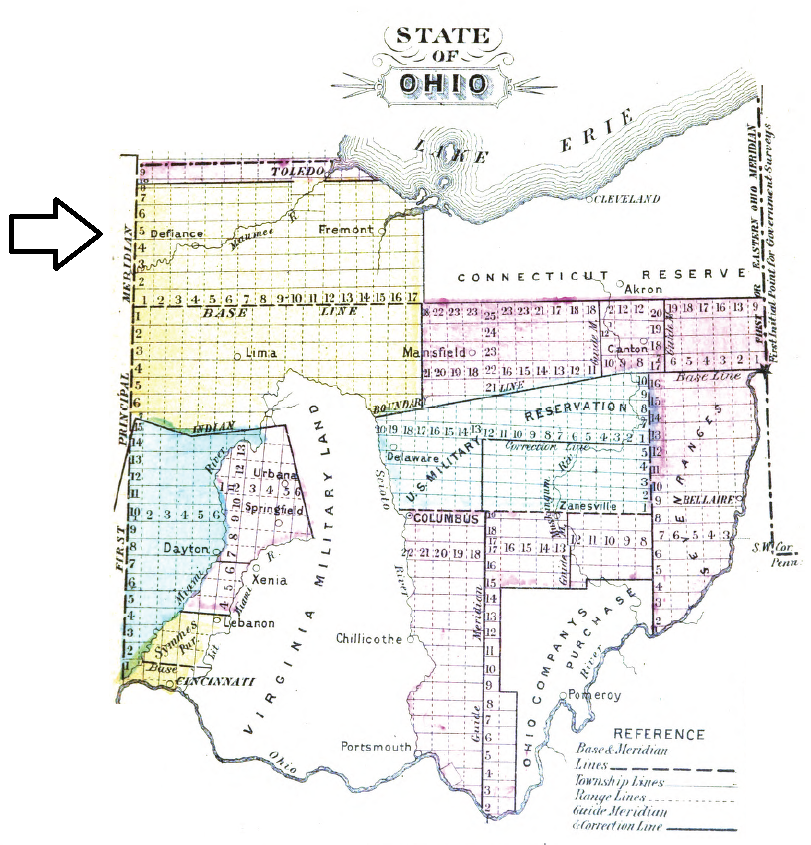
Arrow points to tract

North and East of the First Principal Meridian is a survey and land description in the northwest part of the U.S. state of Ohio.

== Survey ==
In 1812, Congress authorized the Surveyor General to survey the northern and western border of Ohio “as soon as the consent of the Indians can be obtained.“ In 1817, the northern portion of the Ohio-Indiana border was surveyed and became known as the First Principal Meridian for lands surveyed in the northwest part of Ohio. Most of the lands in Ohio north of the line determined by the Greenville Treaty in 1795 and west of the line determined by the Treaty of Fort Industry in 1805 had been ceded by Indians by 1818 and needed to be surveyed before they could be sold. Lands were surveyed into squares six mile (10 km) on a side called survey townships arranged in a checkerboard pattern, each subdivided into 36 one square mile sections, according to the methods of the Public Land Survey System. The 41st parallel north latitude became the base line. The townships were counted going north from the baseline in vertical rows called ranges. The ranges were counted from one in the west increasing to the east. The sections in each township were numbered in a boustrophedonical sequence according to the Act of May 18, 1796

The Congress Lands lying east of the meridian, north of the base line, and south of the border with the Michigan Territory at the time were surveyed in 1820-21.

== Exclusions ==
Two military reserves ceded by the Treaty of Greenville of twelve miles square, and two miles square had previously been surveyed, and were not included in the survey. A number of tracts that Native Americans had gained by treaty or Congressional action had also previously been indiscriminately surveyed. At the time Michigan was admitted as a state, the northern boundary of Ohio was moved a few miles further north. These lands between the old and new boundary, called the Toledo Strip, retained their original Michigan Survey based on the Michigan Meridian and baseline.

== Land Sales ==
The Act of March 3, 1819 established the Piqua Land District, with a Land Office in that town for sale of lands in this survey within 48 miles (77 km) of the state of Indiana. For lands in this survey more than 48 miles (77 km) from Indiana, a land office and land district were established at Delaware. The Piqua office was moved to ”Wapaughkoneta“, then, on March 3, 1835, to Lima, and finally, on March 3, 1843, to a consolidated land district at Upper Sandusky. Sales were also conducted from the nation’s capital at the United States General Land Office. Local offices were eventually closed. The State of Ohio also eventually sold lands granted to them by the federal government, such as section 16 of each township, and the Maumee Road Lands.

== Modern Time ==
The survey tract includes all, or parts of Paulding, Defiance, Williams, Fulton, Henry, Putnam, Hancock, Wood, Lucas, Ottawa, Sandusky, Seneca, and Erie counties.

== See also ==
- Ohio Lands
- South and East of the First Principal Meridian
- Historic regions of the United States
