= Congress Lands West of Miami River =

Coordinates: 39°35′N 84°38′W

The Congress Lands West of Miami River are the pink area labeled 1798 in far lower left

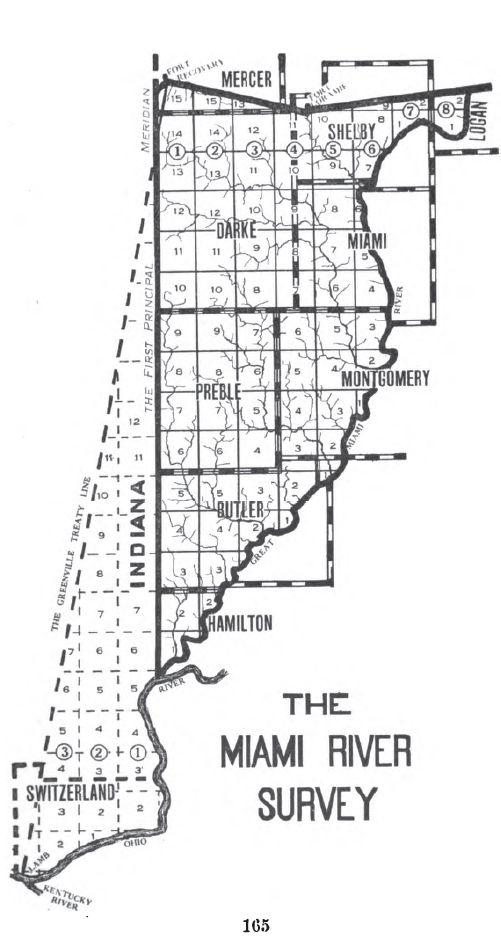
The Congress Lands West of Miami River

The Congress Lands West of Miami River was a land tract in southwest Ohio that was established by the Congress late in the 18th century. It is located south of the Greenville Treaty Line, east of Indiana, and north of the Great Miami River. The original survey in 1798 contained a triangular shaped slice of land, now located in Indiana, that extended to the Greenville line as it ran from Fort Recovery to opposite the mouth of the Kentucky River.

== History ==
In 1787, lands in the Ohio Country east of the Great Miami River were sold by the Continental Congress to Judge John Cleves Symmes of New Jersey, known as Symmes Purchase. With the Treaty of Greenville in 1795, lands west and north of the Miami, and south and east of the Greenville Treaty Line were ceded by Indians, and open to settlement.

== The survey ==
The survey commenced in 1798. Land was to be systematically surveyed into square "townships", six miles (9.656 km) on a side created by lines running north–south intersected by east–west lines. Townships were to be arranged in north–south rows called ranges. These townships were sub-divided into thirty-six "sections" of one square mile (2.59 km²) or 640 acres. These ranges, townships, and sections were to be systematically numbered. The First Principal Meridian was established to run northward from the confluence of the Great Miami River and the Ohio River. Ranges were numbered east and west from this meridian. Townships east of the meridian were numbered from south to north, starting at the Great Miami River. Townships west of the meridian were numbered from south to north starting at the Ohio River. Thus, townships in adjacent ranges rarely have the same number. Sections in each township are numbered according to the plan adopted in the Act of May 18, 1796. The Ohio Enabling Act of 1802 established the western boundary of the state along the First Principal Meridian.

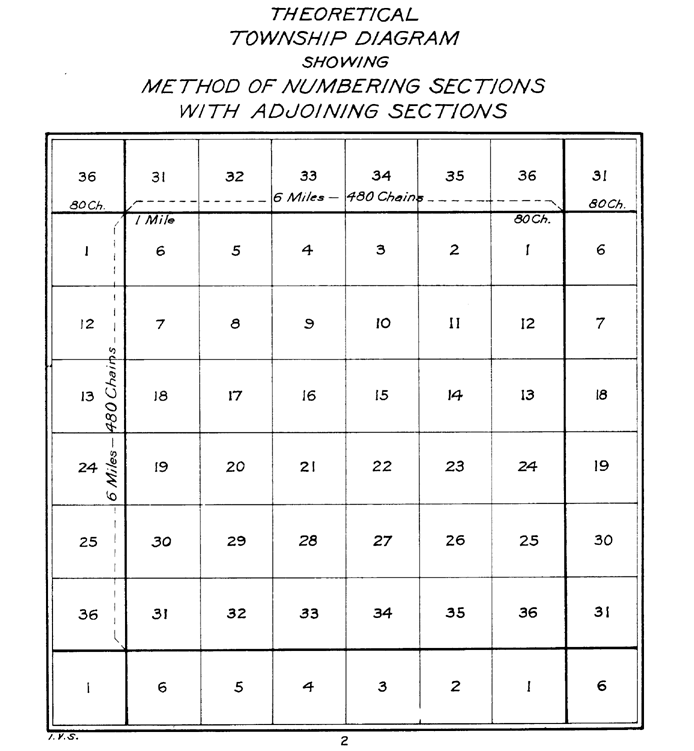
United States General Land Office plan for numbering sections of a standard survey township, adopted May 18, 1796

== Land sales ==
Section 4 of the Land Act of May 18, 1796 provided that the lands in the survey area be sold at Cincinnati. The Land Act of May 10, 1800 established a Federal Land Office at Cincinnati for sales of these lands. Sales were also conducted from the nation's capital at the United States General Land Office. Local offices were eventually closed. The State of Ohio also eventually sold lands granted to them by the federal government, such as section 16 of each township.

== College Township ==
Congress declared in September, 1803 that 23,321 acres (36.4 square miles) located in the Congress Lands West of Miami River were to be set aside for “an academy, other public schools and seminaries of learning.” It benefited Miami University, chartered in 1809 by the state legislature in a town the legislature named Oxford. The College Township is in township 5 of range 1 east, now the civil township called Oxford Township, Butler County, Ohio.

== Modern times ==
The survey in Ohio in modern times includes all or parts of nine counties: Butler, Darke, Hamilton, Logan, Mercer, Miami, Montgomery, Preble, and Shelby

== See also ==
- Ohio Lands
- Congress Lands
- Historic regions of the United States
