= Indian removals in Ohio =

Part of American history 1807-1843

Indian removals in Ohio started in the late eighteenth century after the American victory in the Revolutionary War and the consequent opening of the Northwestern United States to European-American settlement. Native American tribes residing in the region banded together to resist settlement, resulting in the disastrous Northwest Indian War where the Native tribes ceded large swathes of territory to the American government. After the American victory in the war, several Indian reservations were established to forcibly relocate landless tribes to. The process of obtaining full American sovereignty over Indian territories in Ohio was complete around 1818, but continued in Indiana until 1840.

== Background ==
=== The Indians of Ohio ===
Before the American Revolutionary War, the Ohio Territory was populated by tribes of Shawnee in the southwest, Miami in the far west, Wyandot in the northeast, the Senecas in the far northeast, and the Ottawas in the north.

=== Boundary lines ===
The Royal Proclamation of 1763 reserved what was then Ohio Country and lands beyond west of the Appalachians for Indians, and settlement by European colonists was forbidden. The Treaty of Fort Stanwix in 1768 defined the Ohio River as the boundary between Indian lands and the settler's lands west of the Appalachians. The Treaty of Fort McIntosh in 1785 circumscribed an area of central northern and northwestern Ohio Country as Indian land, essentially creating the first Indian reservation west of the Appalachians. The boundaries of that treaty followed natural landmarks and colonial forts, and became a blueprint for later treaties. Neither Indians nor settlers observed the boundaries of the treaty, resulting in the Northwest Indian War. The Treaty of Fort Harmar in 1789 which essentially reiterated the terms of earlier treaties, was a last attempt to placate the parties. Major United States army campaigns to assert sovereignty over the frontier ensued, culminating in the decisive American victory at Battle of Fallen Timbers in 1794.

== The beginning ==
The United States dictated terms of the peace following the War, circumscribing a boundary line around state territories of Connecticut Western Reserve and Virginia Military District, along with the Symmes and Ohio Company land purchases to include most of southern and eastern Ohio in an area reserved to settlers. The Treaty of Greenville 1795 superseded and nullified all older treaties that conflicted with the new one. The treaty acquired about 2/3 of the future state of Ohio, leaving only the northwestern portion of Ohio Country for the Indians. Northwestern Indian lands were subsequently reduced by the Treaty of Fort Industry 1805 which moved the eastern boundary of Indian lands west to coincide with the western boundary of the Firelands, part of the Connecticut Western Reserve in northeastern Ohio. The process continued with:

- Treaty of Detroit in 1807
- Treaty of Brownstown in 1808
- Treaty of Greenville in 1814
- Treaty of Fort Meigs in 1817

== Completion and continuance ==
In fall of 1818, six treaties were part of the Treaty of St. Mary's (1818), including Treaty with the Miami, that ceded the final piece of Ohio between the Greenville Treaty Line and St. Mary's River, completing the acquisition of Ohio for the United States. At the same time, the process of acquisition of lands and removal of Indians continued in Indiana with the other 5 treaties, acquiring nearly 1/3 of the land of Indiana thereby.

== Removals ==
Treaties after 1818 involved purchase or cession of reservations, and Indians were removed to out of state Indian Territory.

The last Indians in Ohio were removed in 1843 via Treaty with the Wyandots (1842) by which the reservation at Upper Sandusky was ceded to the United States, and the Wyandots relocated to Kansas in 1843.

As of the 20th century, there are no Indian reservations in Ohio, and no federally recognized Indian tribes in Ohio.

== See also ==
- Indian Removal Act
- Twelve Mile Square Reservation (not an Indian reservation)
- Upper Sandusky Reservation (Wyandot)
- Moravian Indian Grants (Gnadenhutten, Schoenbrun, and Salem)
- Treaty of Lewistown (1829)
