= Ohio Lands =

Divisions of land made during the European settlement of Ohio, United States

Map of the Ohio Lands

The Ohio Lands were the grants, tracts, districts, and cessions that made up what is now the U.S. state of Ohio. The Ohio Country was one of the first settled parts of the Midwest and, indeed, one of the first settled parts of the United States beyond the original Thirteen Colonies. The land that became first the anchor of the Northwest Territory and later Ohio was cobbled together from a variety of sources and owners.

List of Ohio Lands

- Canal Lands
  - Miami & Erie Canal Lands
  - Ohio & Erie Canal Lands
- College Township
- Congress Lands or Congressional Lands (1798–1821)
  - Congress Lands North of Old Seven Ranges
  - Congress Lands West of Miami River
  - Congress Lands East of Scioto River
  - North and East of the First Principal Meridian
  - South and East of the First Principal Meridian
- Connecticut Western Reserve
- Dohrman Tract
- Ephraim Kimberly Grant
- Firelands or Sufferers' Lands
- Fort Washington
- French Grant
- Indian Land Grants
- Maumee Road Lands
- Michigan Survey or Michigan Meridian Survey or Toledo Tract
- Ministerial Lands
- Moravian Indian Grants
  - Gnadenhutten Tract
  - Salem Tract
  - Schoenbrunn Tract
- Ohio Company of Associates
  - Purchase on the Muskingum
  - Donation Tract
  - College Lands
- Refugee Tract
- Salt Reservations or Salt Lands
- School Lands
- Seven Ranges or Old Seven Ranges
- Symmes Purchase or Miami Purchase and/or the Land Between the Miamis
- Toledo Strip, object of a nearly bloodless war between Ohio and Michigan
- Turnpike Lands
- Twelve-Mile Square Reservation
- Two-Mile Square Reservation
- United States Military District
- Virginia Military District
- Zane's Tracts or Zane's Grant or Ebenezer Zane Tract (see Zane's Trace)

== See also ==
- Indian removals in Ohio
- Historic regions of the United States
- Protected areas of Ohio
