= Two Mile Square Reservation =

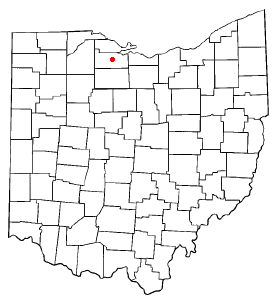
location of Two Mile Square Reservation in Ohio

The Two Mile Square Reservation or Two Mile Square Reserve was a tract of land in Ohio ceded by Native Americans to the United States of America in the Treaty of Greenville in 1795. It was subsequently surveyed in a manner different from surrounding land, and lots sold to settlers.

== History ==
The Americans won the Battle of Fallen Timbers in 1794, ending the Northwest Indian War. As a result of the battle, the Treaty of Greenville was signed, which ceded much of southern and eastern Ohio to America. In addition, Article 3 ceded a number of other tracts, including #11: "One piece two miles square, at the lower rapids of the Sandusky river." The lower rapids is today in Fremont, Ohio, and the reservation is on land that would have otherwise been part of townships four and five north, range fifteen east of the Congress Lands North and East of First Principal Meridian.41°20′33″N 83°06′40″W

During the War of 1812, Fort Stephenson was built within the reservation, and successfully defended by George Croghan against attack by British and Indian troops under General Proctor.

== Survey and sales ==
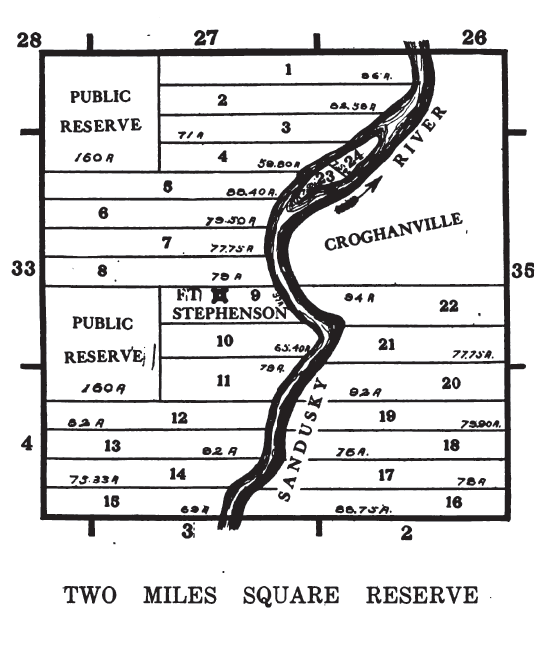
The Two Mile Square Reservation was surveyed and divided as shown

Congress arranged for a special indiscriminate location survey for the reserve. Under the Act of 1805, William Ewing subdivided it into four sections of a mile square in 1807, with neither township nor range. These were numbered one to four, with one in the northeast corner, and counting anti-clockwise. By Act of April 27, 1816, Joseph Wampler resurveyed the exterior lines, laid out 310 in-lots and 63 out-lots in the portion of section one east of the river for the town of Croghanville, set off two "Public Reserves" of one quarter section each, divided a river island in section one in two, and divided the remainder of the reserve into 22 "Fractional Sections" fronting the river of about 80 acres (320,000 m^{2}) each. The reserve was assigned to the Canton Land District, with sales at the office in Wooster, for minimum prices assigned by the 1816 act. In 1829, the town was incorporated as Lower Sandusky, and the name was changed to Fremont in 1848.

== See also ==
- Ohio Lands
- Historic regions of the United States
- Fremont, Ohio
