= Treaty of St. Mary's (1818) =

1818 treaties between the United States and Native Americans

- Signed: September–October, 1818
- Location: St. Marys, Ohio
- Parties: United States; Miami; Delaware; Potawatomi; Wyandot; Wea
- Language: English

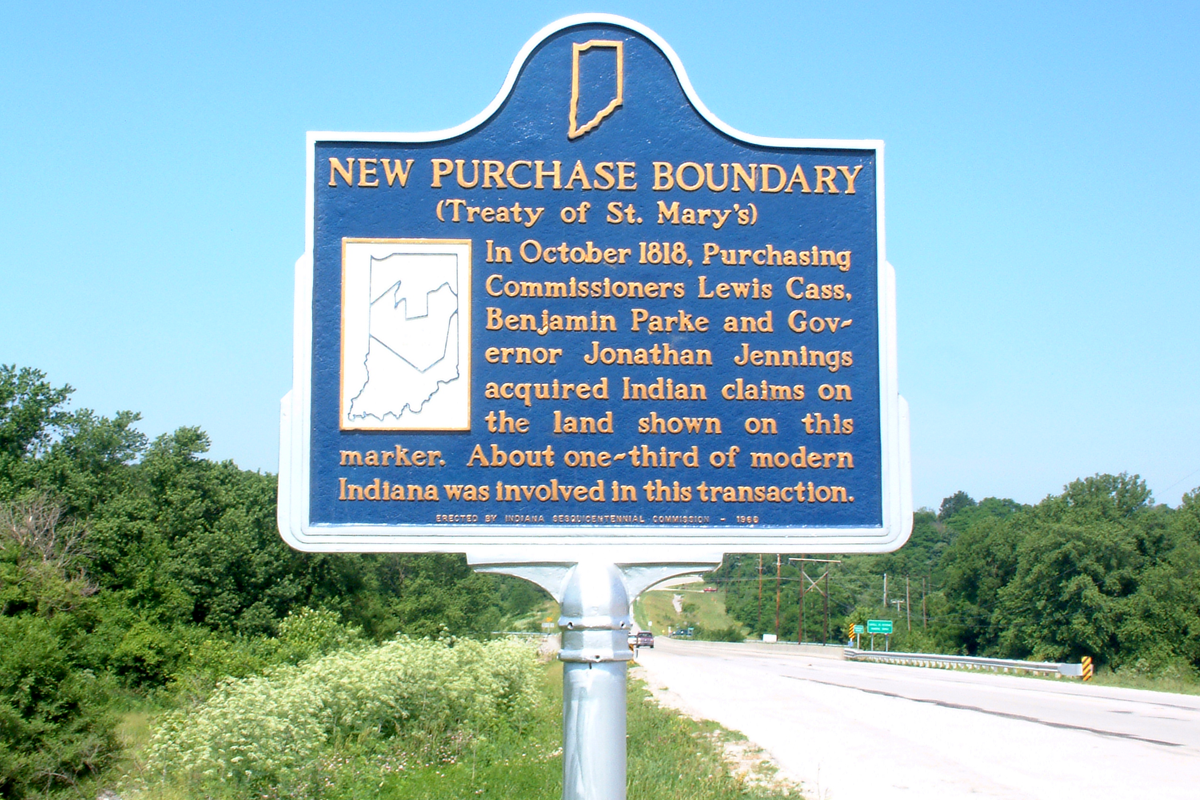
A marker on the border of the New Purchase near Delphi, Indiana

The Treaty of St. Mary's may refer to one of six treaties concluded in fall of 1818 between the United States and Natives of central Indiana regarding purchase of Native land. The treaties were

- Treaty with the Wyandot, etc.
- Treaty with the Wyandot
- Treaty with the Potawatomi
- Treaty with the Wea
- Treaty with the Delaware
- Treaty with the Miami

The main treaty was with the Miamis, who were the main tribe in Indiana. Unqualified references to the treaty usually refer to this one. The treaties acquired a substantial portion of the land area (dubbed the New Purchase) of the state of Indiana from the Miami, Delaware, Potawatomi, and others in exchange for cash, salt, sawmills, and other goods, effectively moving the northern boundary of the state from near the Ohio River to the Wabash River in the northwest and north. They also resulted in creation of Indian reservations and continued the process of Indian removals in Indiana begun by the Treaty of Greenville in 1795.

== The treaties ==
In the fall of 1818 six separate treaties were completed at St. Marys, Ohio, between the United States and the Wyandot, Seneca, Shawnese, and Ottawas (September 17), with the Wyandot (September 20), the Potawatomi (October 2), the Wea (October 2), the Delaware (October 3), and the Miami (October 6).

The treaty with the Wyandot, Seneca, Shawnese, and Ottawas of September 17, 1818, established that the grants described in the Treaty of Fort Meigs (formally titled, "Treaty with the Wyandots, etc., 1817") would be considered only as reservations for the use of indigenous peoples. The 1818 treaty also granted additional land reservations and annuity payments to the involved indigenous groups.

The treaty with the Wyandot of September 20, resulted in the cession by the Natives of two small tracts of land in Wayne County, Michigan Territory, containing the villages of Maguaga and Brownstown in present-day Riverview and Flat Rock, Michigan. In return, Territorial Governor Lewis Cass granted them land in Huron Charter Township, Michigan.

The treaty with the Wea of October 2 resulted in the Wea ceding their claims to all lands in Ohio, Indiana, and Illinois. In return, the U.S. government agreed to pay a sum total of $3,000 in silver annually to the Wea on a reservation the tribe had claimed earlier in the treaty. This reserved tract of land was described as "Beginning at the mouth of Raccoon creek; thence by the present boundary line, seven miles; thence, northeasterly, seven miles, to a point seven miles from the Wabash river; thence to the Wabash river, by a line parallel to the present boundary line aforesaid; and thence, by the Wabash river, to the place of beginning."

The treaty with the Potawatomi of October 2 established cessions of land to the United States. The U.S. government also agreed to pay perpetual annuity to the Potawatomi, as well as to purchase any claim to the ceded land made by the Kickapoo. William Conner served as an interpreter.

The treaty with the Delawares (Lenape) of October 3 established the cession of all Lenape land in Indiana to the United States. In return, the U.S. government was to provide a country for the displaced Lenape people west of the Mississippi River; full compensation for their improvements; perpetual annuity; grants of land to individuals; and the payment of certain claims. The U.S. government also agreed to provide and support a blacksmith for the Lenape after their removal to the west, and the Lenape were allowed to occupy their ceded territory for up to three years after the signing of the treaty. Signatories included, among others, Kikthawenund of the Unalatchgo Lenape clan and federal commissioner Jonathan Jennings. William Conner served as an interpreter.

The treaty with the Miami was signed on October 6, 1818, at St. Mary's, Ohio, between representatives of the United States and the Miami tribe, as well as others living in their territory. Jonathan Jennings, Lewis Cass, and Benjamin Parke, acting as representatives of the United States, signed the treaty. William Conner served as an interpreter. The accord contained seven articles. Based on the terms of the accord, the Miami ceded territories south of the Wabash River covering a large portion of central Indiana, subsequently known as the "New Purchase", to the United States. This tract consisted of the entire central portion of Indiana between the Wabash River and the old boundary established by the Treaty of Fort Wayne (1809). It also established the first Indian reservation in Indiana, the Great Miami Reserve in the northern portion of the New Purchase. In another tenet of the accord, the United States agreed to pay the Miami a perpetual annuity of fifteen thousand dollars. Moreover, the United States agreed to construct one gristmill and one sawmill, as well as provide one blacksmith, one gunsmith, and agricultural implements. The Miami would also be provided one hundred and sixty bushels of salt annually.

=== New Purchase tract ===
Extent of the treaty lands

The New Purchase was a jagged shaped area comprising most of the central third of the state. It had a large trapezoid "bite" out of the northern boundary that became the Great Miami Reserve, and a sawtooth in the northwest where the Tippecanoe and Wabash Rivers formed a gore. The treaties defined the northern and western boundary as the Wabash, Tippecanoe, and Vermillion rivers; the southwestern and southeastern boundaries were the treaty lines from the Treaty of Fort Wayne of 1809; the far southeastern and northeastern boundaries were treaty lines from the Treaty of Grouseland of 1805, and parts of the eastern and western boundaries were the borders of the state. The southern tip of the area extended to what is today central Jackson County near Brownstown.

=== Big Miami Reserve ===
By the treaty with the Miami, the Miami ceded most of their land south of the Wabash River, except for some individual plots and a parcel in north central Indiana between the Eel River and the Salamonie River called the Big Miami Reserve. The Reserve contained about 760,000 acres (3,100 km^{2}) and was the largest Indian reservation ever to exist within the state of Indiana. It encompassed all of present-day Howard County, and portions of seven surrounding counties: Wabash, Miami, Cass, Clinton, Tipton, Madison, and Grant. At its creation, the area was wilderness, and there were no colonial settlements between Terre Haute and Fort Wayne on the Wabash River.

The reservation was short-lived. By 1840, via several additional treaties, the state effectively acquired the reservation and removed the Indians to west of the Mississippi River.

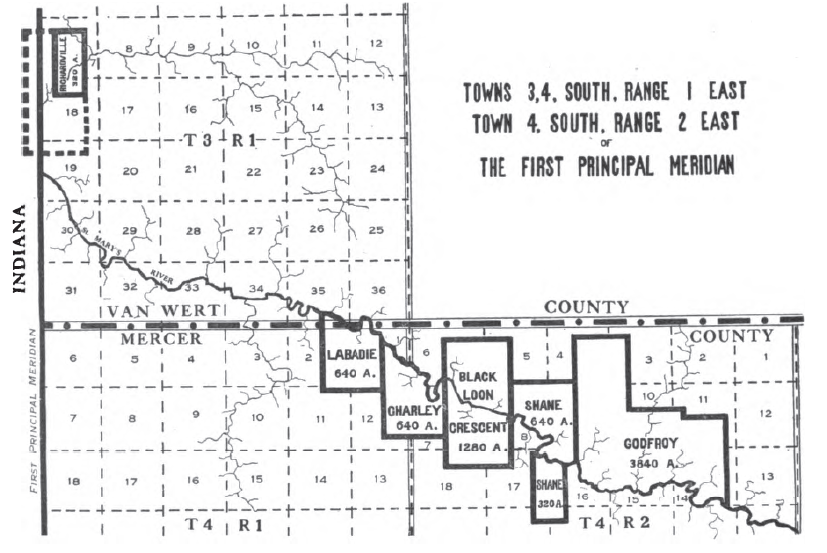
Land grants in Ohio enumerated in Article 3 of this treaty

== Aftermath ==
The treaties resulted in the confinement of the Miami to the reserve area and the removal of the Delaware, who dominated central and east central Indiana, to west of the Mississippi River by 1820, clearing the way for colonization by settlers migrating north and west from Cincinnati and other Ohio River settlements.

The area was called the Delaware New Purchase until it was divided into Wabash County in the northwest and Delaware County in the southeast on January 2, 1820. Those counties were soon after dissolved, and the areas came to be called the "Wabash New Purchase" and "Delaware New Purchase" (renamed the "Adams New Purchase" in 1827). Subsequently, 35 new counties were carved out of the original area. The future state capital of Indianapolis was founded in 1822, roughly in the center of the New Purchase area.

== See also ==
- Treaty of Fort Meigs, the immediate precursor
- List of Indian treaties
- Indian Removals in Ohio
- Indian removals in Indiana
