= South and East of the First Principal Meridian =

Coordinates: 40°54′N 84°0′W

South and East of the First Principal Meridian is a land description in the American Midwest.

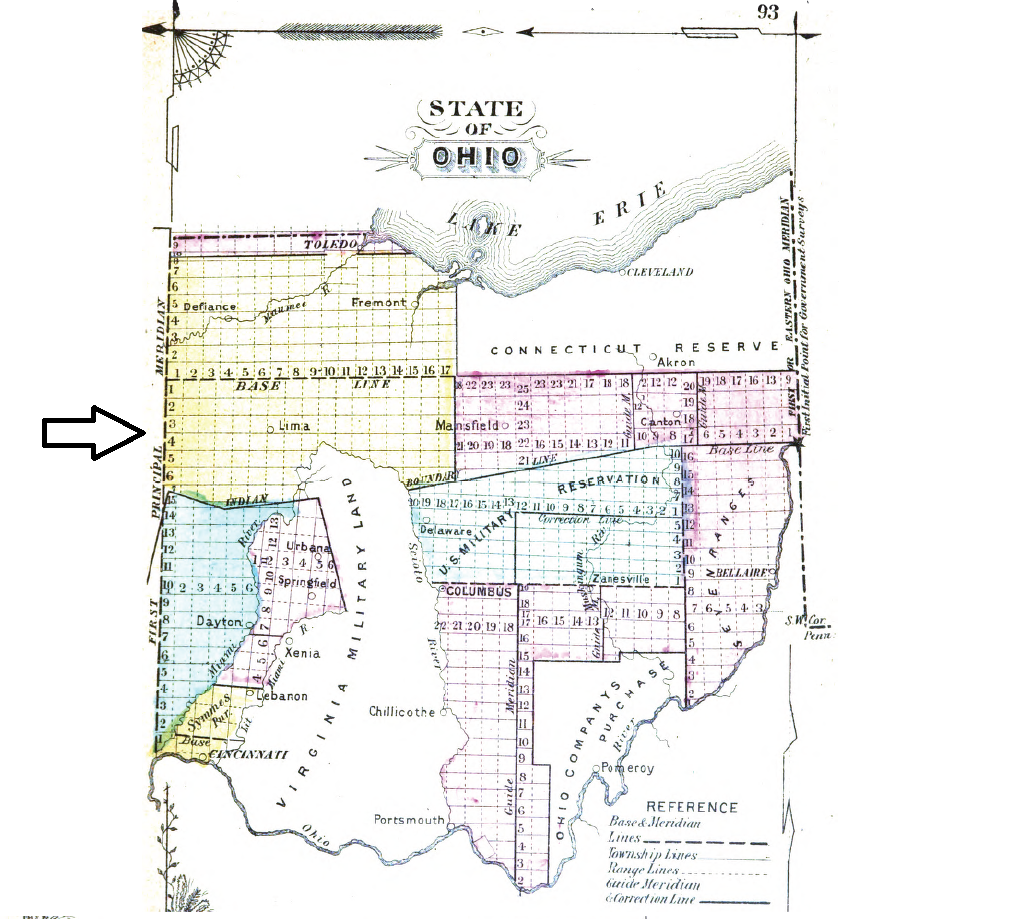
Arrow points to tract

In 1812, Congress authorized the Surveyor General to survey the northern and western border of Ohio “as soon as the consent of the Indians can be obtained.“ In 1817, the northern portion of the Ohio-Indiana border was surveyed and became known as the First Principal Meridian for lands surveyed in the northwest part of Ohio. The 41st parallel north latitude became the base line. Congress Lands lying east of the meridian and south of the base line were first surveyed in 1819 under the direction of Edward Tiffin, Surveyor General of the United States. The tract included Indian reservations surveyed after the tribes left. This survey used the standard six-mile-square township, but townships were numbered north to south. Surveyed ranges were numbered west to east. Before this, land had been surveyed using several inconsistent and less satisfactory systems

Allen, Auglaize, Crawford, Hancock, Van Wert, and Wyandot counties as well as portions of Hardin, Logan, Marion, Mercer, Morrow, and Putnam counties are included in the survey.

== Land Sales ==
The Act of March 3, 1819 established the Piqua Land District, with a Land Office in that town for sale of lands in this survey within 48 miles of the state of Indiana. For lands in this survey more than 48 miles from Indiana, a land office and land district were established at Delaware. The Piqua office was moved to ”Wapaughkoneta“, then, on March 3, 1835, to Lima, and finally, on March 3, 1843, to a consolidated land district at Upper Sandusky. Sales were also conducted from the nation’s capital at the United States General Land Office. Local offices were eventually closed. The State of Ohio also eventually sold lands granted to them by the federal government, such as section 16 of each township, and the Turnpike Lands.

== See also ==
- Ohio Lands
- North and East of the First Principal Meridian
- Historic regions of the United States
