= Twelve Mile Square Reservation =

Area of Ohio, United States

The Twelve Mile Square Reservation is the green square in the northwest corner of Ohio (upper-left)

The Twelve Mile Square Reservation, also called the Twelve Mile Square Reserve, was a tract of land in Ohio ceded by Indians to the United States of America in the Treaty of Greenville in 1795. This particular area of land immediately surrounding Fort Miami was considered to be of strategic importance by the United States government representatives. It was subsequently surveyed in a manner different from surrounding land, and lots sold, or granted, to settlers.

== History ==
In 1680, Frontenac, the French Governor of Canada, established Fort Miami on the west bank of the Maumee River. It was the first fortification in Ohio built by non-indigenous people. The fort was used as a trading post for a short time, then abandoned. During the Northwest Indian War the British rebuilt Fort Miami to assist the Indians fighting the Americans. The Americans won the Battle of Fallen Timbers nearby in 1794. As a result of the battle, the Treaty of Greenville was signed, which ceded much of southern and eastern Ohio to the United States. In addition, Article 3 ceded a number of other tracts, including #8: "One piece twelve miles square, at the British fort on the Miami of the Lake, at the foot of the rapids." At that time, the Maumee river was called the Miami of the lake, and the foot of the rapids are today between the towns Maumee and Perrysburg. Jay's Treaty led to the fort being abandoned in 1796.

== Survey and settlement ==
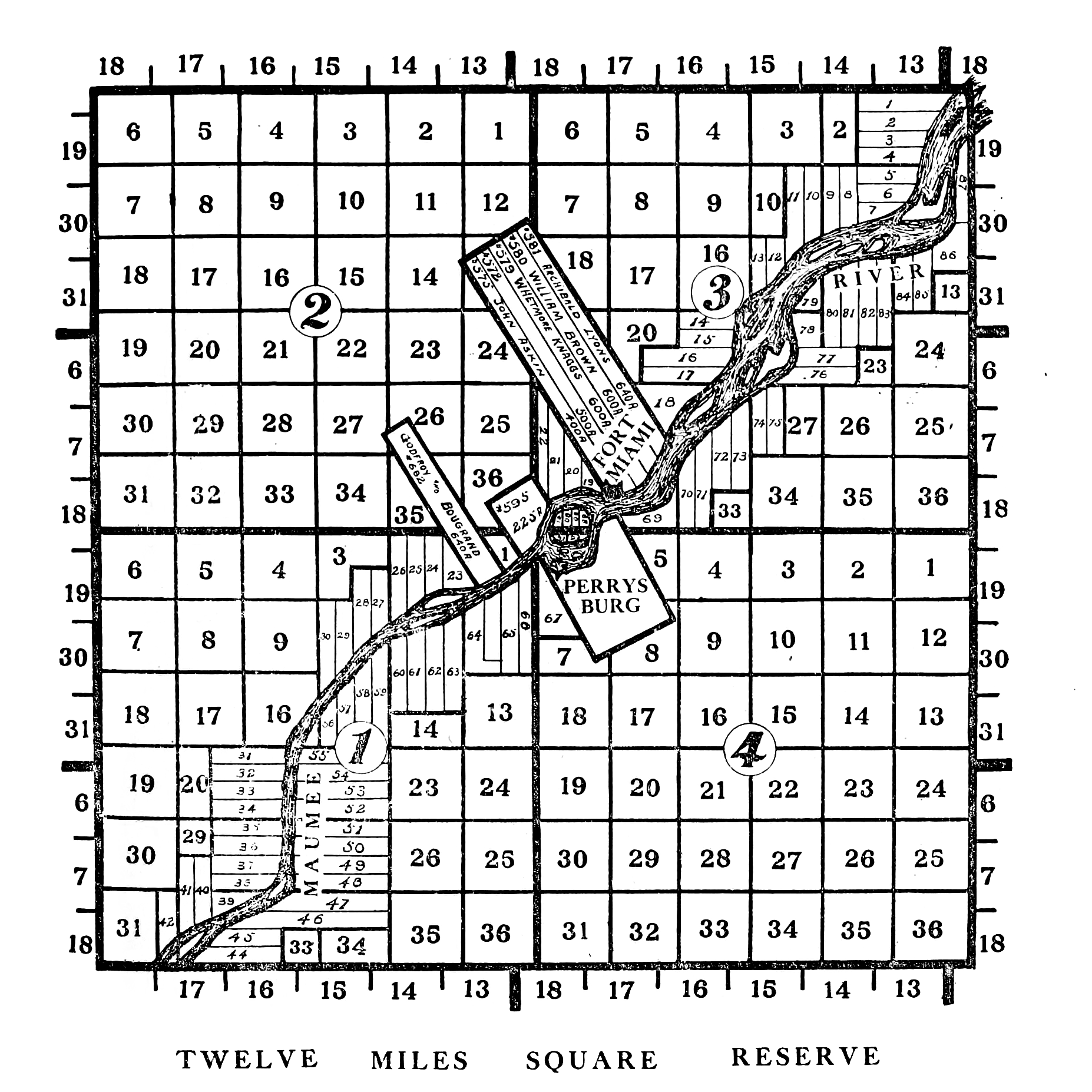
The Twelve Mile Square Reservation was surveyed and divided as shown

While the French and British occupied the region, many white people settled near the fort. The United States wished to give legal title to these people, and sell the rest of the tract. To accomplish this, on March 3, 1805, Congress arranged for a special indiscriminate location survey for the reserve. Deputy surveyor Elias Glover subdivided the tract into four townships of six miles (10 km) square each in 1805, with the southwest township being number one, the northwest number two, the northeast number three, and the southeast number four. The tract has no ranges, and is an original survey, unrelated to later 1821 Congress Lands surveys that surround the reserve, known as North and East of First Principal Meridian.

In 1807, Congress directed that every person in the actual possession of any tract of land, in his own right, and settled, occupied and improved by him prior to the first day of July, 1796, or by some other person under whom he claimed the right to its occupancy or possession, should be confirmed in his title as an estate of inheritance in fee simple, and be entitled to a land patent for it.

Each township was subdivided into 36 1-square-mile (2.6 km^{2}) sections numbered boustrophedonically, as established by the Act of May 18, 1796. Under the Act of 1816, Joseph Wampler surveyed the riverfront into long lots of about 160 acres (0.65 km^{2}) each, numbered 1 to 93, and officially called "River Tracts". The private claims of the British and French era settlers were surveyed in 1817 by deputy surveyor S. Carpenter. The partial sections left after the River Tracts were called "Fractional Sections". The Act of 1816 set aside section 16 of each township as School Lands for benefit of schools in each township. These sections were eventually sold. Town lots in Perrysburg were also laid out in 1816, providing less than two sections of land in lots less than 1/4 acre (0.10 ha) each. Land sales were through the Wooster Land Office in the Canton Land District.

== Modern times ==
The tract encompasses portions of Wood and Lucas counties, including Perrysburg, Maumee, Rossford, and south suburban Toledo, Ohio. The corners of the Reservation are at 41°39′13″N 83°45′44″W (NW of the intersection of Dorr and Crissey roads, forming part of the boundary with Spencer and Springfield townships), 41°39′10″N 83°31′33″W (NE of the MLK Bridge within the Maumee River), 41°28′41″N 83°31′45″W (the intersection of Tracy and Dowling roads, forming the SE corner of Perrysburg Township), 41°28′39″N 83°45′43″W (NE of the intersection of Neowash and Noward roads in Waterville Township).

== See also ==
- Ohio Lands
- Historic regions of the United States
