= Treaty of Brownstown =

1808 treaty between the United States and Native Americans

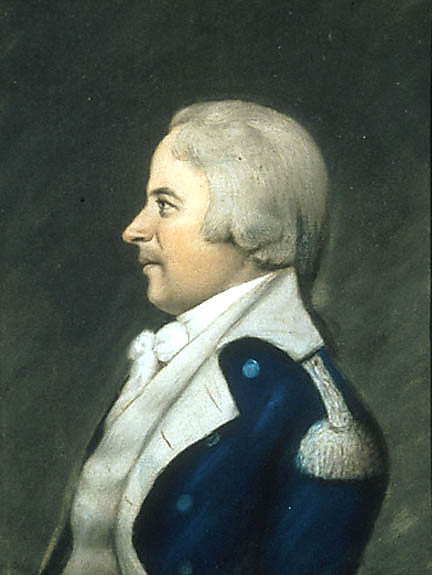
William Hull

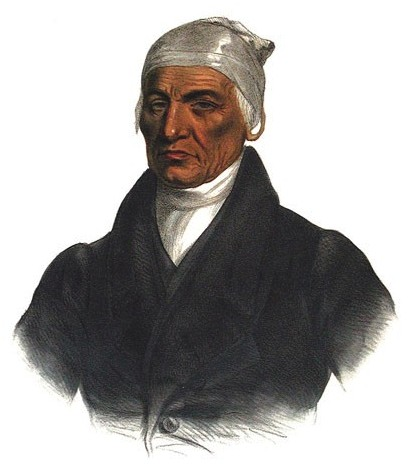
Black Hoof

The Treaty of Brownstown was between the United States and the Council of Three Fires (Chippewa, Ottawa, Potawatomi), Wyandott, and Shawanoese Indian Nations. It was concluded November 25, 1808, at Brownstown in Michigan Territory, and provided cession of a strip of Indian land for a road to connect two disconnected areas of land previously ceded by Indians in Michigan and Ohio.

== Background ==
With the Treaty of Greenville in 1795 the Indian Nations ceded southern and eastern Ohio to white settlement. The Treaty of Fort Industry in 1805 moved the boundary westward to a line 120 miles (190 km) west of Pennsylvania, which coincided with the western boundary of the Firelands of the Connecticut Western Reserve. In 1807, the Treaty of Detroit called for the cession of lands northwest of the Maumee River, mostly in the Territory of Michigan. The area between the Maumee River and the 1805 boundary remained Indian Lands, and thus, the United States could not legally build a road connecting settlements in Ohio and the Territory of Michigan. This area was also swampy, and would require much engineering effort and funds to cross with a road.

== Treaty ==
The treaty contained 5 articles. Among them were a provision that ceded to the United States a narrow strip of land in northwestern Ohio comprising "a tract of land for a road, of one hundred and twenty feet in width, from the foot of the rapids of the river Miami of Lake Erie (today known as the Maumee River, to the western line of the Connecticut reserve, and all the land within one mile of the said road...".

== See also ==
- Maumee Road Lands
- Indian Removals in Ohio
- List of Indian treaties
