= Benjamin Stites =

Benjamin Stites (1749–1804) was an American pioneer and one of the earliest Anglo-American settlers in the Miami River region of the Northwest Territory. He is best known for leading the first group of settlers to the Symmes Purchase and for founding Columbia, one of the earliest settlements in present-day Cincinnati, Ohio.

== Early life ==
Stites was born in New Jersey in 1749. Before migrating west, he worked as a trader along the Ohio River and became familiar with the region’s geography and settlement potential.

== Ohio settlement ==
In 1787–1788, Stites provided information to Judge John Cleves Symmes that influenced the federal land grant later known as the Symmes Purchase. He organized and led the first boatload of settlers to the purchase, establishing Columbia in late 1788.

Stites served in local militia defense during the Northwest Indian War and participated in additional settlement efforts in what became Warren County.

== Death and legacy ==
Stites died in 1804. He is buried in the Pioneer Memorial Cemetery in Cincinnati, where an 1879 monument commemorates the Columbia settlers known as “The First Boat-Load.”
