= Treaty of Wapakoneta =

1831 land cession by the Shawnee tribe to the US in present-day Ohio

The Treaty of Wapakoneta was signed on August 8, 1831. Remnants of the Shawnee Native American tribe in Wapakoneta were forced to relinquish claims that they had to land in western Ohio.

In exchange, the United States government agreed to provide the tribe with 100,000 acres (400 km^{2}) of land west of the Mississippi River. The United States officials agreed to provide supplies and monetary payment and to construct a sawmill and a gristmill for the Shawnees on their newly allocated land. This agreement became known as the Treaty of Wapakoneta or the Treaty with the Shawnee.

The treaty, along with several other agreements between indigenous tribes and the United States government, marked the slow but gradual removal of native people to land west of the Mississippi River, a policy known as Indian removal.
