= Symmes Purchase =

Tract of land in Ohio

Coordinates: 39°15′N 84°30′W

Map of Ohio showing the Symmes Purchase.

The Symmes Purchase, also known as the Miami Purchase, was an area of land totaling roughly 311,682 acres (487.003 sq mi; 1,261.33 km^{2}) in what is now Hamilton, Butler, and Warren counties of southwestern Ohio, purchased by Judge John Cleves Symmes of New Jersey in 1788 from the Continental Congress.

== History ==
In the 1780s, Benjamin Stites, a friend of Symmes, was visiting Limestone (now Maysville, Kentucky) and lost some of his horses to theft by Native Americans. Pursuing them through the wilderness of southwestern Ohio, he travelled as far north as Xenia, observing the fertility of the country in the process. He was so impressed with the region that he informed Symmes of its prospects upon his return. Symmes gathered a syndicate, known as the Miami Company, to buy the land. The original contract was for 1,000,000 acres (4,000 km^{2}), but the company couldn't afford to pay for the land, and paid for and received only 311,686 acres (1,261.35 km^{2}) in the southwest portion of the original tract. The land was 66 2/3¢ per acre.

== Location ==
The tract is bordered on the south by the Ohio River, on the west by the Great Miami River, and on the east by the Little Miami River. The northern boundary runs through Butler and Warren Counties about 25 miles north of the Ohio River. Sections of Todhunter and Garver Roads in Monroe, Monroe Road in Lebanon, and Oregonia Road in Turtlecreek Township run along the boundary.

== Survey ==
Deeds in this area will refer to the "Between the Miami Rivers Survey", "M.Rs." or "M.R.S." (M.R.S. is also used to describe the "Miami River Survey" a survey west of the Great Miami River).

Unfortunately, Symmes' men committed many errors while performing the survey, including using magnetic north rather than correcting for true north. Further, Symmes sold much land that he did not own, some as far north as Dayton, meaning that some early settlers found themselves squatters on the public domain. Symmes also sold some land that he did own more than once.

== Settlement ==
Three settlements grew up in the area in 1788, all near the Ohio River: Losantiville, North Bend, and Columbia. Losantiville was renamed Cincinnati in 1789 by Arthur St. Clair, governor of the Northwest Territory. They were among the earliest settlements in Ohio and the Northwest Territory. In 1789, Fort Washington was built in the reserved portion of the Purchase to protect the fledgling settlements.

== See also ==
- Ohio Company Purchase
- Ohio lands
- Land Ordinance of 1785
