= Congress Lands =

Coordinates: 40°21′29″N 80°36′51″W

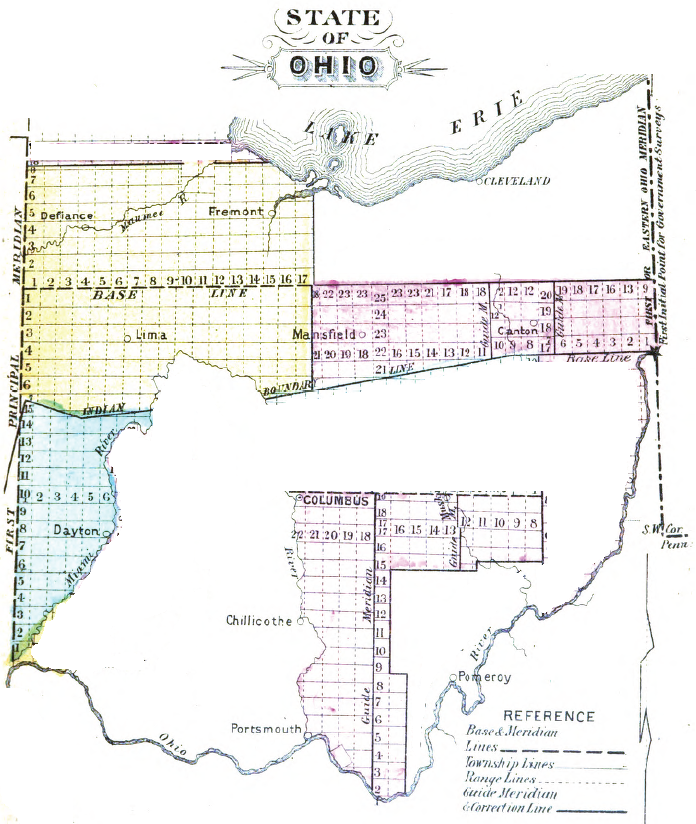
Congress Lands in Ohio

The Congress Lands was a group of land tracts in Ohio that made land available for sale to members of the general public through land offices in various cities, and through the United States General Land Office. It consisted of three groups of surveys:

- Ohio River Base
  - Congress Lands East of Scioto River
  - Congress Lands North of Old Seven Ranges
- Congress Lands West of Miami River
- Northwest Ohio
  - North and East of the First Principal Meridian
  - South and East of the First Principal Meridian

== Ohio River Base ==
The Ohio River Base consisted of the Congress Lands East of Scioto River, and Congress Lands North of Old Seven Ranges. These surveys had vertical rows of six mile square townships called Ranges. These ranges were numbered from Ellicott's Line, the boundary between Ohio and Pennsylvania, also known as the Eastern Ohio Meridian. The townships within each range were surveyed north and south from the baseline called the “Geographer’s Line” at 40 degrees 38 minutes north, which runs west from the north bank of the Ohio River where it exits Pennsylvania, at a place now called the Beginning Point of the U.S. Public Land Survey. The townships were not numbered from the baseline, but from south to north beginning with the first partial township in each range formed next to the Ohio River. Thus, townships in adjacent ranges rarely had the same number. This system extended the original numbering plan from the Seven Ranges. There being no east ranges or south townships, plats are designated “Township X of Range Y of Ohio River Survey” with no need for north or west designations. Surveys on the Ohio River Base also consist of the Ohio Company and the Seven Ranges. The Seven Ranges were sold in the same manner, and could be considered Congress Lands, but get a special category to itself.

== Congress Lands West of Miami River ==
The Congress Lands West of Miami River consists of lands between the Great Miami River and Indiana, and south of the Greenville Treaty Line. Ranges are designated as east of the First Principal Meridian which is at the Ohio-Indiana border. Townships are numbered from south to north, with irregularities caused by the course of the Great Miami River.

== Northwest Ohio ==
Congress Lands in northwest Ohio consist of North and East of the First Principal Meridian and South and East of the First Principal Meridian. These lands are south of a narrow strip next to the Michigan border, west of the Firelands and the Congress Lands North of Old Seven Ranges, North of the Greenville Treaty Line and the Virginia Military District, and east of Indiana. Townships are surveyed north and south from the baseline at 41 degrees north, and are designated “Township X N, Range Y E of First Principal Meridian” or “Township X S, Range Y E of First Principal Meridian”.

== Township Subdivision ==
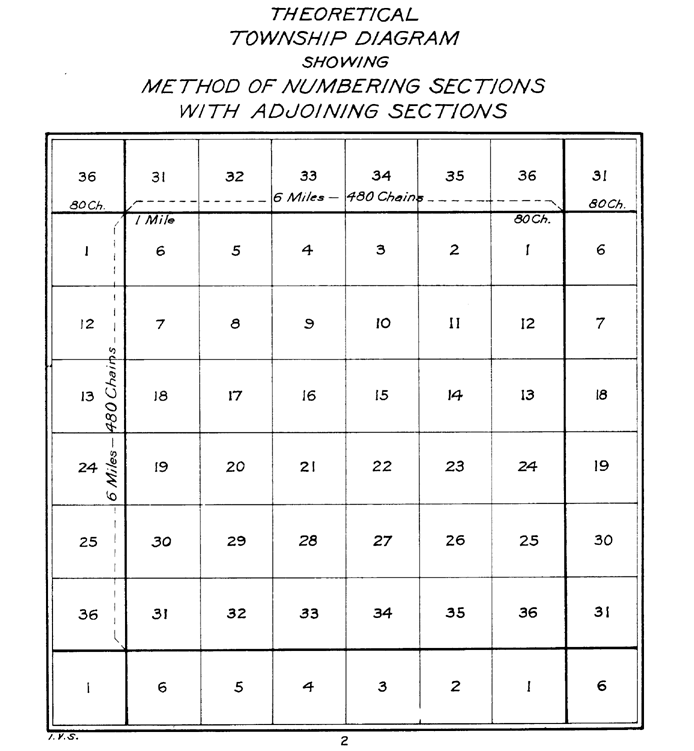
United States General Land Office plan for numbering sections of a standard survey township, adopted May 18, 1796

In all five of Ohio's Congress Lands, townships are divided into 36 one mile square sections. These sections are numbered by the method established May 18, 1796. Section sixteen of each survey township was set aside for support of public schools.

== Other Lands ==
Lands that were not dispersed in the United States Military District or the Refugee Tract were made available for sale through the various Land Offices, and treated the same as Congress Lands.

== See also ==
- Ohio Lands
- Historic regions of the United States
