= First principal meridian =

US Survey line

Coordinates: 40°59′21.74″N 84°48′11.69″W

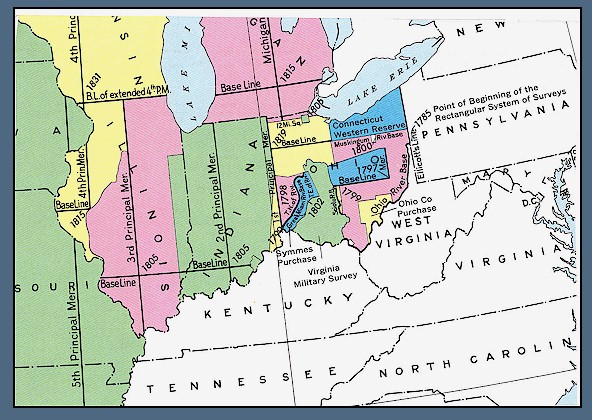
U.S. Bureau of Land Management map showing the first four principal meridians

The first principal meridian is a meridian that began at the junction of the Ohio River and Great Miami River. It extends north on the boundary line between the states of Ohio and Indiana, and roughly approximates to the meridian of longitude 84° 48′ 50″ west from Greenwich. The ranges of the public surveys in the state of Ohio, west of the Scioto River, are (in part) numbered from this meridian.

== See also ==
- List of principal and guide meridians and base lines of the United States
