= Treaty of Fort Industry =

1805 treaty between the United States and Native Americans

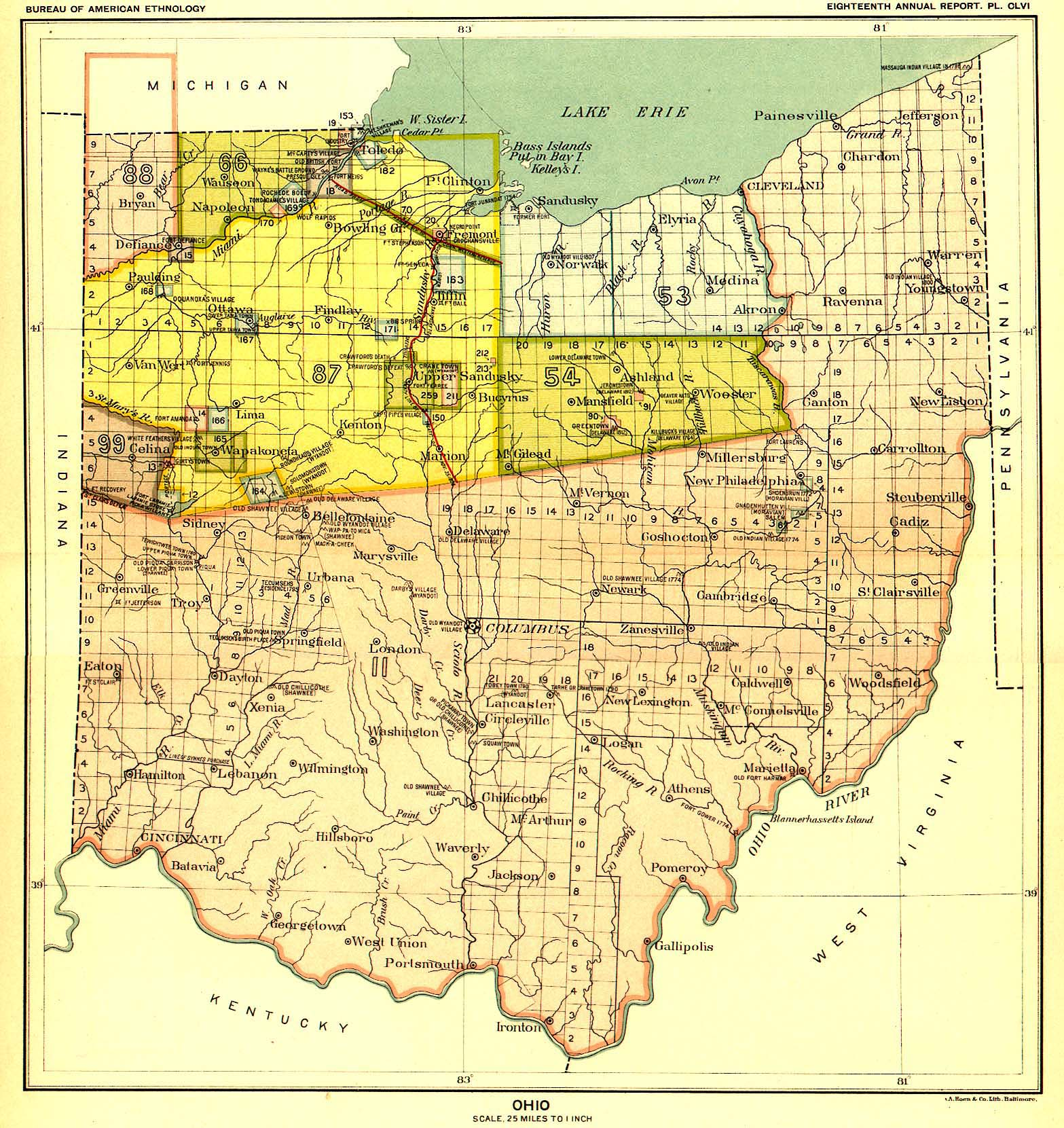
The area on the east and south labeled 11 was ceded by the Treaty of Greenville in 1795. The two areas on top labeled 53 and 54 were ceded in 1805 with the Treaty of Fort Industry

The Treaty of Fort Industry was a successor treaty to the Treaty of Greenville, which moved the eastern boundary of Indian lands in northern Ohio from the Tuscarawas River and Cuyahoga River westward to a line 120 miles west of the Pennsylvania boundary, which coincided with the western boundary of the Firelands of the Connecticut Western Reserve. In return, the United States agreed "every year forever hereafter, at Detroit, or some other convenient place" to pay $825 for the ceded lands south of the 41st degree of north latitude, and an additional $175 for the Firelands, which lie north of 41 degrees north, which the President would secure from the Connecticut Land Company, for a total of annuity $1000.00, to be "divided between said nations, from time to time, in such proportions as said nations, with the approbation of the President, shall agree."

The treaty was signed on July 4, 1805 by Charles Jouett, a federal Indian agent, for the United States, and representatives of the Ottawa, Potawatomi, Chippewa, Wyandot, Munsee, Delaware and Shawnee.

== Background ==
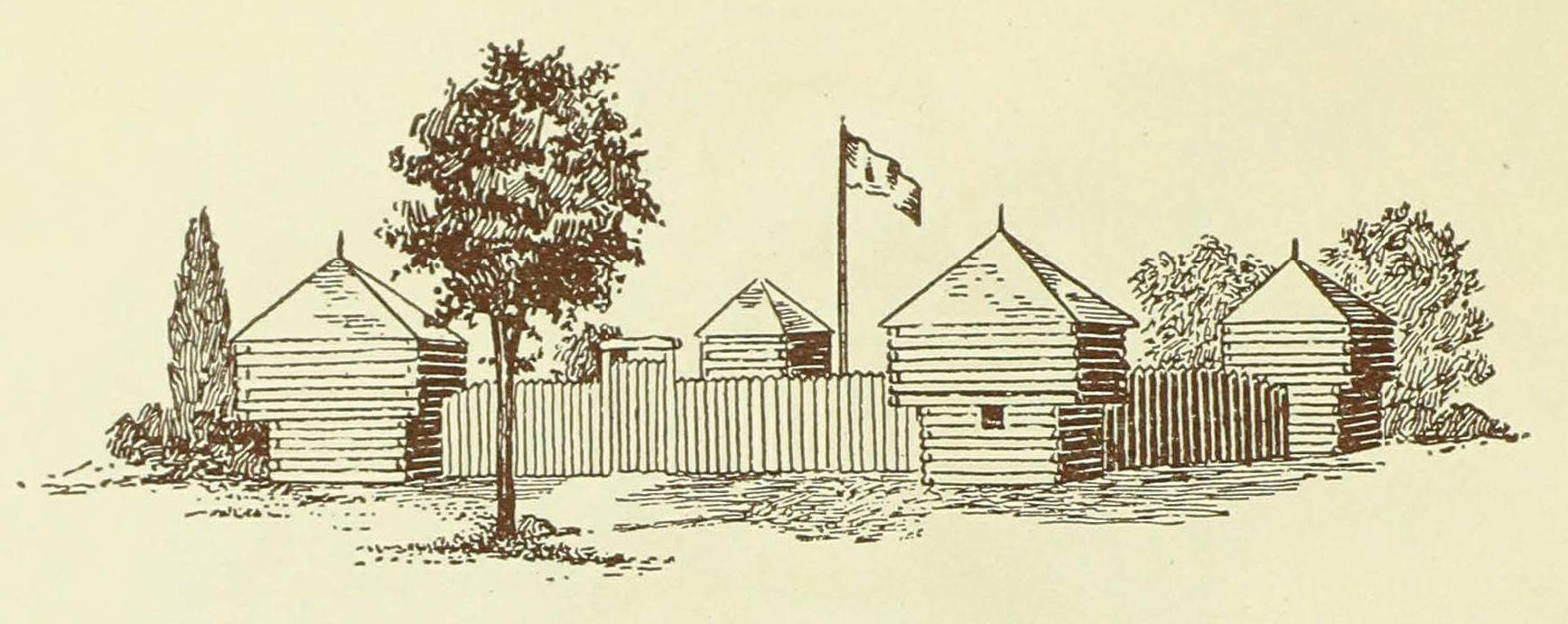
An artist's illustration of Fort Industry from the 1920 book "Tell the World About Toledo!"

The Connecticut Western Reserve was established by Connecticut's cession of its Ohio and Illinois Country land claims in 1785. The later designated Firelands and the western portion of the Connecticut Land Company's purchase of the Reserve extended west of the Treaty line established by the Treaty of Fort McIntosh that same year. Conflicts over the area, which was in Indian Country, erupted almost immediately after the treaty signing. While the Treaty of Greenville generally brought peace to the Ohio Country frontier, the Western Reserve boundary line problem was not resolved until the Firelands portion was acquired by the Treaty of Fort Industry.

== Aftermath ==
The location of Fort Industry is one of the enduring mysteries of the western frontier. The place of the signing was on the upper Maumee River though the exact location is lost to history. It was possibly a temporary stockade or fortification erected just for the signing. Local tradition places the fort at the mouth of the Swan River on the Maumee in Toledo, Ohio, although there is no documented record of this. U.S. government and military records do not mention that any fort or post was ever built there or anywhere with that name. The name does not appear in period letters and documents before or after that time. The name is often associated with Gen. Anthony Wayne as one of the forts he built along the western Ohio border in the Northwest Indian War more than a decade before. However, Gen. Wayne had been dead for nine years at the time of the signing.

== See also ==
- List of Native American treaties
- Indian Removals in Ohio
