= Treaty of Greenville =

1795 treaty ending the Northwest Indian War

Coordinates: 40.1078°N 84.6316°W

Treaty with the Wyandots, etc.
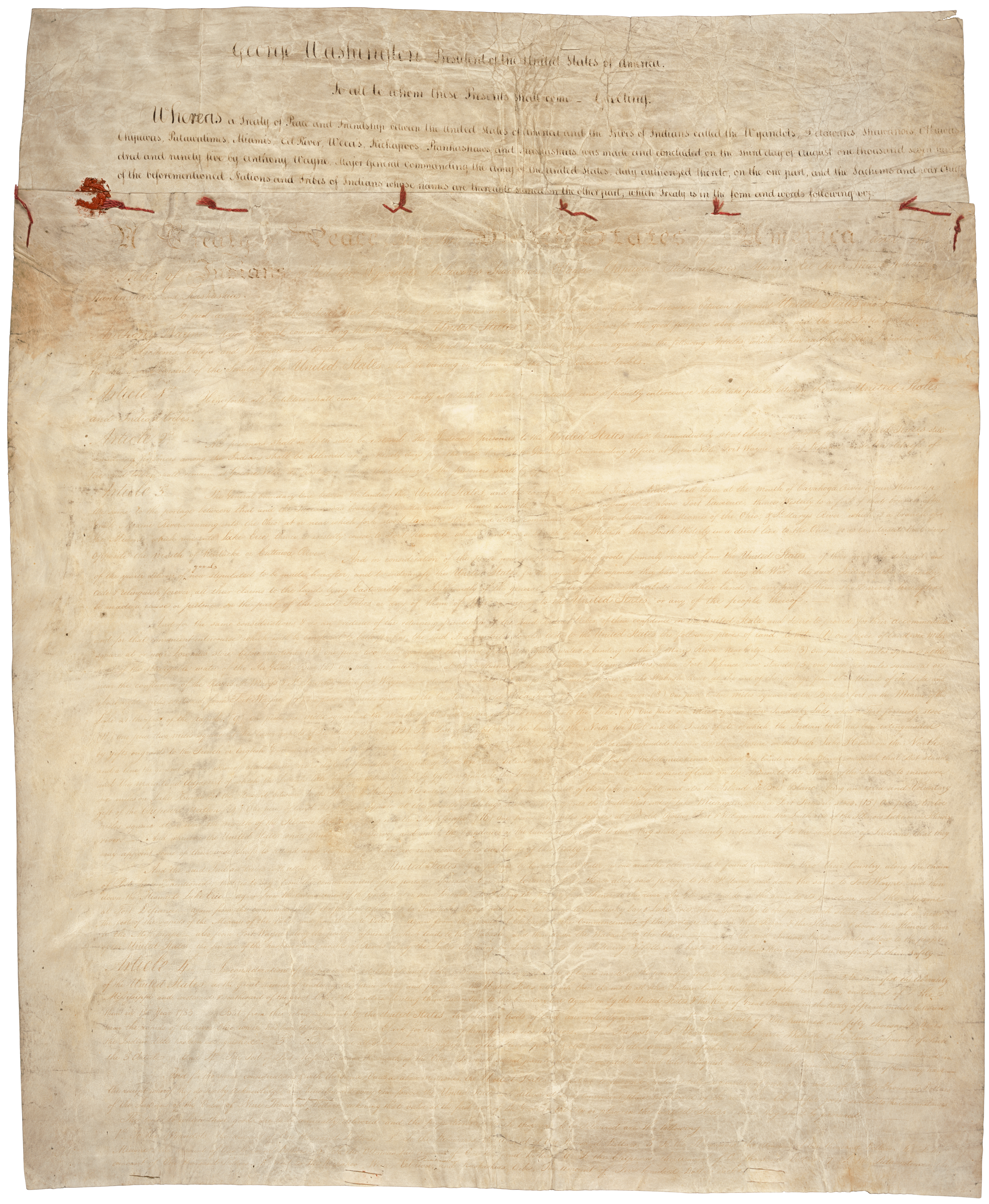
- First written page of the Treaty of Greenville, (Fort Greenville, Greenville, Ohio), August 3, 1795
- Context: Northwest Indian War (1785-1795)
- Signed: August 3, 1795
- Location: Fort Greenville (Greenville, Ohio)
- Ratified: December 22, 1795
- Parties: United States Wyandot; Delaware; Shawanee; Odawa; Chippewa; Potawatomi; Miami; Eel Rivers; Wea; Kickapoo; Piankeshaw; Kaskaskia
- Ratifiers: United States Senate
- Language: English

Full text
- Treaty of Greenville at Wikisource

The Treaty of Greenville, also known to Americans as the Treaty with the Wyandots, etc., but formally titled A treaty of peace between the United States of America, and the tribes of Indians called the Wyandots, Delawares, Shawanees, Ottawas, Chippewas, Pattawatimas, Miamis, Eel Rivers, Weas, Kickapoos, Piankeshaws, and Kaskaskias was a 1795 treaty between the United States and indigenous nations of the Northwest Territory (now Midwestern United States), including the Wyandot and Delaware peoples, that redefined the boundary between indigenous peoples' lands and territory for United States community settlement.

It was signed at Fort Greenville, now Greenville, Ohio, on August 3, 1795, following the Native American loss at the Battle of Fallen Timbers a year earlier in August 1794. It ended the Northwest Indian War of 1785–1795 in the Ohio Country of the old Northwest Territory (1787–1803), and limited Indian country to remaining lands of northwestern Ohio, and began the practice of annual payments of goods, supplies and food, following the land concessions. The parties to the treaty were a coalition of Native American tribes known as the Western Confederacy, and the United States government represented by new United States Army General Anthony Wayne (1745–1796), and local frontiersmen.

The treaty became synonymous with the end of the American frontier in the eastern United States, in that part of the old Northwest Territory that would become the new state of Ohio and other adjacent future federal territories and future states around the Great Lakes and further west to the Mississippi River.

== Participants ==
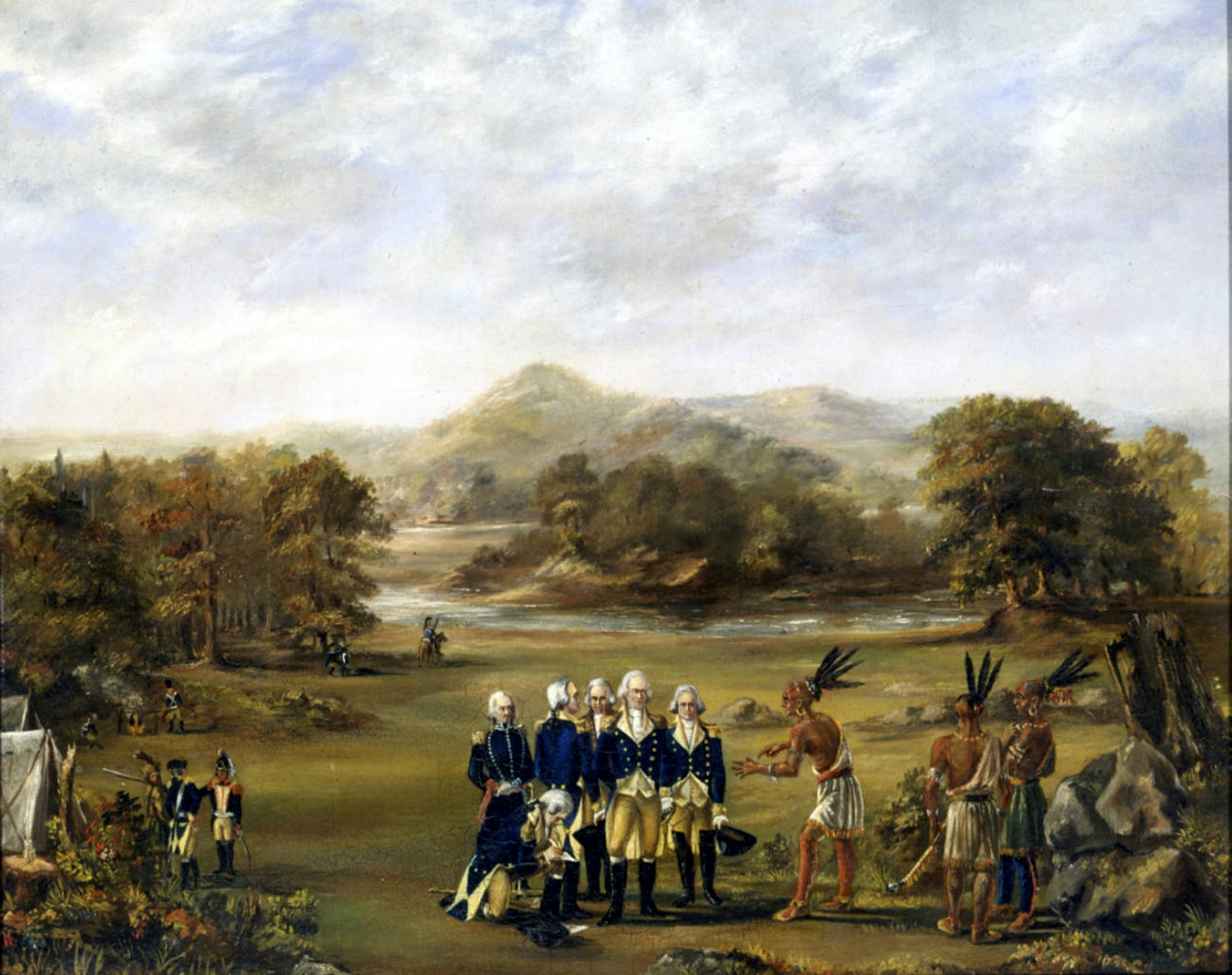
One of Anthony Wayne's officers may have painted the treaty negotiations, c. 1795.

General "Mad Anthony" Wayne (1745–1796), who had led the newly organized United States Army victory at the Battle of Fallen Timbers and led the American federal government delegation. Other members included William Wells (c. 1770 – 1812), William Henry Harrison (1773–1841), (future first Governor of Indiana Territory (1801–1812), U.S. Representative (congressman) and later U.S. Senator from Ohio, and ninth President, served March–April 1841), Caleb Swan (1758–1809), William Clark (1770–1838), and Meriwether Lewis (1774–1809) - the last two to become more famous a decade later (and for the subsequent two and quarter centuries), leading the Lewis and Clark exploring expedition (Corps of Discovery) of 1804–1806, into the new western Louisiana Purchase of 1803, up the Missouri River across the Great Plains, through the passes of the Rocky Mountains, to the Pacific Northwest region and the West Coast of North America on the Pacific Ocean and returning.

Native Americans leaders who signed the Fort Greenville treaty included leaders of these bands and tribes: Wyandot (chiefs Tarhe, Roundhead, and Leatherlips), Delaware (several bands including Chief Buckongahelas). Shawnee (chiefs Blue Jacket and Black Hoof), Ottawa (several bands, including Egushawa), Chippewa, Potawatomi (23 signatories, including Gomo, Siggenauk, Black Partridge, Topinabee, and Five Medals), Miami (including Jean Baptiste Richardville, White Loon, and Little Turtle), Wea, Kickapoo, and Kaskaskia.

Following their defeat at the Battle of Fallen Timbers in August 1794, and subsequent scorched earth tactics, General Wayne had courted the favor of several key leaders within the Western Confederacy. Wayne brought food supplies, and material for crops and promised to continue delivering new supplies. Blue Jacket, the Shawnee war chief who had led the Native American force at Fallen Timbers, encouraged others to accept Wayne's offered terms for peace. Tarhe declared that the victory at Fallen Timbers was evidence that the Great Spirit favored the newly arrived white men from across the mountains to the east and ocean, called Americans. Opposition to the United States was led by Little Turtle who, ironically, had advised against engaging Wayne at Fallen Timbers. For a week, Wayne urged the native tribes to accept peace based on previous terms given at the earlier agreements of the Treaty of Fort McIntosh, Treaty of Fort Finney, and Treaty of Fort Harmar, but Little Turtle countered that the Miami Tribe were not party to these treaties and would not recognize them, and that they were invalid because they were made with people who had no original right to the lands that they had sold.

General Wayne revealed to the chiefs that the U.S. Senate in Washington had recently ratified the Jay Treaty, between the Americans and the British, and what that would mean on the western frontier, ensuring that Great Britain in northern Canada (Quebec and Ontario), would no longer be providing additional aid, supplies, firearms and ammunition to the Native Americans. Tarhe confirmed that previous treaties had been signed by chiefs who were at Greenville and warned his fellow Indigenous tribal leaders that Wayne had the military power to take all of their lands if they did not negotiate. Little Turtle and the Miami remained the lone dissent in the natives' confederacy. At a private council between Wayne and Little Turtle on August 12, Wayne argued that the Miami chief was standing against the will of the confederacy majority. Little Turtle reluctantly signed, stating that he was the last to sign, and would therefore be the last to break the treaty, even though he disagreed with the terms.

The day after the Treaty of Greenville was signed, Little Turtle's wife died in camp. She was carried to a grave by U.S. Army soldiers and given a three-gun salute of typical American military ceremonies.

The treaty was signed back in the temporary United States federal national capital city of Philadelphia, by first President George Washington and submitted and later ratified by the United States Senate on December 22, 1795.

== Terms ==
The treaty consisted of ten articles.

=== Land for annuity ===
The treaty established what became known as the Greenville Treaty Line, as delineated below. For several years, it distinguished Native American territory from lands open to European-American settlers, who, however, continued to encroach. In exchange for goods to the value of $20,000 (such as blankets, utensils, and domestic animals), the Native American tribes ceded to the United States large parts of modern-day Ohio.

The treaty also established the "annuity" system of payment in return for Native American cessions of land east of the treaty line. Yearly grants of federal money and supplies of calico cloth to Native American tribes. That institutionalized continuing government influence in tribal affairs and gave outsiders considerable control over Native American life.

=== Treaty line ===
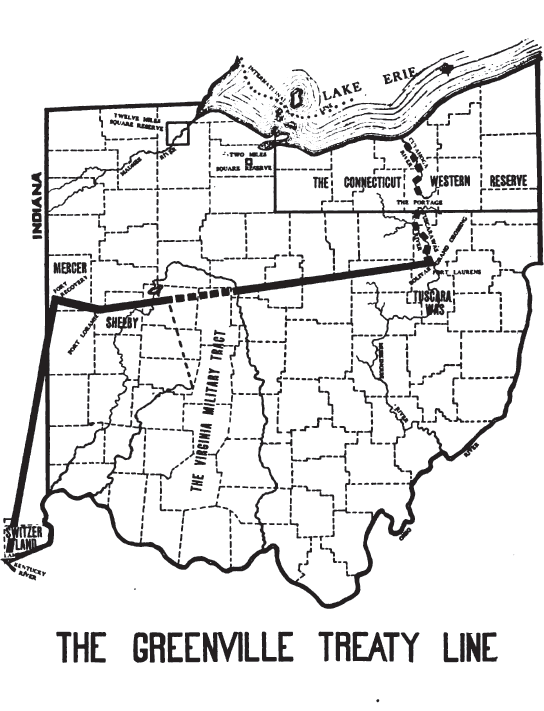
The Greenville Treaty line in Ohio and Indiana

The treaty redefined with slight modifications the boundaries in Ohio established previously by the Treaty of Fort McIntosh in 1785 and reasserted in the Treaty of Fort Harmar in 1789. In particular, the western boundary, which formerly ran northwesterly to the Maumee River, now ran southerly to the Ohio River.

Ohio had developed settlements and defined tracts of land prior to 1795, including the Western Reserve, the Seven Ranges survey area, the Virginia Military District, Symmes Purchase, and two Ohio Company purchases, all in eastern and southern Ohio, as well as the line of western forts built by Wayne through Fort Recovery along the Great Miami River valley. The boundary line would need to encompass all those territories, covering about two thirds of Ohio Country.

The treaty line began at the mouth of the Cuyahoga River in present-day Cleveland and ran south along the river to the portage between the Cuyahoga and Tuscarawas Rivers in what is now Akron, then through the Portage Lakes area between Akron and Canton. The line continued down the Tuscarawas to Fort Laurens, near present-day Bolivar. From there, the line ran west-southwest to near present-day Fort Loramie on a branch of the Great Miami River. From there, the line ran west-northwest to Fort Recovery on the Wabash River near the present-day boundary between Ohio and Indiana. From Fort Recovery, the line ran south-southwest to the Ohio River at a point opposite the mouth of the Kentucky River in present-day Carrollton, Kentucky. Rufus Putnam, who had been appointed by George Washington as surveyor general of the United States, surveyed and marked the Treaty Line.

=== Other parcels of land ===
There were also other forts along the Great Lakes, such as Fort Miamis and other forts in Indiana, Michigan, and Ohio that the British had agreed to cede to the United States in the 1783 Treaty of Paris but had yet to evacuate. In Indiana, there was the Vincennes Tract, Clark's Grant, and the settlement at Ouiatenon to protect.

The treaty also permitted established US Army posts and allocated strategic reserved tracts to the federal government within the Indian Country to the north and the west of the ceded lands, the most important of which was the future site of Fort Dearborn (now Downtown Chicago) on Lake Michigan. (Note: Six square miles centered at the mouth of the Chicago River. See Article 3, Item 14, in the text of the treaty.) Other American lands within Indian Country included Fort Detroit, Ouiatenon, Fort Wayne, Fort Miami, and Fort Sandusky.

The treaty exempted established settlements at St. Vincennes, General Clark's grant, various French settlements, and Fort Massac from relinquishment.

=== Miscellaneous provisions ===
The United States renounced all claims to indigenous peoples' lands not within the treaty line in Ohio or parcels exempted. The indigenous groups were obliged to recognize the United States as the sole sovereign power in the entire territory, but the local peoples would otherwise have free use of their own lands as long as they were kindly disposed to American settlers. The treaty also arranged for an exchange of prisoners and specified the parties that would be responsible for enforcing the boundary and punishing transgressions.

== Criticism ==
After the signing of the treaty, the so-called "peace chiefs"—such as Little Turtle—who advocated for cooperation with the United States, were roundly criticized by Shawnee chief Tecumseh, who stated that the peace chiefs had given away land that they did not own. Tecumseh fought against the Americans during the War of 1812 and was killed in battle in 1813.

== Aftermath ==
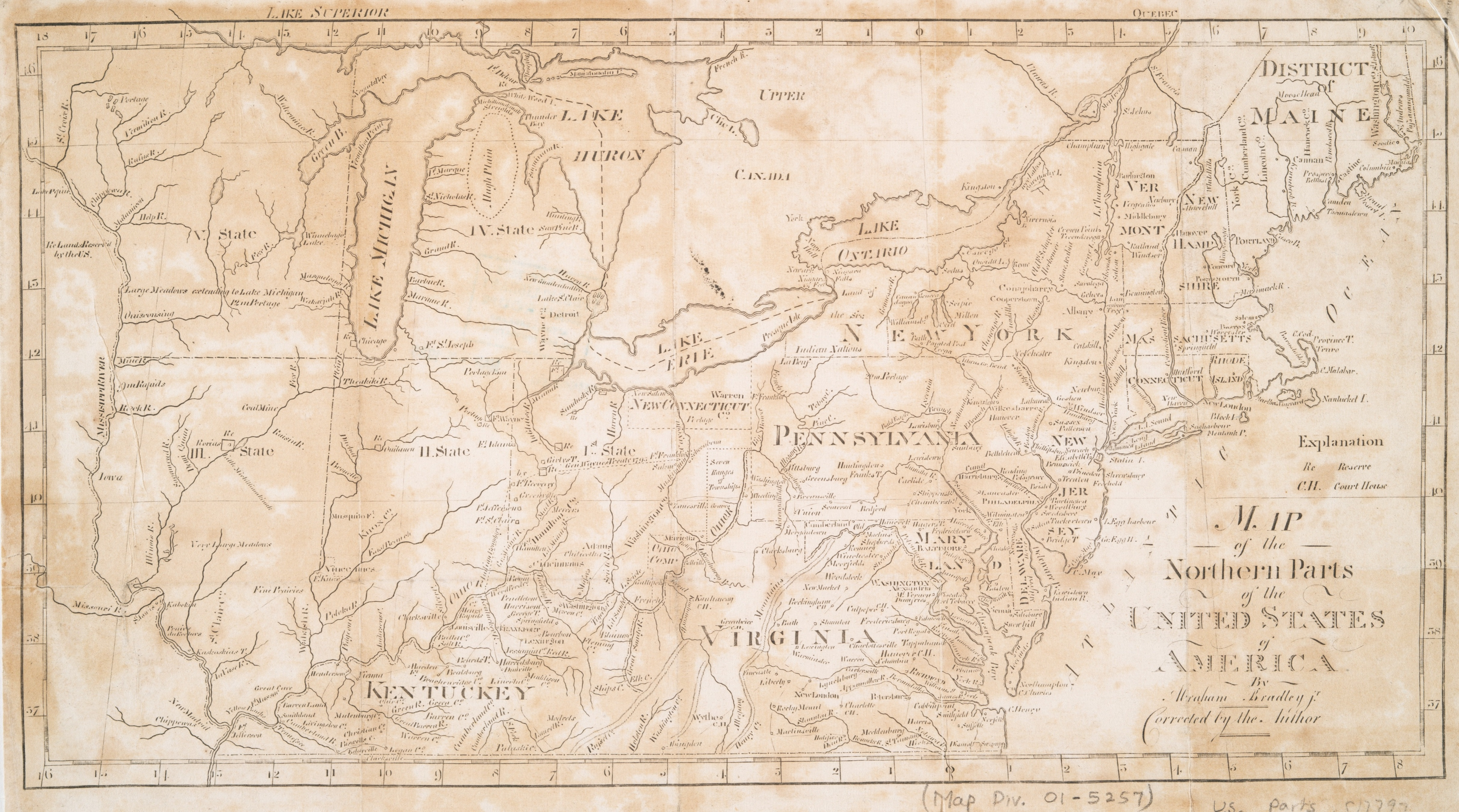
1805 map showing western "Indian Boundary" between Port William and Fort Recovery, as well as the northern "Gen Wayne Treaty 1795" boundary between Fort Recovery and the Muskingum River 40mi. west of Salem. Much of the land east and south of these boundaries was open to settlement after the Treaty of Greenville.

The negotiated peace was only temporary. Anthony Wayne, who promised to protect the treaty, would die a year later. His second-in-command, James Wilkinson, who may have murdered Wayne with poison, and was later found to be a spy for Spain, never enforced the treaty. Continuing encroachments by settlers on Indian Country north and west of the treaty line (and of future treaty lines established by the Treaty of Vincennes, Treaty of Grouseland, and Treaty of Fort Wayne of 1809), especially in Indiana, would lead a disgruntled Tecumseh, who had not signed the Treaty of Greenville, to reform the Confederacy at Prophetstown over the following decade. Unrest among the tribes culminated in the Battle of Tippecanoe in 1811, a major defeat for indigenous nations that may have contributed to their siding with the British in the War of 1812.

The Treaty of Greenville closed the frontier in the Northwest Territory. Thereafter began a series of purchases of indigenous peoples' lands by treaty and Indigenous tribe removals by law throughout the territory and its successors, interrupted briefly by the War of 1812. Indians were moved west of the Mississippi River to Indian Country reservations in what later became the state of Oklahoma in a process that culminated with the dismantling of the Great Miami Reserve in Indiana by treaties in the 1830s. By 1840, the Old Northwest was essentially clear of indigenous peoples. Future conflicts would all be west of the Mississippi.

The treaty line would become the southwestern boundary of the Northwest Territory at its division in 1800. Upon Ohio statehood in 1803, the western boundary of Ohio ran due north from a place on the Ohio River somewhat east of the south-southwesterly treaty line, leaving a sliver of land called "The Gore" in what is today southeastern Indiana remaining as part of the Northwest Territory. "The Gore" was ceded to Indiana Territory at that time, and became Dearborn County in March 1803.

Meriwether Lewis and William Henry Harrison were both present at the treaty signing. The former would go on to launch the Lewis and Clark Expedition with William Clark in 1804, and the latter would later become the 9th President of the United States in 1841.

Fort Greenville was abandoned in 1796; it would be another 12 years before the settlement of Greenville, Ohio, was founded on the site.

It was the last treaty signed by Gen. Wayne, who died just over a year later, in December 1796.

== Depictions ==
A painting commemorating the treaty hangs in the Ohio Statehouse. It was completed by Ohio artist Howard Chandler Christy. At 23 feet (7.0 m) wide, it is the largest painting in the Ohio Statehouse.

== Gallery ==
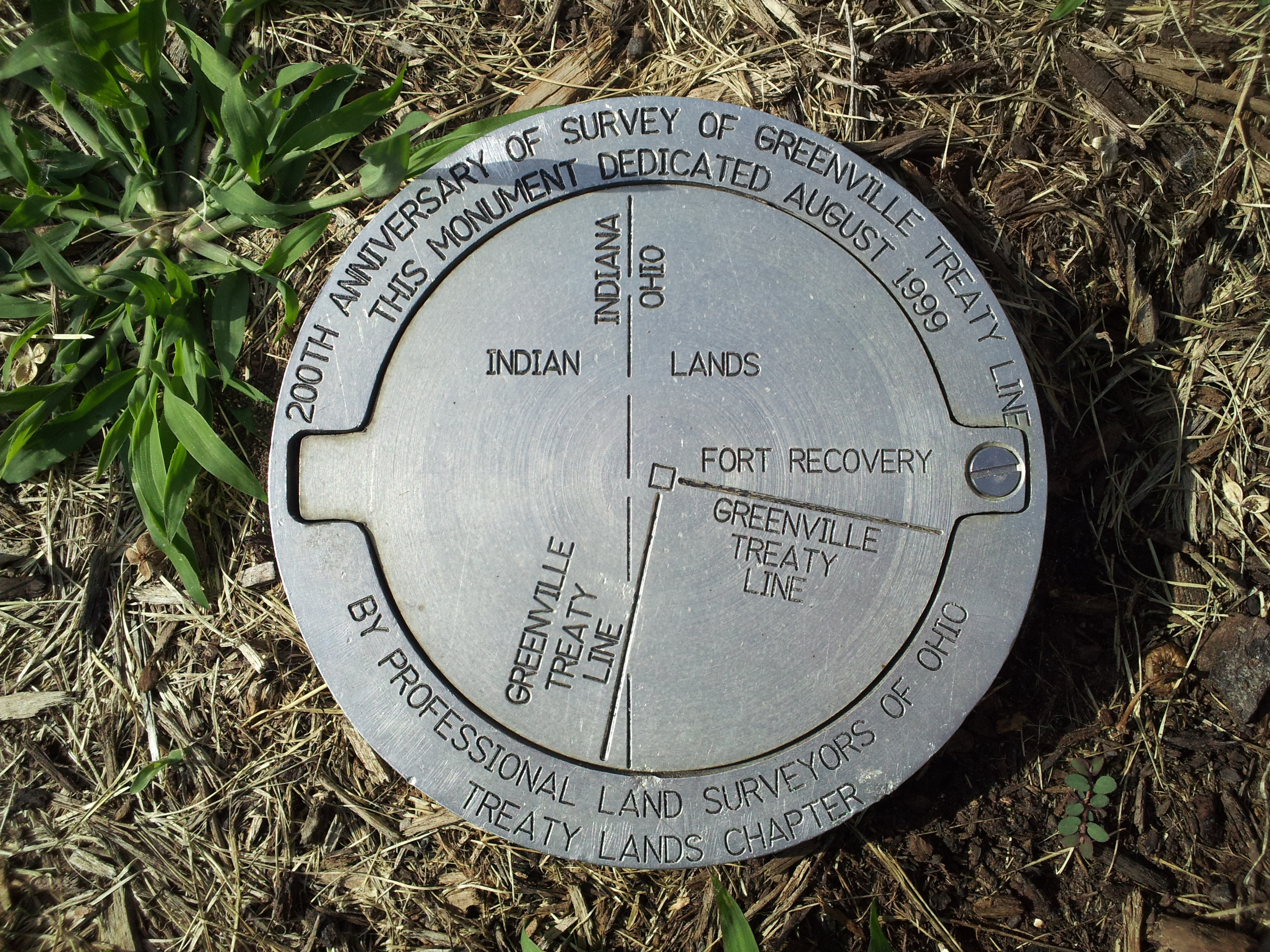

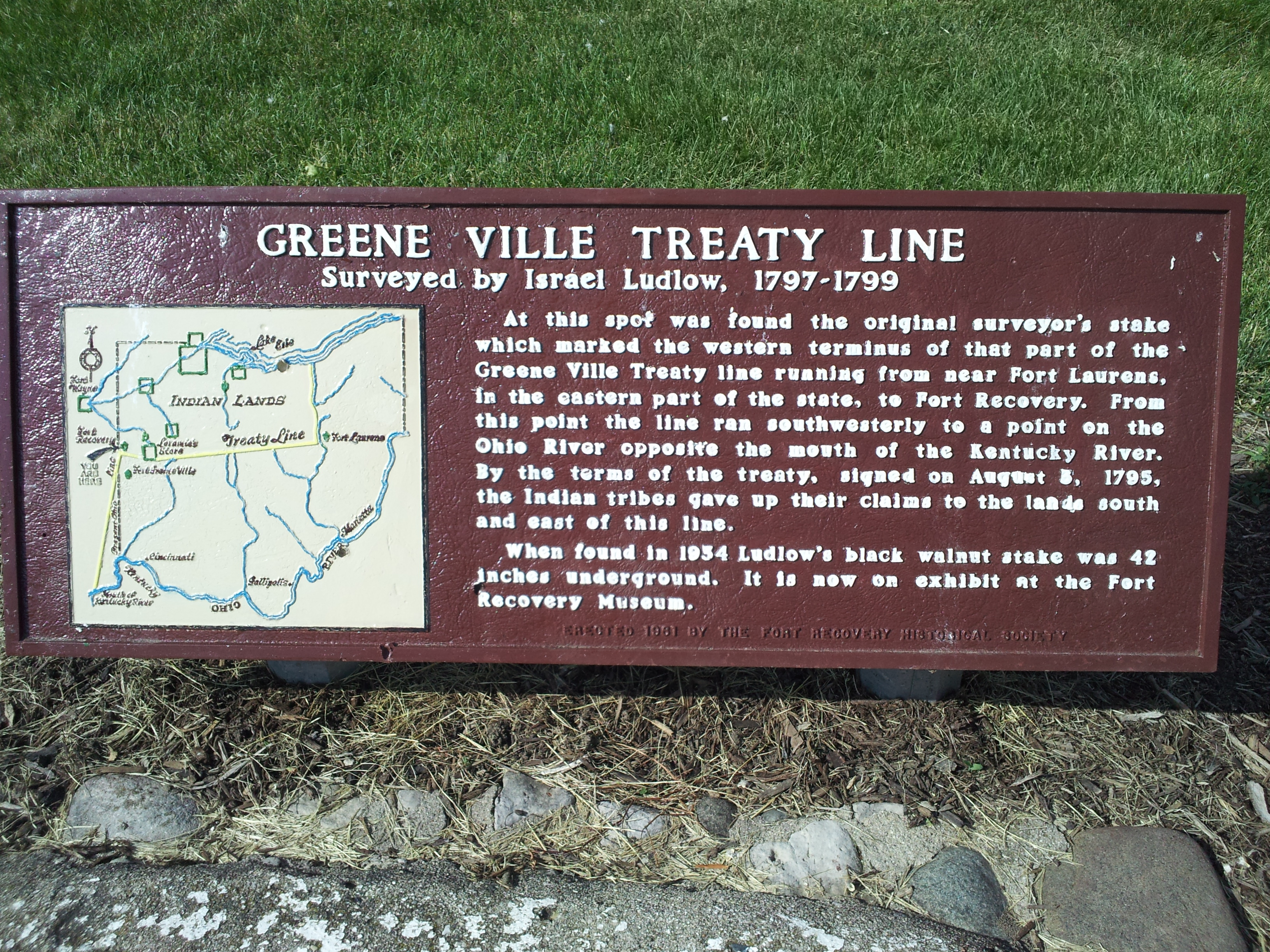

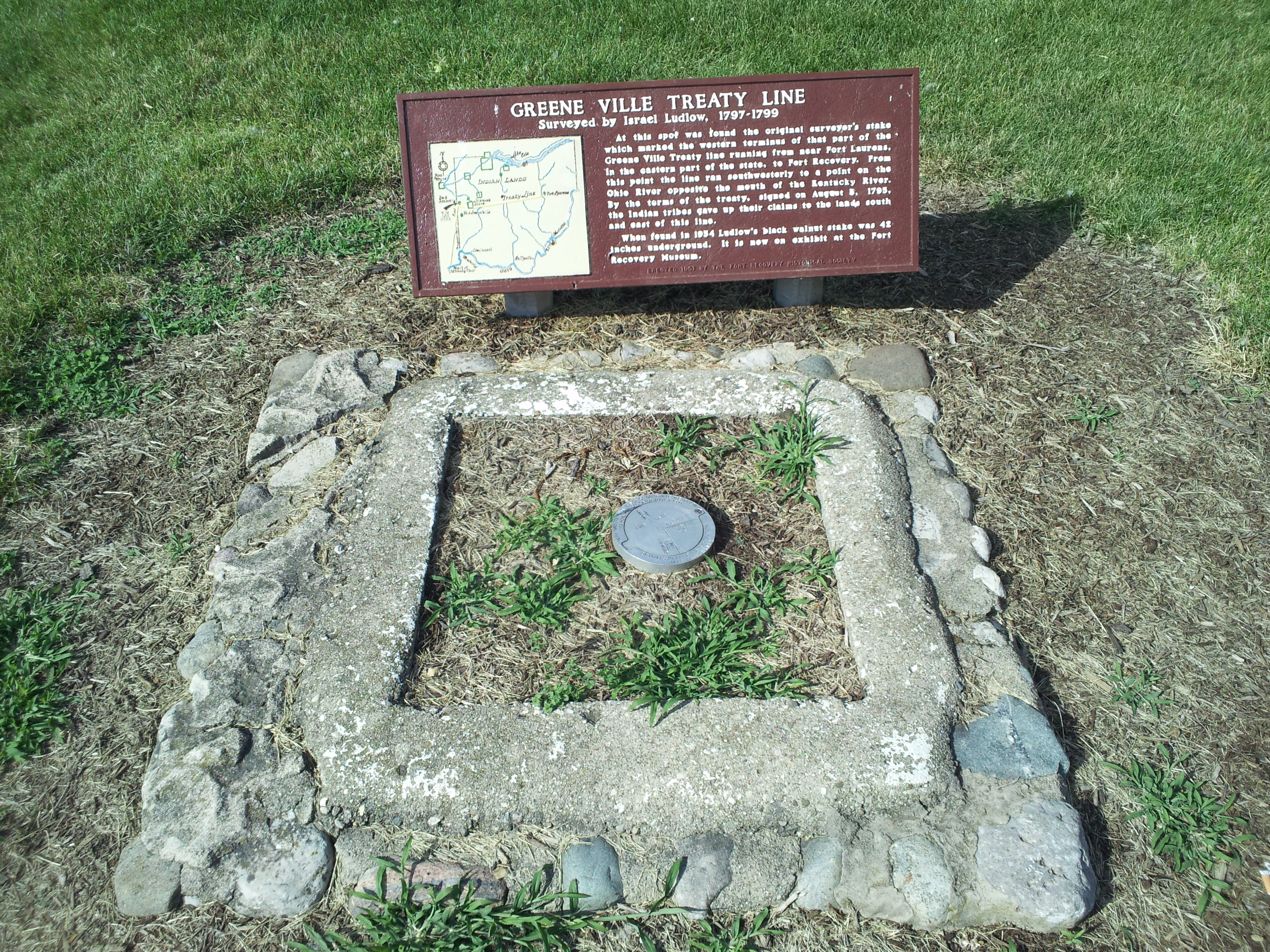

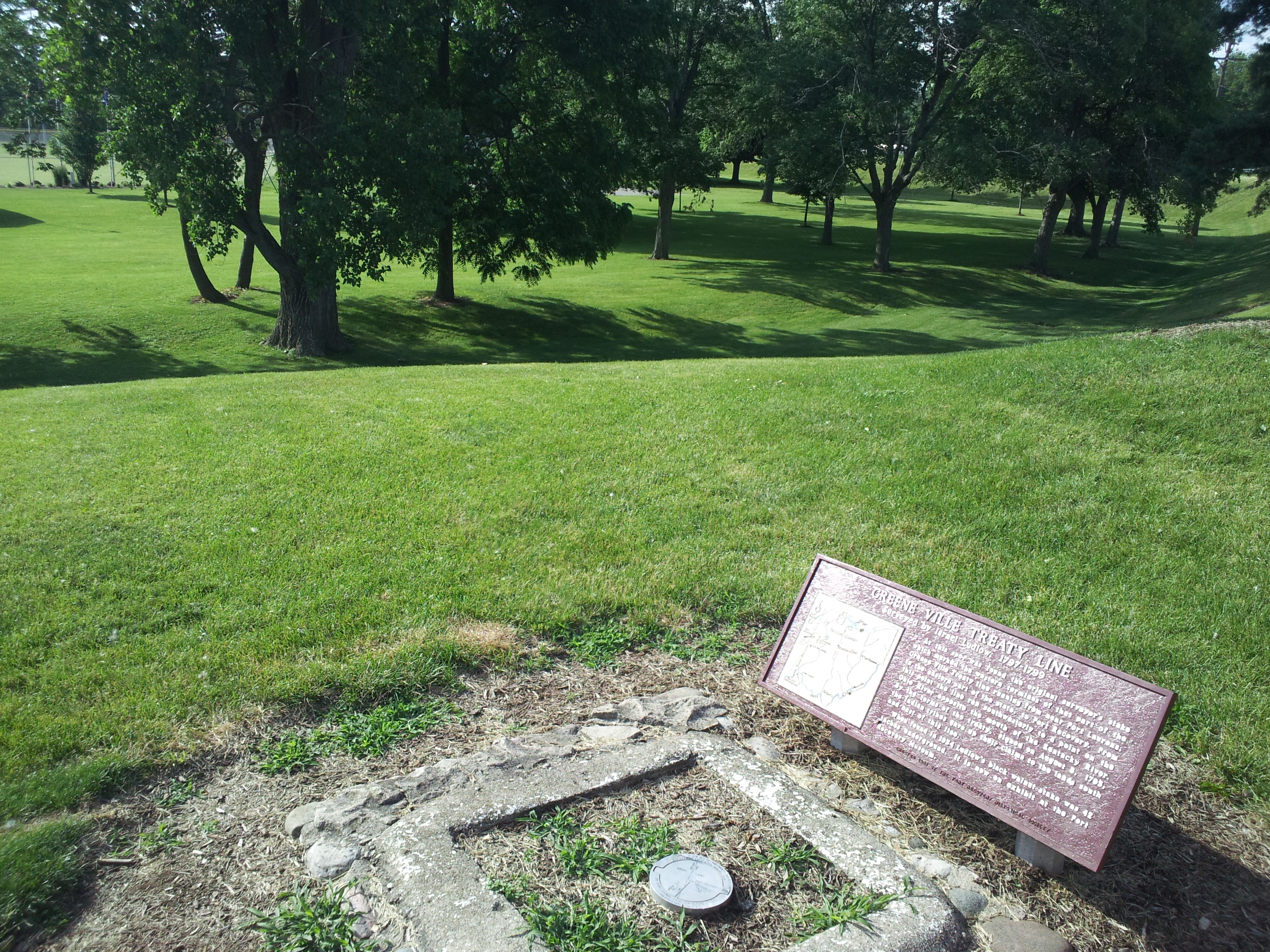

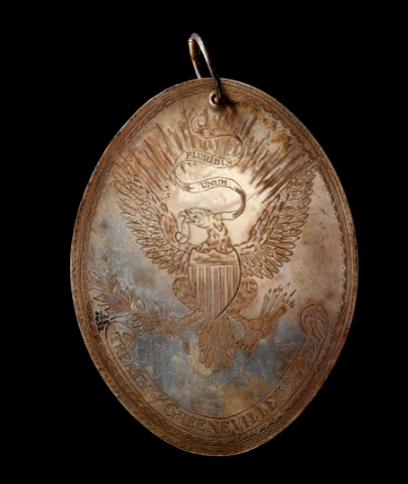
Treaty of Greenville medal

== See also ==
- List of Native American treaties
