= Congress Lands North of Old Seven Ranges =

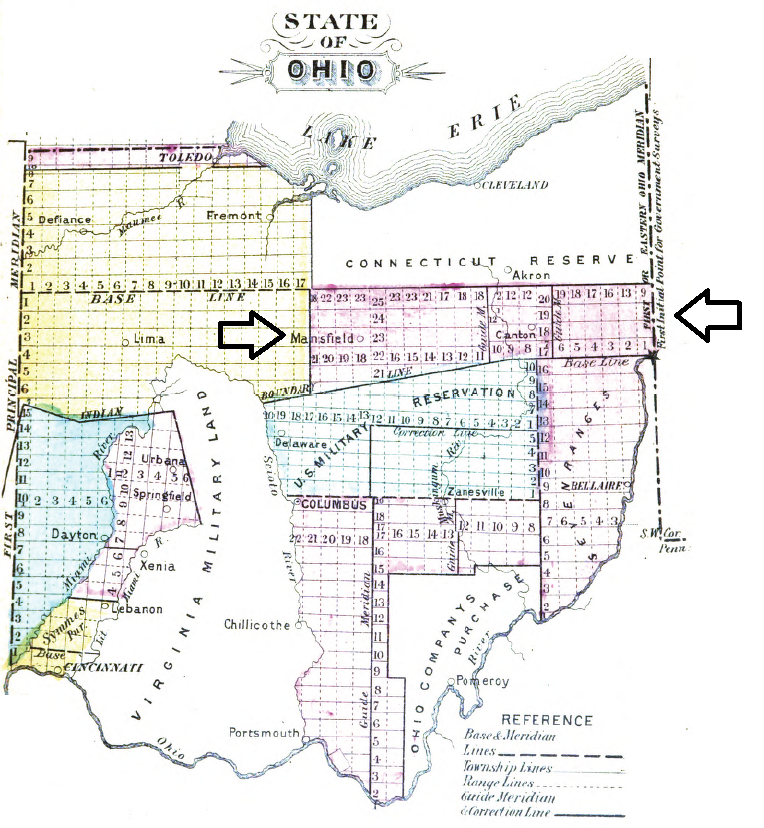
The Congress Lands North of the Old Seven Ranges lies between the arrows in Ohio

The Congress Lands North of the Old Seven Ranges was a land tract in northeast Ohio that was established by the Congress early in the 19th century. It is located south of the Connecticut Western Reserve and Firelands, east of the Congress Lands South and East of the First Principal Meridian, north of the United States Military District and Seven Ranges, and west of Pennsylvania.

== History ==
Acquired by Great Britain from France following the 1763 Treaty of Paris, the Ohio Country had been closed to white settlement by the Proclamation of 1763. The United States claimed the region after the 1783 Treaty of Paris that ended the American Revolutionary War. The Congress passed the Land Ordinance of 1785 as a formal means of surveying, selling, and settling the land and raising revenue. Land was to be systematically surveyed into square "townships", six miles (9.656 km) on a side created by lines running north–south intersected by east–west lines. Townships were to be arranged in north–south rows called ranges. These townships were sub-divided into thirty-six "sections" of one square mile (2.59 km^{2}) or 640 acres. These ranges, townships, and sections were to be systematically numbered.

The first north–south line, Eastern Ohio Meridian, was to be the western boundary of Pennsylvania, sometimes called Ellicott's Line after Andrew Ellicott, who had been in charge of surveying it, and the first east–west line (called the Geographer's Line or Base Line) was to begin where the Pennsylvania boundary touched the north bank of the Ohio River, the Beginning Point of the U.S. Public Land Survey40°38′33″N 80°31′10″W. The Geographer's Line was to extend westward through “the whole territory” which at that time was meant to include lands lying between the Ohio River and Lake Erie.

A problem with this plan was that Connecticut had a claim on lands north of the 41st parallel north latitude. Thus, on May 9, 1786, Congress instructed Thomas Hutchins, Geographer of the United States, to continue his survey only south of the Geographers line. Hutchins group completed surveying seven ranges by 1787, and presented plats to Congress in 1788 for the tract that became known as the Seven Ranges.

On June 1, 1796, Congress created the United States Military District, sometimes called the USMD Lands, or USMD Survey. The district was west of the Old Seven Ranges and south of the Greenville Treaty Line.

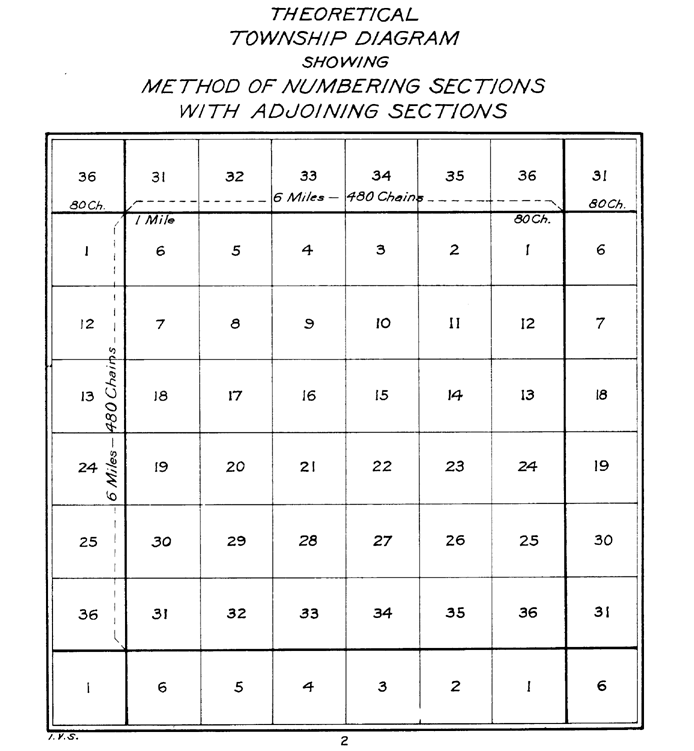
United States General Land Office plan for numbering sections of a standard survey township, adopted May 18, 1796

== The Survey ==
An un-surveyed tract of land in eastern Ohio remained north of the Seven Ranges and Military District, and south of the Connecticut Western Reserve. In that gap, extending westward from the Pennsylvania line to the Tuscarawas River, lands were surveyed circa 1801 under the Act of May 18, 1796. The ranges and townships followed those of the original Seven Ranges, ranges being numbered westward from Pennsylvania, and townships within each range numbered from south to north starting at the Ohio River, known as the Ohio River Base, thus having townships in adjacent ranges with different numbers. Sections were numbered according to the 1796 pattern.

The Treaty of Greenville in 1795 had established land west of the Tuscarawas as reserved for Indians, and not open to American settlement. With the Treaty of Fort Industry in 1805, Indian land west of the Tuscarawas River, between Lake Eire and the Greeneville Treaty Line, and east of a line 120 miles west of Pennsylvania, or about 82° 51' W longitude, was ceded by six tribes. Congress Lands in this ceded area were surveyed 1806–07. This survey had six mile square townships and continued the range, township, and section numbering system of the Ohio River Survey, section numbering being based on the 1796 land act.

The two surveys of 1801 and 1806-07 became known as the Congress Lands North of the Old Seven Ranges.

=== Muskingum River Survey ===
This area consists of only two townships, within the Congress Lands North of the Old Seven Ranges and bounded on the north by the Connecticut Western Reserve. Townships are numbered 1 and 2 north, and the range is 10 west. The range continues the numbering of the Ohio River Survey. This survey was conducted in 1800. The civil townships of Lawrence Township, Stark County, Ohio and Franklin Township, Summit County, Ohio correspond to this survey.

=== Land Sales ===
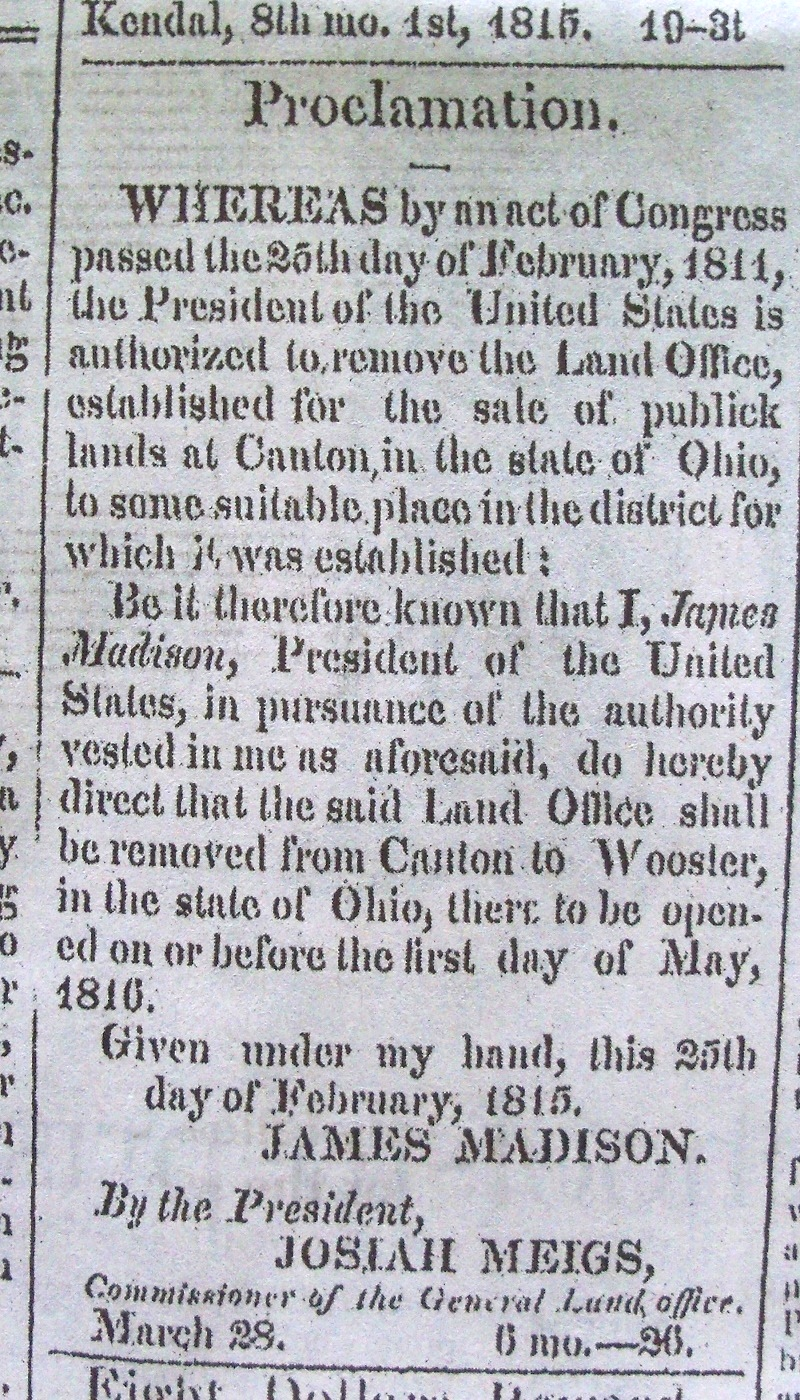
The land office was moved from Canton to Wooster

Section 4 of the Land Act of May 18, 1796 provided that the lands between the Seven Ranges and the Western Reserve be sold at “Pittsburg“. The Land Act of May 10, 1800 established the Steubenville Federal Land Office for sale of these lands. The Act of March 3, 1807 established a land office for the Congress Lands North of Old Seven Ranges that ended up in Canton, creating the Canton Land District. The Act of February 25, 1811 moved the office to Wooster but kept the name Canton Land District. Sales were also conducted from the nation's capital at the United States General Land Office. Local offices were eventually closed. The State of Ohio also eventually sold lands granted to them by the federal government, such as section 16 of each township.

== Modern times ==
The Tract today includes all or part of these counties in Ohio: Ashland, Carroll, Columbiana, Crawford, Holmes, Knox, Mahoning, Morrow, Richland, Stark, Summit, and Wayne.

== See also ==
- Ohio Lands
- Congress Lands
- Historic regions of the United States
