= Historical regions of the United States =

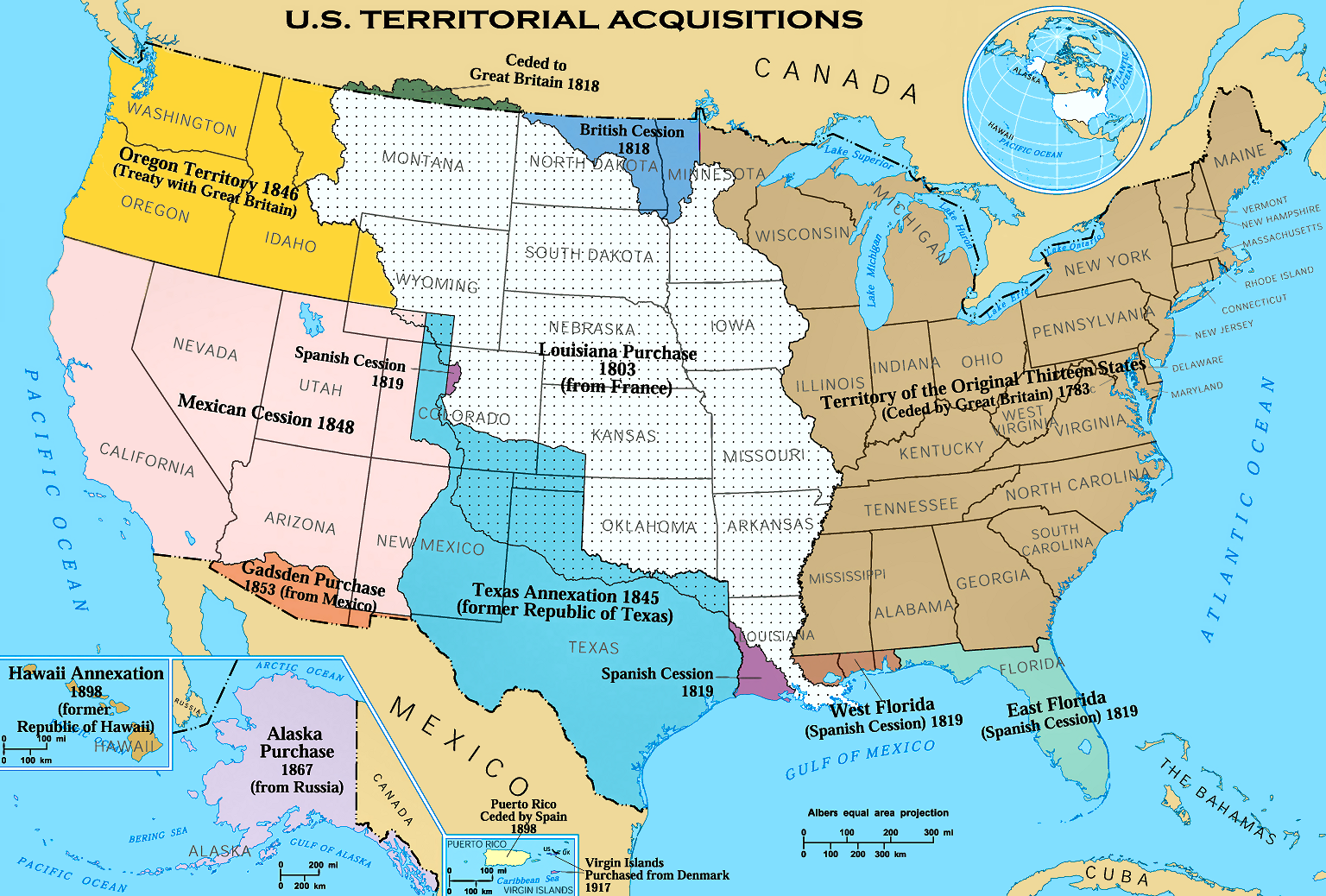
National Atlas map of United States territorial acquisitions

The territory of the United States and its overseas possessions has evolved over time, from the colonial era to the present day. It includes formally organized territories, proposed and failed states, unrecognized breakaway states, international and interstate purchases, cessions, and land grants, and historical military departments and administrative districts. The last section lists informal regions from American vernacular geography known by popular nicknames and linked by geographical, cultural, or economic similarities, some of which are still in use today.

For a more complete list of regions and subdivisions of the United States used in modern times, see List of regions of the United States.

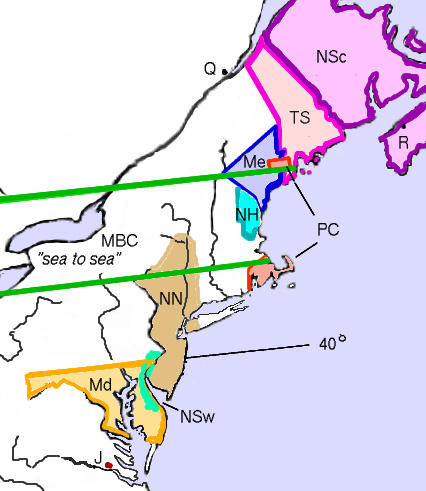
Map showing mid 17th century claims and land grant boundaries. Some colonies seen here are: Nova Scotia (NSc), Territory of Sagadahock (TS), First Province of Maine (Me), New Hampshire (NH), Plymouth (PC), Massachusetts Bay (MBC), New Netherland (NN), New Sweden (NSw), and Lord Baltimore's Land (Md; Maryland)

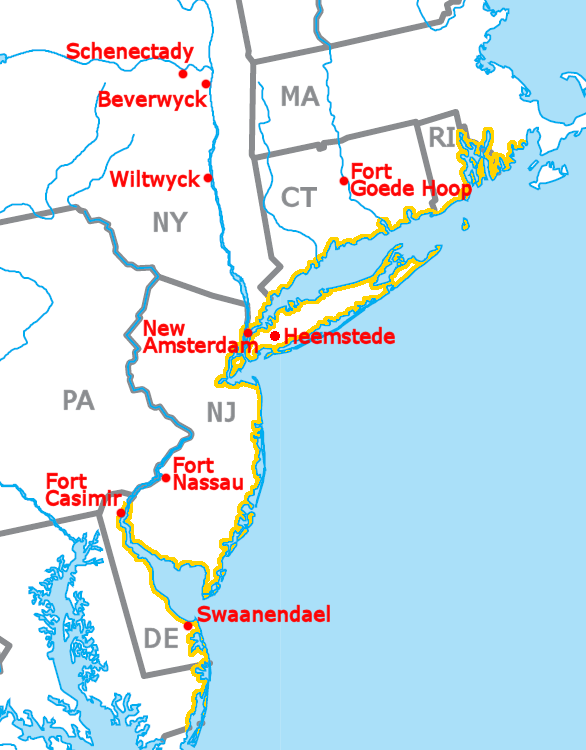
New World settlements of The Netherlands, collectively called New Netherland

== Colonial era (before 1776) ==
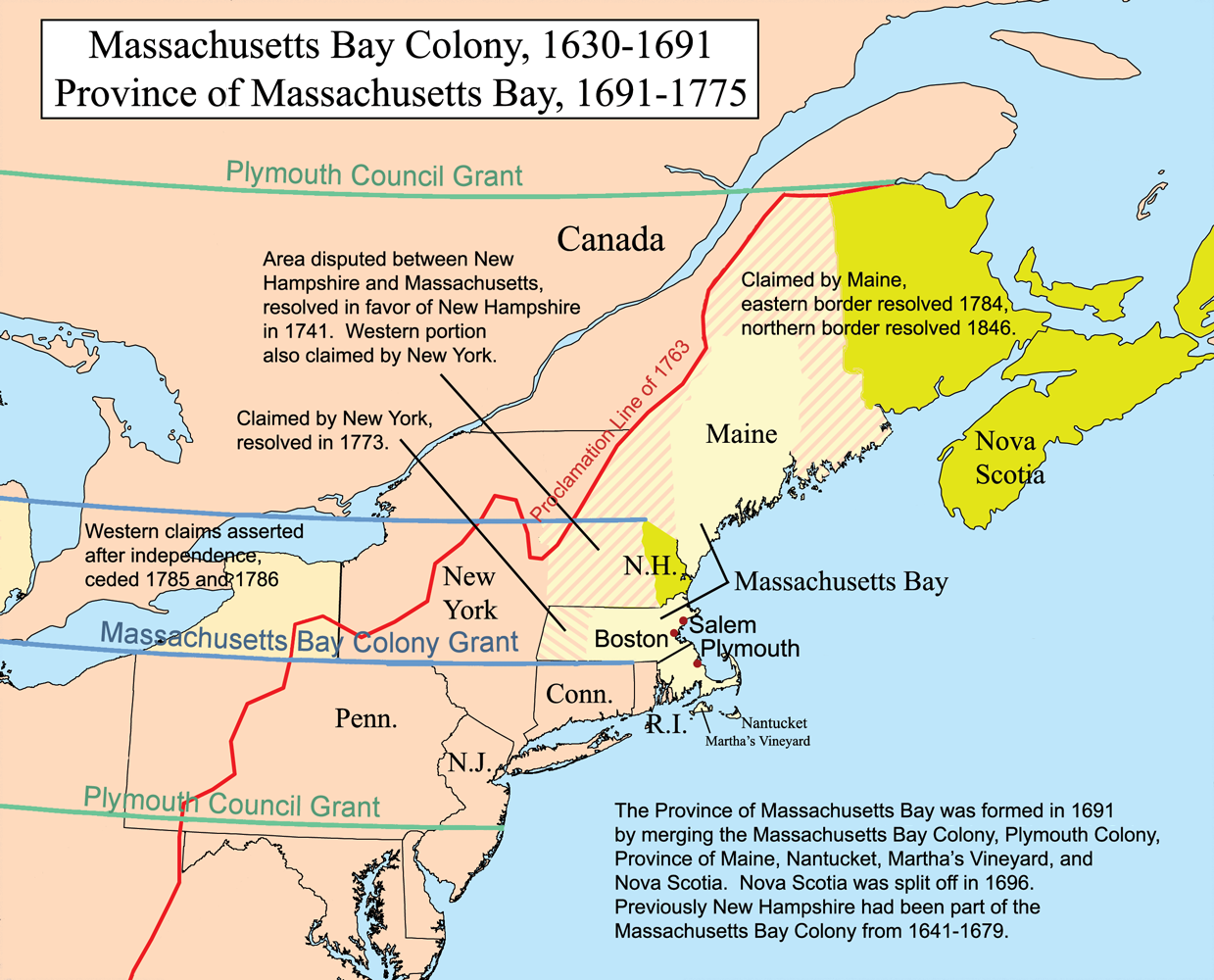
The Massachusetts Bay Colony

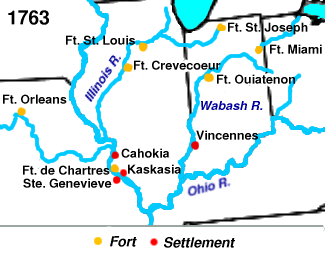
French settlements and forts in the so-called Illinois Country, 1763, which encompassed parts of the modern day states of Illinois, Missouri, Indiana and Kentucky)

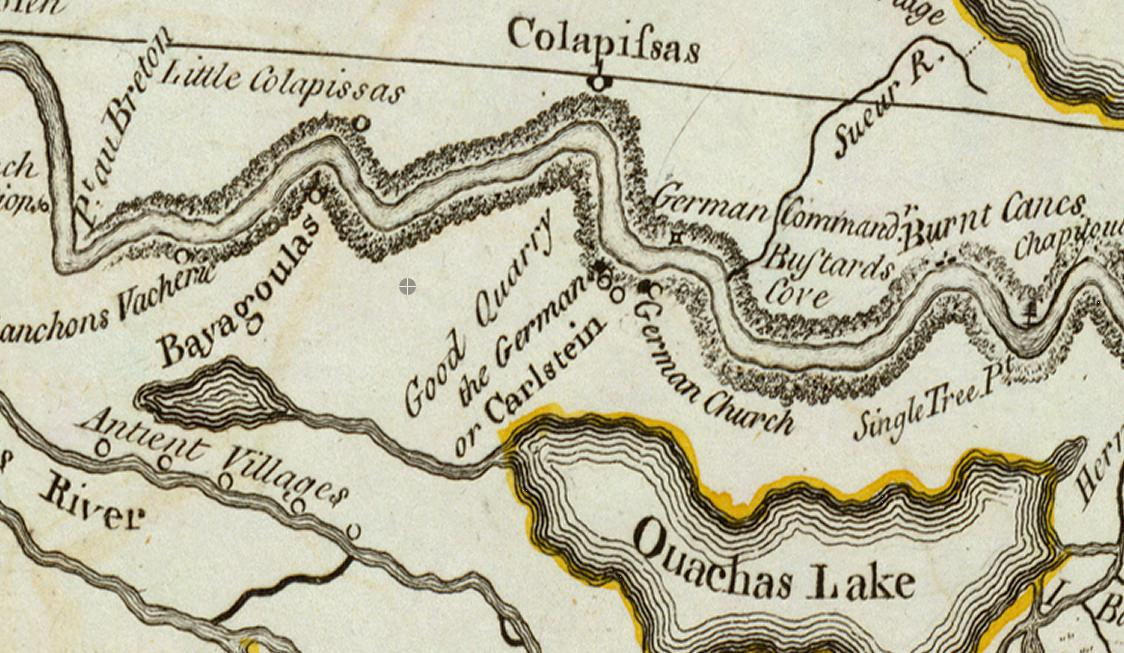
A 1775 map of the German Coast, a historical region of present-day Louisiana located above New Orleans on the eastern bank of the Mississippi River

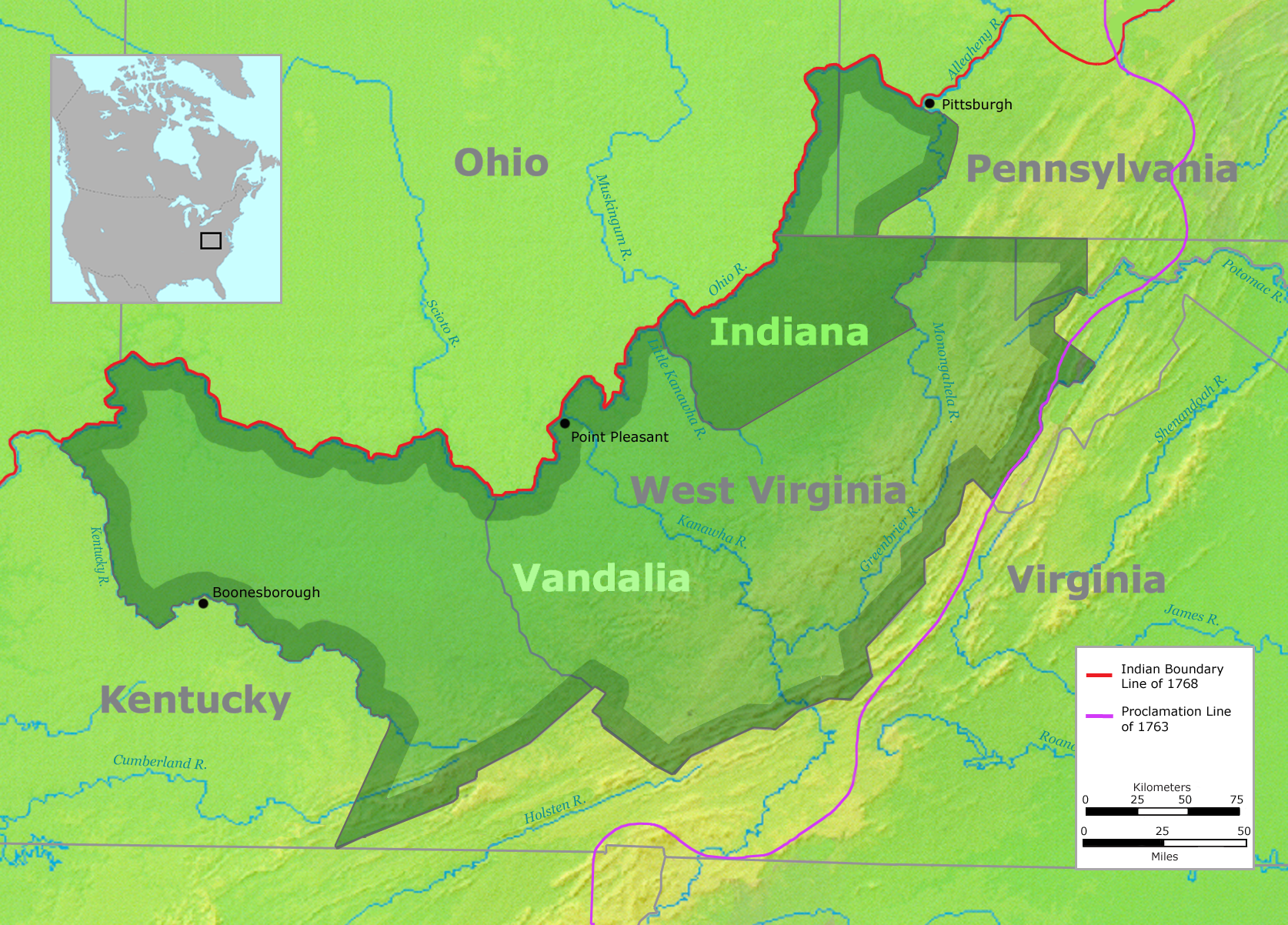
Vandalia was the name of a proposed British colony located south of the Ohio River, primarily in what is now the U.S. states of West Virginia and eastern Kentucky

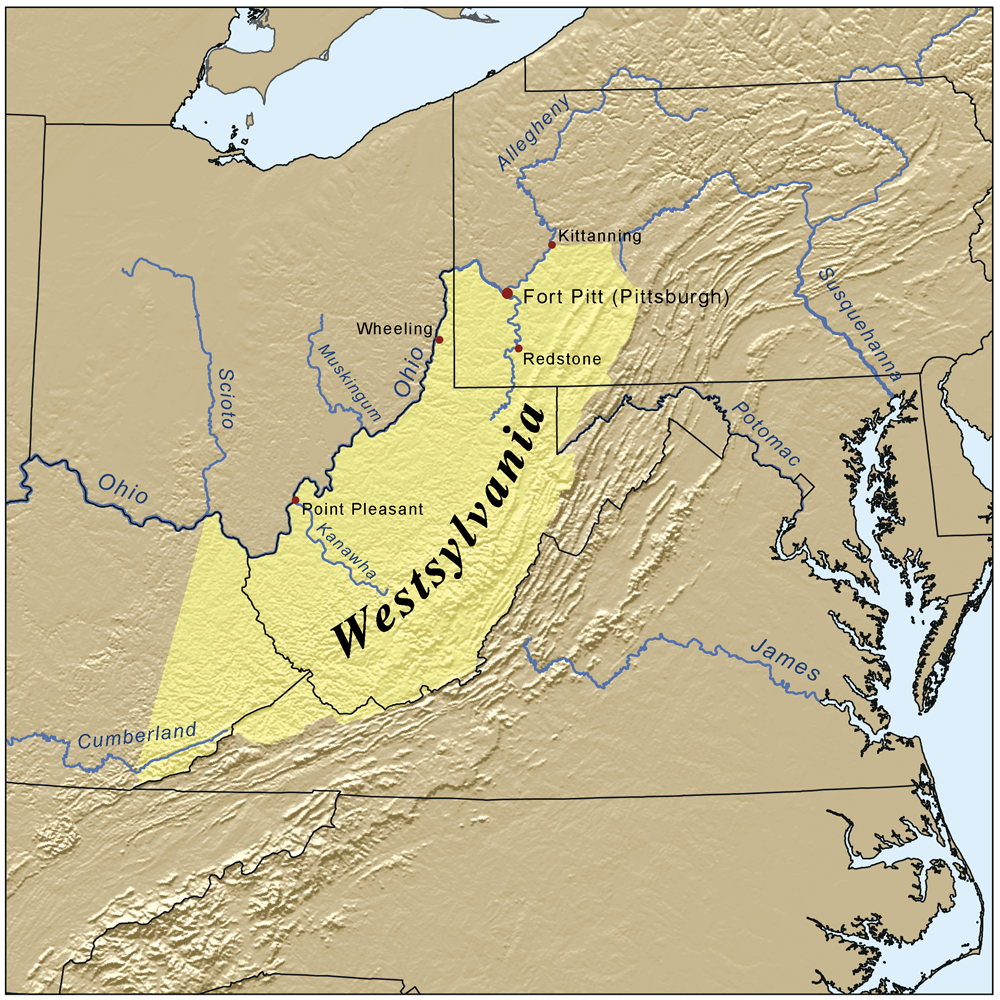
A proposal for the creation of Westsylvania was largely deterred by the Revolutionary War

=== Thirteen Colonies ===
- Connecticut Colony
- Delaware Colony
- Province of Georgia
- Province of Maryland
- Province of Massachusetts Bay
- Province of New Hampshire
- Province of New Jersey
- Province of New York
- Province of North Carolina
- Province of Pennsylvania
- Colony of Rhode Island and Providence Plantations
- Province of South Carolina
- Colony and Dominion of Virginia

=== Pre-Revolutionary War regions ===
† - indicates failed legal entities

==== New England ====
- Acadia
- Dominion of New England†
- Equivalent Lands
- King's College Tract
- Provinces of Maine†
  - Territory of Sagadahock
  - Popham Colony (or Sagadahoc Colony)†
  - Gorges-Mason Grant†
  - Mason Lands
  - Gorges Patent†
    - Lygonia Patent†
    - New Somersetshire†
  - Muscongus Patent (also known as the Waldo Patent and, eventually, the Bingham Purchase)
- Massachusetts Bay Colony
  - Narragansett Country†
- New Hampshire Grants
- New Haven Colony
- Plymouth Colony
- Saybrook Colony
- Wessagusset Colony†

==== Mid-Atlantic ====
- Granville District
- East Jersey
- West Jersey
- New Netherland and its settlements
- New Sweden†

==== Southern ====
- Province of Carolina
- Fort Caroline†
- Charlesfort†
- La Florida
  - San Agustín (St. Augustine)
  - San Miguel de Gualdape† (in present-day South Carolina)
  - Mocama Province†
- Jamestown
- Natchez District
- Northern Neck Proprietary (or "Fairfax Grant")
- The Lost Colony of Roanoke†
- Stuarts Town†

==== Interior ====
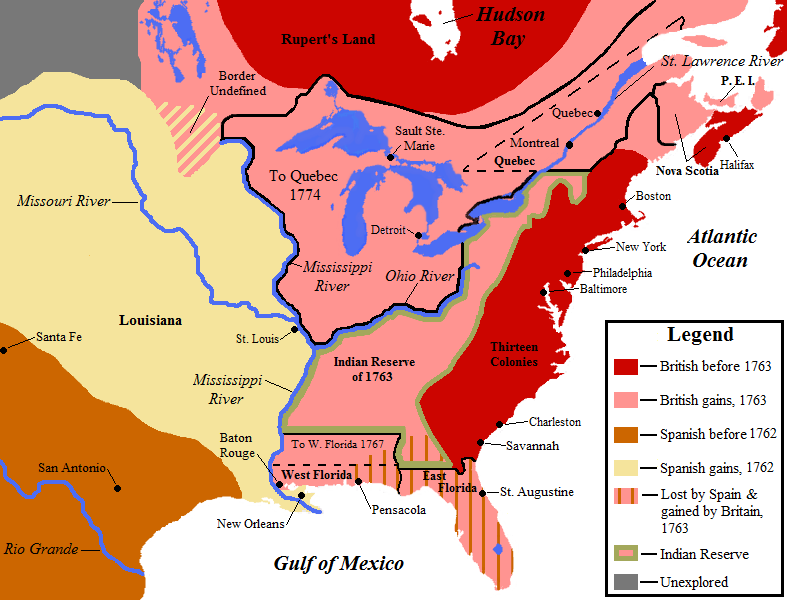
Map showing North American territorial boundaries leading up to the American Revolution and the founding of the United States: British claims are indicated in red and pink, while Spanish claims are in orange and yellow.

- District of West Augusta
- Illinois Country
- Indiana Company
- The Indian Reserve
- Ohio Country (or The Ohio Company of Virginia)†
- Province of Quebec (lower portion below the Great Lakes)

==== Far West ====
Unlike the land to the east, most of the land west of the Mississippi River was under French or Spanish rule until the first years of the 19th century.

- La Louisiane (French Louisiana, 1682–1762 and 1802–1803)
  - Arkansas Post
  - The German Coast
- Luisiana (Spanish Louisiana, 1762–1802)
- Tejas
  - Fort Saint Louis†
- Santa Fe de Nuevo México
- Las Californias

=== Colonies settled but unrecognized ===
- Transylvania†
- Watauga Republic

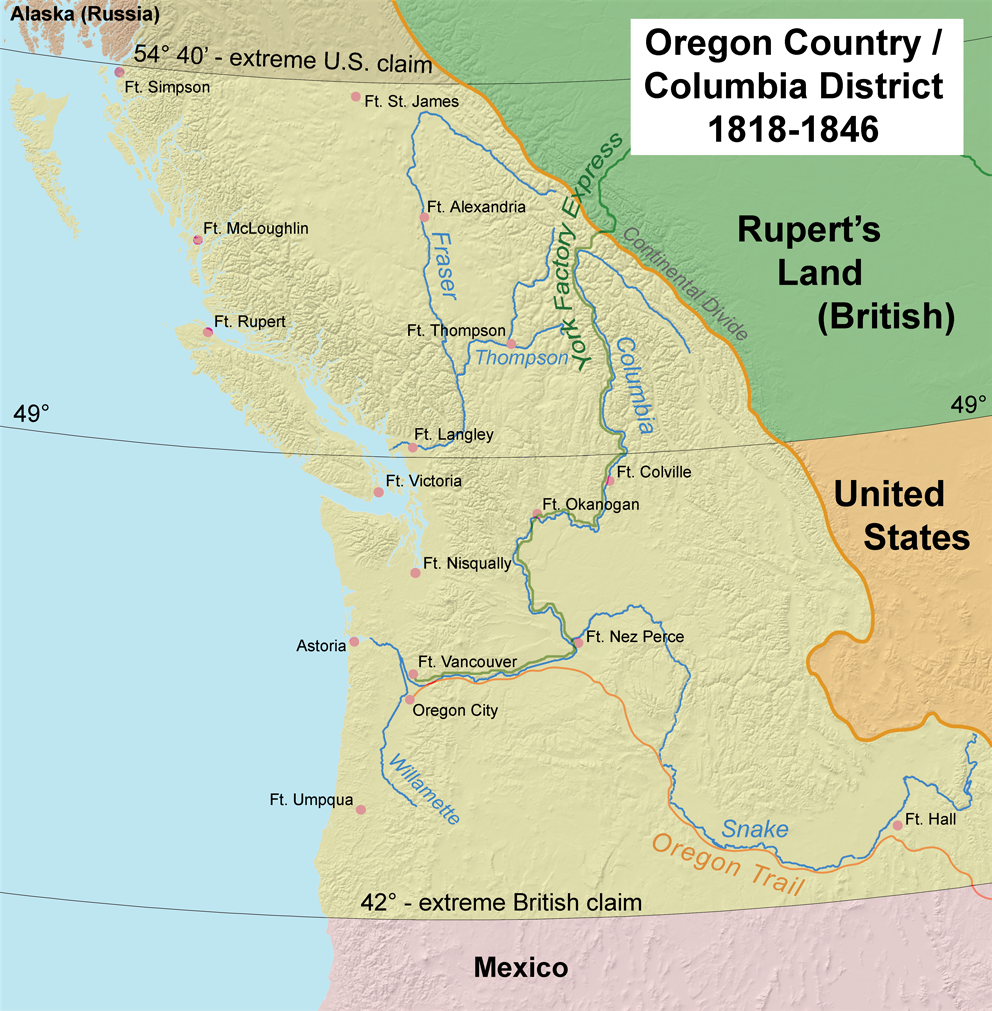
The Oregon Country. The dispute over Oregon, between Britain and the U.S., led to an uneasy, parallel governing of the territory for almost 30 years.

Seward's Folly. The controversial purchase of Alaska from Russia in 1867 turned out to be a great deal for the U.S. when the area proved to contain a treasure trove of natural resources.

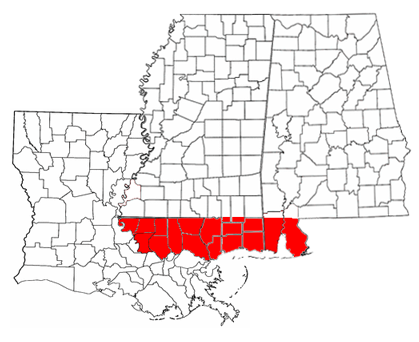
The Baton Rouge and Mobile Districts of Spanish West Florida, claimed by the United States, spanned parts of three later states. The Spanish province also included part of the present-day state of Florida.

=== Colonies proposed but unrealized ===
- Charlotina Colony
- Mississippi Colony
- Vandalia Colony
- Westsylvania

== Independent entities later joined to the Union ==
- Vermont Republic (also known as the Republic of New Connecticut), 1791
- Republic of Texas (disputed with Mexico), 1846
- Republic of Hawaii, 1898 (after U.S. immigrant and military involvement in the overthrow of the Hawaiian Kingdom)

== Regions purchased from foreign powers ==
- Louisiana Purchase, 1803, from France, for $15,000,000
- Florida Purchase (or the Spanish Cession), 1819 (effective 1821), from Spain, for $5,000,000; included: East Florida, West Florida, and Sabine Free State or Neutral Ground
- Gadsden Purchase, 1853, from Mexico, for $10,000,000
- Alaska Purchase (also called "Seward's Folly"), 1867, from Russia, for $7,200,000
- Virgin Islands, 1917, from Denmark, for $25,000,000

== Regions annexed from or ceded by foreign powers ==
- Republic of West Florida Annexation; seceded from Spain, 1810; disputed with Spain until 1821
  - Baton Rouge District (annexed by the U.S., 1810)
  - Mobile District (annexed by the U.S., 1812)
- Pembina Region, formerly part of Rupert's Land and the Red River Colony (often referred to as the British Cession of 1818) to U.S. in an exchange for the unorganized territory of the original Louisiana Purchase lands north of the 49th parallel
- The Aroostook War Compromise Lands; 1842, split jointly claimed areas with the UK
  - Maine–New Brunswick Border
    - Republic of Indian Stream
    - South Acadia
  - Northwest Angle
  - Rupert's Land south of the 49th parallel
- Oregon Country (U.S.); the 1846 Oregon Treaty finally split the jointly governed region (called Columbia by the English) between the U.S. and United Kingdom at the 49th parallel
- Mexican Cession; effective 1848, from Mexico, including:
  - Alta California (California, Nevada, Utah)
  - Nuevo México (New Mexico, Arizona, parts of Texas, Colorado, Oklahoma, Wyoming, Kansas)
    - Provisional New Mexico
- Texas annexation; annexed from Mexico in 1846, including most of present-day Texas and parts of Oklahoma, Colorado, Wyoming and No Man's Land; disputed with Mexico until the end of the Mexican–American War in 1848
  - included old Coahuila y Tejas areas
- United States Minor Outlying Islands; most claimed under the Guano Islands Act as outside the jurisdiction of other nations (1856 and later)
- After victory in the Spanish–American War in 1898, from Spain:
  - The Philippine Islands; became a U.S. Territory (1900–1935) and a U.S. commonwealth (1935–1946)
  - Puerto Rico
  - Guam
- American Samoa; 1899, from Germany
Some historic and current U.S. territories

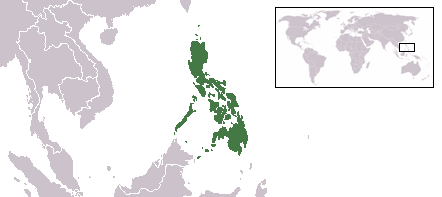
The Philippines was a commonwealth of the United States, 1935–1946

Worldwide location of current U.S. insular areas:

The Commonwealth of Puerto Rico

== Ceded or purchased Native American regions ==
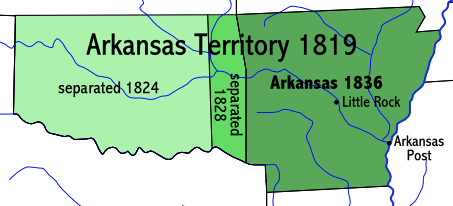
Progression of the two territorial governments, 1819–1836: Indian Territory is in teal; Arkansas is in dark green; western portion of Lovely's Purchase is in light green (to Indian Territory, 1828)

Indiana lands acquired through treaties

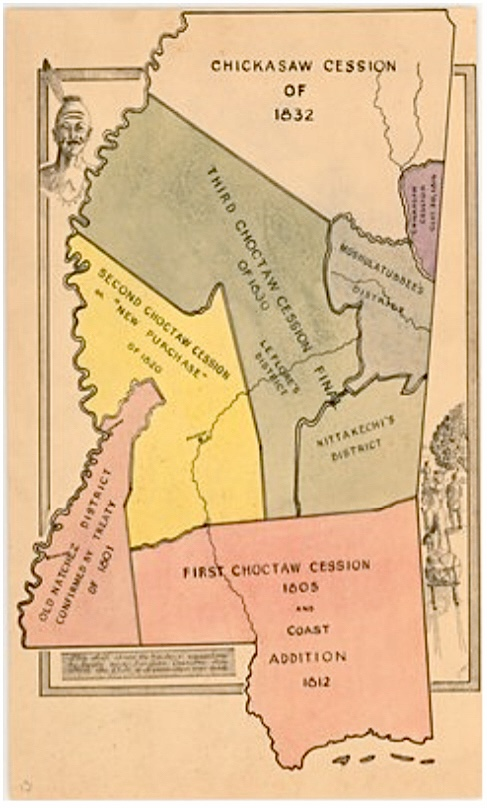
Mississippi indigenous claims and cessions

- Black Hawk Purchase; $640,000; purchased 1832; Michigan Territory (eventually Iowa)
- California Indian Reservations and Cessions; 1851–52; unratified treaties; California
- Cherokee Outlet; $7,000,000; purchased 1893; Oklahoma Territory (eventually Oklahoma)
- Cherokee Strip; a disputed two-mile wide tract of land between the Cherokee Nation and Kansas that was eventually ceded to Kansas in 1866
- Jackson Purchase; $300,000; purchased by Tennessee and Kentucky from the Chickasaw Nation in 1818
- LaFlore's District (Mississippi)
- Lovely's Purchase; 1816 land purchase from the Osage Nation
- Moshulatubee's District (Mississippi/Alabama)
- Nittakechi's District (Mississippi/Alabama)
- Platte Purchase; $7,500; purchased 1836; Missouri
- Saginaw Cession; ceded 1819; Michigan Territory (eventually Michigan)

== Interstate, territorial, and federal cessions ==
The first state cessions. The 13 original states ceded their western claims to the federal government, allowing for the creation of the country's first western territories and states.

The following are state cessions made during the building of the U.S.

- The Delaware Wedge, dispute with Pennsylvania settled in 1921; now a part of the state of Delaware.
- Washington, D.C.; to the federal government from Virginia and Maryland, 1790.
- District of Columbia retrocession; the return to Virginia of the District of Columbia lands which Virginia had originally ceded for its creation, 1847.
- Greer County, Texas; a disputed county claimed both by Texas and the federal government; to Oklahoma Territory, 1896.
- The Honey Lands; a disputed tract of land between the Territory of Iowa and State of Missouri; to State of Iowa, 1851
- District of Kentucky; from Virginia; became the Commonwealth of Kentucky, 1792.
- Illinois County; from Virginia; became Northwest Territory, 1784.
- District of Maine; from Massachusetts; became the state of Maine, 1820.
- The Toledo Strip; the object of the nearly bloodless Toledo War between Ohio and Michigan; to Ohio, 1837.
- Washington District; from North Carolina; became the Southwest Territory, 1790.
- West Virginia; from Virginia; separating itself from the Confederacy, declared 1861; admitted to the Union in 1863.
- The Western Reserve; from Connecticut to the Northwest Territory (Ohio), 1800.
- The Yazoo lands; from Georgia to the Mississippi Territory, 1802.

== Former organized territories ==
What became the Northwest Territory was ceded by Great Britain to the United States at the end of the American Revolutionary War. Britain irrevocably ceded all claims to the territory in the 1814 Treaty of Ghent.

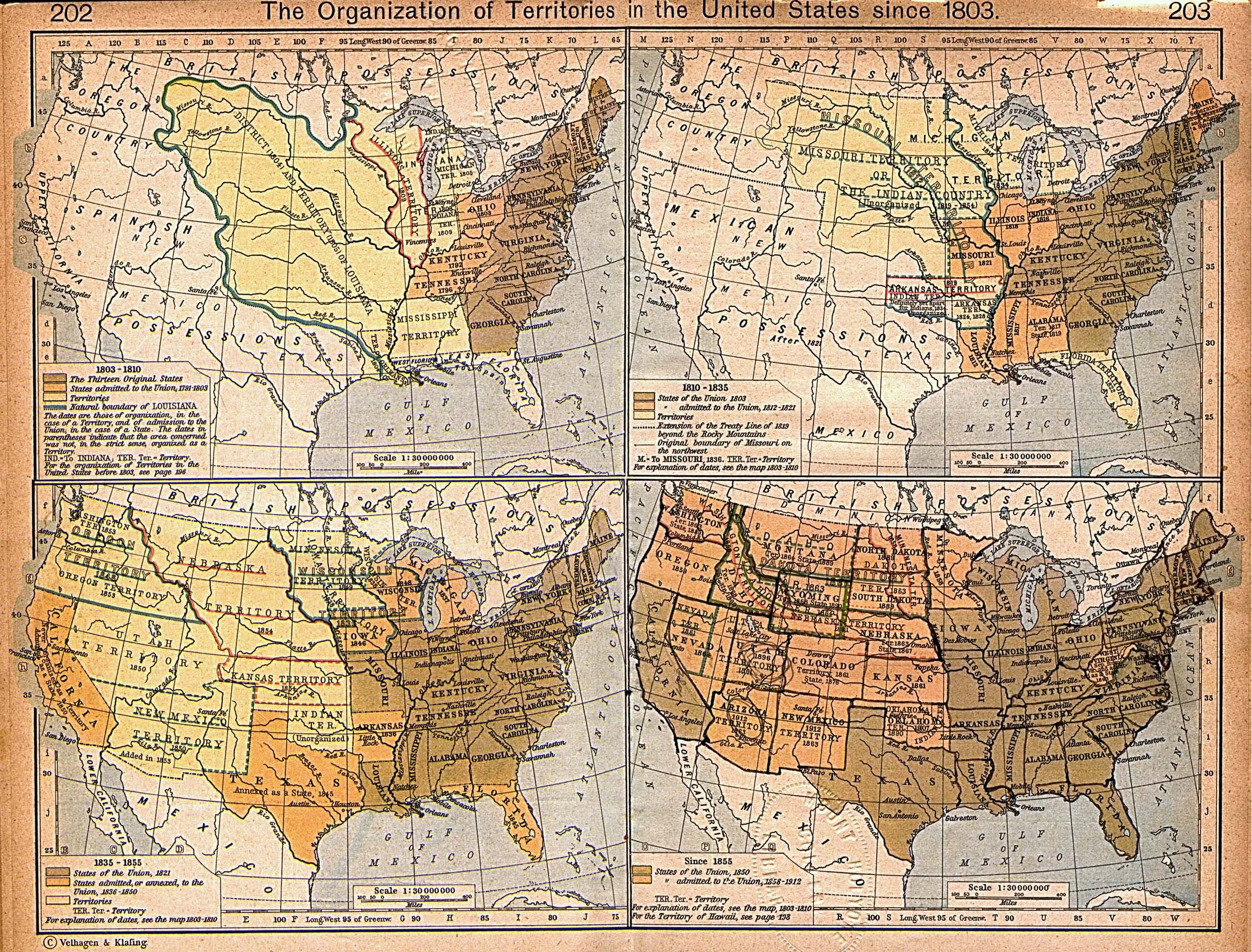
United States territorial expansion since 1803, maps by William R. Shepherd (1923)

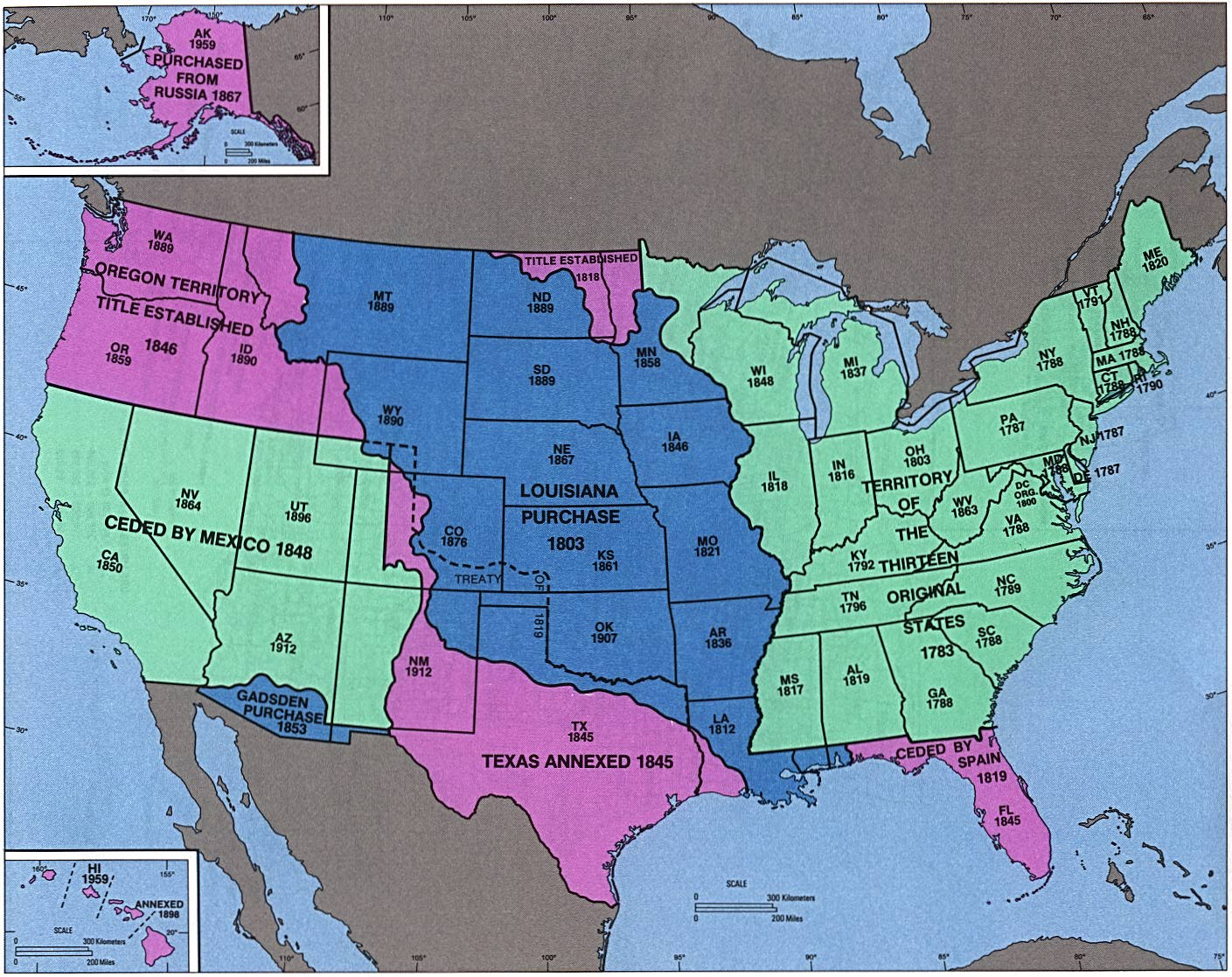
Census Bureau map depicting territorial acquisitions and effective dates of statehood

The following is a list of the 31 U.S. territories that have become states, in the order of the date organized (all were considered incorporated):

- Northwest Territory (1787–1803); became the state of Ohio and the Territory of Indiana
- Territory South of the River Ohio (also known as the Southwest Territory) (1790–1796); became the State of Tennessee
- Territory of Mississippi (1798–1817); became the State of Mississippi and the Territory of Alabama
- Territory of Indiana (1800–1816); split into the Illinois Territory, the Michigan Territory, and the State of Indiana
- Territory of Orleans (1804–1812); became the State of Louisiana.
- Territory of Michigan (1805–1837); became State of Michigan and the Territory of Wisconsin
- Territory of Louisiana (1805–1812) (preceded by the District of Louisiana), then renamed the Territory of Missouri
- Territory of Illinois (1809–1818); split into the State of Illinois and additions to the Michigan Territory
- Territory of Missouri (1812–1821); became the State of Missouri and unorganized territory (the eastern part of which was attached to the Territory of Michigan in 1834)
- Territory of Alabama (1817–1819); became the State of Alabama
- Territory of Arkansas (1819–1836); became the State of Arkansas, additions to the unorganized territory of the original Louisiana Purchase, and the unorganized Indian Territory (which eventually spawned Indian Territory, Oklahoma Territory and No Man's Land)
- Territory of Florida (1822–1845); became the State of Florida
- Territory of Wisconsin (1836–1848); split into the State of Wisconsin, the Iowa Territory and Unorganized Territory
- Territory of Iowa (1838–1846); split into the State of Iowa and unorganized territory of the original Louisiana Purchase
- Territory of Oregon (1848–1859) (preceded by the unrecognized Oregon Country); split into the State of Oregon and Washington Territory
- Territory of Minnesota (1849–1858) (preceded by unorganized territory of the original Northwest Territory (remnant of former Wisconsin Territory) and original Louisiana Purchase); split into the State of Minnesota and unorganized territory of the original Louisiana Purchase
- Territory of New Mexico (1850–1912) (preceded by Nuevo Mexico, of which the southern part was known as the Arizona Territory (1861–1864) by the Confederate States of America); split into the Arizona Territory and the State of New Mexico
- Territory of Utah (1850–1896) (preceded by Alta California and the unrecognized State of Deseret); split into the State of Utah, the Nevada Territory, additions to the Colorado Territory and additions to the Wyoming Territory
- Territory of Washington (1853–1889); became the State of Washington and additions to the Idaho Territory.
- Territory of Kansas (1854–1861) (preceded by unorganized territory of the original Louisiana Purchase); part became the modern State of Kansas; the western part became part of the Colorado Territory
- Territory of Nebraska (1854–1867) (preceded by unorganized territory of the original Louisiana Purchase); split into the State of Nebraska, the Dakota Territory, additions to the Idaho Territory and additions to the Colorado Territory
- Territory of Colorado (1861–1876) (preceded by parts of the territories of Kansas, Utah, New Mexico and Nebraska); became the State of Colorado (see also Jefferson Territory)
- Territory of Nevada (1861–1864) (preceded by the Utah Territory and the unrecognized State of Deseret); became the State of Nevada.
- Territory of Dakota (1861–1889); became the State of North Dakota, the State of South Dakota, additions to the Idaho Territory and additions to the Wyoming Territory.
- Territory of Arizona (1863–1912); became the State of Arizona and an addition to the State of Nevada.
- Territory of Idaho (1863–1890) (preceded by parts of the territories of Washington, Dakota, and Nebraska); became the State of Idaho, the Montana Territory, additions to the Dakota Territory and additions to the Wyoming Territory.
- Territory of Montana (1864–1889); became the State of Montana.
- Territory of Wyoming (1868–1890) (preceded by parts of the territories of Dakota, Utah and Idaho); became the State of Wyoming.
- Territory of Oklahoma (1890–1907) (preceded by the unorganized Indian Territory (1834–1907) and the Neutral Strip); became the State of Oklahoma.
- Territory of Hawaii (1900–1959) (preceded by the Republic of Hawaii); became the State of Hawaii.
- Territory of Alaska (1912–1959) (preceded by the Department of Alaska and the District of Alaska); became the State of Alaska.

== Internal land grants, cessions, districts, departments, claims and settlements ==
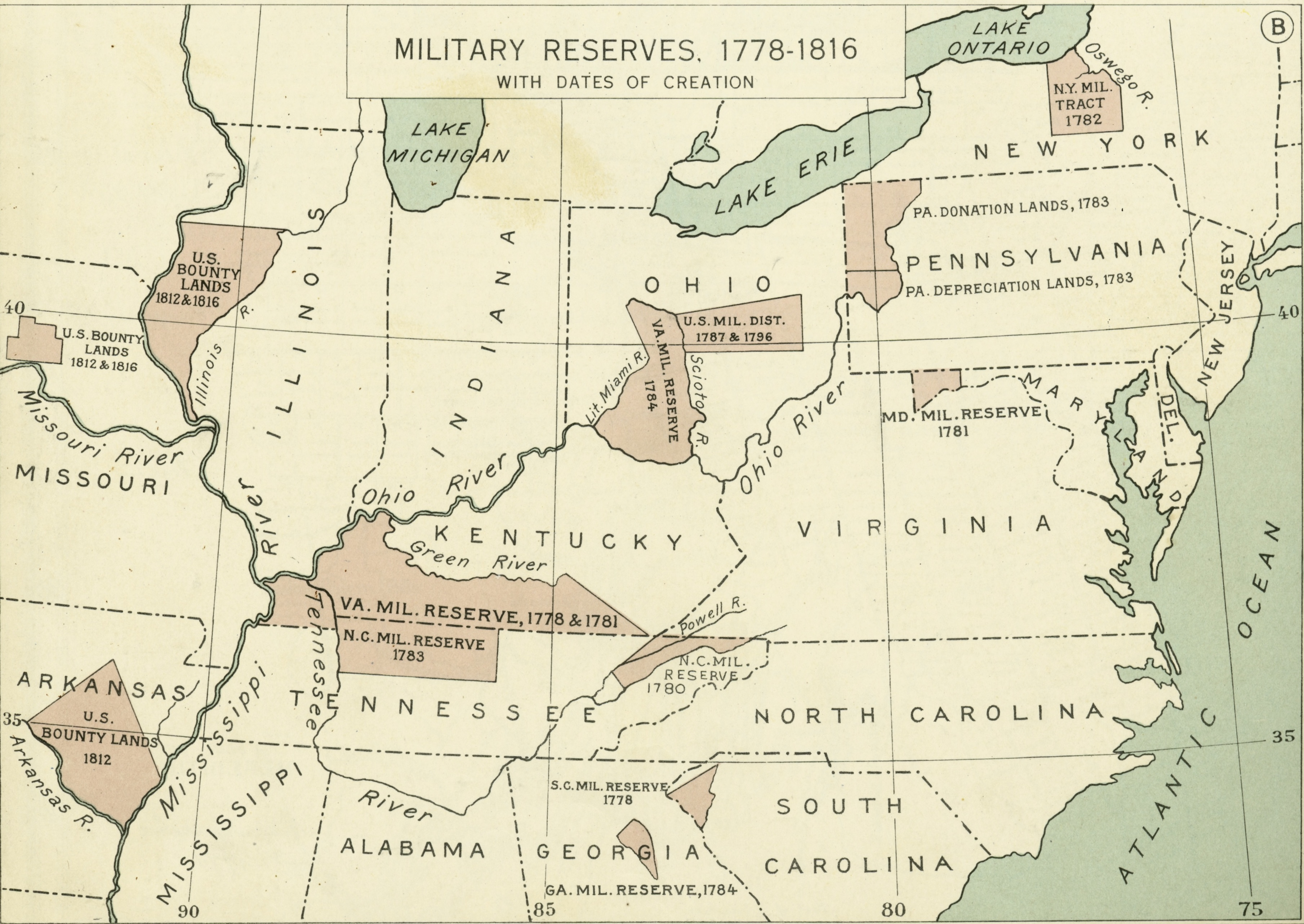
Map of Military Reserves in the United States, 1778–1816, with Dates of Creation

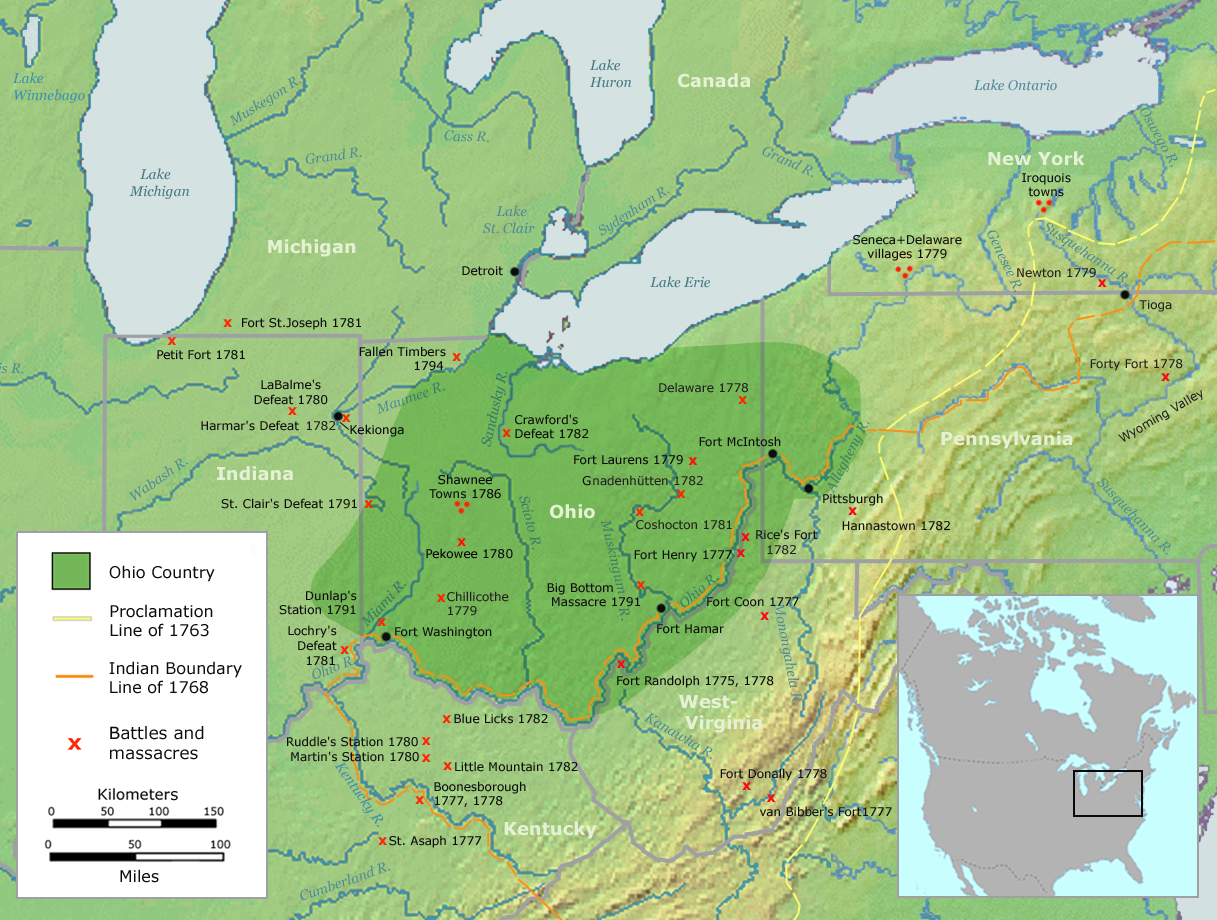
The Ohio Country, indicating battle sites between settlers and Native American Tribes, 1775–1794

The following are land grants, cessions, defined districts (official or otherwise) or named settlements made within an area that was already part of a U.S. state or territory that did not involve international treaties or Native American cessions or land purchases.

- Cumberland District, North Carolina (also called the District of Miro); Tennessee.
- District of Louisiana; Missouri, Kansas, Iowa, Nebraska, Minnesota, North and South Dakota, Montana, Arkansas, Oklahoma, Colorado, Wyoming; renamed Missouri Territory in 1812.
- Military Tract of 1812; Illinois, Michigan, Arkansas, Missouri.
- Ohio Country; parts of Ohio, Indiana, Pennsylvania, West Virginia.

=== Alaska ===
- District of Alaska; renamed the Alaska Territory in 1912.

=== Colorado ===
- Pike's Peak Country

=== Iowa ===
- Half-Breed Tract
- Keokuk's Reserve

=== Nebraska ===
- Nemaha Half-Breed Reservation

=== New York ===
Selected tract purchases of western New York State

- Central New York Military Tract
- The Holland Purchase
- Macomb's Purchase
- Mill Yard Tract
- The Morris Reserve
- Phelps and Gorham Purchase
- The Triangle Tract

=== Ohio ===
Map of the Ohio Lands

- Canal Lands
- College Lands
- College Township
- Congress Lands (or Congressional Lands, 1798–1821)
  - Congress Lands North of Old Seven Ranges
  - Congress Lands West of Miami River
  - Congress Lands East of Scioto River
  - North and East of First Principal Meridian
  - South and East of the First Principal Meridian
- Dohrman Tract
- Ephraim Kimberly Grant
- Firelands or Sufferers' Lands
- French Grant
- Indian Land Grants
- Maumee Road Lands
- Michigan meridian (or Michigan Meridian Survey; also Toledo Tract)
- Miami & Erie Canal Lands
- Ministerial Lands
- Moravian Indian Grants
  - Gnadenhutten Tract
  - Salem Tract
  - Schoenbrunn Tract
- Ohio & Erie Canal Lands
- The Ohio Company
  - Donation Tract
  - First Purchase
  - Purchase on the Muskingum (or Second Purchase)
- Refugee Tract
- Salt Reservations (or Salt Lands)
- School Lands
- Seven Ranges (or Old Seven Ranges)
- Symmes Purchase (or Miami Purchase; also the Land Between the Miamis)
- Turnpike Lands
- Twelve Mile Square Reservation
- Two Mile Square Reservation
- United States Military District
- Virginia Military District
- Zane's Tracts (or Zane's Grant; also Ebenezer Zane Tract)

=== Oklahoma ===
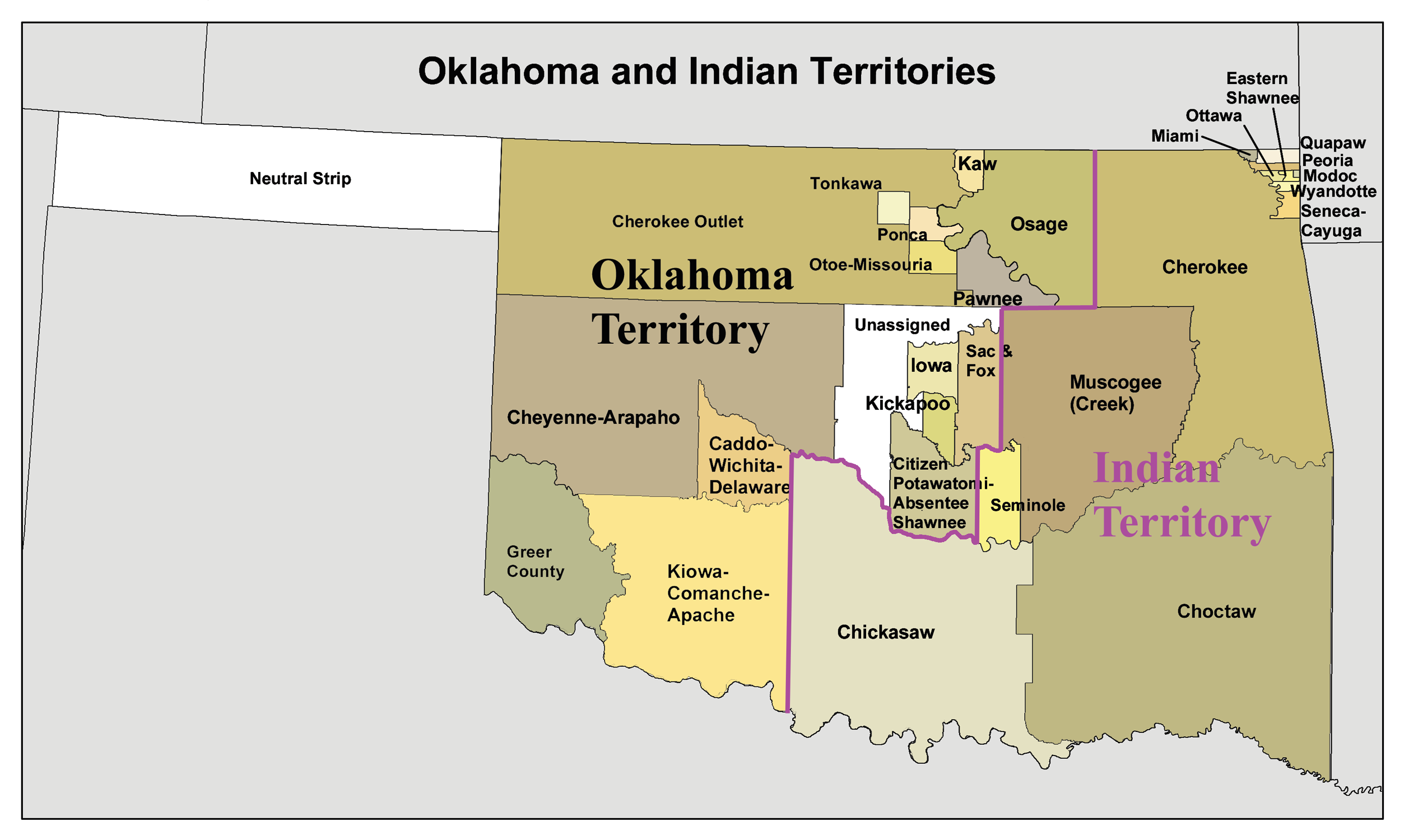
Oklahoma Territory and Indian Territory, along with No Man's Land (also known as the Oklahoma Panhandle). The division of the two territories is shown with a heavy purple line. Together, these three areas would become the State of Oklahoma in 1907.

- Big Pasture
- Indian Territory or The Oklahoma Indian Country
- Neutral Strip (or No Man's Land)
- Unassigned Lands

==== Indian reserves ====
- The original and current Cherokee Nation
- Cheyenne–Arapaho Reserve
- Chickasaw Reserve
- Choctaw Reserve
- Comanche, Kiowa and Apache Reserve
- Creek Reserve
- Iowa Reserve
- Kaw Reserve
- Kickapoo Reserve
- Osage Reserve
- Ponca and Otoe–Missouria Reserve
- Citizen Potawatomi and Absentee Shawnee Reserve
- Sac and Fox Reserve
- Seminole Reserve
- Tonkawa Reserve
- Wichita and Caddo Reserve

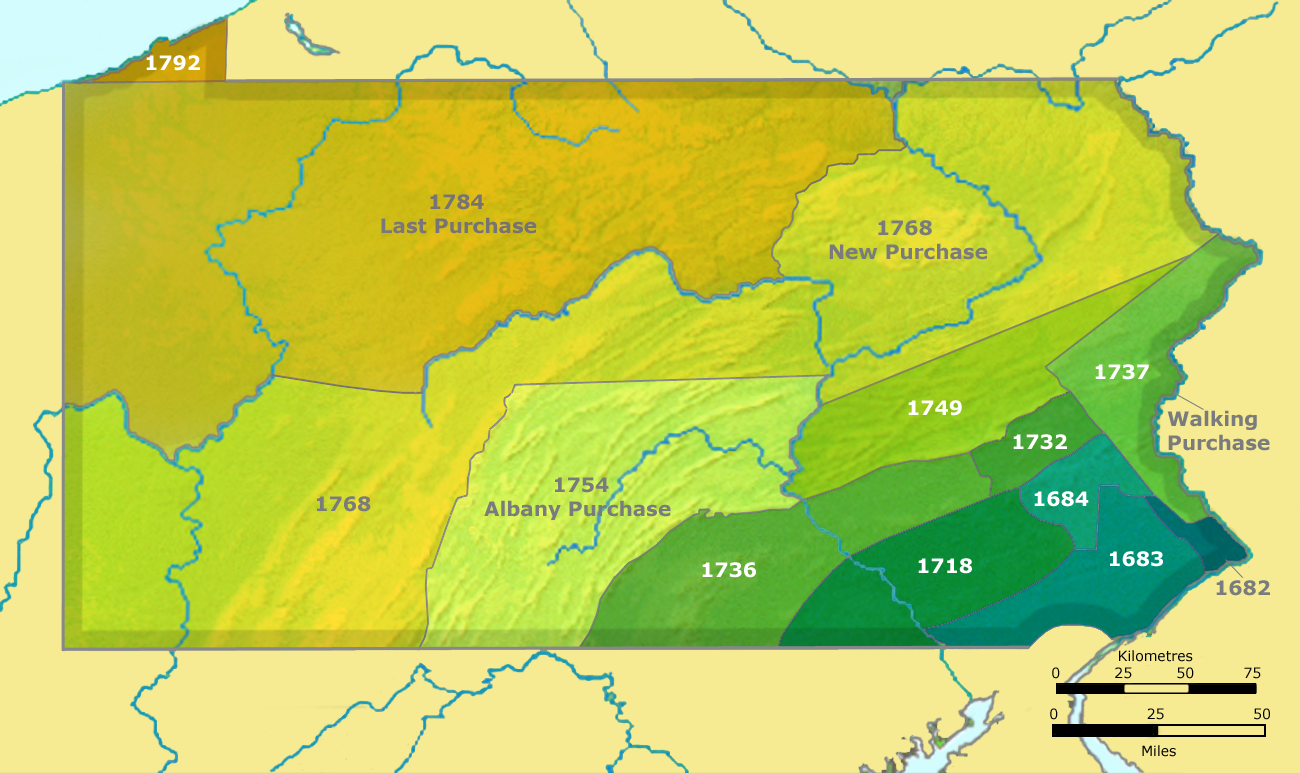
Pennsylvania land purchases from Native Americans

=== Pennsylvania ===
- Erie Triangle
- New Purchase
- Walking Purchase
- Welsh Tract

=== Tennessee ===
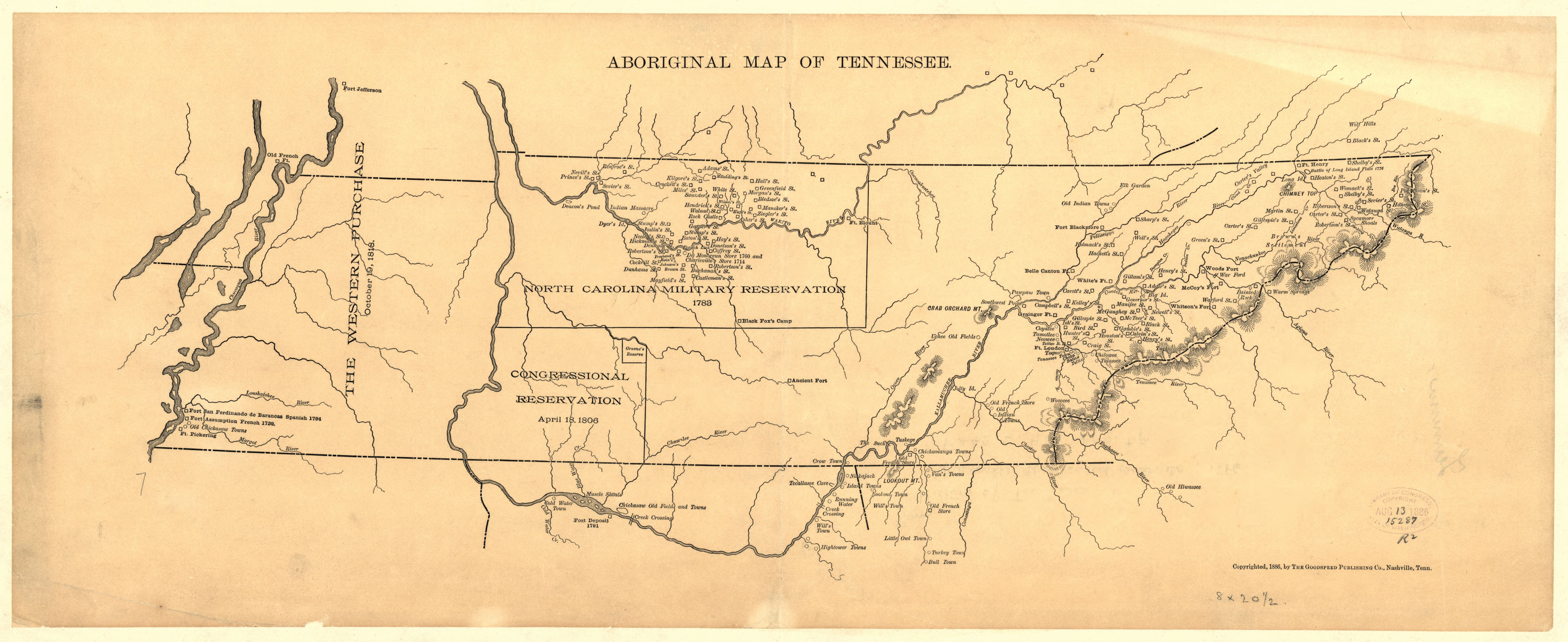
"Aboriginal map of Tennessee" (1886)

- Congressional Reservation
- Greene's Reserve
- North Carolina Military Reservation
- Western Purchase

== Federal military districts and departments ==
These entities were sometimes the only governmental authority in the listed areas, although they often co-existed with civil governments in scarcely populated states and territories. Civilian administered "military" tracts, districts, departments, etc., will be listed elsewhere.

=== Central United States ===
- Department of the Northwest (1862–1865) Dakota, Minnesota, Montana, Wisconsin, Iowa, Nebraska
  - District of Minnesota (1862–1865)
  - District of Wisconsin (1862–1865)
  - District of Iowa (1862–1865)
  - District of Dakota (1862–1866)
  - District of Montana (1864–1866)
- Department of the Missouri (1861–1865) Missouri, Arkansas, Illinois, part of Kentucky, and later Kansas; re-configured in 1865 as part of the Division of the Missouri.
- Division of the Missouri (1865–1891).
  - Department of Dakota (1866–1911) Minnesota, Montana, North Dakota, and parts of Idaho, South Dakota and the Yellowstone portion of Wyoming.
  - Department of the Missouri (1865–1891) Arkansas, Kansas, Missouri, Indian Territory, and Territory of Oklahoma.
  - Department of the Platte (1866–1898) Iowa, Nebraska, Colorado, Dakota Territory, Utah Territory, Wyoming (except Yellowstone), and a portion of Idaho.
  - Department of Texas (1871–1880) (originally part of the Department of the Gulf) Texas after 1865.
- Department of New Mexico (1854–65) New Mexico Territory; previously part of the District of California and the Department of the West.

=== Pacific area ===
- Pacific Division (1848–1853) lands won in the Mexican–American War; became the original Department of the Pacific in 1853.
  - Military Department 10 (1848–1851) California.
  - Military Department 11 (1848–1851) Oregon Territory.
- Department of the Pacific (1853–1858; and 1861–1865); separated into the Department of California and the Department of Oregon in 1858.
  - District of Oregon (1853–1858) Washington Territory, Oregon Territory.
  - District of California (1853–1858) California, New Mexico Territory; Utah added 1858

During the American Civil War, the Department of the Pacific had six subordinate military districts:

- District of Oregon (headquarters at Fort Vancouver) January 15, 1861 – July 27, 1865
- District of California (headquarters at San Francisco, co-located with Department of the Pacific). Independent command from Department from (July 1, 1864 – July 27, 1865); those parts of California not in other districts.
- District of Southern California (September 25, 1861 – July 27, 1865); Counties of Southern California (southward from San Luis Obispo and Tulare Counties).
- District of Humboldt (December 12, 1861 – July 27, 1865); Del Norte, Humboldt, Klamath, Mendocino Counties of California.
- District of Utah (August 6, 1862 – July 27, 1865); Utah Territory, Nevada Territory, later State of Nevada.
- District of Arizona (March 7, 1865 – July 27, 1865); Territory of Arizona

The Department of California (1858–1861) comprised the southern part of the Department of the Pacific: California, Nevada, and southern part of Oregon Territory; merged into the Department of the Pacific as the District of California.

The Department of Oregon (1858–1861) comprised the northern part of the Department of the Pacific: Washington Territory and Oregon Territory.

- Military Division of the Pacific (1865–1891).
  - Department of Alaska (1868–1884) became the civilian-ruled District of Alaska.
  - Department of Arizona (1865–1891) Arizona Territory; included New Mexico Territory after 1885.
  - Department of the Columbia (1865–1891) Oregon, Washington Territory, part of Idaho Territory, and Alaska after 1870.
    - District of Oregon (1865–1867) Washington Territory, Oregon Territory and Idaho Territory.
  - New Department of California (1865–1891) California, Nevada Territory, Arizona Territory, and part of New Mexico Territory.

Post-Civil War military districts were set up to aid in the repatriation process of the southern states during Reconstruction.

=== The south ===
- Department of the Gulf (1862–1865; created by the U.S. for the Civil War) Mississippi, Alabama, Louisiana, and Texas.
- Trans-Mississippi (or Trans-Mississippi Department; CSA) (1862–1865). Formerly "Military Dept. 2"; Missouri, Arkansas, Texas, Indian Territory (now Oklahoma), Kansas, and Louisiana west of the Mississippi River.

=== The west ===
- Department of the West (1853–1861): all U.S. lands between the Mississippi River and the Military District of the Pacific not included in other Districts or Departments.

== Retroceded possessions and overseas territories ==
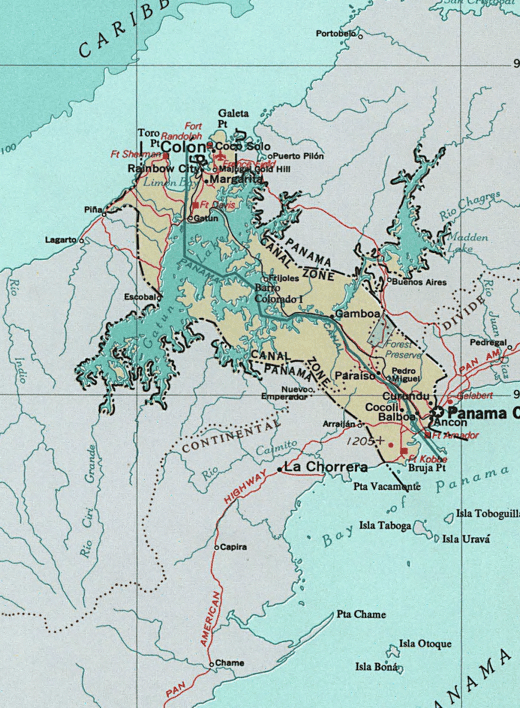
The Panama Canal Zone was once a territory of the United States

- The Milk River and Poplar River cessions to the United Kingdom (Treaty of 1818)
- Commonwealth of the Philippines to Republic of the Philippines (1946)
- Chamizal, Texas, to Mexico (1964)
- Swan Islands to Honduras (1971)
- Rio Rico, Texas, (Horcón Tract) to Mexico (1977)
- Panama Canal Zone to Panama (1979)
- Canton and Enderbury Islands (administered jointly with the UK) to Kiribati (1979)

== Functioning but non-sanctioned territories ==
The boundaries of the State of Deseret, as proposed in 1849

These "territories" had actual, functioning governments (recognized or not):

- Cimarron Territory
- State of Deseret
- State of Frankland / Franklin
- Jefferson Territory
- Kansas Territory (1854–1861) had two different governments in different cities, pro-slavery and anti-slavery, each claiming to be the real, lawful government of the entire territory. Since Kansas entered the union as a free state in 1861, there has only been one capital, Topeka, Kansas. It entered as a free state in 1861 because the entire pro-slavery block in Congress, which would not have allowed this, had left to become the Confederacy.
- Long Republic
- Nataqua Territory
- Trans-Oconee Republic

=== Civil War-related ===
Animated map of secession and repatriation of the Confederacy, 1860–1870

These are functioning governments created as a result of the attempted secession of the Confederacy during the American Civil War (1861–1865). Some were enclaves within enemy-held territories:

- Confederate States of America (CSA) – see map.
  - Confederate Arizona (parts of the territories of Arizona and New Mexico)
  - State of Dade
  - Second Republic of South Carolina

These were regions disassociated from neighboring areas due to opposing views:

- Nickajack
- Free State of Jones
- Republic of Winston (see Winston County, Alabama)
- State of Scott, seceded from Tennessee and became a Union enclave (see Scott County, Tennessee)
- Town Line, New York
- Free State of Van Zandt, seceded from Texas to be its own republic.

== Regional nicknames ==
Regions of the United States: New England Mid-Atlantic East North Central (Great Lakes, or Eastern Midwest) West North Central (Western Midwest, or The Great Plains States) South Atlantic East South Central West South Central Mountain States Pacific States

- Eastern United States
  - The East Coast
  - The Northeast
    - New England
    - Mid-Atlantic States
      - The Burnt-Over District
  - South Atlantic States
  - Appalachia
  - East North Central States
- The South
  - Border States
  - The Deep South
  - Dixie
- The Midwest
  - The Great Plains
    - The Dust Bowl
- The West
  - Mountain States
    - The Rockies
    - Inland Empire (Washington and Idaho)
    - Great Basin
  - The Southwest
    - The Four Corners
  - The West Coast
    - The Pacific Northwest

=== Belts ===
Belts are loosely defined sub-regions found throughout the United States that are named for a perceived commonality among the included areas, which is often related to the region's economy or climate.

- Bible Belt
- Black Belt
- Borscht Belt
- Breadbasket of the United States
- Cotton Belt
- Corn Belt or Grain Belt
- Mormon Corridor or "Jello Belt"
- Lead Belt
- Rust Belt
- Snow Belt
- Sun Belt
- Tornado Alley

== See also ==
- European colonization of the Americas
- List of former United States counties
- List of regions of the United States
- Political divisions of the United States
- Proposed states and territories of the United States
- Territorial evolution of the United States
- Territories of the United States on stamps
- United States territorial acquisitions
- Indian Land Cessions in the United States (1898)
- American Colonization Society
