= Federal Land Office (Steubenville, Ohio) =

- U.S. National Register of Historic Places
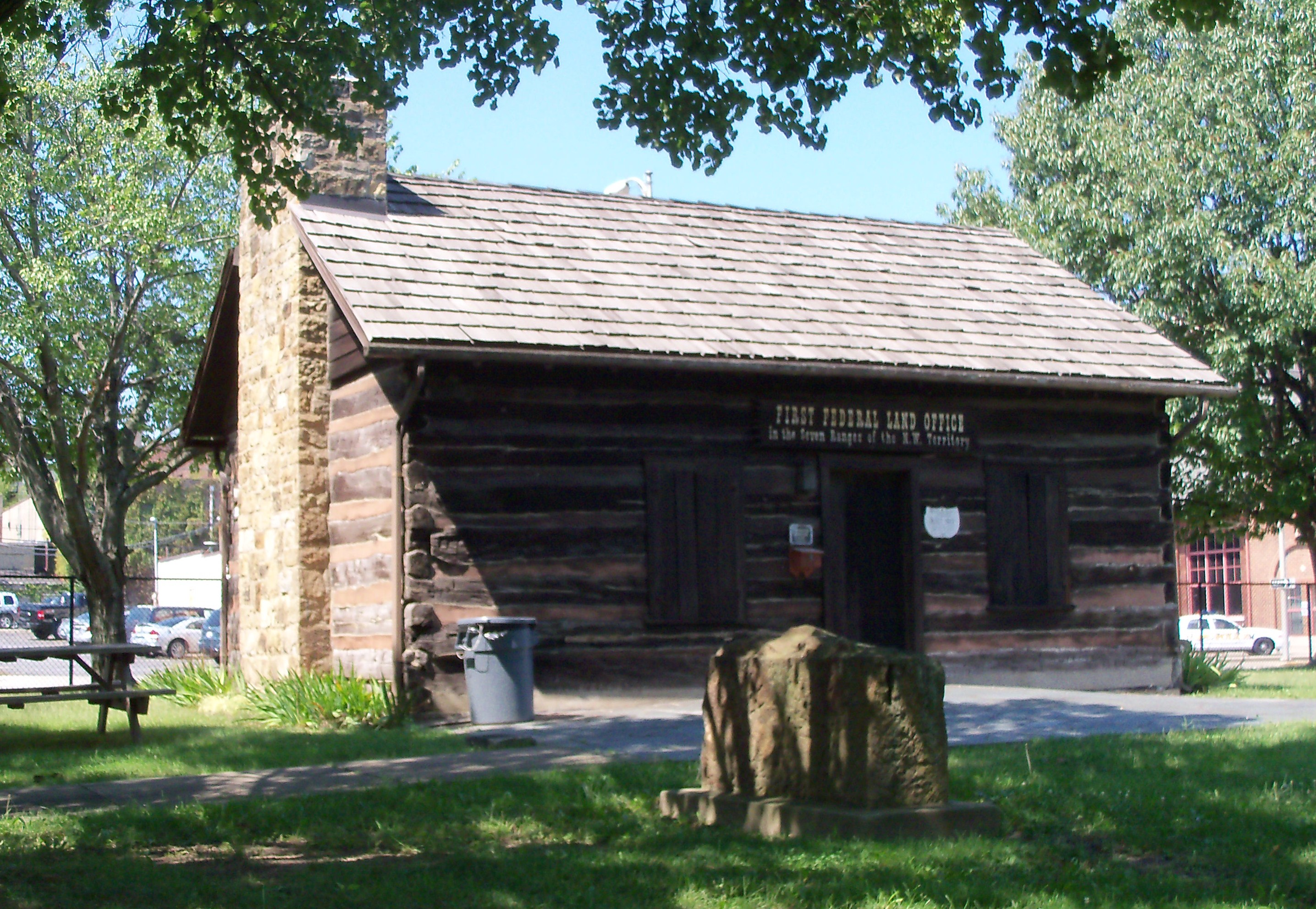
- Federal Land Office

- Location within Ohio Location within the United States
- Nearest city: Steubenville, Ohio
- Coordinates: 40°21′29″N 80°36′51″W
- Area: 0.5 acres (0.20 ha)
- Built: 1801
- Architectural style: Log Cabin
- NRHP reference No.: 73001482
- Added to NRHP: April 3, 1973

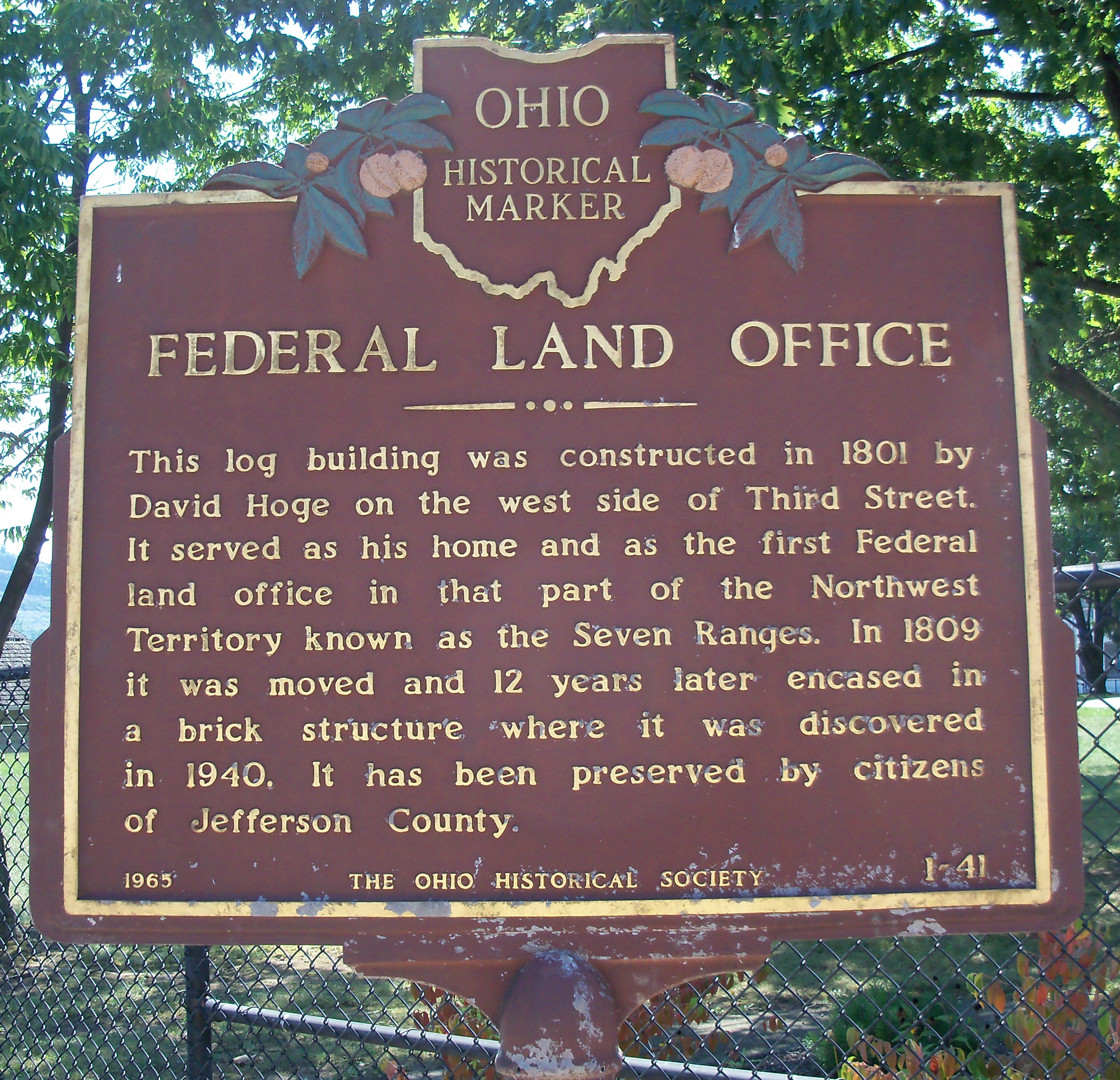

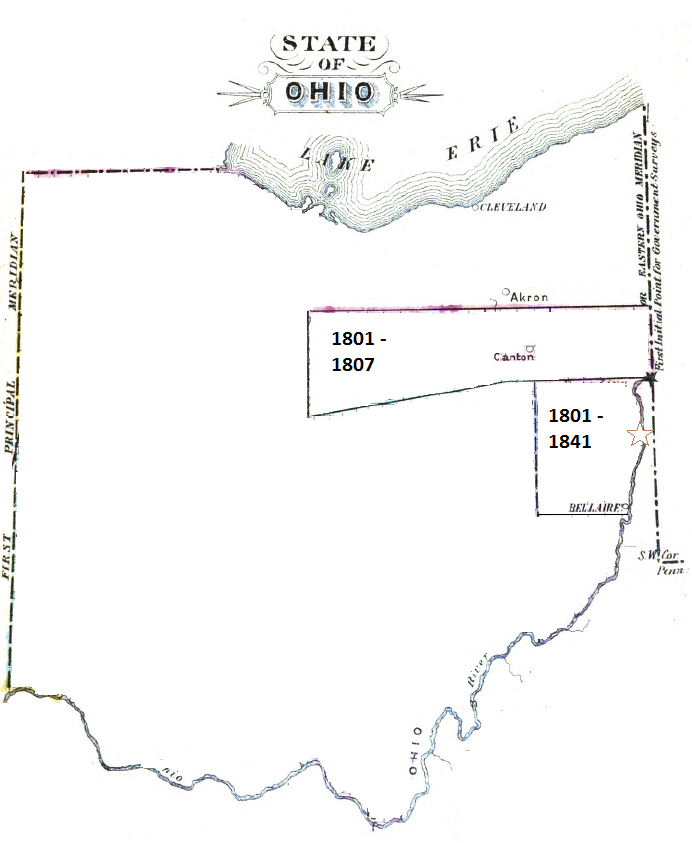
The Steubenville Land District shrank in 1807. Star locates Land Office.

Federal Land Office is a former government building in Steubenville, Ohio where the federal government sold public lands to settlers. It is now on the property of a museum beside reconstructed Fort Steuben. In 1973, while on another site about a mile away, 40°22′31″N 80°36′47″W, it was added to the National Register of Historic Places for its historical significance. It was later moved to its present location.

== History ==
In 1800, Congress passed the Harrison Land Act, titled An Act to amend an act entitled "An act providing for the sale of the lands of the United States, in the territory northwest of the Ohio, and above the mouth of the Kentucky River". Section 1 established four land offices in Cincinnati, Ohio, Chillicothe, Ohio, Marietta, Ohio, and Steubenville, Ohio. The Steubenville office was responsible for the Steubenville Land District, lands in the northernmost 48 miles of the Seven Ranges, and in the Congress Lands North of Old Seven Ranges. Each office was under the direction of an officer called "Register of the Land Office", appointed by the President with consent and approval of the Senate. Section 4 directed sales to begin at Steubenville in 1801. Section 6 created the position "receiver of public monies" at each office. The act allowed payment for land to be spread over several years, and it was the duty of the officers to keep meticulous records of buyers, property location, and payments, and issue patents when paid in full.

President Adams named David Hoge as Register. He purchased a plot of land on the west side of Third Street from Bezaleel Wells, founder of Steubenville, and built a two-story log cabin as home and office. In 1809, it was moved and 12 years later encased in a brick structure, where it was discovered in 1940, and preserved by citizens of Jefferson County, Ohio.

The Act of March 3, 1807 established a land office for the Congress Lands North of Old Seven Ranges that ended up in Canton, creating the Canton Land District. This reduced the size of the Steubenville Land District.

David Hoge served as Register from 1801 to 1841. Receivers, in chronological order, were Zaccheus Biggs, Obadiah Jennings, Peter Wilson, Gen. Samuel Stokely, and John Viers. The office was closed by the Act of June 12, 1840. In the nineteenth century, several hundred Federal Land Offices were established in the Public Lands states.

== See also ==
- Ohio Company Land Office
