= Register (General Land Office) =

U.S. government official

A register (formally, "Register of the Land Office") was the top official for a district land office of the United States General Land Office. Registers were nominated by the president, with approval of the senate.

For most of the active period of public lands settlement in the United States, district land offices were the basic operating units that conducted the business of transferring title. All transactions relative to the disposal of public land within a declared land district were handled through its land office by officials designated as registers, who recorded land applications, and receivers ("Receivers of Public Monies"), who accepted payments for land and issued receipts. The position of receiver was abolished, July 1, 1925, and the functions devolved upon the register, whose title was changed to "manager" in 1946.

The first of 362 land offices was opened at Steubenville, Ohio, on July 2, 1800; the last at Newcastle, Wyoming, on March 1, 1920. The peak year for land offices was 1890, with 123 in operation. The subsequent closing of the public domain gradually reduced the number of land offices, until, in 1933, only 25 offices remained. These functions were gradually merged into other operations of the Bureau of Land Management.
