= Dohrman Tract =

Dohrman Tract or Dohrman’s Grant was a land tract in eastern Ohio granted by Congress to Arnold Henry Dohrman (1749–1813), who helped the American cause in the Revolutionary War.

== Biography ==
At the beginning of the war, Dohrman, of the Netherlands, was a wealthy merchant in Lisbon, Portugal. He supplied the United States with clothing and war material, and fed and looked after American seamen who the British had captured and released to his custody. In June, 1780, the Committee on Foreign Affairs in Congress reported to that body on his humane acts. A resolution was passed appointing him agent for the United States in the Kingdom of Portugal, an unpaid position. They authorized him to extend relief to US citizens, and to bill them for his expenditures. They assured they would refund him at their earliest opportunity.

Dohrman presented a bill on July 19, 1786 for $26,084.24. He only had vouchers proving $5,806.80 in expenses. Congress paid the smaller amount on October 1, 1787. The $20,277.44 shortfall was not paid, but Congress paid him a salary of $1600 per year from the time he started his assistance, and allowed him to make a choice of any township of land out of the fifth through seventh ranges of the first seven ranges surveyed in Ohio.

Dohrman had not seen Ohio, and acted on the advice of others when he chose the thirteenth township of the seventh range, now half in Harrison County and half in Tuscarawas County. President John Adams issued a patent for the land to Dohrman, or his legal representatives, on February 27, 1801.

Dohrman lived in New York City for many years, engaging in business. Various misfortunes lead to him having to mortgage his land to his creditors, preventing him from subdividing and selling at a profit. After his business failure, he moved to Steubenville, Ohio to be nearer his land. He died there in 1813. In 1817, Congress granted his widow, Rachel Dohrman, an annuity of $400 per year and $100 per year for each of his children until age 21.

== The Grant in Modern Times ==
The grant consists of the a three-mile (5 km) wide by 1 ½ mile high parcel in the southwest corner of Monroe Township, Harrison County, Ohio, a three-mile (5 km) wide by 4 ½ mile high western half of Franklin Township, Harrison County, Ohio, a three-mile (5 km) wide by four mile high strip on the east side of Mill Township, Tuscarawas County, Ohio, and a three-mile (5 km) wide by two mile high strip on the east side of Rush Township, Tuscarawas County, Ohio for a total of approximately 36 square miles (93 km^{2}). The corners of the grant are at 40°23′24″N 81°19′49″W, 40°18′16″N 81°20′05″W,40°23′17″N 81°12′51″W, 40°18′07″N 81°13′05″W. The community of Stillwater and the dam and part of the reservoir of Tappan Lake are in the tract and Ohio State Route 800 and United States Highway 250 pass through.

== See also ==
- Ohio Lands
- Historic regions of the United States
