= Seven Ranges =

Land tract in eastern Ohio, US

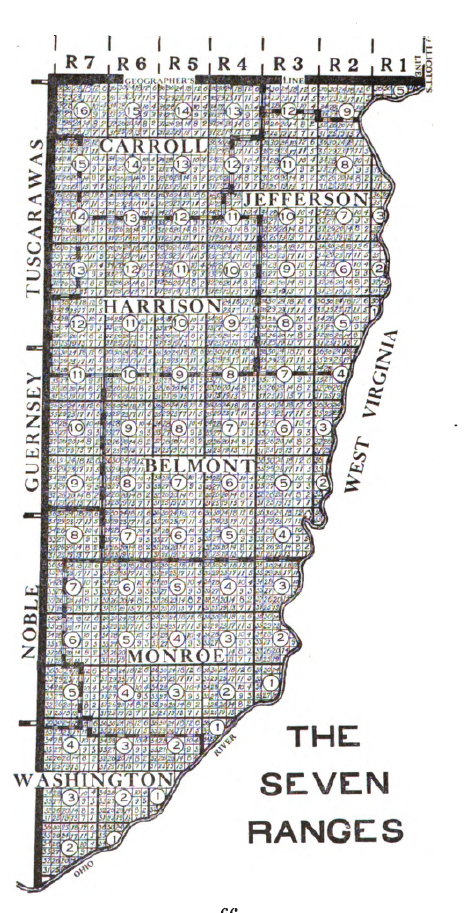
The Seven Ranges

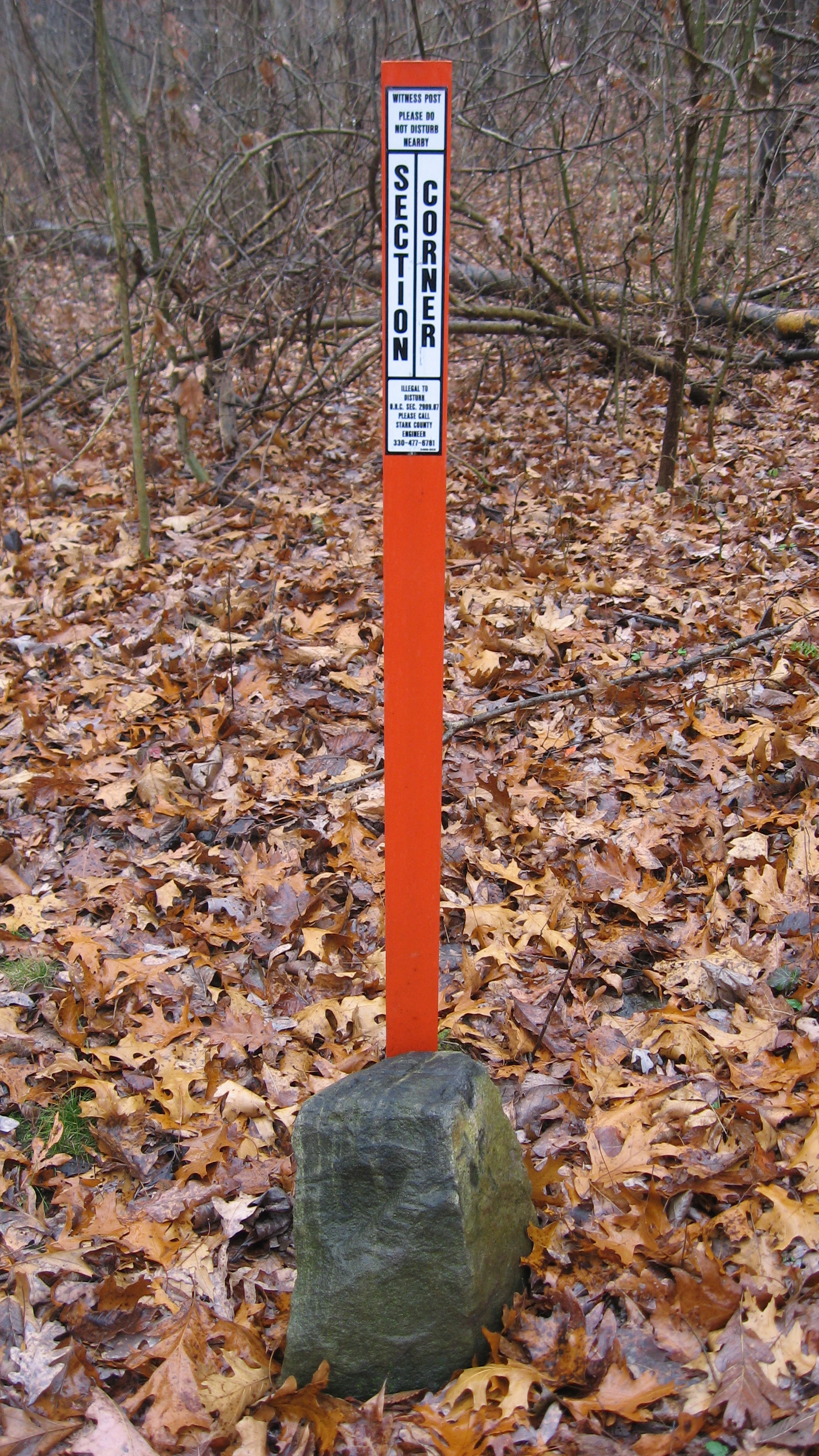
The Seven Ranges Terminus

The Seven Ranges (also known as the Old Seven Ranges) was a land tract in eastern Ohio that was the first tract to be surveyed, the Seven Ranges survey, in what became the Public Land Survey System. The tract is 42 miles (68 km) across the northern edge, 91 miles (146 km) on the western edge, with the south and east sides along the Ohio River.

It consists of all of Monroe, Harrison, Belmont and Jefferson, and portions of Carroll, Columbiana, Tuscarawas, Guernsey, Noble, and Washington County.

== History ==
Acquired by Great Britain from France following the 1763 Treaty of Paris, the Ohio Country had been closed to settlement by the Proclamation of 1763. The United States claimed the region after the 1783 Treaty of Paris that ended the American Revolutionary War. In spite of the prohibition on settlement, a number of squatters moved into the land north of the Ohio River making settlements in Tiltonsville, Martins Ferry and other places, who were removed by force by the federal government. The Congress passed the Land Ordinance of 1785 as a formal means of surveying, selling, and settling the land and raising revenue. Land was to be systematically surveyed into square "townships", six miles (9.656 km) on a side created by lines running north-south intersected by east-west lines. Townships were to be arranged in north-south rows called ranges. These townships were sub-divided into thirty-six "sections" of one square mile (2.59 km^{2}) or 640 acres. These ranges, townships, and sections were to be systematically numbered.

The first north-south line, Eastern Ohio Meridian, was to be the western boundary of Pennsylvania, sometimes called Ellicott's Line after Andrew Ellicott, who had been in charge of surveying it. The first east-west line (called the Geographer's Line or baseline) was to begin where the Pennsylvania boundary touched the north bank of the Ohio River, the Beginning Point of the U.S. Public Land Survey 40°38′33″N 80°31′10″W.

=== Seven Ranges survey ===
The survey of the Seven Ranges began in August 1785 and was completed in June of 1787. The Geographer's Line was originally to extend westward through "the whole territory" which at that time was meant to include lands lying between the Ohio River and Lake Erie. However, after slow progress in 1785, when only four miles of the Geographer's Line had been surveyed by October, Congress specified in 1786 that the line should be run for "only seven squares, or ranges—a distance of just forty-two miles—and disregarding the land to the north of it, to concentrate on surveying southward to a bend in the Ohio River." Congress was anxious to sell land of the "Northwest Territory" to acquire a means to fund the fledgling Confederation government.

The Land Ordinance of 1785 was promulgated as a method for surveying, selling and settling these lands. The ordinance established a method for surveying the land into a grid of six mile square survey townships. These townships were to be arranged into vertical rows called “Ranges”. The first ranges were to be measured from a meridian along the western boundary of Pennsylvania. The townships in each range were measured from an east-west line called a baseline. This became the genesis of the techniques used in the Public Land Survey System.

The 1785 ordinance called for the Geographer of the United States, Thomas Hutchins, to personally supervise the first survey. It called for Hutchins to establish a Point of Beginning on the north bank of the Ohio River where it leaves Pennsylvania. From there he was to establish a baseline seven ranges wide, (42 miles), called the “Geographer’s Line”, and then survey north-south lines each six miles to mark the edges of the ranges, and then establish the south boundary of each township. After each seven ranges had been completed, the Geographer was to return plats to the federal government for marketing and sale.

Hutchins had originally been instructed to make a return of the survey plat to Congress after each of the seven ranges had been completed, at which time the Secretary of War was to choose by lot one seventh of the land to compensate veterans of the Continental army. The rest of the lots were to be sold at auction in New York, then the nation's capital. A section (one square mile or 640 acres) was to be the smallest unit for sale, and some townships were to be sold in their entirety. The minimum price was one dollar per acre to be paid in cash or in land warrants of equivalent value. No land would be sold on credit.

The 1785 act called for one surveyor to be appointed by Congress from each state:

- New Hampshire - initially Nathaniel Adams, who resigned, and was replaced by Winthrop Sargent;
- Massachusetts - initially Rufus Putnam, who was surveying the lands of Maine and unavailable, and was replaced by Benjamin Tupper;
- Rhode Island - initially Caleb Harris, who resigned, and was replaced by Ebenezer Sproat;
- New York - William Morris;
- Pennsylvania - Adam Hoopes;
- Maryland - James Simpson;
- Virginia - Alex Parker;
- North Carolina - Absalom Tatom;
- South Carolina - William Tate;
- Connecticut - Isaac Sherman.

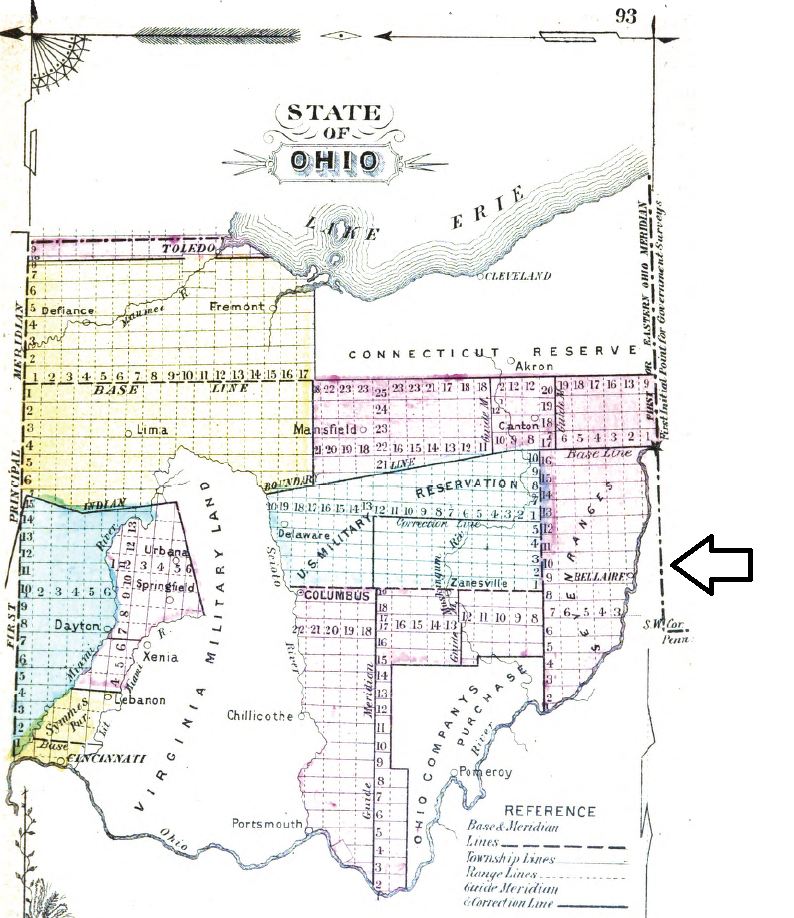
Arrow points to The Seven Ranges

==== Process ====
After passage of the act, on May 27, 1785, Hutchins was appropriated funds and made arrangements. A survey party reached the Ohio River on August 20, 1785, and the point of beginning of the east-west boundary that would delineate the Seven Ranges was marked. Hutchins arrived in Pittsburgh on September 3 to join his field party, and wrote a letter to the President of the Continental Congress noting that the requirement of the act for equal square townships could not be strictly met on a nearly spherical planet. Hutchins began the survey of the Geographer's Line on September 30. On October 8, word was received of an Indian attack on the Tuscarawas River. He and his men were scared, and returned to Pittsburgh after only a four miles of the Geographers Line had been completed. Hutchins returned to New York that autumn. On May 9, 1786, Congress instructed him to continue his survey only south of the Geographers line, because the position of the 41st line of latitude, the northern boundary of the Congress Lands, north of which is the Connecticut Western Reserve, was unsettled.

Hutchins arrived in Pittsburgh again on July 25, 1786. He and his men resumed their survey on August 5, and by September, 1786, they placed a stone completing the Geographer's Line at a place near Magnolia called the Seven Ranges Terminus 40°39′07″N 81°19′05″W. Under protection from Indians by troops housed at the newly constructed Fort Steuben, the group completed four ranges, and forty two miles of the west side of the fifth range that autumn. The first and second ranges had been surveyed into townships by Captain Martin, and the third and fourth ranges by General Tupper, Colonel Sproat, Colonel Sherman, and Mr. Simpson. Hutchins submitted a plat of the first four ranges to Congress in the spring of 1787. In June 1787, Hutchins presented the completed seven ranges to Congress, and asked for a leave of absence, which was granted. Surveyors of the previous year continued detailing the survey. Israel Ludlow completed the seventh range, with the southwest corner 39°20′33″N 81°21′52″W a few miles up the Ohio river from Marietta, Ohio, followed by James Simpson in the sixth range and Absalom Martin in the fifth. Those three returned to New York, where, with Hutchins, they completed their more detailed report. Hutchins submitted the general plan, concluding notes, and plats to the board of treasury on July 26, 1788. In 1788, Hutchins began surveying additional lands on September 2, but fell ill and returned to Pittsburgh, where he died April 28, 1789, his grander survey incomplete.

Congress had wanted the survey completed and to begin land sales in 1786. Hutchins sent his survey completion report to Congress, in June 1787, "and the work was not only late, but shoddy. The Geographer's Line did not run due west but drooped about two degrees to the south. Few of the east-west lines crossed the north-south ones at right angles. [creating] a grid of irregular quadrilaterals." However, on July 13, 1787, an "Ordinance for the government of the Territory of the United States northwest of the Ohio River" was passed by Congress, and by September 1787, the lands surveyed in the Seven Ranges were at last put on sale in New York City.

The original survey set stones at one mile (1.6 km) intervals along the four sides of each township, and did not venture to the interior. The individual sections were not completely surveyed until 1806.

==== Numbering ====
The sections of each survey township are numbered according to the plan of the Land Ordinance of 1785. The Ranges are numbered starting from Ellicott's Line working westward. Townships are numbered starting from the southernmost township or partial township in each range, and numbering northward toward the Geographers line, a system called the Ohio River Base. Thus, townships next to one another do not have the same number due to the irregularity of the Ohio River's course, with the townships adjacent to the Geographer's Line numbered 5, 9, 12, 13, 14, 15, and 16 in ranges 1 to 7. This deficiency was corrected outside of Ohio by numbering from a baseline.

== Land sales ==
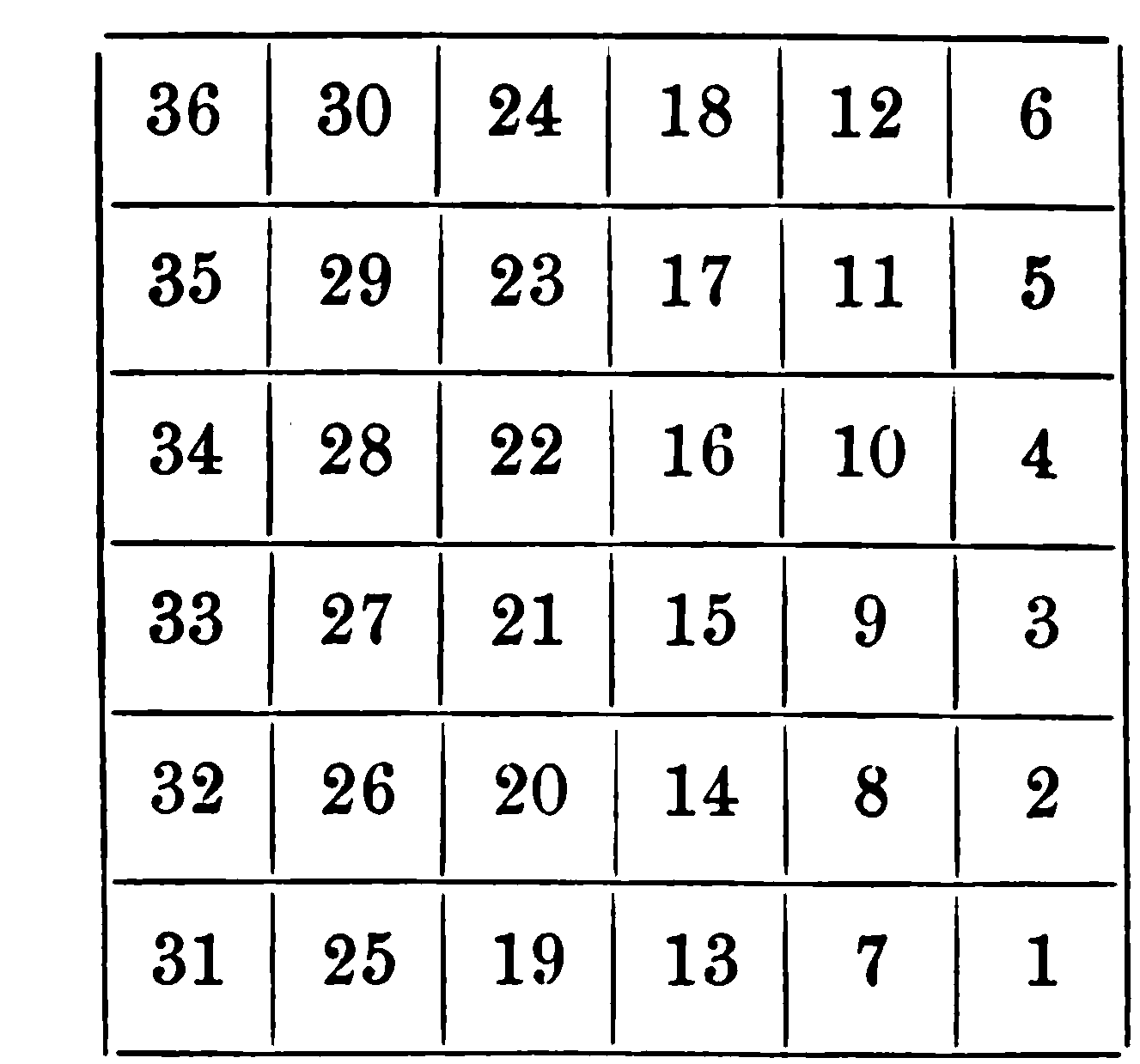
Plan for numbering sections of a township adopted May 20, 1785

A land patent for a 39.44-acre (15.96 ha) land tract in present-day Monroe County, sold by the Marietta Land Office in 1834.

Public sales began in 1787 in New York, and were continued in Philadelphia, Pittsburgh, and Steubenville, Ohio. Difficulties with Indians continued in the area until the Treaty of Greenville in 1795, and settlement was slow. Steubenville was founded in 1797, and the Federal Land Office there opened in 1801. The Steubenville Land Office was responsible for sales in the northern part of the tract, within 48 miles (77 km) of the Geographer's Line. The Marietta Land Office sold lands in the southern part. The United States General Land Office in the nation's capital also sold land. Local offices were eventually closed. The area was settled mostly by Pennsylvanians and Virginians. Section 16 of each survey township was set aside for public education as School Lands. Knepper notes: "Sections number 8, 11, 26, and 29 in every township were reserved for future sale by the federal government when, it was hoped, they would bring higher prices because of developed land around them. Congress also reserved one third part of all gold, silver, lead, and copper mines to its own use, a bit of wishful thinking as regards Ohio lands."

== Dohrman Tract ==
Arnold Henry Dohrman helped the American cause in the revolutionary war at great expense while living in Portugal. Unable to fully compensate him monetarily, Congress granted him township 13 of range 7 in what became known as the Dohrman Tract or Dohrman's Grant, now a part of Harrison and Tuscarawas Counties.

== Ephraim Kimberly Grant ==
The Ephraim Kimberly Grant was a 300-acre (1.2 km^{2}) land tract in township 4 of range 2 of the Seven Ranges that was granted to an American Revolutionary War veteran by Congress late in the 18th century.

== Legacy ==
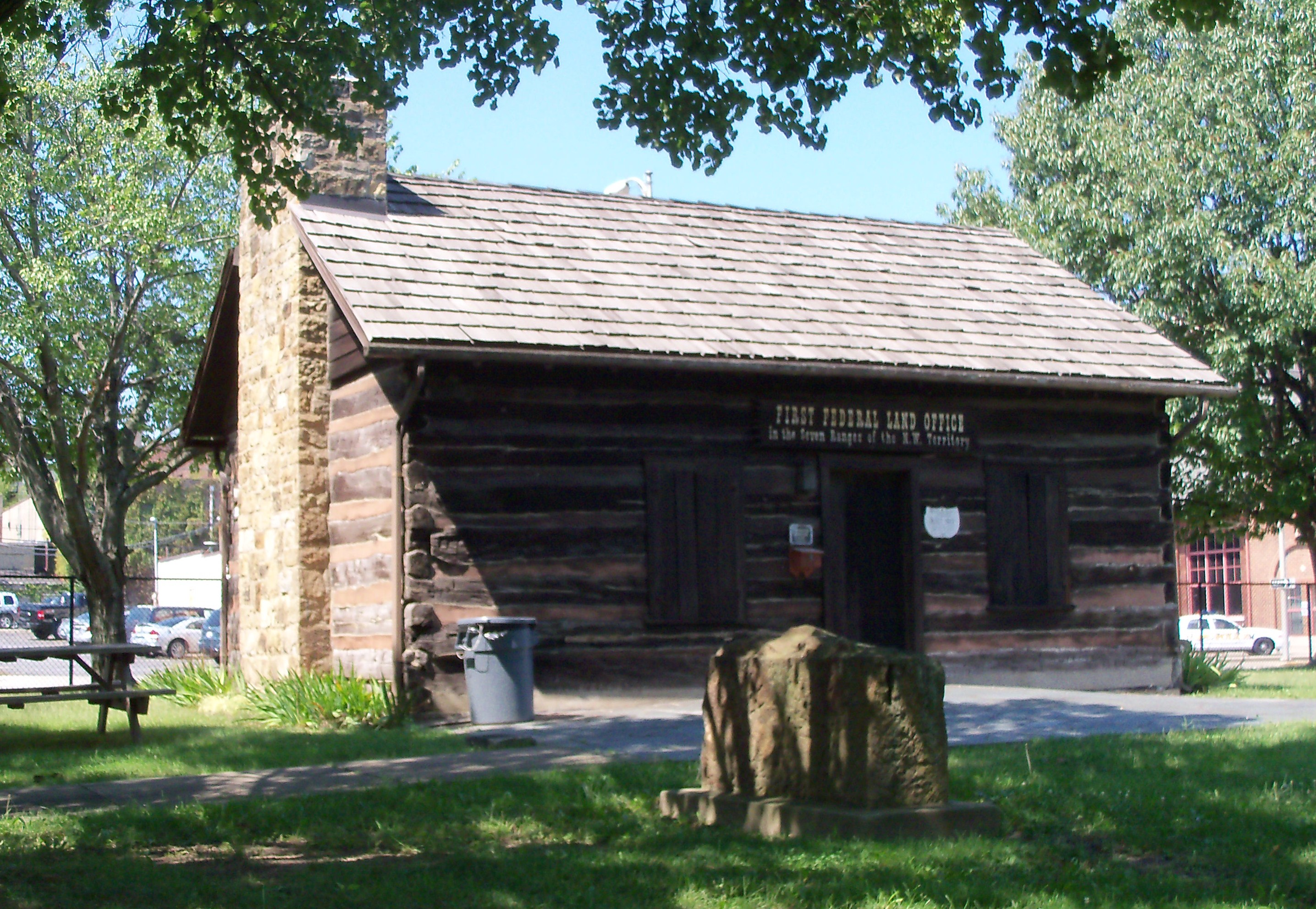
Steubenville Land Office

The plan to return plats to Congress after each seven ranges was abandoned after the first seven. The 1785 section numbering plan was subsequently used for the privately surveyed Symmes Purchase and, with some modifications, by the privately surveyed Ohio Company of Associates. A different system was established for later surveys.
The system of numbering townships north from the Ohio River Base, and ranges west from Pennsylvania was used for the Ohio Company of Associates, Congress Lands North of Old Seven Ranges and Congress Lands East of Scioto River.
A point on the west boundary of the Seven Ranges fifty miles south of the Geographer's Line is the meridian for the United States Military District.

== See also ==
- Ohio Lands
- Historic regions of the United States
