= Ephraim Kimberly Grant =

Coordinates: 40°11′12″N 80°41′36″W

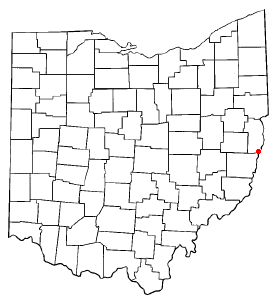
Location of Kimberley Grant in Ohio

The Ephraim Kimberly Grant was a land tract in eastern Ohio that was granted to an American Revolutionary War veteran by Congress late in the 18th century. It was located in the Seven Ranges along the Ohio River.

== Background ==
The Congress had little money to pay the soldiers who fought for independence. They made promises of land to induce army enlistment. By resolutions of September 16 and 18, 1776, and August 12, September 22, and October 3, 1780, they proposed to give each officer or private continuously to serve in the United States army until the close of the war, or until discharged, or to the representatives of those slain by the enemy, tract sizes dependent on rank.

Capt. Ephraim Kimberly, (October 22, 1738, September 8, 1795) (Company of the 2nd Connecticut) is recognized as a patriot by the Daughters of the American Revolution Society. After the war, Kimberly squatted at the mouth of Indian Short Creek, now Short Creek, along the Ohio River. On April 8, 1794, Congress granted Kimberly 300 acres (1.2 km^{2}) in an act entitled “AN ACT to authorize Ephraim Kimberly to locate the land warrant issued to him for services in the late American Army”

The Tract was surveyed by Absalom Martin, and was the first deed recorded in Jefferson County, Ohio, located in Warren Township. The tract was in Township 4 of range 2 of the Old Seven Ranges. In modern times, Rayland, Ohio lies at the mouth of Short Creek.

== See also ==
- Ohio Lands
- Historic regions of the United States
