= Canal Lands =

Canal Lands were tracts of land donated by the federal government to several Great Lakes states in the 19th century to encourage internal improvements and aid in funding the construction of Canals. These states sold the land tracts to private parties to raise funds for canal construction.

Checkerboarding was used as a compromise method between opponents and proponents of such federal subsidies, and this subsidy system continued with land grants to railroads between 1851 and 1870.

== Previous grants ==
The federal government initiated donations to the states for internal improvements with the Ohio Enabling act in 1802. This act set aside 5 percent of the proceeds of the sale of federal land within the state to fund roads connecting the state to the east coast, and for roads within the state. This act was later amended to award two percent to build roads connecting Ohio to the East, and three percent for roads within the state. This established a precedent extended to other states, which received two, three or five percent of sale proceeds.

== Canal era ==
The era of canal building in the west began after the success of the Erie Canal in New York. States wanted to build canals to connect the Great Lakes with the Mississippi River basin. The first federal action to support such canals was for Indiana, to allow a canal between the Wabash River and Lake Erie, in 1824. This act was not utilized. The act of March 2, 1827 granted land equal to two and one half sections on each side of the canal to Indiana, that they could resell to support canal construction, with deadlines for completion of the canal, and free passage on the canal for the federal government. Part of this canal passed through Ohio, so the act of June 30, 1834 corrected the unpleasantness on Indiana being granted land in Ohio, and instead granted the land to Ohio. Grants of two and one half sections either side of canals were extended to other states for their projects, as in the table, along with some grants not based on that calculation.

State	Year	Date	Statue	Canal name	Grant area
Indiana	1824	May 26	4 Stat. 47	Wabash and Erie	---
Indiana	1827	March 2	4 Stat. 236	Wabash and Erie	234,236.73 acres (948 km^{2})
Indiana	1830	May 29	4 Stat. 416	Wabash and Erie	29,552.50 acres (120 km^{2})
Indiana	1841	February 27	5 Stat. 414	Wabash and Erie	259,368.48 acres (1,050 km^{2})
Indiana	1842	August 29	5 Stat. 542	Wabash and Erie	24,219.83 acres (98 km^{2})
Indiana	1845	March 3	5 Stat. 731	Wabash and Erie	796,630.19 acres (3,224 km^{2})
Indiana	1848	May 9	9 Stat. 219	Wabash and Erie	113,348.33 acres (459 km^{2})
Ohio	1827; 1834	March 2 June 30	4 Stat. 236; 4 Stat. 716	Wabash and Erie	266,535.00 acres (1,079 km^{2})
Ohio	1828; 1830	May 24; April 2	4 Stat. 305; 4 Stat. 393	Miami and Dayton	333,826.00 acres (1,351 km^{2})
Ohio	1828	May 24	4 Stat. 306 (section 5)	General canal purposes	500,000.00 acres (2,023 km^{2})
Illinois	1827; 1854	March 2 August 3	4 Stat. 234; 10 Stat. 344	Illinois river and Lake Michigan	290,915.00 acres (1,177 km^{2})
Wisconsin	1838	June 18	5 Stat. 245	Milwaukee and Rock River	125,431.00 acres (508 km^{2})
Wisconsin	1866; 1872; 1874	April 10; March 1 March 7	14 Stat. 30; 17 Stat. 32; 18 Stat. 20	Breakwater and Harbor Ship	200,000.00 acres (809 km^{2})
Michigan	1852	August 26	10 Stat. 35	St. Mary’s Ship	750,000.00 acres (3,035 km^{2})
Michigan	1865	March 3	13 Stat. 519	Portage Lake and Lake Superior Ship	200,000.00 acres (809 km^{2})
Michigan	1866	July 3	14 Stat. 81	Portage Lake and Lake Superior Ship	200,000.00 acres (809 km^{2})
Michigan	1866	July 3	14 Stat. 80	lac la belle ship	100,000.00 acres (405 km^{2})

State	Total grant
Indiana	1,457,366.06 acres (5,898 km^{2})
Ohio	1,100,361.00 acres (4,453 km^{2})
Illinois	290,915.00 acres (1,177 km^{2})
Wisconsin	325,431.00 acres (1,317 km^{2})
Michigan	1,250,000.00 acres (5,059 km^{2})
Total	4,424,073.06 acres (17,904 km^{2})

== Ohio Canal Lands ==
Ohio had constructed a canal to connect the Ohio River to Dayton. The act of 1828 was to support extension to the Maumee River in the north, where it would connect to the Wabash and Erie Canal and Lake Erie. The 500,000-acre (2,000 km^{2}) grant was applied to construction of the Ohio and Erie Canal in the eastern half of the state. Ohio earned $2,257,487 from sale of their lands located in the northwest of the state.

== Other grants for improvements ==
The United States granted more than one million acres (4,000 km²) for military wagon roads in the nineteenth century. Large amounts of land were donated to build railroads. Section eight of the act of September 4, 1841, called the State Selection act, 5 Stat. 455, granted 500,000 acres (2,000 km^{2}) per state for internal improvements.
