= Beginning Point of the U.S. Public Land Survey =

Site in Ohio and Pennsylvania, US

- U.S. National Register of Historic Places
- U.S. National Historic Landmark
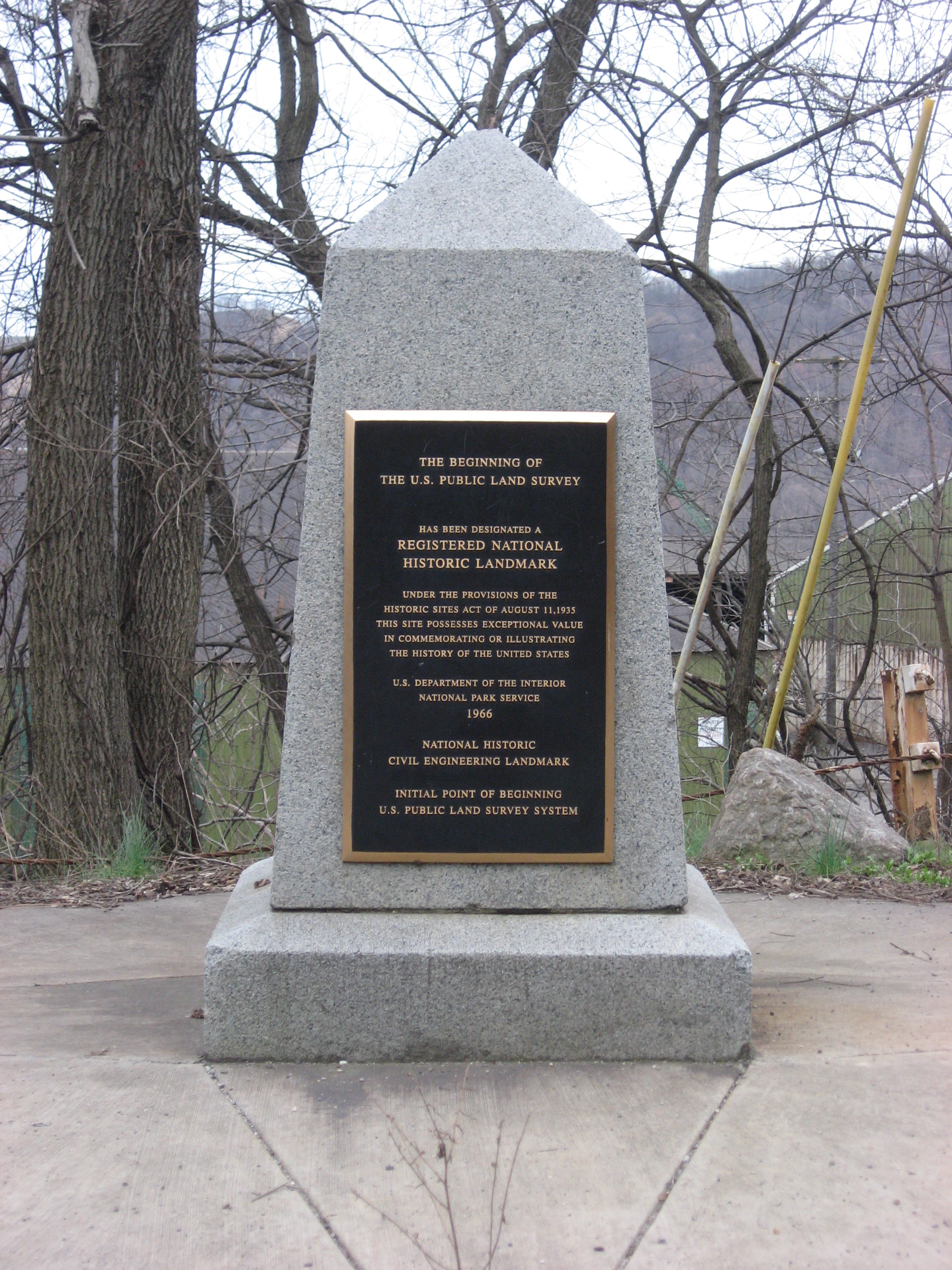
- Front of the monument

- Location within Ohio Location within the United States
- Location: East Liverpool, Ohio
- Coordinates: 40°38′33″N 80°31′8.5″W
- Area: less than one acre
- Built: 1786
- NRHP reference No.: 66000606

Significant dates
- Added to NRHP: October 15, 1966
- Designated NHL: June 23, 1965

The Beginning Point of the U.S. Public Land Survey is the point from which the United States in 1786 began the formal survey of the lands known then as the Northwest Territory, now making up all of Ohio, Indiana, Illinois, Michigan, Wisconsin, and part of Minnesota. The survey is claimed to be the first major cadastral survey undertaken by any nation. The point now lies underwater on the state line between Ohio and Pennsylvania. Because it is submerged, a monument commemorating the point is adjacent to the nearest roadway and located on the state line between East Liverpool, Ohio and Ohioville, Pennsylvania. The area around the marker was designated a National Historic Landmark in 1965.

== Description and history ==
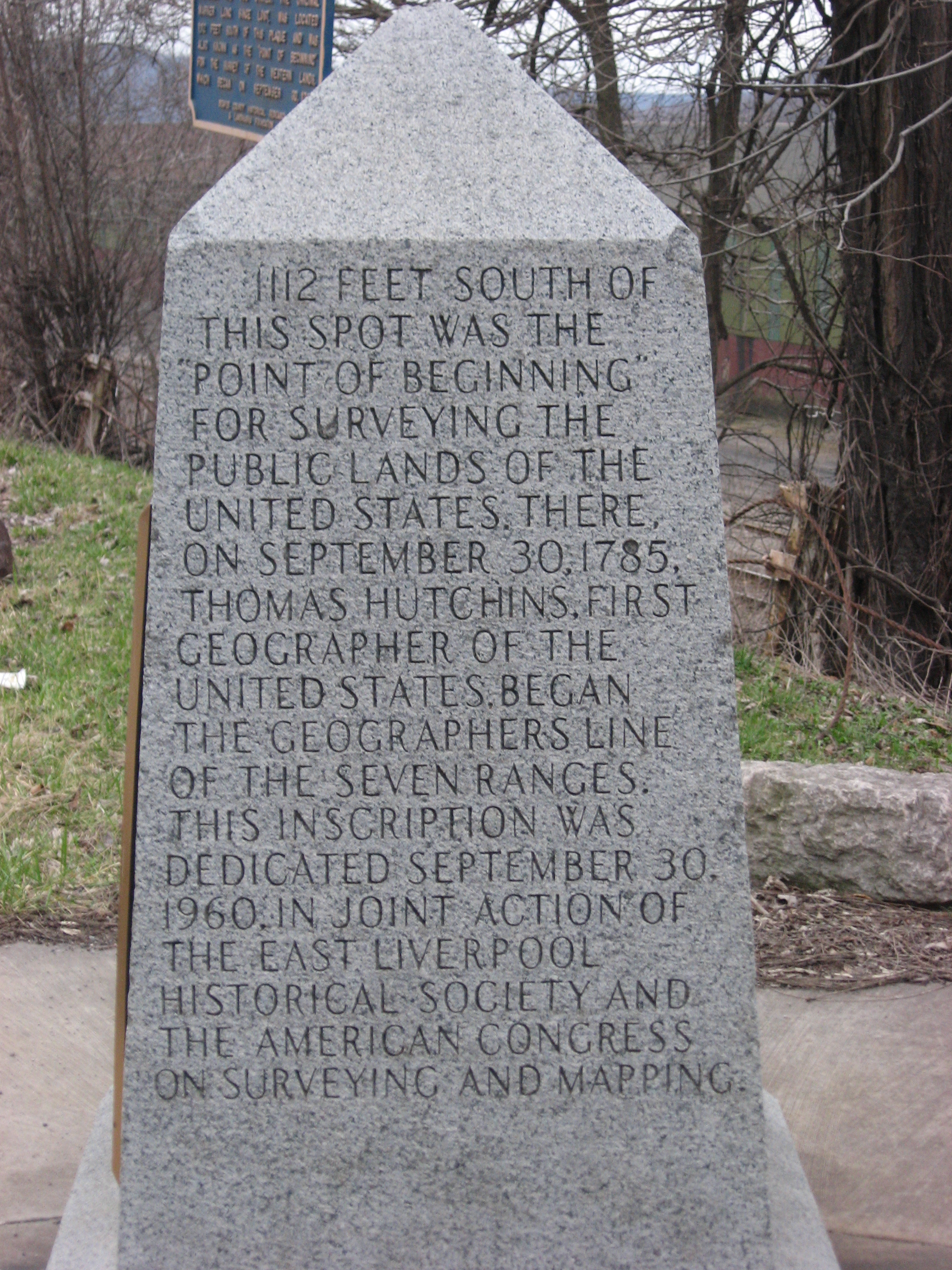
Side of the monument

The monument commemorating the survey point is located on the north side of the Ohio River, on the south side of the road designated Ohio State Route 39 to the west and Pennsylvania Route 68 to the east. It is near the three-way intersection of Ohio, Pennsylvania, and the northern tip of West Virginia, in both the Pittsburgh metropolitan area and the Salem micropolitan area. It is inscribed "1,112 feet south of this spot was the point of beginning for surveying the Public Lands of the United States."

The Public Land Survey System of the United States was established by Congressional legislation in 1785, in order to provide an orderly mechanism for opening the Northwest Territory for settlement. The ordinance directed the Geographer of the United States, Thomas Hutchins, to survey an initial east-west base line. Hutchins began in 1786, using as his starting point a stake on north bank of the Ohio River placed by a 1785 survey team from the states of Virginia and Pennsylvania to fix their common north-south boundary (now the boundary between Pennsylvania and the northern tip of West Virginia). Hutchins' work, completed in 1787, established the Seven Ranges, with a baseline extending about 42 miles (68 km) westwards of the north-south line. This survey is believed to be "the first mathematically designed system and nationally conducted cadastral survey in any modern country."

The monument was placed in 1881, and is maintained by the East Liverpool Historical Society. It was declared a National Historic Landmark in 1965 and designated as a National Historic Civil Engineering Landmark in 1985.

== See also ==
- Beginning Point of the Louisiana Purchase Survey
- Ohio River Trail
- List of National Historic Landmarks in Pennsylvania
- List of National Historic Landmarks in Ohio
- National Register of Historic Places listings in Beaver County, Pennsylvania
- National Register of Historic Places listings in Columbiana County, Ohio
